= Holden Commodore (VE) =

Australian full-size car

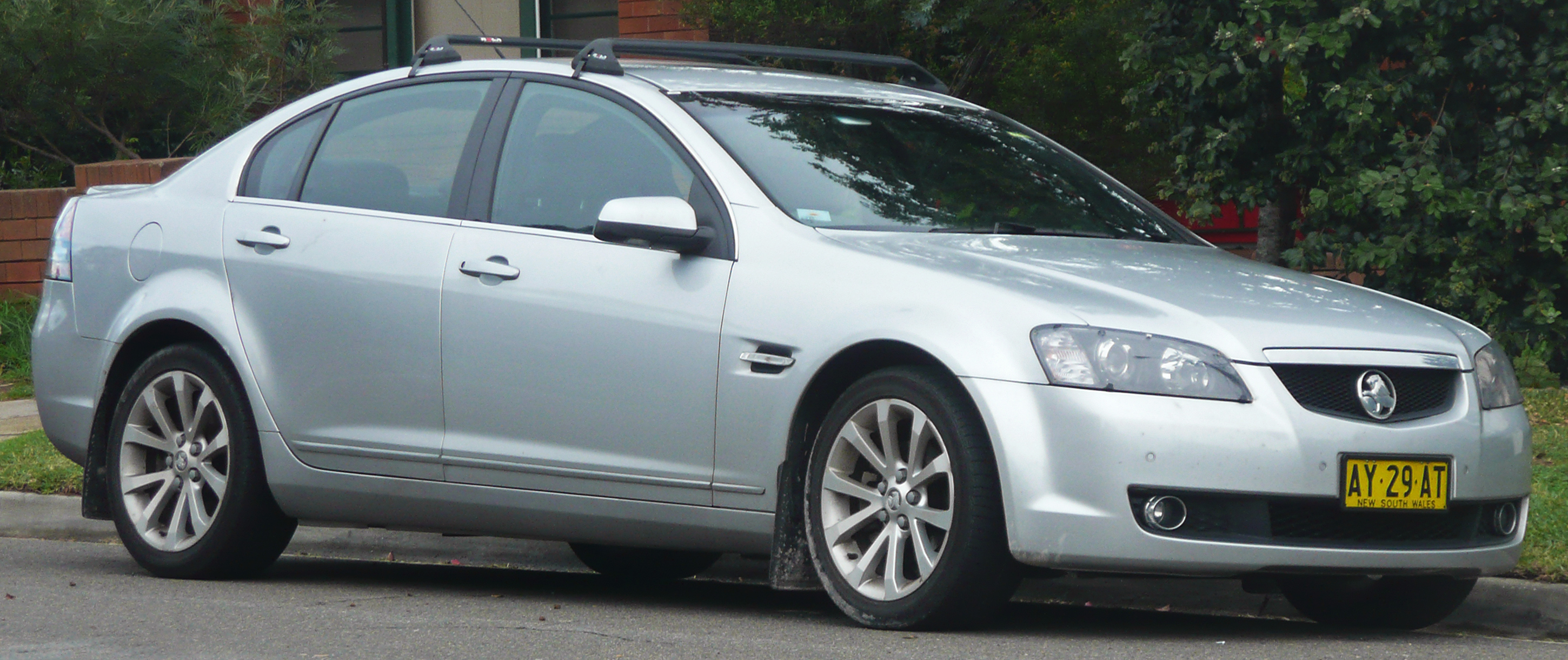

Overview
- Manufacturer: Holden
- Also called: Holden Berlina; Holden Calais; Holden Ute; HSV E Series; Chevrolet Lumina (Middle East and South Africa); Chevrolet Omega (Brazil); Pontiac G8 (North America); Vauxhall VXR8 (UK); CSV CR8 (Middle East)
- Production: July 2006 – May 2013 (sedan); August 2007 – May 2013 (utility); July 2008 – May 2013 (wagon)
- Assembly: Australia: Adelaide, South Australia (Elizabeth)
- Designer: Peter Hughes (2003)

Body and chassis
- Class: Full-size
- Body style: 2-door coupé utility; 4-door sedan; 5-door station wagon
- Layout: Front-engine, rear-wheel drive
- Platform: GM Zeta
- Related: Buick Park Avenue (China); Chevrolet Camaro (fifth generation); Holden Statesman/Caprice (WM); Holden Special Vehicles GTS/Clubsport

Powertrain
- Engine: 3.0 L LF1 V6 (2006–2010); 3.0 L LFW V6 (2010–2013); 3.6 L LY7 V6; 3.6 L LFX V6; 6.0 L L98 V8 (Manual 2008–2010); 6.0 L L76 V8 (Auto 2008–2010); 6.0 L L77 V8; 6.2 L LS3 V8 (HSV and Pontiac); 7.0 L LS7 V8 (HSV only)
- Transmission: 4-speed GM 4L60-E automatic; 5-speed GM 5L40-E automatic; 6-speed GM 6L50 automatic; 6-speed GM 6L80-E automatic; 6-speed Aisin AY6 manual; 6-speed Tremec T56 manual

Dimensions
- Wheelbase: 2,915 mm (114.8 in) (sedan, wagon); 3,009 mm (118.5 in) (utility)
- Length: 4,894–4,900 mm (192.7–192.9 in) (sedan); 4,896–4,904 mm (192.8–193.1 in) (wagon); 5,040–5,055 mm (198.4–199.0 in) (utility)
- Width: 1,899 mm (74.8 in)
- Height: 1,471–1,497 mm (57.9–58.9 in)
- Kerb weight: 1,690–1,825 kg (3,726–4,023 lb) (sedan); 1,837–1,988 kg (4,050–4,383 lb) (wagon); 1,620–1,777 kg (3,571–3,918 lb) (utility)

Chronology
- Predecessor: Holden Commodore (VZ)
- Successor: Holden Commodore (VF)

The Holden Commodore (VE) is a full-size car that was produced from 2006 to 2013 by Holden, the former Australian subsidiary of General Motors. Dubbed Holden's "billion dollar baby", the car was available as the Holden Berlina—the mid-range model—and the Holden Calais, the luxury variant; utility body styles were marketed as the Holden Ute.

Succeeding the VZ series, the VE was the first iteration of the fourth generation of the Holden Commodore, a series of automobiles built between 1978 and 2020. Unlike its predecessors, which used Opel-sourced platforms adapted to mechanics and sizes that would suit the local market, the VE was the first Commodore entirely designed and developed by Holden in Australia. To minimise export redevelopment costs, features such as a symmetrical centre console housing a flush-fitting hand brake lever facilitated the conversion to left-hand drive. The VE was internationally badge-engineered as the Chevrolet Lumina, Chevrolet Omega, Bitter Vero Sport and Pontiac G8.

Holden introduced the VE body styles in stages, beginning with the sedan in July 2006. Before this, the company stated they would manufacture two parallel generations of Commodores until the launch of the station wagon and utility. Variants by Holden's performance vehicle partner, Holden Special Vehicles, were released soon after the sedan's debut alongside the long-wheelbase WM Statesman/Caprice models. The VE Ute entered production in 2007, coinciding with the unveiling of the Sportwagon concept car. The production version of the VE Sportwagon—which shared its 2,915 mm (114.8 in) wheelbase with the sedan instead of the extended wheelbase from the Caprice, like previous models—was introduced in July 2008.

Named the 2006 Car of the Year by Wheels, the VE frequently ranked as the annual best-selling automobile in Australia over its production run. Holden introduced updates to the VE as model year (MY) changes. Typically subtle, these recurring changes involved alterations to colours and trim, increased standard equipment and reduced fuel consumption. More noteworthy adjustments have come in the form of a smaller 3.0-litre V6 engine for entry-level versions and "Series II" styling revisions in September 2010.

== Development ==
Official manufacture of the VE sedan began at Holden's production facility in Elizabeth, South Australia, on 13 July 2006. Three days later, Holden debuted the car at the Melbourne Convention Centre, an event that was broadcast simultaneously via the Internet. Its debut occurred alongside that of the company's flagship model, the Statesman/Caprice (WM). Before this, Holden announced that the VE station wagon and utility body styles would be delayed, while the VZ equivalents would continue to be produced. The VE Ute was revealed on 22 August 2007. This was followed by the unveiling of the Sportwagon concept late that year, the production version of which was released in July 2008.

=== Sedan ===
Across the seven years of development the VE became Holden's largest and most expensive project, representing an expenditure of approximately A$1.03 billion and 3.4 million kilometres (2.1 million miles) of testing. Following the investment, some critics referred to the VE by the sobriquet "billion dollar baby".

In late 1998, design chief Michael Simcoe sketched the initial concept for the VE—a rakish sedan with a long wheelbase and shorter overhangs—to guide management and designers. The sketch formed the design basis for the eventual production-ready car. In early 1999 Peter Hughes—manager of exterior design for Holden—produced a two-dimensional image of a sketch drawn earlier by Simcoe. By late 2000 eight initial exterior sketches were selected, then narrowed down to four through a voting process within the design team. These designs featured the same core elements: prominent wheel arches, an aggressive stance, dynamic lines and short overhangs. Full-size clay models of the four chosen sketches were created.

By July 2002, the speculative phase had ended, and a single exterior design direction was chosen. With only four years left before the car's launch, and without having undergone practical testing or real-world engineering, the team turned to a computer-aided industrial design program, Autodesk Alias. One solitary VE concept was refined, sculpted, taken to Holden's Lang Lang Proving Ground, placed on the skidpan, and scrutinised by designers and directors from up close and far away to assess how much prominence it had on the road.

In February 2003, the designers provided important information to the engineering team, and by May 2003 the design was finalised and approved by Peter Hughes. By July 2003, the teams created the final design mock-up, featuring a fully transparent model with a glasshouse structure. In 2004, two years before the release of the VE Commodore, Holden unveiled the Torana TT36 concept car at the Australian International Motor Show in Sydney. This concept previewed the production Commodore and allowed Holden to assess public response to the car's exterior design. Some production-ready components, such as the steering wheel and the handbrake lever, were adapted from the TT36 for the production VE.

After completing the initial design sketches, Holden's engineers quickly began work on developing the chassis. Opel discontinued the rear-wheel drive Omega in 2003. Holden, having used this platform for all earlier Commodore generations, had two options: adopt another General Motors (GM) platform or create a new architecture. GM's new premium rear-wheel drive Sigma platform, which was set to debut in the Cadillac CTS, was offered to Holden's engineers, who believed that it was unsuitable for the car's requirements. The shoulder width in the rear seat was too narrow. Holden chose to develop a new platform, the GM Zeta, which also served as the basis for several later GM vehicles. The car features a double-pivot MacPherson strut front suspension and a four-link independent rear suspension, which replaced the earlier MacPherson strut front, and semi-trailing arm rear, designs. Denny Mooney was appointed chairman of Holden in January 2004. One of Mooney's priorities was to improve the perceived quality issues that surrounded the previous generations of Commodores. Mooney advocated for a reduction of panel gaps by 0.5 millimetres (0.020 in) over previous targets. Using high-strength steel, the body structure is 50 per cent stiffer than the outgoing model. Strength enhancements include the incorporation of tailor-welded blanks in the front chassis rails and floor reinforcing, resulting in a bare shell mass of 70 kilograms (150 lb). These advancements not only result in noise, vibration and harshness reductions but also lead to improved handling and crash safety.

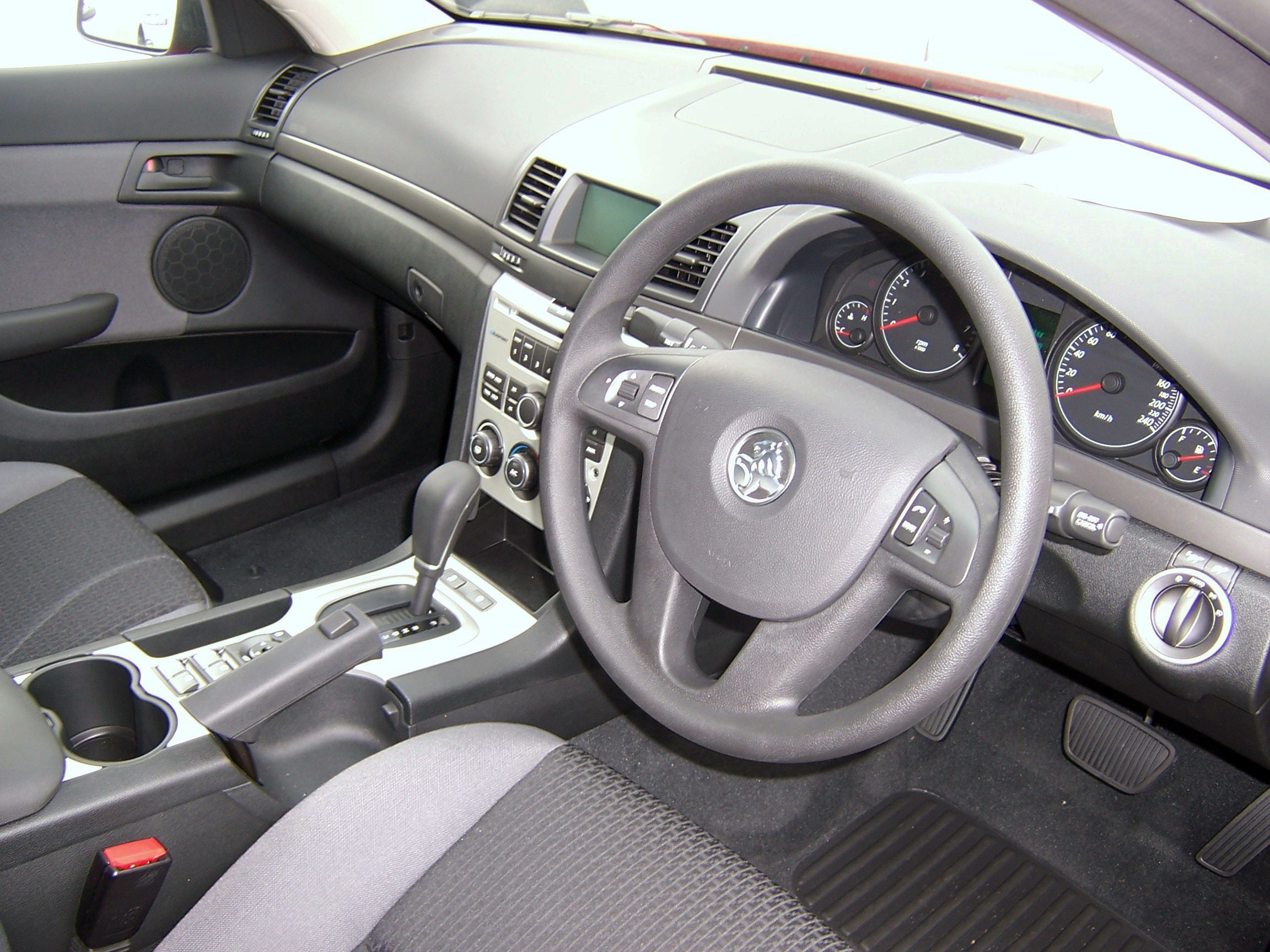
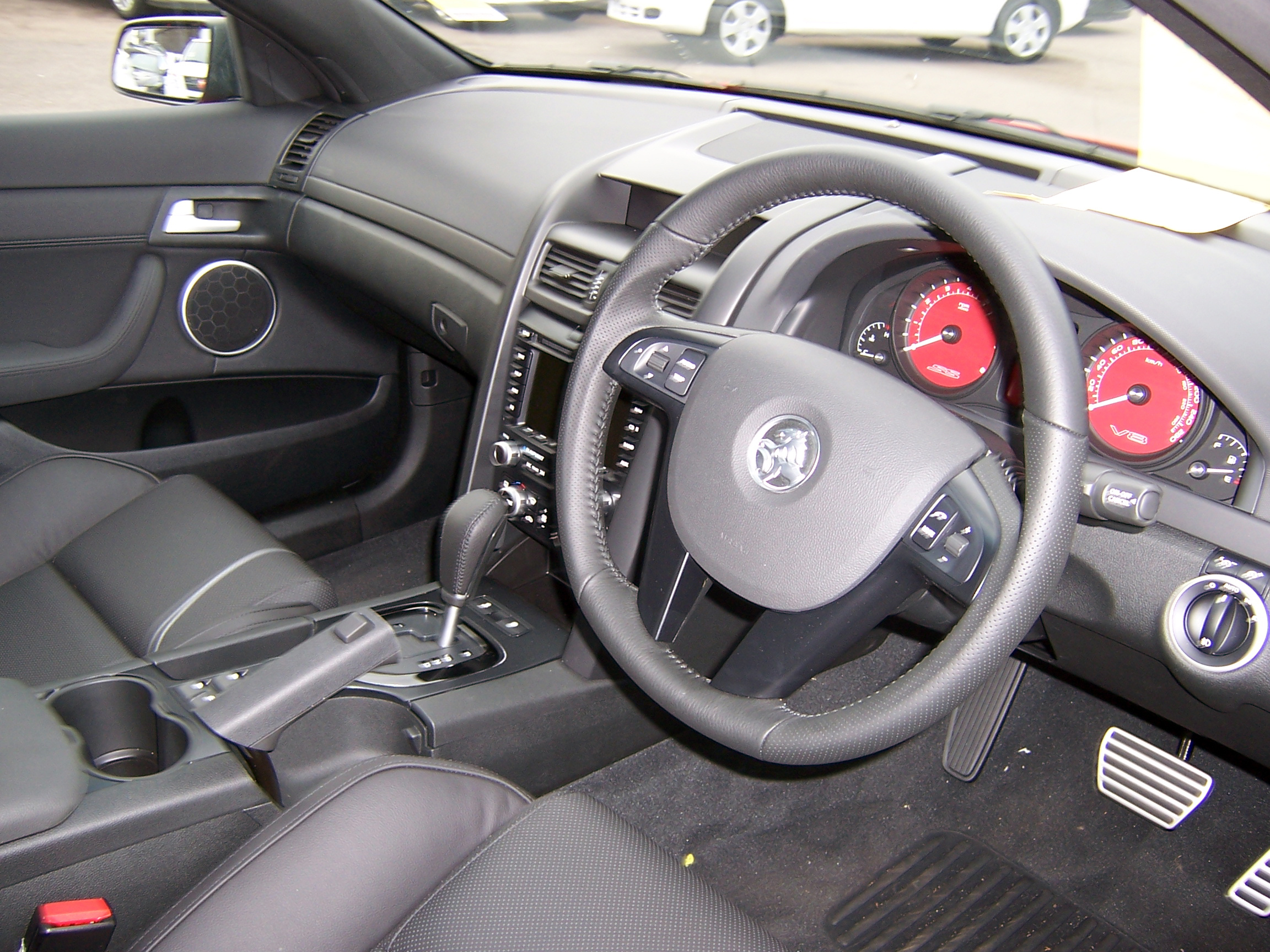
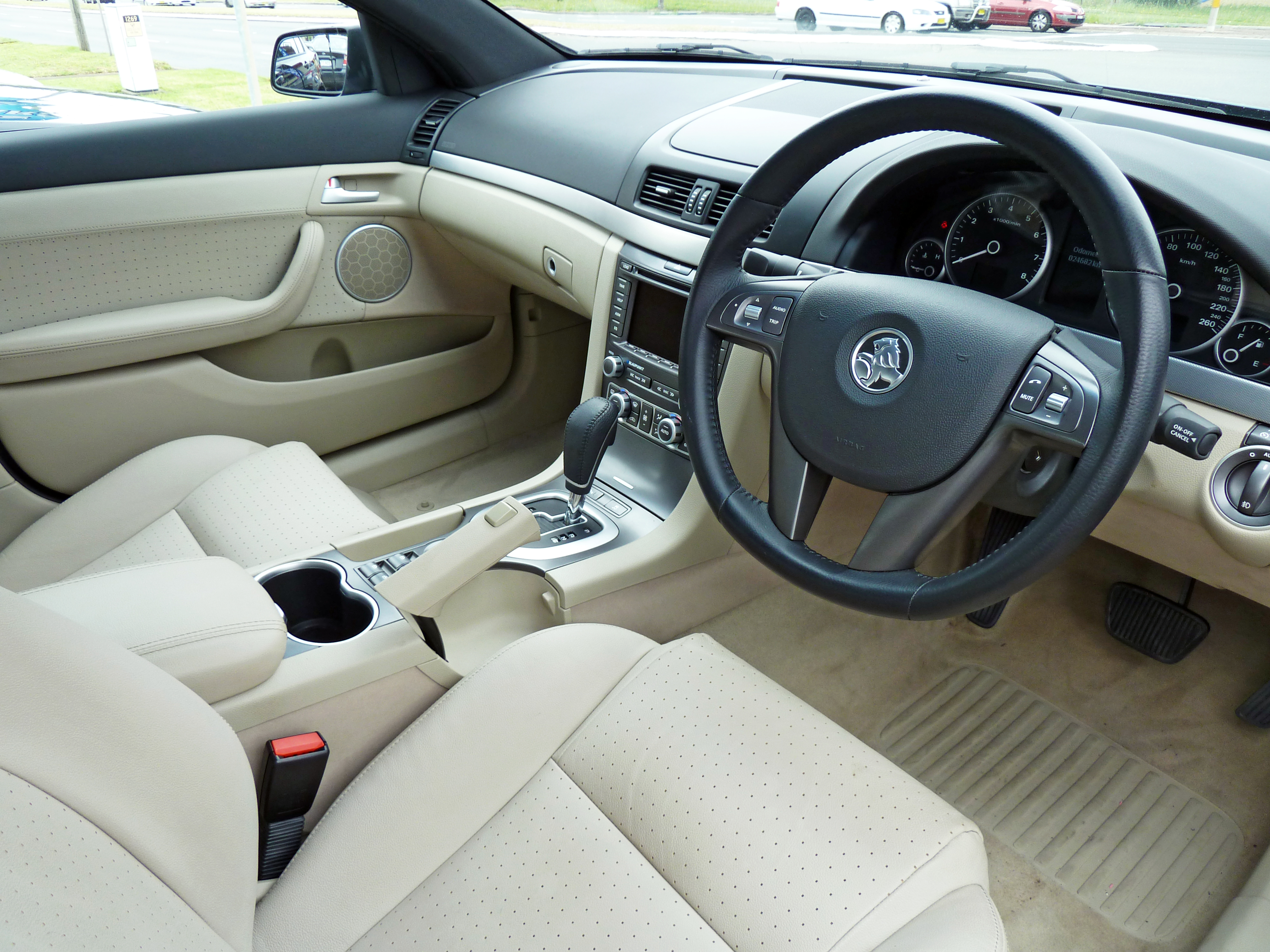
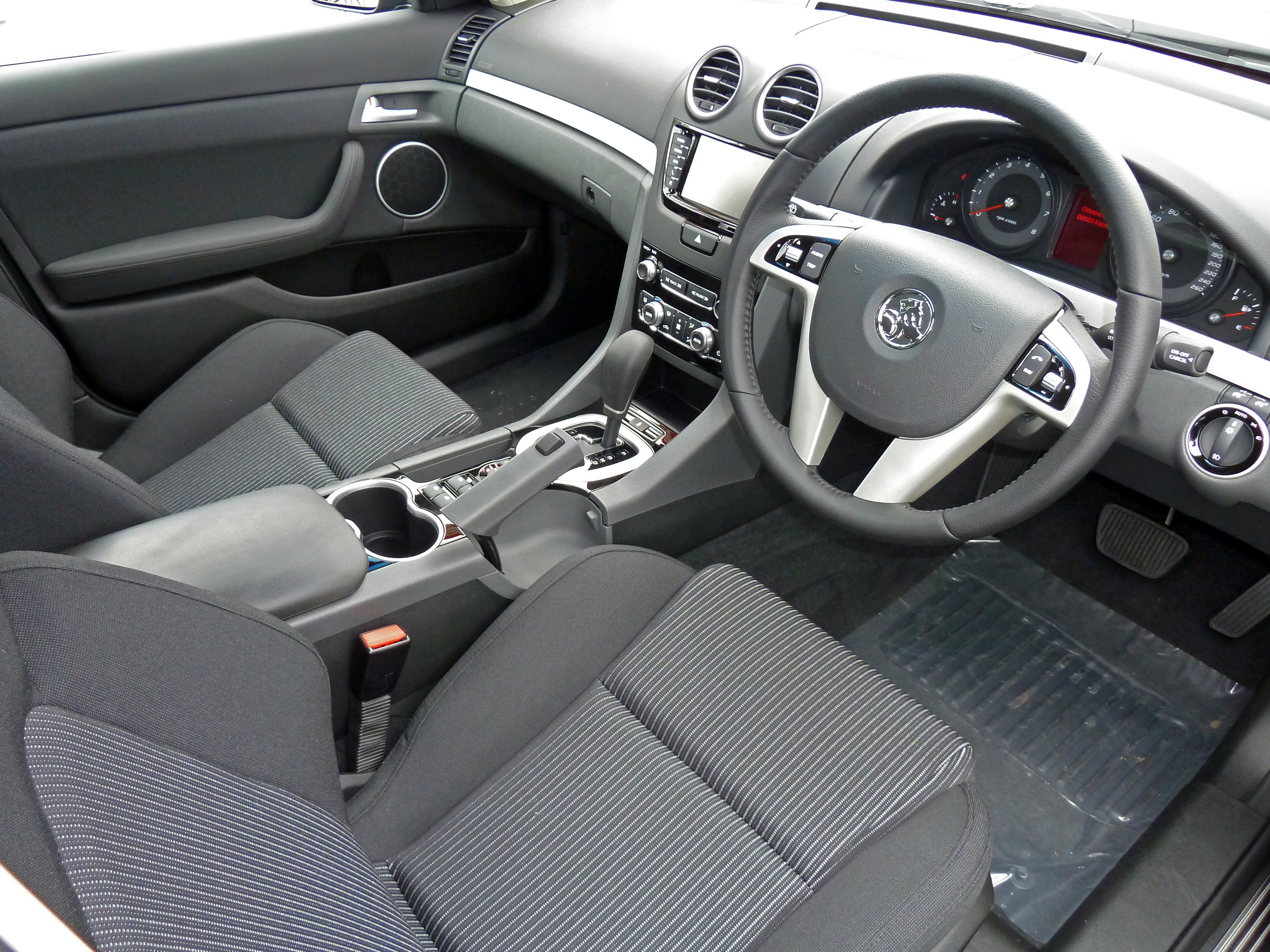
Interior types of the VE (top left to bottom right): Functional (Omega pictured); Performance (SS V pictured); Luxury (Calais V pictured); Series II Performance (SV6 pictured) (Note: Note that not every single interior type and version is pictured here.)

The development of the VE prompted Holden to redesign its facility in Elizabeth, South Australia, which would facilitate the assembly of entire sections of the car off the foremost production line. This allowed for a seamless construction of complete sub-assemblies, such as the engine and transmissions, to be assembled on rigs that simplify production. This is applied to the front-end module of the VE Commodore, which comprises accessory components such as headlights, bumpers and airbag sensors. The production method permits the easy removal of the entire front-end as a single-piece unit, resulting in reduced repair costs and easier access to the engine bay. The method was first used by GM and won the SAE Australasia's 2006 "Automotive Engineering Excellence Award". Holden implemented a modular design structure known as the "Flex" strategy for the VE's interior, where fundamentally different components, such as audio systems and instrument clusters, could easily be swapped between variants while keeping production costs manageable. This approach resulted in significantly greater differentiation between the variants compared to the previous model, offering three distinct interior styles: Functional, Performance and Luxury.

The VE model introduced several updates, including a new four-strut hinge system for the boot and replacing the previous "gooseneck" hinges. High-specification variants feature expandable door pockets and a "blackout" mode that illuminates only the speedometer at night. The handbrake is flush-fitting and integrated into a symmetrical centre console allowing the car to be easily re-configured for left-hand drive markets and thus reducing redesign and redevelopment costs.

=== Sportwagon ===
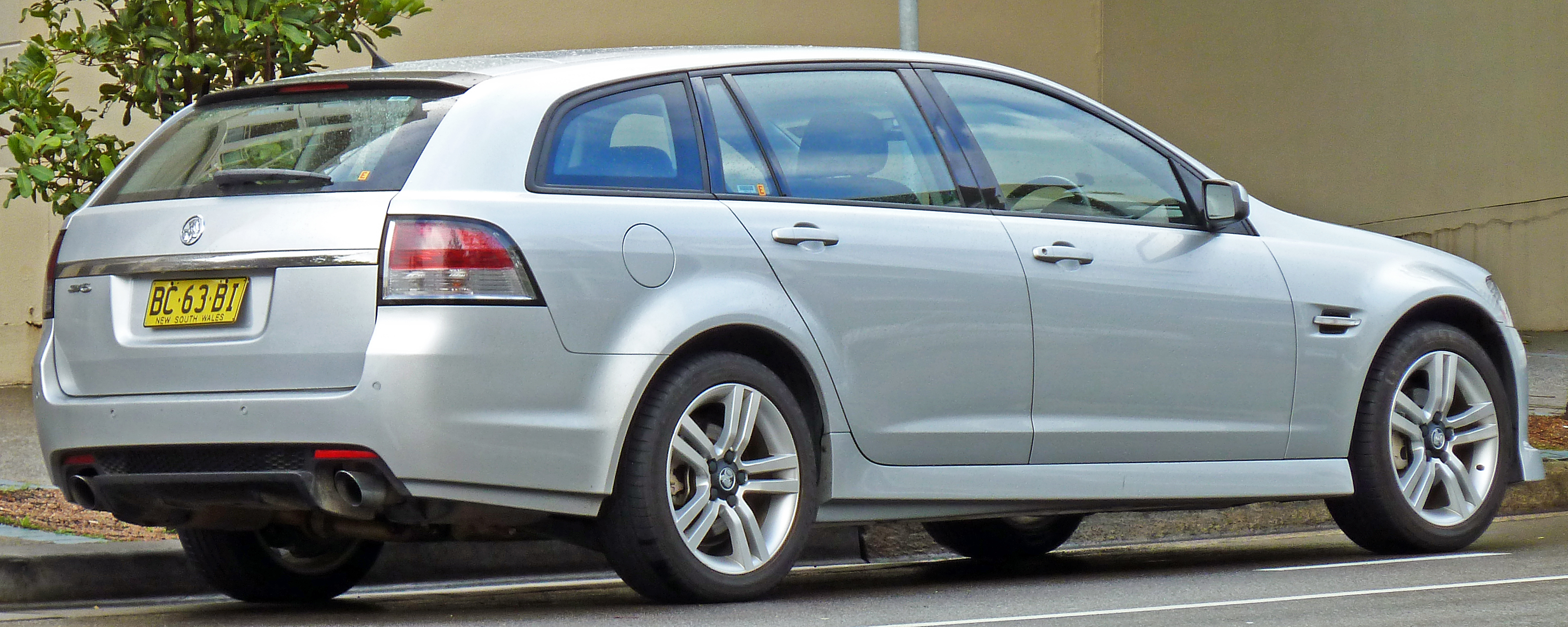
Unlike its predecessor, which used a longer wheelbase, the Sportwagon (pictured) shares the sedan's 2,915 mm (114.8 in) wheelbase.

Unveiled at the 2007 Australian International Motor Show in Melbourne, the Sportwagon marked a departure from previous Commodore station wagons. Representing an A$110 million investment and over 500,000 kilometres (310,000 mi) of road testing, the VE Sportwagon programme aimed to address the changing station wagon market, due to the growth of the sales of sport utility vehicles (SUVs) and the overreliance on fleet purchasing. Recognising a shift away from traditional station wagons, Holden sought to develop a sportier and more stylish station wagon, dubbed the Sportwagon. Up to 90 per cent of VZ wagons were bought by fleet companies, and Holden desired to attract more retail customers; they decided to develop a lower, sportier wagon as an alternative to SUVs.

The Sportwagon, unlike all previous models—which shared their long-wheelbase with the Statesman/Caprice—is built on the same 2,915 mm (114.8 in) wheelbase platform as the sedan. While this adjustment resulted in a cargo capacity reduction from the VZ's 1,402 to 895 litres (370 to 236 US gal), the sedan's near 50:50 weight distribution is retained. To ensure the cargo opening is large enough, the tailgate is hinged well up into the roofline. The design of the tailgate is compact enough to open in just 268 millimetres (10.6 in) of space, a feature publicised in Sportwagon television commercials. Modifications to the suspension were made to accommodate the Sportwagon's different design characteristics, including stiffer springs, alterations to the anti-roll bar, and an additional ball joint in the rear suspension to handle the increased weight. Compared to the sedan, kerb weight was increased by about 91 kilograms (201 lb).

=== Ute ===
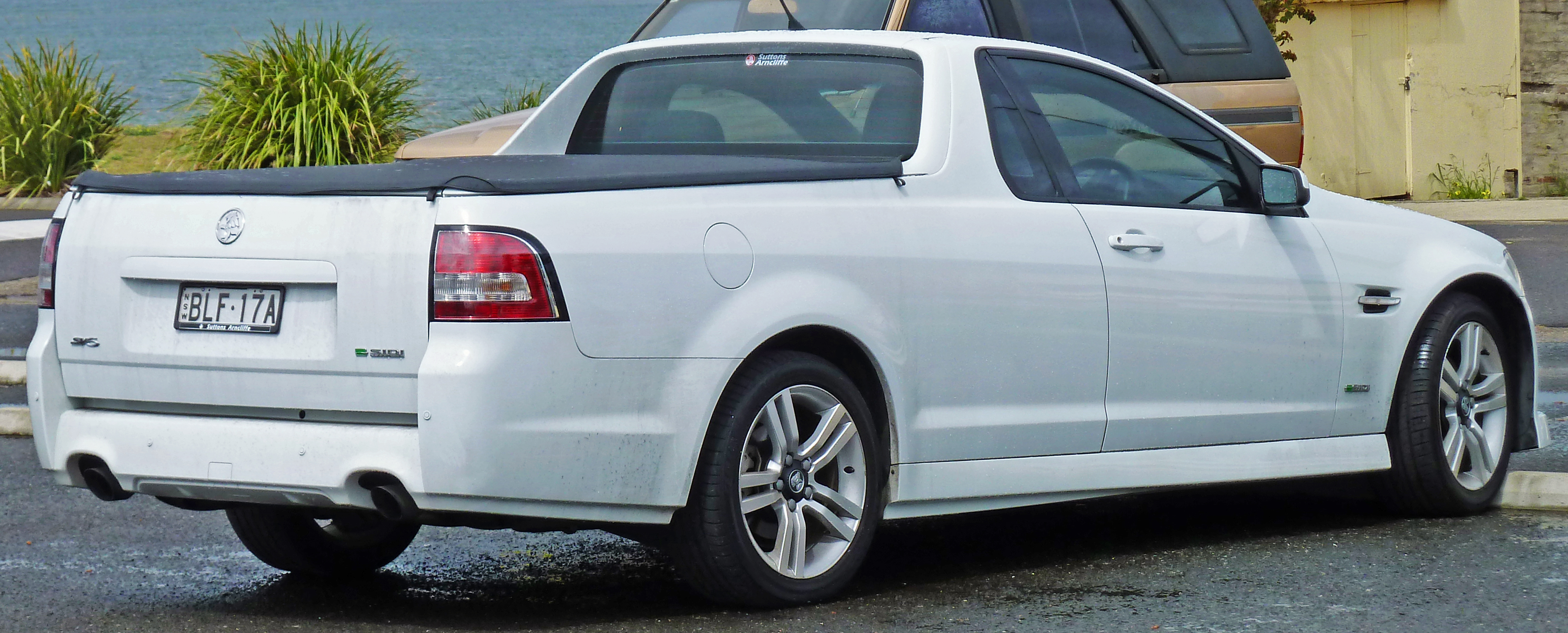
The Ute (pictured) is built upon the Caprice's 3,009 mm (118.5 in) wheelbase.

The Holden Ute—the coupe utility body style—was unveiled on 22 August 2007 via the Internet and was designed to be a "lifestyle vehicle", a shift from the traditional "workhorse" market. The VE Ute program received an investment of around A$105.1 million. The design was conceived in 2000, when the team began developing the design of the VE sedan and the global rear-wheel-drive architecture. At that time, many of the surfaces, details, and linework along the sides of the car were incorporated to ensure the flexibility needed to extend the design to accommodate a Ute. The Holden Ute shares its 3,009-millimetre (118.5 in) wheelbase with the WM Statesman/Caprice. The horizontal tail light was meant to give the Ute what Tony Stolfo—the chief designer of the VE—describes as "a more car-like persona", as did the raised numberplate housing and full one-piece bumper.

== Safety ==
Engine placement was a contentious issue during development. Holden's designers advocated for the engine to be positioned well behind the front axle, aiming to achieve short overhangs and an overall sportier appearance. However, this approach raised concerns among crash engineers, who feared it would reduce the body's impact absorption in the event of an accident. To resolve the conflicting perspectives, a consensus was reached between designers and crash engineers, resulting in the relocation of engine components, including relocating the battery to the boot, which freed valuable front-end space. By having the engine moved back and lower down, the VE Commodore also benefits from near-perfect 50:50 weight distribution across all variants, leading to superior handling. Crash engineers implemented several other safety initiatives, including relocating the fuel tank to be in front of the rear-axle line, instead of behind. In July 2006, Holden claimed that the VE featured one of the best body structures globally. They cited an extensive series of assessments, comprising over 5,000 simulated tests and 79 live barrier tests. Crash test results from the Australasian New Car Assessment Program (ANCAP) rate the VE lower in the offset frontal impact test than the VZ. The overall crash score was marginally higher than for the previous VZ, due to improvements in side impact protection giving a score of 27.45 out of 37, or a four-star rating out of a possible five.

In March 2008, having six airbags as standard in the MY09 update made the VE eligible for the ANCAP side pole test, yielding additional safety points. The second stage of the VE's safety rollout in October 2008, for MY09.5, included, across the VE range, the addition of an energy-absorbing steering column shroud and redesigned rear door latches. The Omega sedan, equipped with a seat belt reminder gained another point, thus allowing the model to bear a five-star rating with a score of 33.45 in December 2008. In February 2009, following the addition of a seat belt reminder in the Sportwagon range, the Omega Sportwagon was the next model to be awarded a five-star rating. Subsequent safety upgrades were extended to other VE-based models, including the Ute and WM Statesman/Caprice, with the inclusion of the seat belt reminder becoming standard as part of the MY10 update in August 2009. Consequently, all VE sedan and Sportwagon body styles, along with the extended-wheelbase WM models, received a five-star rating. The VE Ute officially received the rating on 19 October 2009, getting ANCAP five-star ratings for the entire line-up of Australian-made Holdens.

ANCAP test results* Holden Commodore Omega sedan variants (2007)
Test	Score
Overall	4 /5 stars
Frontal offset	11.45/16
Side impact	15.00/16
Pole	Not Assessed
Seat belt reminders	1/3
Whiplash protection	Not Assessed
Pedestrian protection	Poor
Electronic stability control	Standard

== Powertrains ==
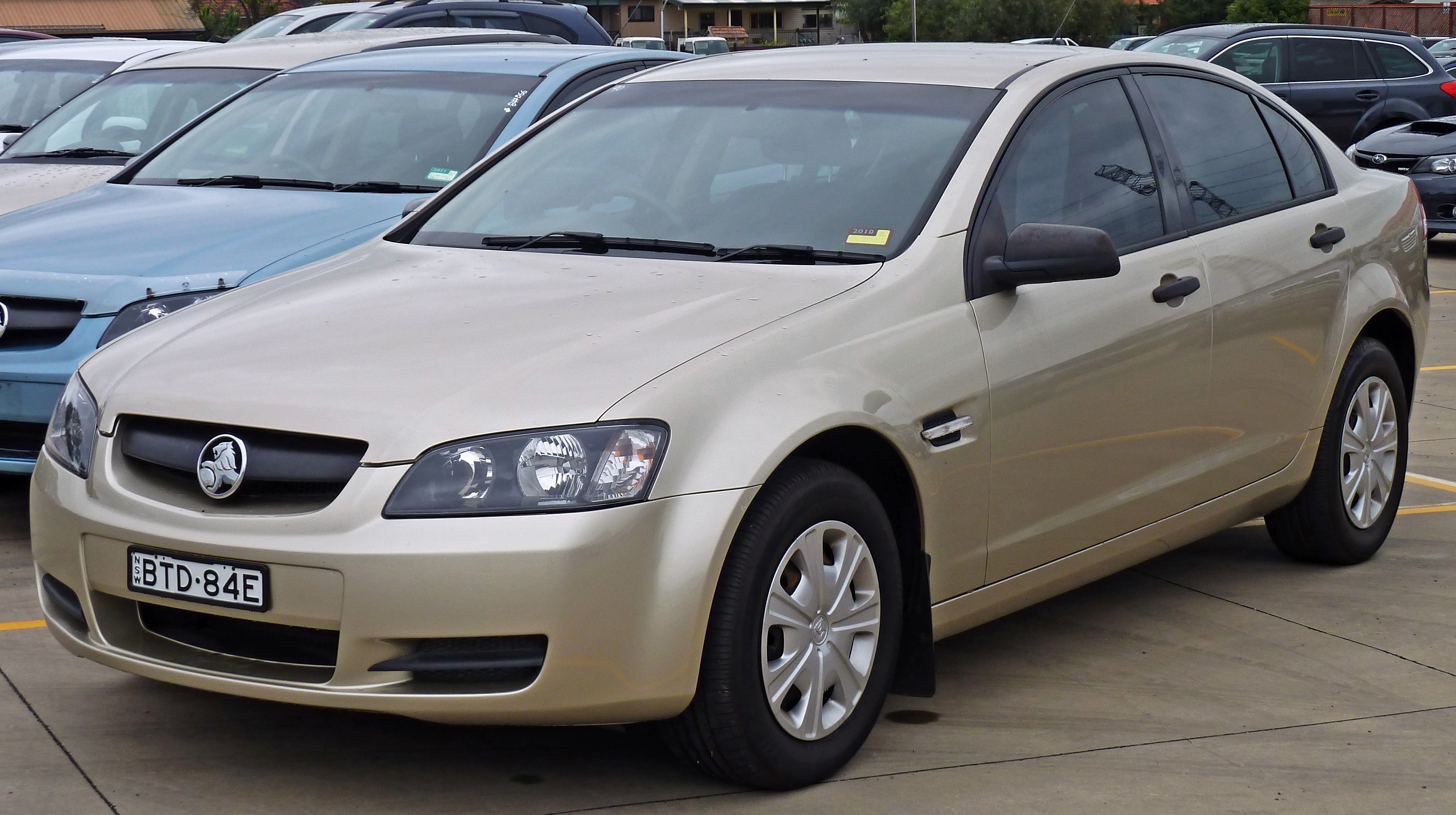
Holden introduced a bi-fuel variant of the Alloytec V6—offered in the Omega (pictured) and Berlina models—in 2006.

Holden, recognising the risks of simultaneously introducing a new platform and drivetrain, introduced the Australian-built Alloytec V6 engine derived from the proven VZ model. Adapting a proven engine design lessened the likelihood that Holden would find, and have to rectify, faults before starting production. The original base V6 benefited from power increases compared to the VZ, with engine noise decreased by implementing new timing chains, among other modifications. The four-speed GM 4L60-E automatic transmission—earlier iterations of which were first introduced to the Commodore in 1988 with the VN series—remained for this engine, with subtle alterations to its functionality. Manual transmission options were the six-speed Aisin AY6 (available with the High Output Alloytec V6) and Tremec TR6060 six-speed (for the V8), while two automatics featuring Active Select functionality were offered as the five-speed GM 5L40-E (for the High Output Alloytec V6) and six-speed GM 6L80-E (for the V8). At launch for the VE, the February 2006 onwards VZ's L76 V8 engine was eschewed in lieu of the L98, which did not include the fuel-saving Active Fuel Management (AFM) technology included with the L76.

In October 2006 Holden introduced a bi-fuel variant of the Alloytec V6, offered in the Omega and Berlina variants. This version can run on both petrol and LPG, incorporating an advanced Sequential Vapour Gas Injection system and reinforced valve seats for durability. The bi-fuel V6 delivers slightly lower performance—5 kW (7 hp) and 5 N⋅m (4 lb⋅ft) less than the conventional V6 when running on LPG—resulting in a total of 175 kW (235 hp). The engine uses a large 100 kg (220 lb) cylindrical gas tank, which results in decreased boot space and slightly increased fuel consumption. On 16 October 2006, due to a faulty fuel hose that caused a fuel smell to enter the cabin, a recall was issued that affected 1,521 V8 Commodore and WM Statesman/Caprice models, On 10 November 2006, resulting from defective rear seat belt anchors, a second recall was issued, which affected 12,830 Commodores and WM models built before 11 September 2006. On 10 April 2007, due to the possibility that the bi-fuel Commodores may have been fitted with undersized O-rings in the service valve hand tap, Holden issued a recall affecting models produced between November 2006 and April 2007. On 7 December 2007, due to the possibility that one of the fuel lines in the engine compartment may have a rub condition with a fuel vapour hose clip, possibly causing a fuel smell to become evident, another recall was issued, for over 86,000 VE and WM V6 models.

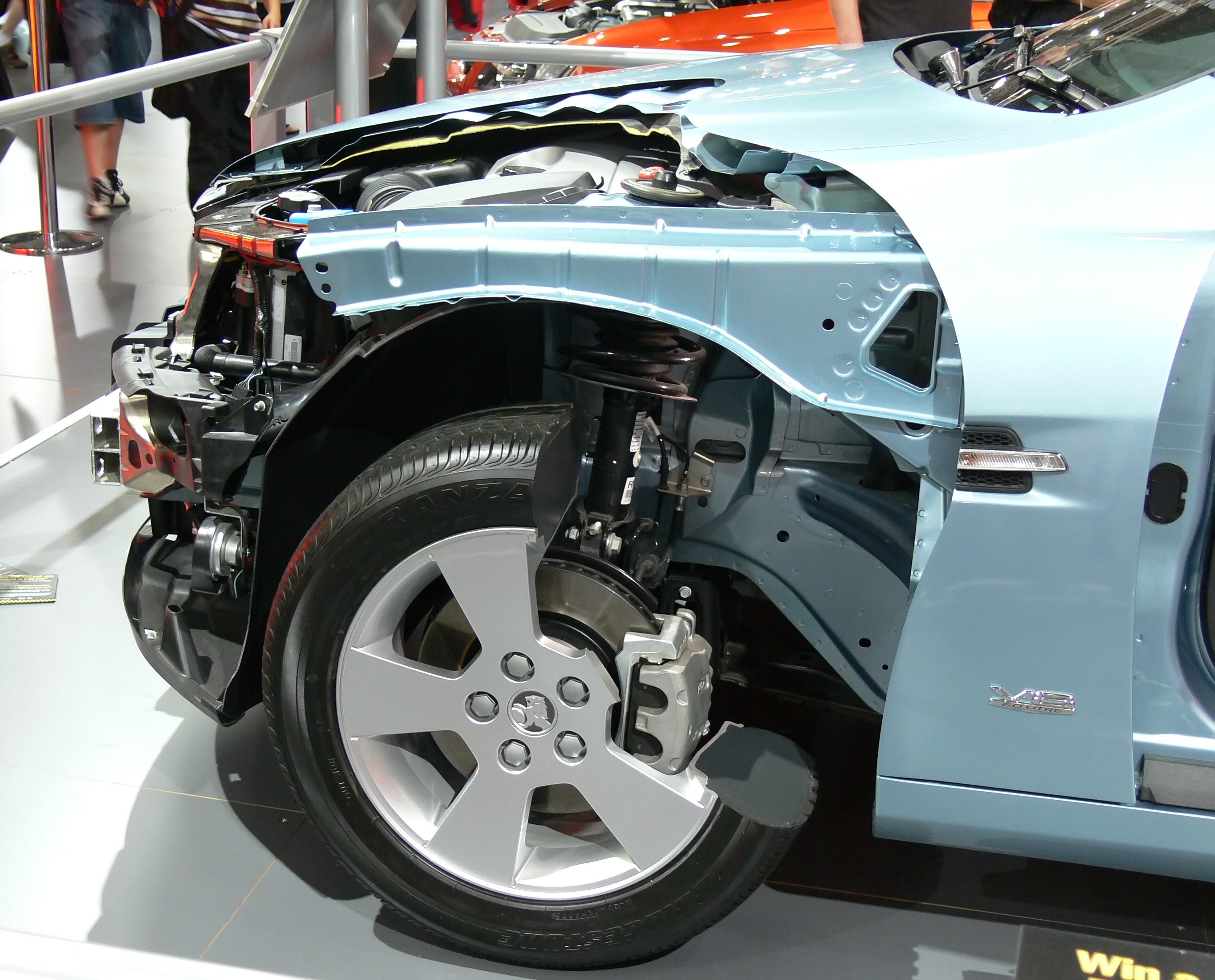
Internal cut-away revealing the VE Calais (MY07 pictured) engine bay and suspension setup

On 21 October 2008, Holden disclosed the upgrades for the MY09.5 models. Alterations involved the standardisation of the Alloytec V6 across the entire Commodore range from November 2008, whereas it was previously exclusive to the SV6 and Calais. The Omega and Berlina variants gained variable valve timing, but the "premium" dual exhaust system and the five-speed automatic were excluded. The upshot of this is an output reduction of 5 kW (7 hp) and 5 N⋅m (4 lb⋅ft) compared to the engine it replaces. Omega and Berlina sedans and Sportwagons benefit from a two and four per cent fuel efficiency improvement, respectively. Emissions had also been reduced, which allowed petrol-powered variants to achieve a Euro VI certification, an emission standard that was introduced in Europe in 2014. These changes extend further than the petrol engine, as bi-fuel LPG variants benefit from an eight per cent improvement in fuel economy when running on LPG. The LPG models produce 318 N⋅m (235 lb⋅ft), which is 7 N⋅m (5 lb⋅ft) less than before. Also announced in 2008 was a version of the 6.0-litre V8 engine featuring General Motors' AFM technology, designated L76. Originally omitted from the L98 V8, AFM contributes to enhanced fuel consumption under light engine loads. However, it was available only with models featuring an automatic transmission, and power output is reduced by 10 kilowatts (13 hp). The announcement of AFM coincided with the announcement of EcoLine, a badge highlighting Holden vehicles employing fuel-saving technologies. In the case of the VE Commodore, both AFM- and LPG-powered versions come under the EcoLine designation. On 7 April 2009, dealerships began receiving the first EcoLine-branded models.

On 4 August 2009, Holden announced the MY10 revisions to the VE and WM range. For the Omega and Berlina, the 3.6-litre Alloytec V6 was superseded by a 3.0-litre engine, the lowest engine displacement of a Commodore since the straight-six engine fitted to the 1986 VL series. The new engine received Spark Ignition Direct Injection (SIDI) technology, claimed to yield a fuel consumption reduction of up to 12 per cent. Power was increased to 190 kW (255 hp), albeit with a reduction in torque to 290 N⋅m (214 lbf⋅ft). Along with the 3.0-litre engine, a newly-developed 3.6-litre version of the same, producing 210 kW (282 hp) and 350 N⋅m (258 lbf⋅ft), was also unveiled. Other than the manual transmission version of the SV6, all SIDI V6 models are coupled to GM's 6L50 automatic transmissions and fall under Holden's EcoLine designation. Benefits to fuel economy for the 3.6-litre SIDI can also be attributed to an improved "deceleration fuel cut" system, which halts the fuel supply during engine coasting, a more efficient alternator and voltage regulator, a 50 revolution per minute (rpm) reduction in idle speed (to 550 rpm), and the incorporation of a "turbine damper", for the automatic transmission, that suppresses vibrations at low RPMs, thus enabling earlier upshifts. The Omega iterations of the Ute, as well as all bi-fuel variants, retain the 3.6-litre engine coupled with a four-speed automatic transmission, but alterations were made to the LPG engine to achieve additional gains in efficiency.

In late August 2010, significant updates were introduced with the MY11 Series II upgrades. The Omega versions of the Ute were upgraded to the 3.0-litre SIDI engine paired with a six-speed automatic transmission, as used in the sedan and wagon versions. Holden also modified the 3.0-litre V6 to accept E85 bio-ethanol, in addition to petrol, stating that using E85 provides a sizeable increase in performance and reduces CO_{2} emissions between 20 and 40 per cent, depending on the distance the fuel is transported from the production site to the filling station. In September 2011, E85 compatibility was extended to the 3.6-litre V6 as part of the MY12 update.

Eng. disp.; configuration	Engine	Power (Note: Power figures are measured in accordance with the ECE standard.)	Torque	Transmission	Fuel type	Fuel consumption (sedan)	Production	Ref.
3.6 L (3,564 cc); V6	Alloytec (LE0)	180 kW (241 hp)	330 N⋅m (243 lbf⋅ft)	4-speed GM 4L60-E automatic	Petrol	10.9 L/100 km (21.6 mpg_{‑US})	2006–2007	
3.6 L (3,564 cc); V6	Alloytec (LE0)	180 kW (241 hp)	330 N⋅m (243 lbf⋅ft)	4-speed GM 4L60-E automatic	Petrol	10.8 L/100 km (21.8 mpg_{‑US})	2007–2008	
3.6 L (3,564 cc); V6	Alloytec (LE0)	175 kW (235 hp)	325 N⋅m (240 lbf⋅ft)	4-speed GM 4L60-E automatic	Petrol	10.6 L/100 km (22.2 mpg_{‑US})	2008–2009	
3.6 L (3,564 cc); V6	Alloytec (LE0)	175 kW (235 hp)	325 N⋅m (240 lbf⋅ft)	4-speed GM 4L60-E automatic	Petrol/LPG (bi-fuel) (Note: Performance and fuel economy figures attained when running on LPG. The engine will produce the same figures as the conventional Alloytec V6 when run on petrol, with economy rated at 11.7 L/100 km (20.1 mpg_{‑US}) for the original-release engine.)	16.0 L/100 km (14.7 mpg_{‑US})	2006–2007	
3.6 L (3,564 cc); V6	Alloytec (LE0)	175 kW (235 hp)	325 N⋅m (240 lbf⋅ft)	4-speed GM 4L60-E automatic	Petrol/LPG (bi-fuel)	15.5 L/100 km (15.2 mpg_{‑US})	2007–2008	
3.6 L (3,564 cc); V6	Alloytec (LE0)	175 kW (235 hp)	318 N⋅m (235 lb⋅ft)	4-speed GM 4L60-E automatic	Petrol/LPG (bi-fuel)	14.2 L/100 km (16.6 mpg_{‑US})	2008–2009	
3.6 L (3,564 cc); V6	Alloytec (LE0)	175 kW (235 hp)	318 N⋅m (235 lb⋅ft)	4-speed GM 4L60-E automatic	Petrol/LPG (bi-fuel)	13.4 L/100 km (17.6 mpg_{‑US})	2009–2012	
3.6 L (3,564 cc); V6	High Output Alloytec (LY7)	195 kW (261 hp)	340 N⋅m (251 lbf⋅ft)	6-speed Aisin AY6 manual	Petrol	11.0 L/100 km (21.4 mpg_{‑US})	2006–2009	
3.6 L (3,564 cc); V6	High Output Alloytec (LY7)	195 kW (261 hp)	340 N⋅m (251 lbf⋅ft)	5-speed GM 5L40-E automatic	Petrol	11.3 L/100 km (20.8 mpg_{‑US})	2006–2009	
3.0 L (2,997 cc); V6	SIDI (LF1)	190 kW (255 hp)	290 N⋅m (214 lbf⋅ft)	6-speed GM 6L50 automatic	Petrol	9.3 L/100 km (25.3 mpg_{‑US})	2009–2010	
3.0 L (2,997 cc); V6	SIDI (LF1)	190 kW (255 hp)	290 N⋅m (214 lbf⋅ft)	6-speed GM 6L50 automatic	Petrol/E85	9.1 L/100 km (25.8 mpg_{‑US})	2010–2011	
3.0 L (2,997 cc); V6	SIDI (LF1)	190 kW (255 hp)	290 N⋅m (214 lbf⋅ft)	6-speed GM 6L50 automatic	Petrol/E85	8.9 L/100 km (26.4 mpg_{‑US})	2011–2013	
3.6 L (3,564 cc); V6	SIDI (LLT)	210 kW (282 hp)	350 N⋅m (258 lbf⋅ft)	6-speed Aisin AY6 manual	Petrol	10.2 L/100 km (23.1 mpg_{‑US})	2009–2010	
3.6 L (3,564 cc); V6	SIDI (LLT)	210 kW (282 hp)	350 N⋅m (258 lbf⋅ft)	6-speed Aisin AY6 manual	Petrol	9.8 L/100 km (24.0 mpg_{‑US})	2010–2013	
3.6 L (3,564 cc); V6	SIDI (LLT)	210 kW (282 hp)	350 N⋅m (258 lbf⋅ft)	6-speed GM 6L50 automatic	Petrol	9.9 L/100 km (23.8 mpg_{‑US})	2009–2010	
3.6 L (3,564 cc); V6	SIDI (LLT)	210 kW (282 hp)	350 N⋅m (258 lbf⋅ft)	6-speed GM 6L50 automatic	Petrol	9.8 L/100 km (24.0 mpg_{‑US})	2010–2011	
3.6 L (3,564 cc); V6	SIDI (LFX)	210 kW (282 hp)	350 N⋅m (258 lbf⋅ft)	6-speed GM 6L50 automatic	Petrol/E85	9.5 L/100 km (24.8 mpg_{‑US})	2011–2013	
3.6 L (3,564 cc); V6	SIDI (LWR)	180 kW (241 hp)	320 N⋅m (236 lbf⋅ft)	6-speed GM 6L50 automatic	LPG	12.3 L/100 km (19.1 mpg_{‑US})	2012–2013	
6.0 L (5,967 cc); V8	Generation 4 Alloy (L98)	270 kW (362 hp)	530 N⋅m (391 lbf⋅ft)	6-speed Tremec T-56 manual	Petrol	14.4 L/100 km (16.3 mpg_{‑US})	2006–2009	
6.0 L (5,967 cc); V8	Generation 4 Alloy (L98)	270 kW (362 hp)	530 N⋅m (391 lbf⋅ft)	6-speed Tremec T-56 manual	Petrol	13.7 L/100 km (17.2 mpg_{‑US})	2009–2010	
6.0 L (5,967 cc); V8	Generation 4 Alloy (L98)	270 kW (362 hp)	530 N⋅m (391 lbf⋅ft)	6-speed GM 6L80-E automatic	Petrol	14.3 L/100 km (16.4 mpg_{‑US})	2006–2009	
6.0 L (5,967 cc); V8	Generation 4 Alloy (AFM) (L76)	260 kW (349 hp)	517 N⋅m (381 lb⋅ft)	6-speed GM 6L80-E automatic	Petrol	12.9 L/100 km (18.2 mpg_{‑US})	2009	
6.0 L (5,967 cc); V8	Generation 4 Alloy (AFM) (L76)	260 kW (349 hp)	517 N⋅m (381 lb⋅ft)	6-speed GM 6L80-E automatic	Petrol	12.6 L/100 km (18.7 mpg_{‑US})	2009–2010	
6.0 L (5,967 cc); V8	Generation 4 Alloy (L77)	270 kW (362 hp)	530 N⋅m (391 lbf⋅ft)	6-speed Tremec T-56 manual	Petrol/E85	12.2 L/100 km (19.3 mpg_{‑US})	2010–2013	
6.0 L (5,967 cc); V8	Generation 4 Alloy (AFM) (L77)	260 kW (349 hp)	517 N⋅m (381 lb⋅ft)	6-speed GM 6L80-E automatic	Petrol/E85	12.6 L/100 km (18.7 mpg_{‑US})	2010–2011	
6.0 L (5,967 cc); V8	Generation 4 Alloy (AFM) (L77)	260 kW (349 hp)	517 N⋅m (381 lb⋅ft)	6-speed GM 6L80-E automatic	Petrol/E85	12.3 L/100 km (19.1 mpg_{‑US})	2011–2013	

== Models ==
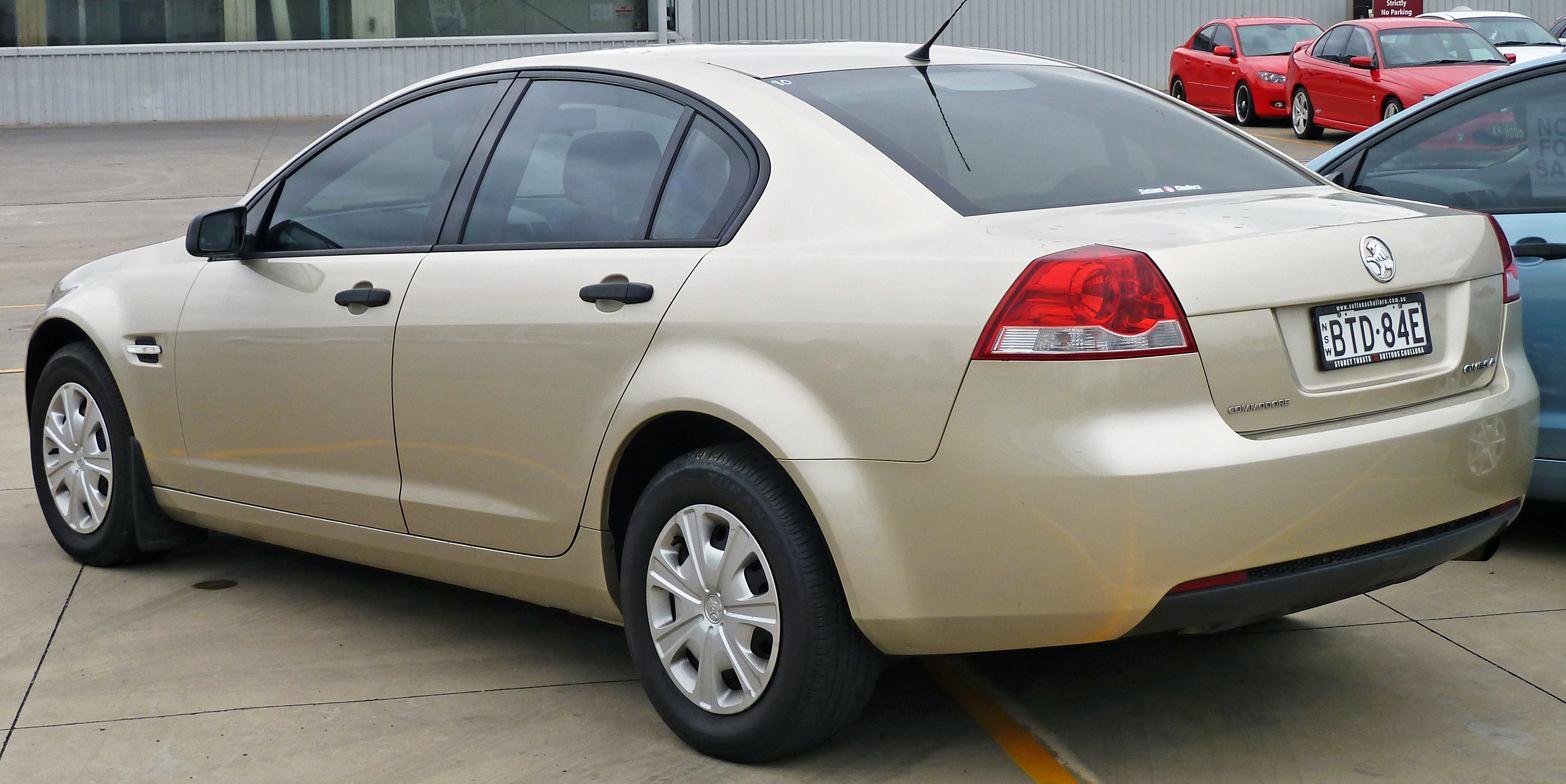
MY07 Commodore Omega sedan

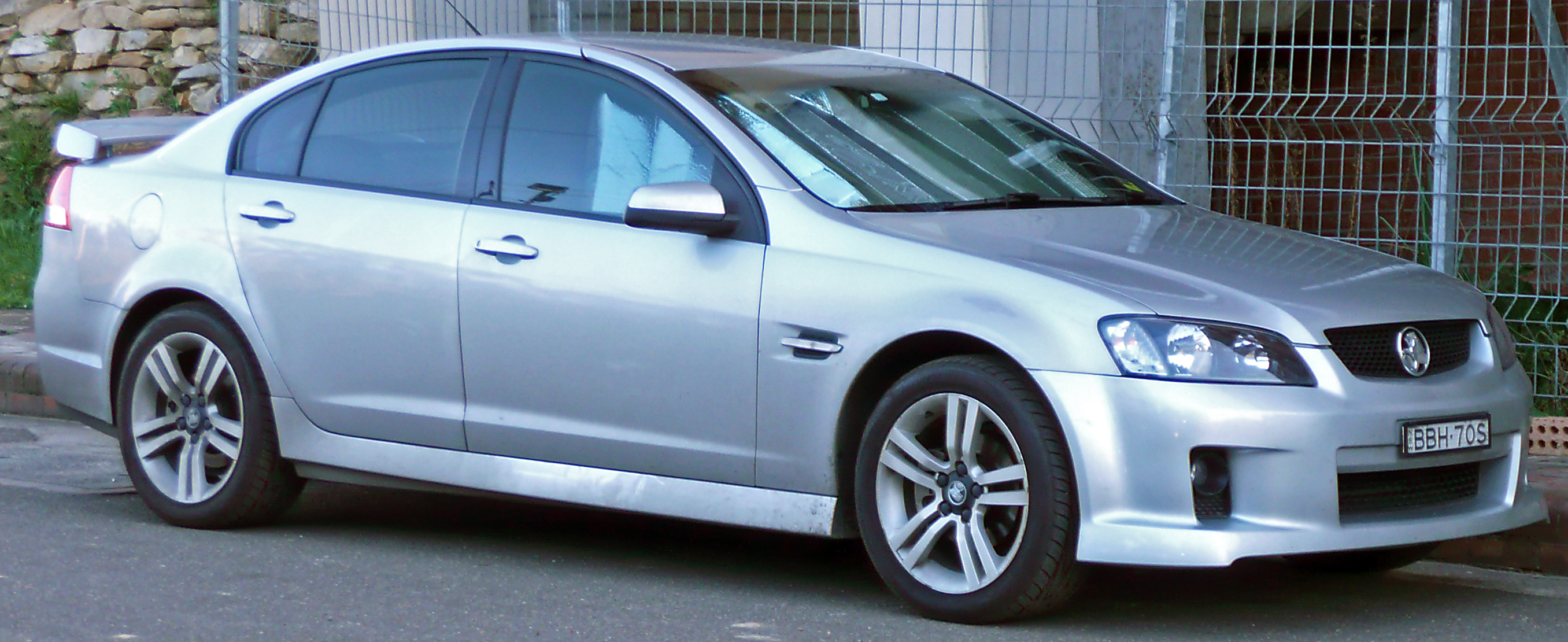

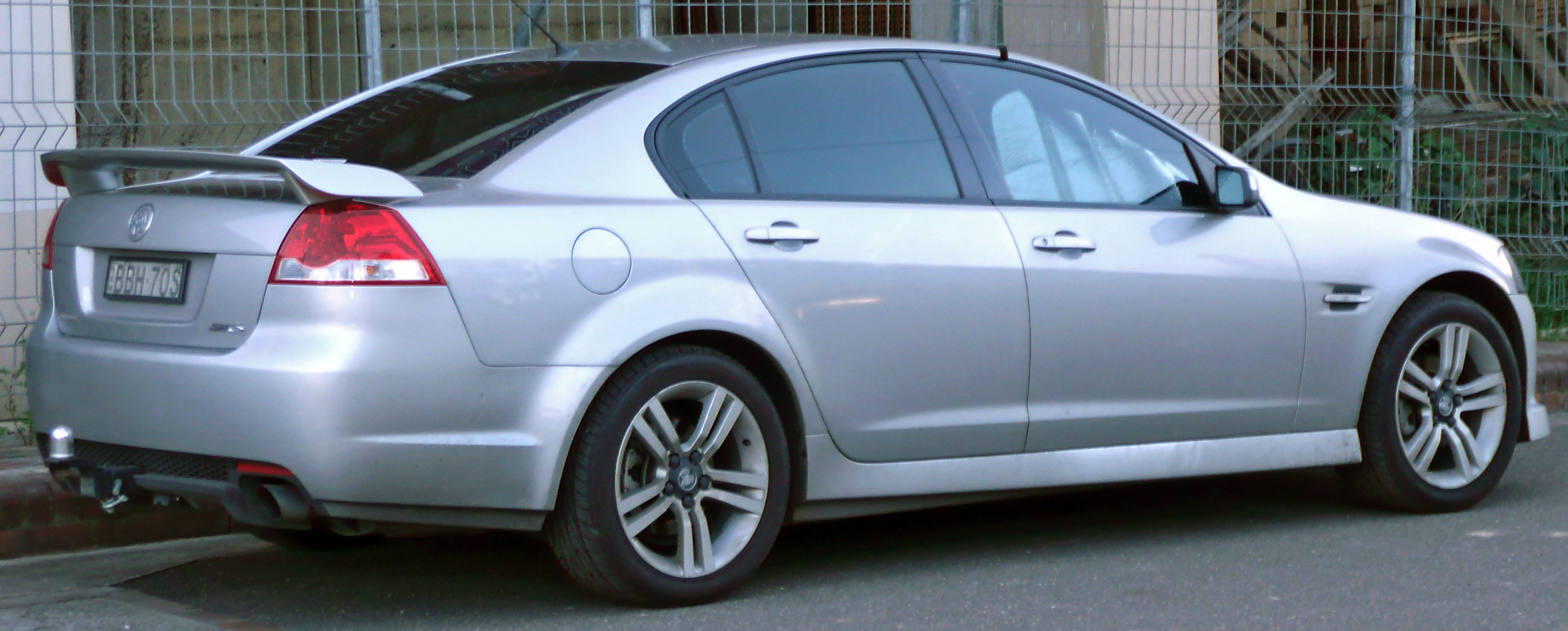
MY06 Commodore SV6 sedan

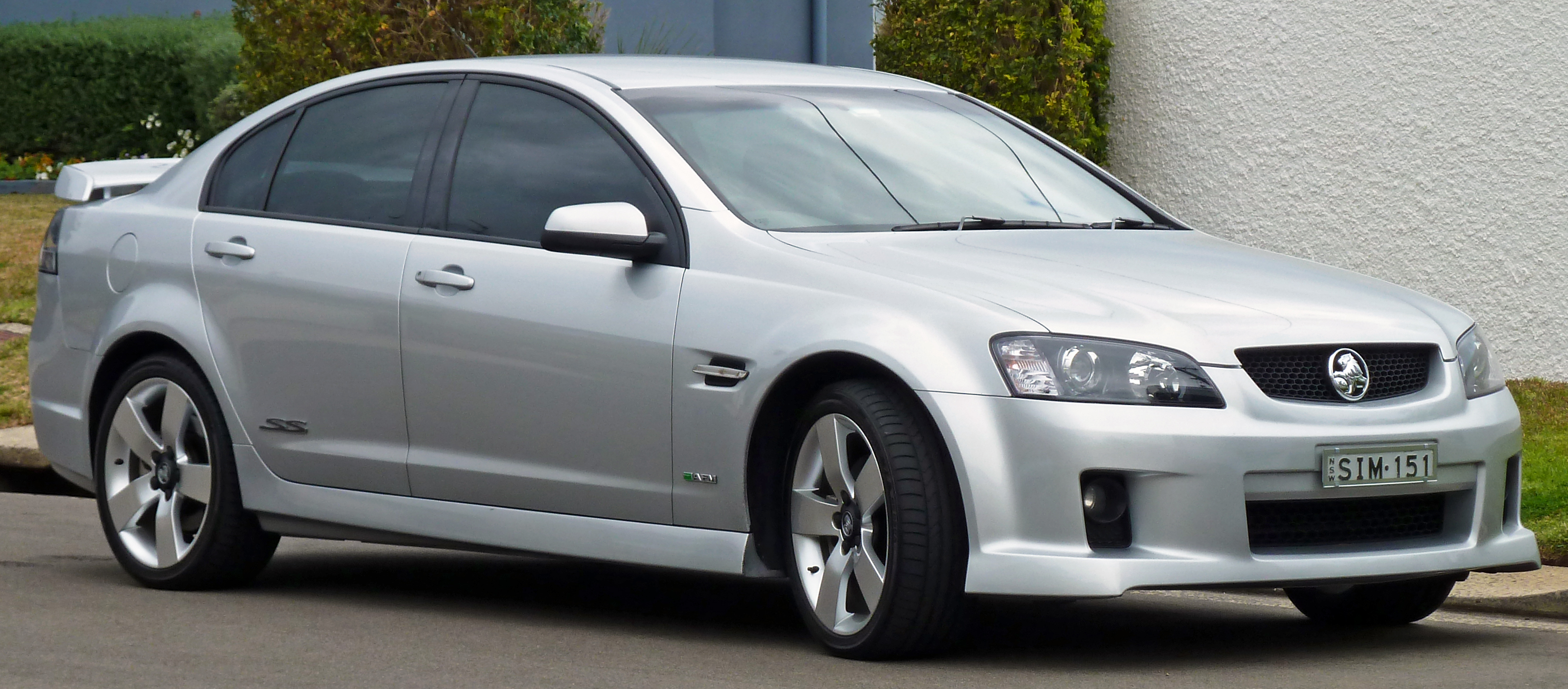

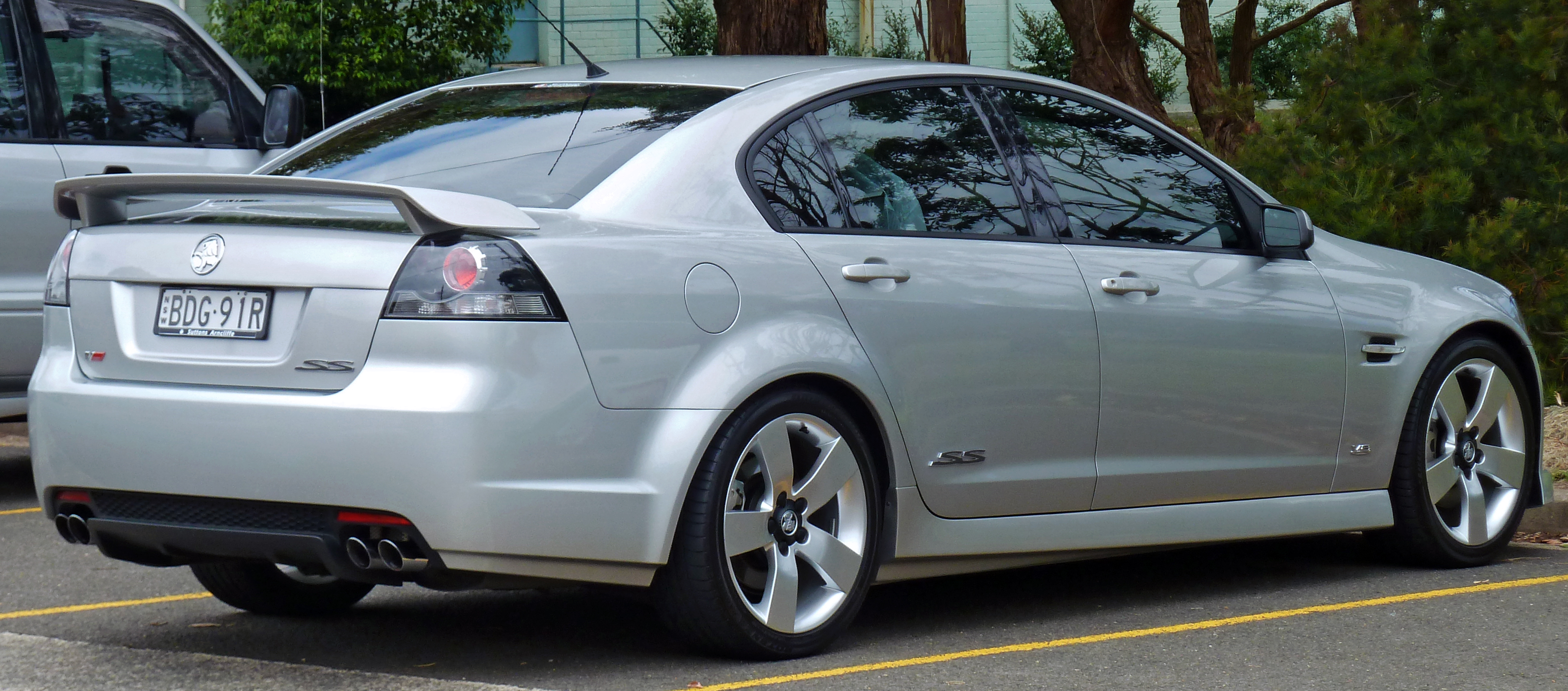
MY09 Commodore SS V sedan

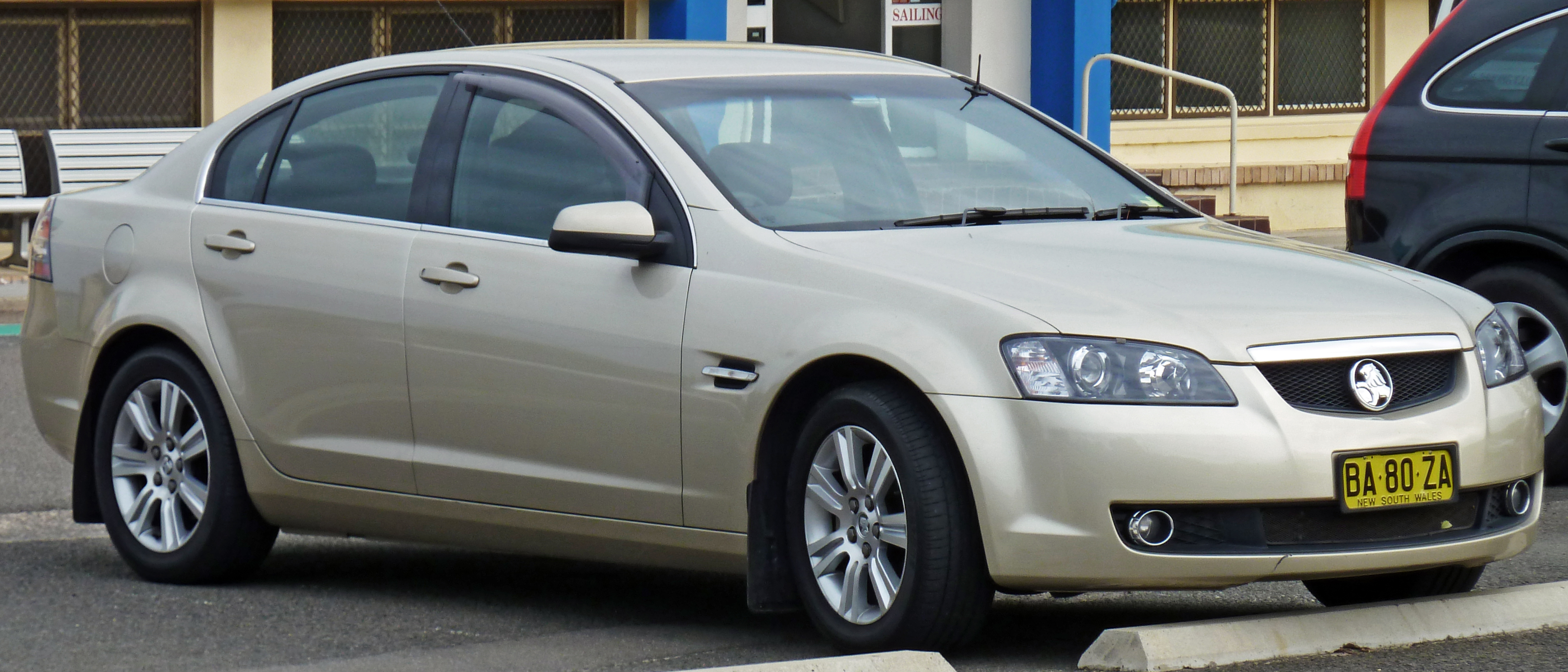

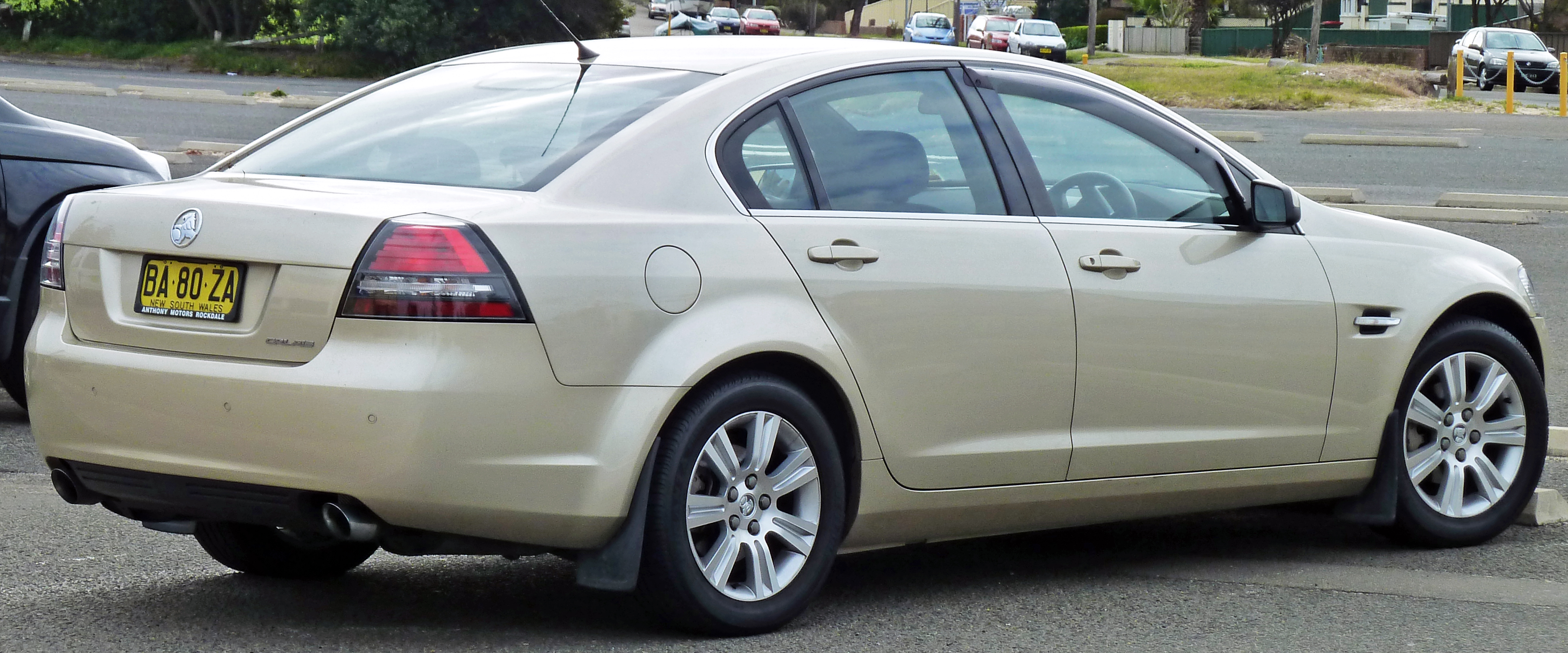
MY09 Calais V sedan

=== Commodore Omega ===
Replacing both the Commodore Executive and Acclaim, the Omega was the entry-level option with basic standard equipment. The most significant gain over the Executive was inclusion of the Bosch version 8.0 electronic stability control system as a standard feature across the range. The Omega, along with all VE models, came with a "space saver" spare tyre, which faced criticism. Concerns were raised about its practicality; the Royal Automobile Club of Victoria published studies indicating that these thinner, temporary spare tyres significantly degrade a car's driving dynamics. Holden argued that the "space saver" spare tyre was a weight-saving feature. Critics also highlighted the absence of standard air conditioning for the Omega model; this was rectified with the MY09 upgrade of the Omega.

Holden offered five limited edition models based on the Commodore Omega. Launched in the middle of 2006, the V-Series Commodore featured a sports-oriented body kit, 17-inch alloy wheels, a rear spoiler, colour-matched wing mirrors and exterior door handles. The Lumina model was launched in June 2007. In addition to the features of the Omega, it included Bluetooth phone connectivity and rear parking sensors. On 1 May 2008, the 60th Anniversary model was released to commemorate the sixtieth anniversary of the 48–215—the company's first model. It included unique 18-inch alloy wheels, leather seat inserts and special "60th Anniversary" badging. Available from March 2009 in sedan and Sportwagon variants, the International models featured alloy wheels from the Calais V, front fog lamps, a six-disc CD changer, leather trim and Bluetooth connectivity.

In October 2009, a revamped Omega was introduced; it came with a choice of a 3.0-litre SIDI V6 engine with a six-speed automatic transmission, or a 3.6-litre LPG Alloytec V6 with a four-speed automatic (sedan only), as well as 18-inch alloy wheels and a Berlina grille. To commemorate the discontinuation of the VE before the introduction of the VF models, a Z Series Commodore—released on 5 September 2012—was designed to combine luxury and sports features to appeal to a wide audience. Available in the Omega, SV6, SS and SS V variants, it offered leather seats (in Omega and SS V), Bluetooth connectivity, rear parking sensors, a rear parking camera and alloy wheels in various sizes. The series was available in sedan, Sportwagon and Ute body styles, with minimal variations between the three.

=== Commodore SV6 ===
The SV6 builds on the Omega, with a more powerful High Output version of the Alloytec V6 engine, paired with either a six-speed manual or a five-speed automatic transmission. Unlike the launch Omega, air conditioning comes standard in the SV6. It also featured the "FE2" suspension, which incorporates a lowered body, firmer springs and heavier dampers. The SV6 possesses a Performance-style interior, in contrast to the Omega's Functional-style interior. The SV6 Z Series, launched on 5 September 2012, was introduced alongside the Omega model; as aforementioned, this series was designed to clear out the final VE models before the introduction of the VF. While the Z Series retained the same mechanical components as the standard SV6, it featured several enhancements, including 19-inch alloy wheels, leather-bolstered seats, Z Series badging, custom carpets, a rearview camera and rear parking sensors.

=== Commodore VE SS ===
The Commodore SS uses the 6.0-litre V8 engine and T-56 six-speed manual transmission, and has quad exhaust outlets. In both 2006 and 2007 the SS won the Motor magazine's "Bang For Your Bucks" award. The subsequent introduction of the SS V marked Holden's first application of the "V-Series" naming convention on a series-produced car, which was implemented to differentiate specific models from special-edition programmes. The SS V offers extra luxuries at a similar price point to the preceding SS. Its interior is distinguished by the metallic-style pedals and instruments matched with the exterior colour. The entire dashboard could be optioned in bright red, orange and black. The exterior of the SS V exhibits five-spoke 19-inch alloy wheels, with the option of larger 20-inch wheels.

Holden produced two special editions of the VE SS, starting with the SS V 60th Anniversary, which was released on 1 May 2008. It incorporated various additional features over the standard SS V, including 10-spoke 20-inch alloy wheels, satellite navigation, rear parking sensors, a high-mounted rear spoiler, chrome exterior door handle accents and "60th Anniversary" badging and floor mats. After the Pontiac brand was discontinued in North America in 2009, Holden fitted approximately 1,500 Commodore SS Vs with the Pontiac G8 front-end fascia and other features. This special edition was unveiled at the Deniliquin Ute Muster on 2 October 2009, with sales beginning in November. The SS V-Series Special Edition was produced in three body styles—sedan, utility and Sportwagon—with 500 units of each, unlike the G8, which was available only as a sedan.

=== Berlina ===
As the mid-range VE model, the Berlina has equipment similar to that of the Omega. The exterior styling is similar to the Omega but has extra touches, such as larger tail lights, front fog lamps, seven-spoke 17-inch alloy wheels and the Luxury-type interior. The Berlina International was based on the Series II Berlina and was available as both a sedan or wagon. It includes leather trim, 18-inch alloy wheels and a rear camera to facilitate safe reversing.

=== Calais ===
The Calais—the flagship of the VE range—pairs the High Output Alloytec V6 engine with the five-speed automatic transmission. Like the SS, an upscale V-Series edition was available. Two special editions of the Calais were produced. Based on the Series I model, the Calais V International was available with V6 or V8 engine and automatic transmission. The model features 19-inch alloy wheels, chrome exterior door handles, colour satellite navigation and alloy-faced pedals. The Calais V 60th Anniversary Edition features an electronic sunroof, 19-inch alloy wheels, a leather interior, alloy-faced pedals and chrome exterior door handles.

== Model year changes ==
Like the VZ model before it, the fourth generation of the Commodore continued the tradition of significant updates, often marked by new model designations—such as the third-generation update of the VT, followed by the VX, VY and VZ models—interspersed with "Series II" and, occasionally, "Series III" revisions. Throughout the VE's lifespan, Holden also introduced a series of changes to the car, identified by the model year (MY).

=== Series I ===
The MY09 models were launched on 15 March 2008. Six airbags became the standard across the range, replacing the previous two airbags in the Omega variant and four in the SV6. Standard features—such as air conditioning, 16-inch alloy wheels, body-coloured wing mirrors and door handles and a new grille insert with chrome accents—were added to the Omega models. The subsequent MY09.5 upgrades affected models ordered from 21 October 2008 and produced from November of that year. These updates included standardising the instrument cluster illumination and removing the turn-by-turn navigation and Berlina V8 options. The "premium" version of the Alloytec V6 was introduced to the Omega and Berlina, offering improved fuel consumption with a slight reduction in engine output (see above). Various safety upgrades were also implemented (see above). Additional MY09.5 changes were introduced in March 2009. The space-saver spare wheel was discontinued, with two options offered instead: a lightweight tyre inflator kit or a full-size spare wheel. The Sportwagon body styles of the Calais V and SS V variants received an alloy spare wheel if the full-size spare were chosen, while the remainder of the line-up received a steel-wheel spare. Holden also replaced the dark-grey horizontal dashboard strip and steering wheel spokes on the SV6, SS and SS V with a matte silver finish. Safety upgrades introduced to the Omega sedan in October were also added to the Omega Sportwagon (see above).

The MY10 versions of the VE series were released in September 2009, featuring new 3.0-litre and 3.6-litre V6 engines with Spark Ignition Direct Injection (SIDI) technology, paired with a new six-speed automatic transmission (see above). These updated powertrains were branded under Holden's EcoLine range, with all SIDI models identifiable by repositioned EcoLine badges and, for the 3.0-litre models, twin exhaust outlets. The updated models also include recalibrated suspension and an additional ball joint in the rear suspension. A sturdier, 24 mm (0.94 in)-thick rear anti-roll bar was also added. Enhanced engine-bay sound insulation and a new muffler have reduced noise, vibration and harshness, while lighter, low-rolling-resistance tyres further improve fuel efficiency. The MY10 update introduced the Tremec TR-6060 six-speed manual transmission with an upgraded clutch.

=== Series II ===
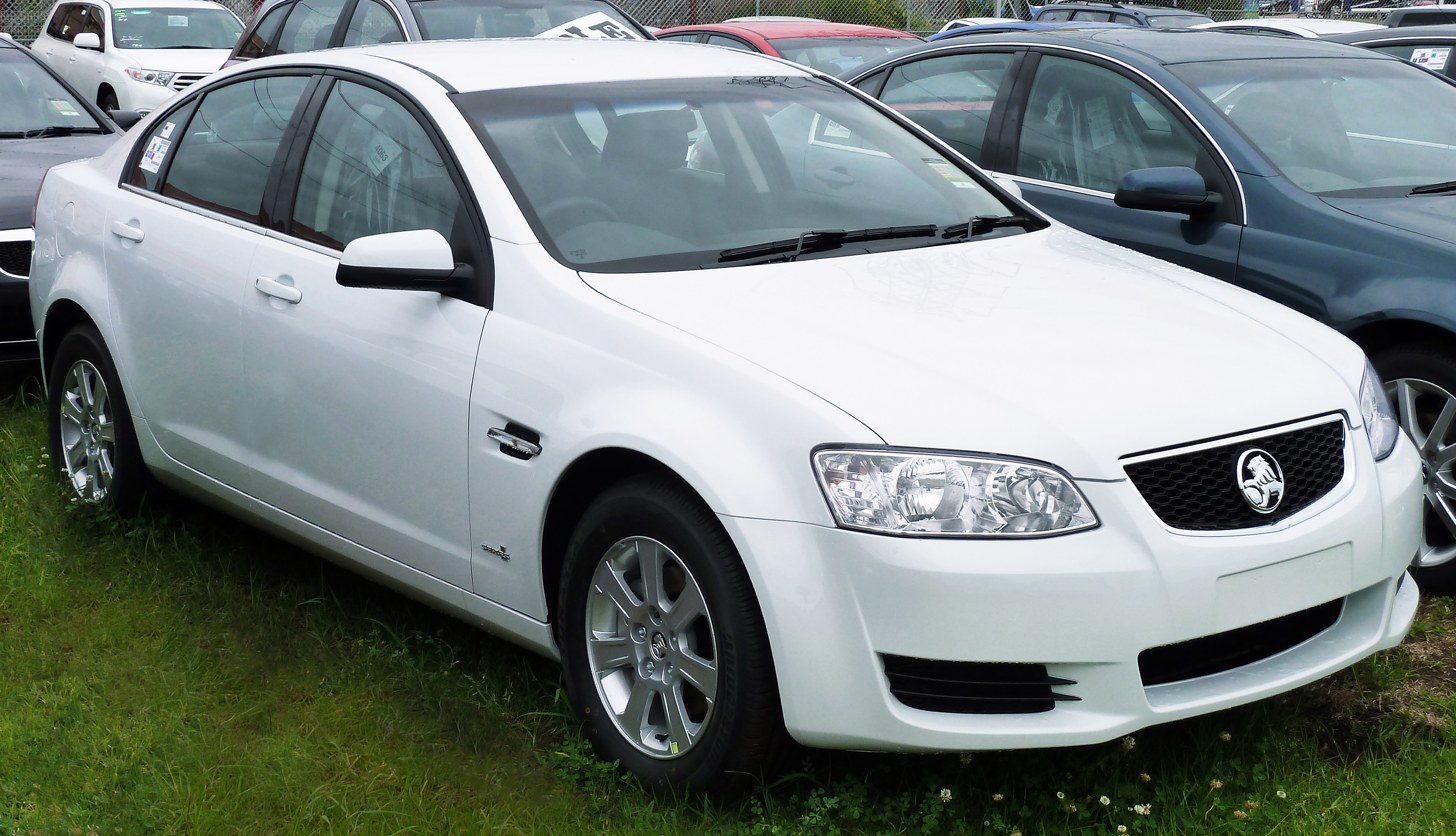

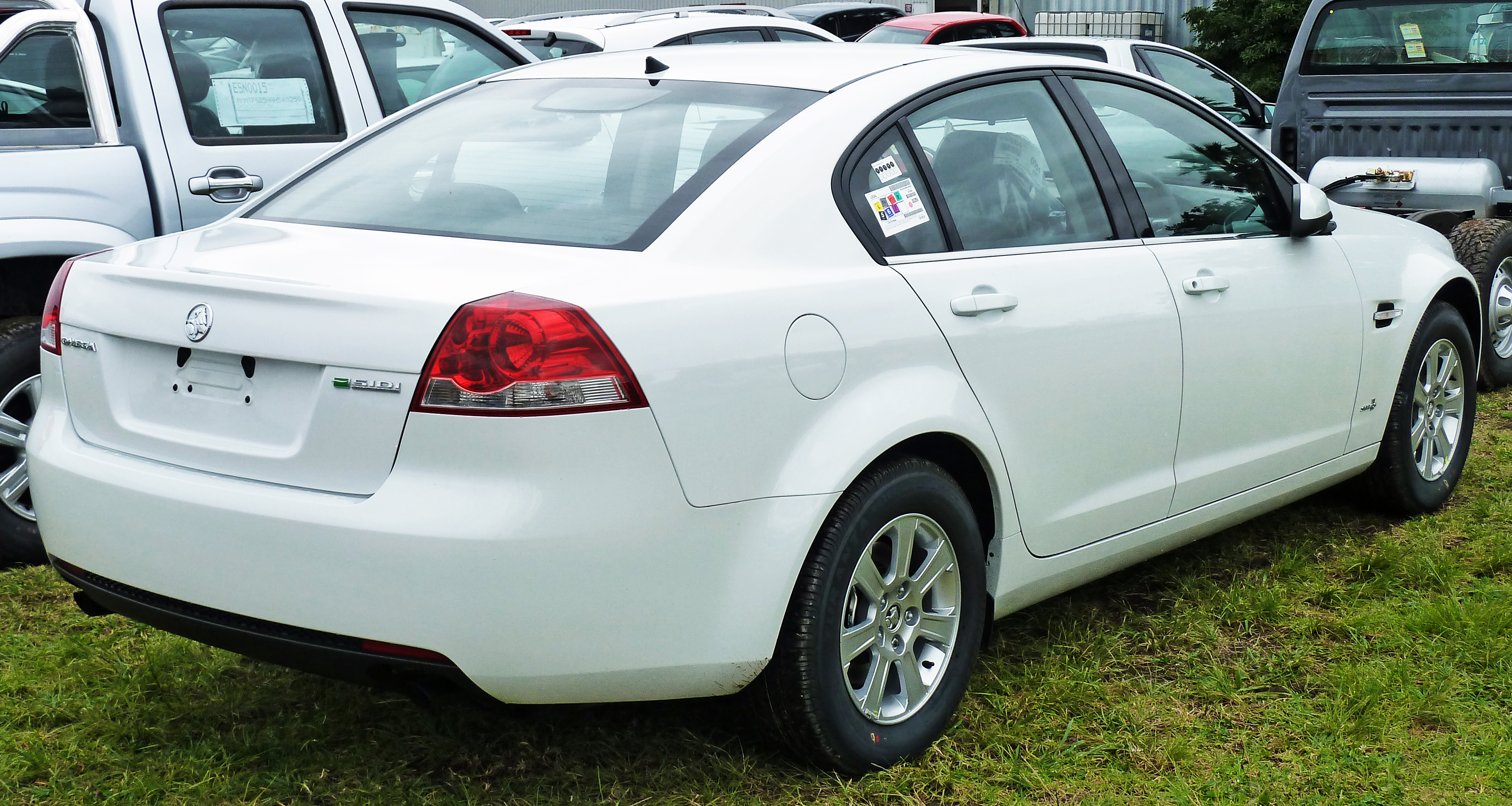
MY11 Commodore Omega sedan

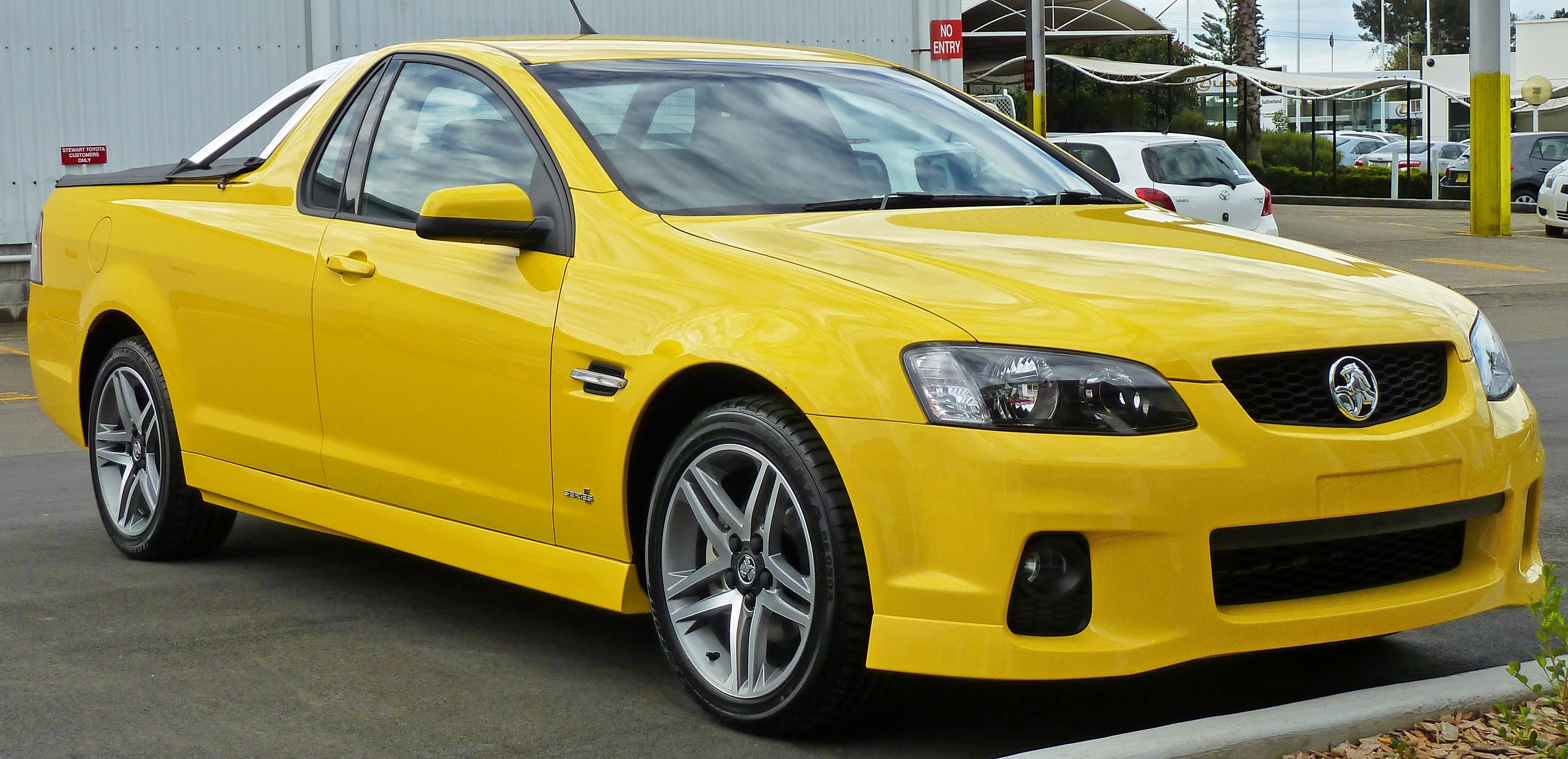

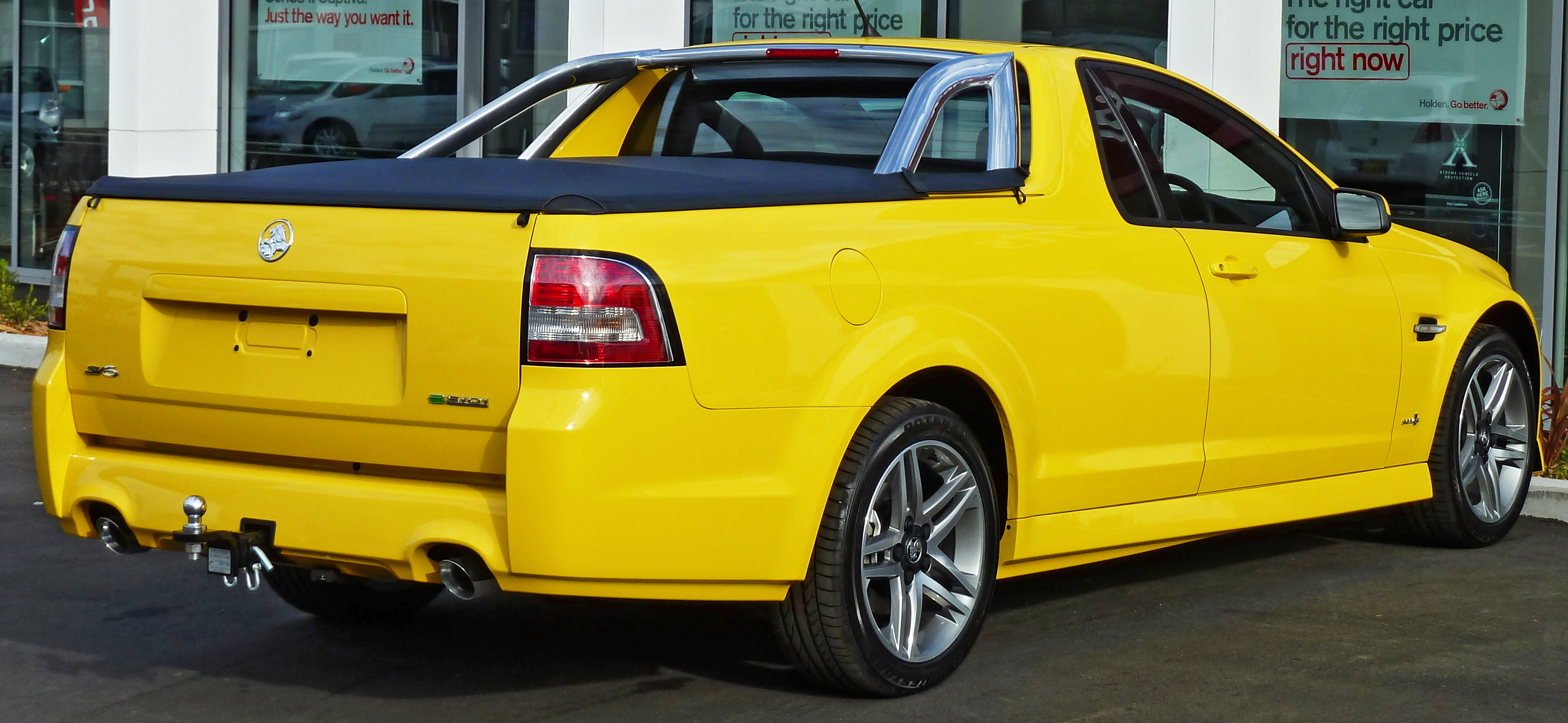
MY11 Ute SV6

The MY11 revisions introduced identifiable styling updates across the range. Models produced since were marketed by Holden as the "Series II". Announced on 31 August 2010, and launched on 10 September, the MY11 series brought extensive styling updates across the VE range, including redesigned front fascias, aerodynamic lip detailing on sedan decklids, and new alloy wheels on Berlina and higher models. Front fascia revisions included reshaped headlamps, revamped bumpers and a larger grille with new inserts tailored to each model. The update introduced a new 6.5-inch touchscreen in a redesigned centre console stack, along with updated dashboards, reconfigured controls, modified ventilation outlets and refreshed trim and lighting colours. SV6, SS and SS V models received unique circular air vents.

The MY11 update introduced flex-fuel capability for the 3.0-litre V6 and 6.0-litre V8 engines, enabling them to operate on E85 bio-ethanol. Holden also launched a new "Redline" sports package option for V-Series models. This package included lightweight, forged, polished 19-inch multi-spoke alloy wheels from the Pontiac G8 GXP. Other Redline features included high-performance Brembo four-piston brakes, stiffer "FE3" suspension and a tyre inflator kit on the Redline Ute. The 6.5-inch "Holden-iQ" infotainment system, developed by Siemens VDO, was made standard on the Omega, SS and SS V models, integrating media playback and control functions. The iQ head unit replaced the previous mechanical CD stacker with a single slot and flash-drive storage capable of holding approximately 15 CDs worth of music. Additional features included iPod integration, USB and auxiliary inputs, Bluetooth connectivity for calls, and music streaming.

Holden began production of the MY12-update Commodore on 6 September 2011, following a 2 September announcement detailing limited mechanical changes focused on efficiency improvements and the introduction of E85 fuel compatibility for the 3.6-litre SIDI V6 engine. The cosmetic updates included new features across various models: the Omega received seven-spoke 16-inch alloy wheels and chrome accents on the lower outboard fascia inserts, while the Berlina was fitted with chrome-trimmed fog light surrounds. The Calais V model added a new boot lip spoiler, which was also made available as an accessory for other MY12 sedan models. The SV6 and SS models incorporated a chrome-highlighted lower spoiler and front grille surround, with the V-Series versions of the SS also featuring additional chrome-accented lower outboard inserts. The Redline editions of the SS V featured redesigned 19-inch wheels, red-painted brake callipers and the "FE3" suspension option extended to include the Sportwagon and Ute body styles.

== HSV range (E Series) ==
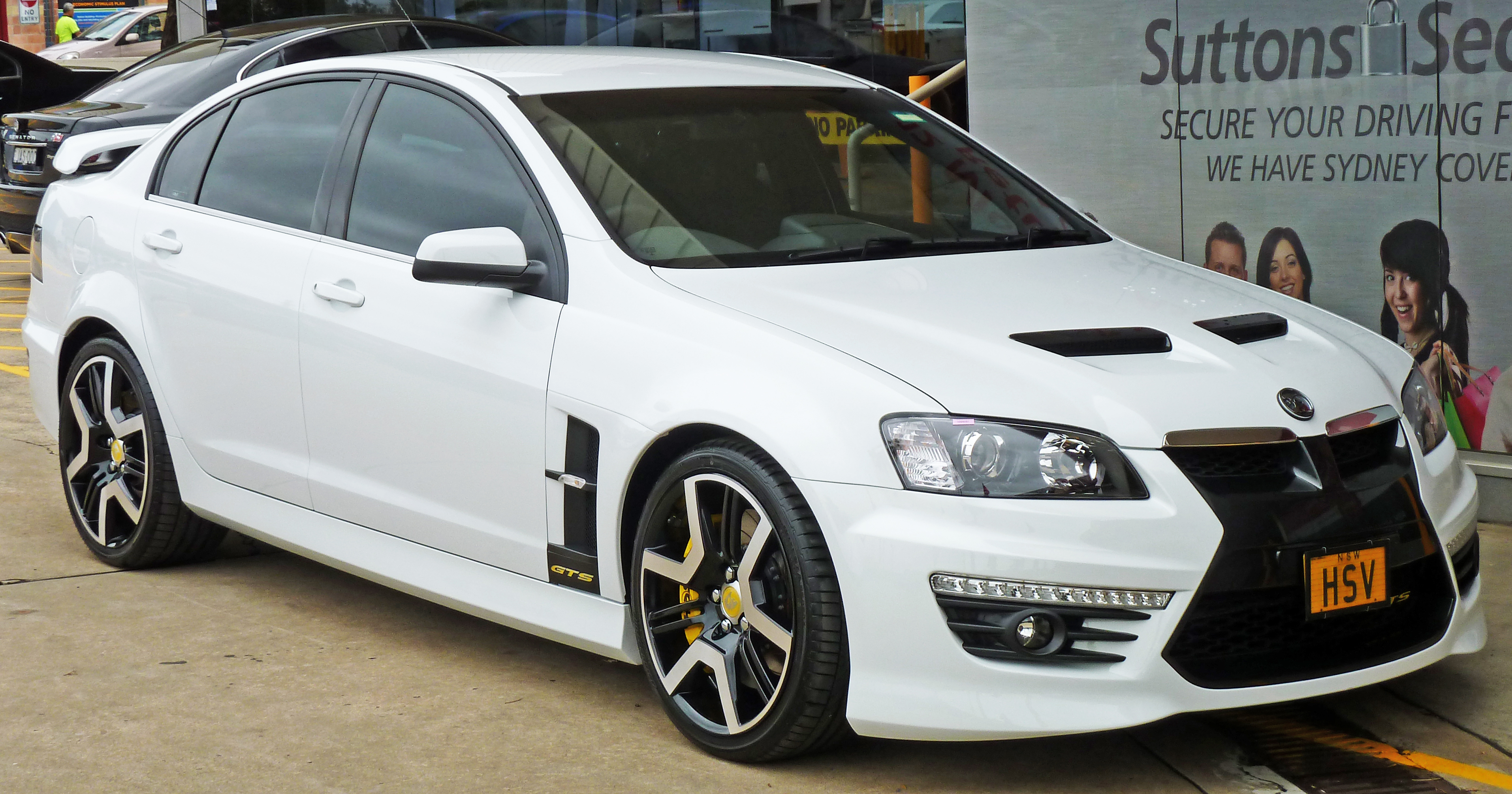
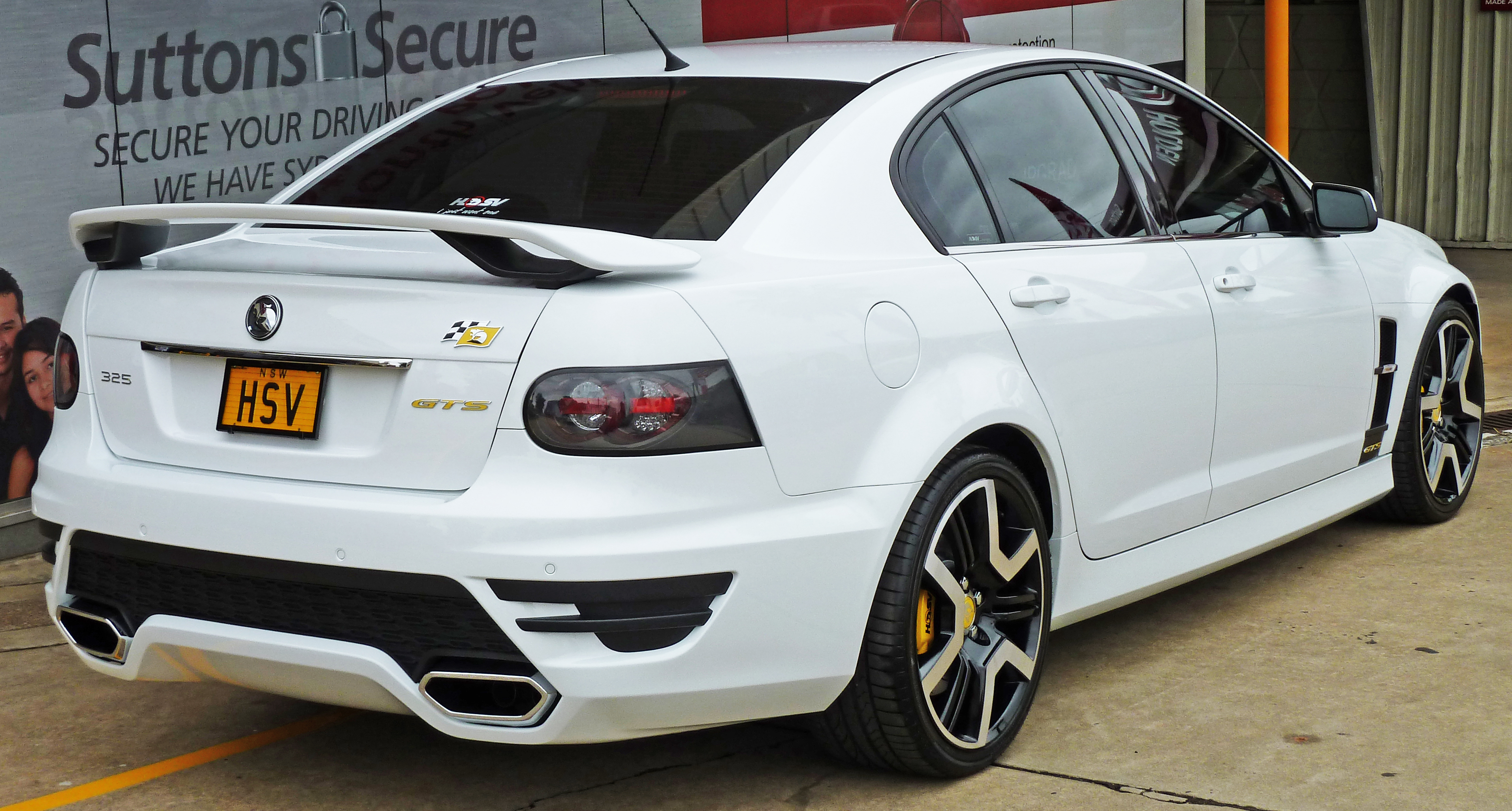
HSV GTS E Series 3 MY11

Holden marketed the high-performance versions of the VE Commodore through its performance division, Holden Special Vehicles (HSV), as the E Series. Launched in August 2006, the E Series lineup included the Clubsport, Maloo, Senator, and GTS models. The lineup featured distinctive styling elements, including LED taillights and vertical front wing grilles, and were initially powered by a 6.0-litre LS2 V8 engine, which was replaced by a 6.2-litre LS3 V8 in 2008. The E Series 2 was released in 2010; the update introduced a facelift with new bumpers, a twin-nostril bonnet, launch control and stability control with normal and competition modes. With the introduction of the E Series 3 in 2011, the car received LPG compatibility, updated driver interface technology and several interior alterations, including a standard touchscreen and leather trim.

The Clubsport lineup included variants such as the R8 Tourer (station wagon), the CSV CR8 for export to the Middle East, and the Vauxhall VXR8 for the United Kingdom. The W427, a limited-edition model, was equipped with a 7.0-litre LS7 V8 engine, producing 375 kW (503 hp) and 640 N⋅m (472 lb⋅ft) of torque, making it the most powerful vehicle in the E Series lineup.

== Production ==
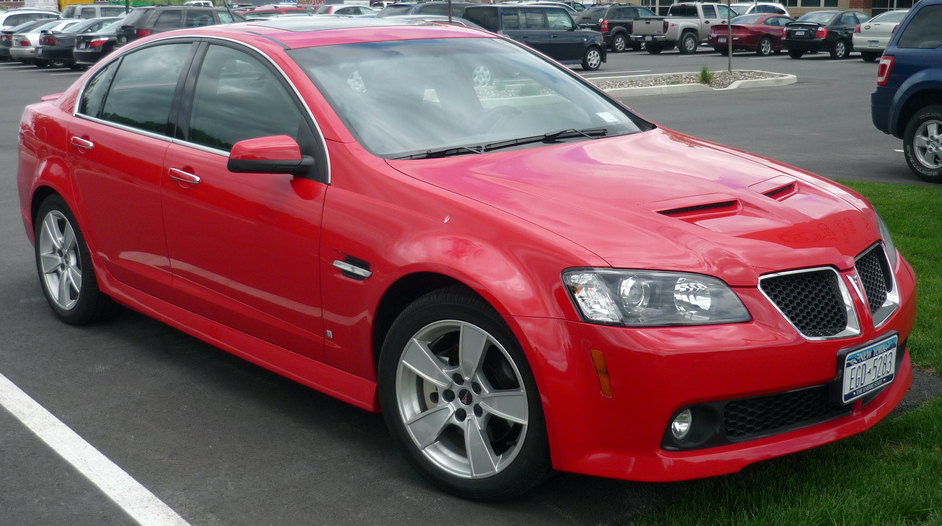
VE Commodores were exported to North America from 2007 to 2009 as the Pontiac G8. However, the front bumper, hood and grille were modified to integrate with Pontiac's own design language.

At the time of its launch in Australia, Ford's BF Falcon was a direct competitor of the VE Commodore. In late 2005 the front-wheel drive Mitsubishi 380 was launched to indirectly compete with the Commodore, but was discontinued with the 2008 closure of the Mitsubishi Motors Australia plant in Tonsley Park, South Australia. In November 2006 Toyota released their Aurion model to the Australian market.

The VE Commodore was well received in the Australian market, outselling its competitors in the large-car segment. Its position as Australia's outright best-selling car was challenged in 2007 and overtaken in some months in 2008 by the Toyota Corolla in the face of increasing petrol prices. Nevertheless, the introduction of the Sportwagon in mid-2008 contributed to the VE Commodore regaining its top sales position, accounting for over 30 per cent of total Commodore sales. In 2007 the VE series became the fifth Commodore model to receive the Wheels Car of the Year award.

Beginning in September 2006, the VE range was exported to New Zealand; in the Middle East and South Africa it was re-branded as the Chevrolet Lumina. Sales of the Berlina began in 2007 in the Brazilian market under the Chevrolet Omega name. In North America, between 2008 and 2009, Pontiac also imported Commodore sedans as the G8. The discontinuation of the G8 followed GM's Chapter 11 bankruptcy, leading to the discontinuation of the Pontiac brand. The Pontiac G8 received several unique features, including a revised L76 engine with Active Fuel Management, and appearance changes to conform to Pontiac's own design language. In 2009, the small-scale German manufacturer Bitter, known for rebodying existing vehicles, introduced its "Vero Sport" at the Geneva Motor Show. It was based on the Commodore SS.

The final VE Commodore was produced on 17 May 2013; it was an automatic SS V sedan painted in Chlorophyll green and intended for a dealer in the Northern Territory. Between 2006 and 2013, Holden manufactured over 520,000 units of the VE Commodore, of which 350,000 were sold in Australia. It was succeeded by the VF Commodore.

== Bibliography ==
- Butler, Glenn; Dowling, Joshua; Hagon, Toby; Newton, Bruce (2006). "VE Commodore eMag" (PDF). Drive. Archived from the original (PDF) on 14 March 2007.
- McCarthy, Mike; McKay, Peter; Newton, Bruce; Robinson, Peter (2006). "2006 Collector's Edition VE Commodore: The Full Story". Wheels.
- Robinson, Peter (2006). AutoBiography: The Inside Story of Holden's All-New VE Commodore. Focus Publishing. ISBN 1-921156-10-4.
