= DEQX =

DEQX (Digital Equalization and Crossover) is an Australian-based company that develops digital loudspeaker and room correction technology.

The company was founded by Kim Ryrie, who also founded the music technology company Fairlight.

DEQX processors correct loudspeaker distortion and also apply room compensation as required. DEQX equipment is used by Jeff Rowland Design Group in the USA and Abbey Road Mastering Studios in the UK.
