= Peter Vogel (computer designer) =

Australian inventor and technologist (born 1954)

- Born: 30 August 1954 (age 72); Sydney, New South Wales, Australia
- Education: Cranbrook School, Sydney
- Occupations: Inventor, technologist
- Known for: Development of the Fairlight CMI

Peter Vogel (born 30 August 1954) is an Australian inventor and technologist known for developing the Fairlight CMI.

== Career ==
Vogel has worked in the electronics industry since graduating from Cranbrook School, Sydney in 1972. His first major achievement was the development of the world's first commercial sound sampling electronic musical instrument, the Fairlight CMI. Along with his school friend Kim Ryrie, Vogel was co-founder of Fairlight, the company that made the CMI from 1975 to 1999. Along with Tony Furse of Creative Strategies, the two were awarded the CSIRO Medal in 1987.

In 1982, he designed a medical emergency response device called Vitalcall. As of 2014, he returned to this field as chief technology officer of Vitalcare, an Australian medical alarm service for the aged.

In 1988 Vogel started Right Hemisphere Pty Ltd. This took him from the field of sound and vision processing to the wider realm of computers and communications.

Around the time of starting Right Hemisphere, Vogel filed a number of patents for inventions in the television field, including an on-screen program guide. His inventions included a device for removing commercials from TV recordings, which decades later brought him into conflict with certain television broadcasters.

In 2003, Vogel closed down Right Hemisphere to concentrate on developing IceTV. IceTV provided Australia's first subscription-based electronic program guide for television, offering a TiVo-like service including the ability to remotely instruct digital video recorders to record content using mobile phones and web browsers.

In 2006, IceTV was sued by the Nine Network, which alleged that IceTV's electronic program guide (EPG) breached their copyright. The financial damage caused by the lawsuit resulted in Vogel losing his job as Chief Technical Officer of IceTV. He left IceTV in October 2006, and with three other professionals with expertise in technology, media and commerce, started a new consultancy, Vogel Ross Pty Limited.

The Nine Network vs IceTV case was heard before the High Court of Australia, which in 2009 ruled in IceTV's favour. The decision was described in some legal circles as a significant landmark in Australian copyright law.

After re-establishing Fairlight Instruments in August 2009 and releasing the CMI-30A, the 30th anniversary model of the Fairlight CMI, and Fairlight iOS apps for the Apple iPhone and iPad, Vogel renamed Fairlight Instruments to Peter Vogel Instruments in July 2012. When announcing the name change, the company indicated a new range of synthesisers was being developed.

As of 2017, however, visitors to the Vogel website are greeted with an advisory that the new CMI is currently not for sale due to litigation from the former owners of the Fairlight trademark, Fairlight.au Pty Ltd. Peter Vogel Instruments had contracted Fairlight.au to develop the software for the CMI-30A and licensed the Fairlight trademark. In 2012, Fairlight.au sued Peter Vogel Instruments in the Federal Court of Australia, claiming that PVI had infringed Fairlight.au's trademark because the licence only allowed the trademark to be used for the CMI-30A hardware, not for the iOS app. Peter Vogel Instruments cross-claimed against Fairlight.au for breach of contract and copyright infringement.

The dispute was finalised on appeal to the Federal Court of Australia in 2016. Fairlight.au was subsequently ordered to pay PVI damages and as at September 2019 this award is subject to appeal.
