= Wheels (magazine) =

Australian automotive magazine

- Cover of April 2010 issue
- Editor: Matthew O'Malley
- Categories: Automobile magazine
- Frequency: Monthly
- Publisher: Motoring Media Network
- Founder: Athol Yeomans
- Founded: 1953
- First issue: May 1953
- Company: Motoring Media Network
- Country: Australia
- Based in: Sydney
- Language: English
- Website: www.whichcar.com.au/wheels
- ISSN: 0043-4779

Wheels is an Australian automobile magazine published monthly since 1953. It was founded by Hudson Publications, and was later owned by Australian Consolidated Press, Bauer Media, and Are Media. Motoring Media Network acquired the magazine in July 2024.

== History ==
Wheels was founded in 1953 by Hudson Publications with Athol Yeomans as its founding editor. The following year, Colin Ryrie and Jules Feldman left the outlet to build rival magazine Modern Motor. In June 1955 the publication was sold to K.G. Murray Publishing. Yeomans resigned as editor in 1956.

Since 1963, Wheels has annually announced its Car of the Year award – although this was withheld in 1972, 1979 and 1986. The award was established during the editorship of Bill Tuckey. Tuckey also instigated comparisons tests within the title.

In 1973, the magazine's owner Murray Publishing was purchased by Australian Consolidated Press (ACP).

It was announced in September 2010 that Bill Thomas, former deputy editor of Top Gear magazine in the UK, would take over as editor in November 2010.

In September 2012, Wheels was included in the acquisition of Australian Consolidated Press's magazines by Bauer Media.

October 2012 brought the announcement that former Top Gear Australia magazine editor Stephen Corby was to become editor of Wheels, replacing Bill Thomas.

For the October 2013 issue, Ben Oliver drove a Volvo S60 from Melbourne to Sydney along the Hume Highway, and Wheels launched the "Raise the limit, lower the toll" petition to raise the speed limit to 130km/h, as it is in the Northern Territory. The stunt received criticism from law enforcement agencies.

Glenn Butler was the publication’s editor from 2014 through 2016.

In March 2017, Butler was replaced by deputy editor Alex Inwood.

In the February 2018 issue, the magazine was redesigned with new fonts, thicker paper, a cleaner style and appearance and a greater emphasis on hero photography.

In 2020, Wheels was included in the acquisition of Bauer Media's Australian assets by Are Media.

From November 2020, it was confirmed that former Motor editor Dylan Campbell would serve as the new Wheels editor.

June 2022 saw another change at the helm, with the shuttering of Motor magazine leading to its editor Andy Enright taking over as editor of Wheels magazine.

From June 2023, Wheels magazine celebrated its 70th anniversary with a trilogy of monthly issues themed around Past, Present and Future.

According to Roy Morgan, Wheels magazine's 70th year saw an increase in circulation of 40.8% to reach 290,000 readers.

In 2023, Wheels won Brand Relaunch of the Year at the Mumbrella Publish Awards.

Wheels was acquired by Motoring Media Network in July 2024.

In May 2025, Wheels appointed new editor, Trent Nikolic. (No citation available, but May 2025 is the earliest online article with Nikolic's byline.)

== Editors ==
- 1953-56 Athol Yeomans
- 1956-58 Ian Simpson
- 1958-63 Ian Fraser
- 1963-68 Bill Tuckey
- 1968-71 Rob Luck
- 1971-87 Peter Robinson
- 1987-94 Phil Scott
- 1994-99 Angus MacKenzie
- 1999-02 Ewen Page
- 2002-10 Ged Bulmer
- 2011-12 Bill Thomas
- 2012-13 Stephen Corby
- 2014-17 Glenn Butler
- 2017-20 Alex Inwood
- 2020-21 Dylan Campbell
- 2021-22 Ash Westerman (acting)
- 2022-25 Andy Enright
- 2025-25 Matthew O'Malley (acting)
- 2025-26 Trent Nikolic
- 2026- Rob Margeit
