= Wheels Car of the Year =

Automotive award

Wheels Car of the Year (commonly abbreviated to COTY) is an annual automotive Car of the Year award presented by Wheels magazine. The publisher claims that it is the world's oldest continuous motoring award of its kind. The award is given to the best newly released vehicle each year.

== History ==
Since 1963, Wheels has awarded the title of Car of the Year. In its inaugural year, the French Renault 8 became the inaugural COTY winner, which was built in many countries including Australia.

The original intention of COTY was to promote excellence in the Australian car manufacturing industry, dominated at the time by Ford, Holden, Chrysler, Datsun and Toyota. With the fuel crisis in the 1970s, European makers also based in Australia, such as Renault and Volkswagen, began closing their local assembly plants. With a shrinking local manufacturing base and reliability and quality issues that affected Australian-made cars, Wheels changed the basis of the award to include imported cars. At first, this was condemned by the local industry, unions and media, however, the approach permitted local products to be judged on a global basis. This, in turn, is claimed to have contributed towards a more competitive local industry and sees each winner heavily advertised as a COTY winner.

The award is given on an annual basis, except in 1972, 1979 and 1986 when, under the stewardship of the then-editor Peter Robinson, no newly released car in those years was considered worthy of the award.

The withholding of the award in 1972 and 1979 twice coincided with the release of a new Ford Falcon (the XA and XD series). On the second occasion, as the Falcon (XD) was a sales success and leading candidate for the 1980 COTY award, the then deputy manager of Ford Australia, Edsel Ford II, took out a 1-page advertisement in Wheels magazine, depicting the Falcon and other contenders as lemons and stating "There are times when being a lemon is not a bitter experience at all". This was both in answer to the award's withdrawal against the Falcon and Wheels' cover for March 1980, which was a four-wheeled lemon under the title "NO CAR OF THE YEAR".

The first imported car to win the award was the Japanese Honda Accord for 1977. In 1982, the award was shared for the first time between badge engineered cars and, in 1991, between completely different types of cars. Over the years, the COTY criteria has been further refined and, for 2004, it was amended to allow any Sport Utility Vehicle (SUV) to be eligible for the first time, permitting the Australian-made Ford Territory to take the title. For 2011, the Honda CR-Z instead became the first hybrid to win the award.

Starting from 2015, the temporal basis of how the award is branded has been changed such that, the award now carries the year of when the winner was announced, instead of the preceding year when testing took place. Consequently, what would have been the 2015 COTY winner is instead be the winner for 2016 and so forth.

== COTY winners ==
To date, in chronological order, the award winners (by name including series where available) have been the following:

- 1963 Renault 8
- 1964 Morris 1100
- 1965 Ford XP Falcon
- 1966 Ford XR Falcon (Note: First manufacturer to win consecutively)
- 1967 Chrysler VE Valiant
- 1968 Holden HK Monaro (Note: First coupé winner)
- 1969 Holden LC Torana
- 1970 Renault 12
- 1971 Chrysler VH Valiant Charger
- 1972 – award withheld
- 1973 Leyland P76 V8 (Note: First model-specific award (V8 engined range only))
- 1974 Volkswagen Passat (B1)
- 1975 Holden TX Gemini
- 1976 Volkswagen Golf Mk1
- 1977 Honda Accord (Note: First fully imported winner)
- 1978 Holden VB Commodore
- 1979 – award withheld
- 1980 Mazda 323 (BD)
- 1981 Mercedes-Benz S-Class (W126) (Note: First luxury winner)
- 1982 Holden JB Camira
- 1983 Mazda 626 (GC) and Ford AR Telstar (Note: Awards shared between badge engineered models)
- 1984 Mitsubishi Nimbus (Note: First multi-purpose vehicle (MPV) winner)
- 1985 Mitsubishi TM Magna
- 1986 – award withheld
- 1987 Honda Prelude
- 1988 Holden VN Commodore
- 1989 Mazda MX-5 (NA) (Note: First convertible winner)
- 1990 Lexus LS 400 (XF10)
- 1991 Honda NSX and Nissan Pulsar (N14) (Note: Award shared between different types of vehicles)
- 1992 Mazda 626 (GE) and Ford AX Telstar
- 1993 Holden VR Commodore
- 1994 Subaru Liberty
- 1995 Honda Odyssey
- 1996 Mitsubishi TE Magna/KE Verada
- 1997 Holden VT Commodore
- 1998 Subaru Liberty
- 1999 Mercedes-Benz S-Class (W220)
- 2000 Subaru Impreza
- 2001 Holden XC Barina
- 2002 Ford BA Falcon
- 2003 Mazda RX-8 (Note: First rotary engined winner)
- 2004 Ford SX Territory (Note: First sport utility vehicle (SUV) winner)
- 2005 Mazda MX-5 (NC)
- 2006 Holden VE Calais (Note: Last Australian-made vehicle to win COTY)
- 2007 Mercedes-Benz C-Class (W204)
- 2008 Honda Accord Euro
- 2009 Volkswagen Golf Mk6
- 2010 Volkswagen Polo Mk5
- 2011 Honda CR-Z (Note: First hybrid vehicle winner)
- 2012 Toyota 86 and Subaru BRZ
- 2013 Volkswagen Golf Mk7
- 2014 BMW i3
- 2015 – temporal basis for award changed
- 2016 Mazda MX-5 (ND)
- 2017 Mazda CX-9 (TC)
- 2018 Volvo XC60
- 2019 Volvo XC40
- 2020 Mercedes-Benz EQC
- 2021 Mazda CX-30
- 2022 Kia EV6
- 2023 Ford Everest (Note: First body-on-frame winner)
- 2024 Hyundai Ioniq 5 N
- 2025 Honda Civic e:HEV L

== Multiple wins ==
=== Most awarded vehicles ===
No.	Models
5	Holden Commodore
3	Ford Falcon, Mazda MX-5, Volkswagen Golf
2	Chrysler Valiant, Honda Accord, Mercedes-Benz S-Class^{†}, Mitsubishi Magna

=== Multiple awards by manufacturer ===
No.	Manufacturer	Models
10	Holden	Commodore (5), Barina (1), Camira (1), Gemini (1), Monaro (1), Torana (1)
9	Mazda	MX-5 (3), 626 (2), 323 (1), RX-8 (1), CX-9 (1), CX-30 (1)
7	Ford	Falcon (3), Telstar (2), Territory (1), Everest (1)
6	Honda	Accord (2), CR-Z (1), NSX (1), Prelude (1), Odyssey (1)
5	Volkswagen	Golf (3), Passat (1), Polo (1)
4	Subaru	Liberty (2), BRZ (1), Impreza (1)
4	Mercedes-Benz	S-Class^{†} (2), C-Class (1), EQC (1)
3	Mitsubishi	Magna (2), Nimbus (1)
2	Chrysler	Valiant (2)
2	Renault	8 (1), 12 (1)
2	Volvo	XC60 (1), XC40 (1)

^{†} Includes award won by the S-Class predecessor—the Mercedes-Benz 380 SE (W126).

== See also ==
- List of motor vehicle awards
