= Kim Ryrie =

Kim Ryrie is an Australian synthesiser inventor who founded the audio technology company Fairlight with Peter Vogel.

== Career ==
Kim Ryrie was the son of magazine publisher, Colin Ryrie, of Modern Magazines Pty Ltd. Based in Sydney, Ryrie launched the magazine Electronics Today International in 1970 where readers would build the ETI 4600 analogue synthesiser by adding to it with pieces in each issue month by month. In 1975 he discussed the limitations of analogue synthesisers with his schoolfriend, electronics designer, Peter Vogel and they invented the Fairlight CMI (Computer Musical Instrument). Launched in 1979, the CMI synthesiser became popular in the 1980s with musicians such as Stevie Wonder, and the two founders received a CSIRO medal for their innovation.

As other companies entered the market and introduced low-cost alternatives Fairlight went bankrupt. Ryrie purchased the companies patents and set up a new company called Fairlight ESP (Electric Sound and Picture), which sold digital audio workstations to Hollywood film studios, and won an Academy Award in 2001.

In 1997 he started DEQX, which stands for digital equalisation crossover, and began working on improving speaker technology. The first commercial DEQX product was released in 2007 and was used by Abbey Road Studios in London.
