= Fairlight (company) =

Australian digital audio company

- Fairlight logo, c. 2010s
- Type: Subsidiary
- Industry: Audio technology, digital audio workstation design, digital sampling instruments
- Predecessors: Fairlight Instruments Pty Ltd
- Founded: 1975
- Founder: Peter Vogel, Kim Ryrie
- Successors: Fairlight Audio Pty Ltd
- Headquarters: Port Melbourne, Victoria, Australia
- Area served: Worldwide
- Key people: Peter Vogel, Kim Ryrie, Tony Furse
- Products: Fairlight CMI, Fairlight MFX, Fairlight Dream, Fairlight DAW
- Owner: Blackmagic Design (since 2016)
- Parent: Blackmagic Design
- Website: blackmagicdesign.com/products/davinciresolve/fairlight

Fairlight is an Australian company specialising in professional digital audio systems and post-production tools. Founded in 1975 by Peter Vogel and Kim Ryrie, the company originated in Sydney, New South Wales. In 1979, it introduced the Series I Fairlight CMI, one of the earliest digital audio workstations (DAWs) to integrate a digital audio sampler. Subsequent models, including the Series II and III, featured a graphic music sequencer called Page R, released at a time when most computer-based sequencers required programming skills.

Fairlight's instruments were used by prominent artists such as Peter Gabriel, Kate Bush and Jean-Michel Jarre. The brand became emblematic of 1980s pop and electronic music culture, to the point where Phil Collins famously included the note “there is no Fairlight on this record” in the liner notes of No Jacket Required.

The last hardware developed under the Fairlight brand included the Xynergi Media Production Centre and its modular Dream II and Constellation systems, powered by the company's Crystal Core (CC-1 and later CC-2) audio engines. These consoles marked the culmination of Fairlight’s integrated digital audio and mixing technology before the company was acquired by Blackmagic Design in 2016. Following the acquisition, Blackmagic introduced a new range of Fairlight-branded consoles and desktop audio editors. Continuing the brand’s legacy within modern post-production workflows, Blackmagic integrated Fairlight software into its DaVinci Resolve non-linear editing system.

== History ==
In 1975, Fairlight Instruments Pty Ltd was established by Peter Vogel and Kim Ryrie. The company produced microprocessor-based music workstations with samplers, which were revolutionary for their time.

New sounds could be created by drawing a 'sound wave' on the screen, which the computer would produce as sound. Theoretically, any sound was possible. Apart from opening up a world of new sounds, the Fairlight gave composers and performers instant playback. By changing the wave patterns presented on a screen, they could tweak a sound into shape without singing or performing it all over again.

The versatility of the early Fairlight was not lost on recording artists. The first record made entirely on a computer in the United States was done by EBN-OZN (Ned Liben, who represented Fairlight in New York, and Robert Ozn) – "AEIOU Sometimes Y" made in 1981, released in 1983.

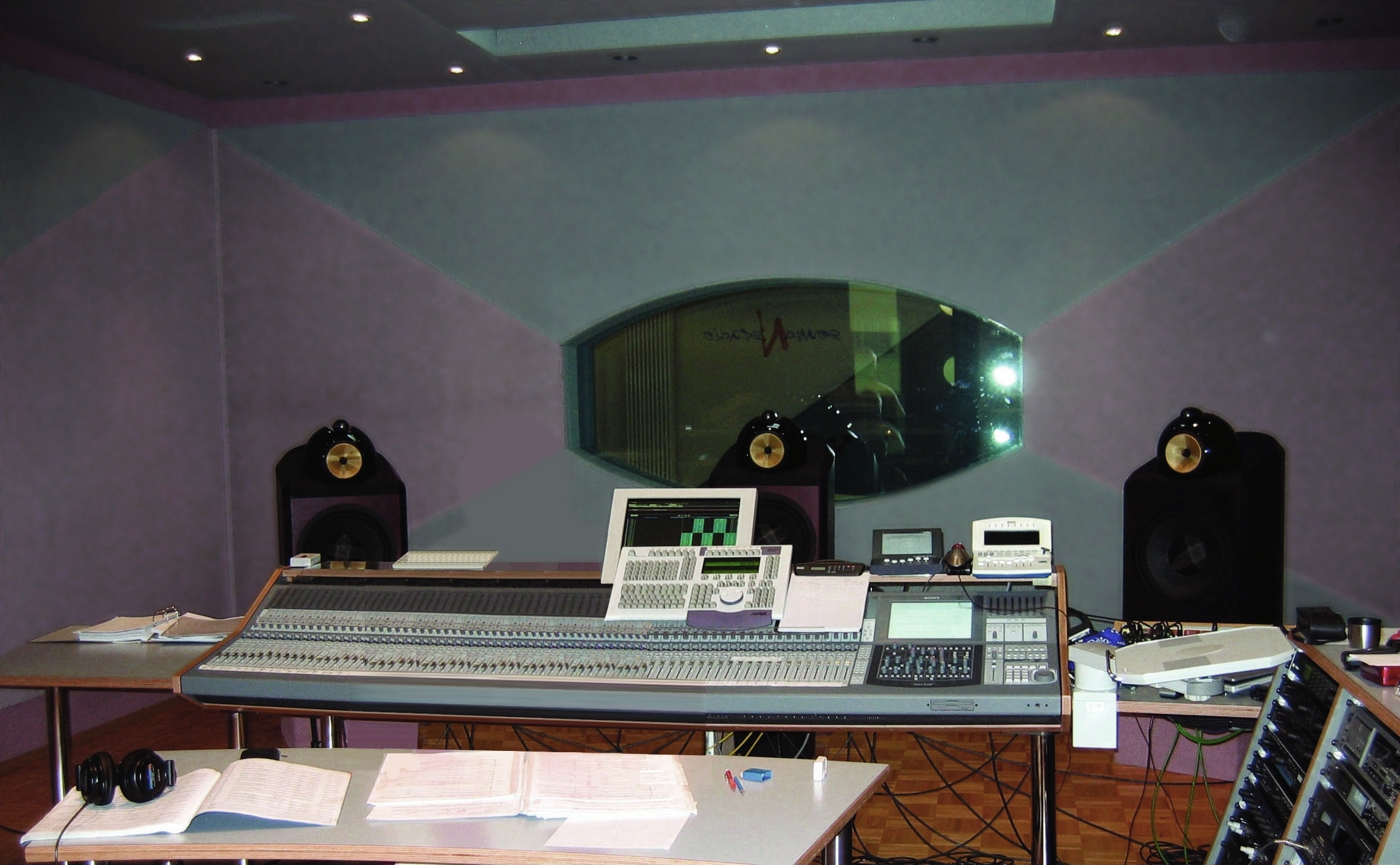
Fairlight digital audio recorder on Sony Oxford console, used for the mixdown by Karlheinz Stockhausen (Sound Studio N, Cologne, 2014-03-07)

Fairlight also became a manufacturer of media tools such as digital audio recording and mixing consoles. A hybrid analogue/digital Computer Video Instrument, invented by Kia Silverbrook, debuted in 1984. The fact that the CVI was also a "computer" was transparent to its use: it did not use a conventional ASCII keyboard (though in later models one could be attached), but rather a set of sliders and a small graphics pad about the size of the palm of a hand. Menu selections were made with a stylus rather than a mouse. The CVI allowed users to paint directly over the top of video footage as well as "with" video footage via an extensive series of effects.

In April 1989, Fairlight ESP (Electric Sound and Picture) was established by Kim Ryrie, with the financial backing of Australian distributor Amber.

=== DaVinci Resolve ===
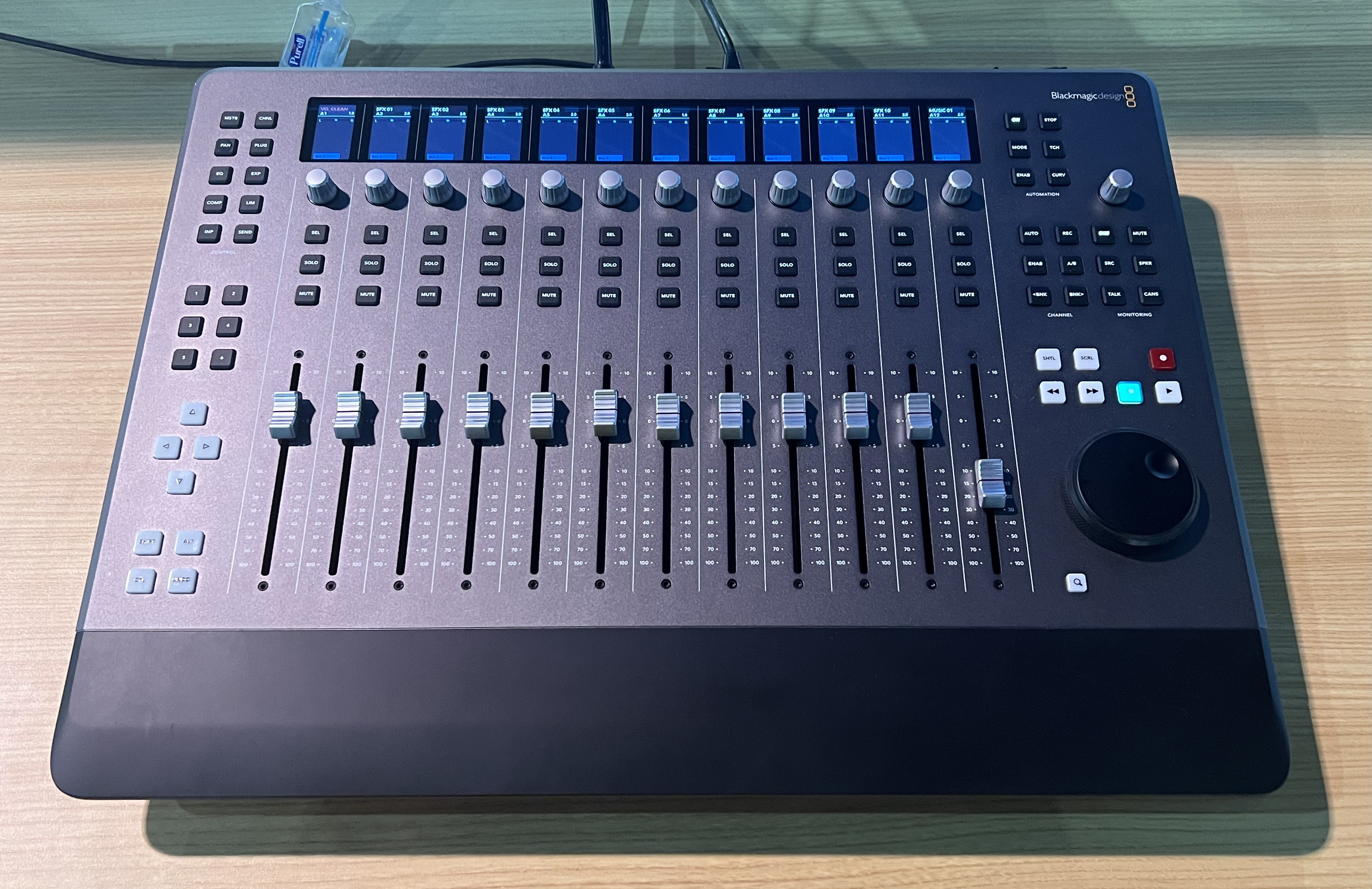
Blackmagic Design Fairlight Desktop Console (2020)

In September 2016, Fairlight was acquired by Blackmagic Design.

Since version 14 (2017), DaVinci Resolve has included an integrated version of Fairlight software designed for TV and film post-production, and live audio mixing. The Resolve-integrated software supports up to 1000 audio tracks, with a maximum of 6 inserts and 24 aux-sends per track. Other functionality includes 96-channel audio recording and 3D audio mixing for formats such as 5.1, 7.1 and 22.2. Integrated audio tools include compression/expansion, limiting, gating and parametric EQ.

Fairlight software has been used in the production of TV shows, advertisements, and feature films such as Logan and Murder on the Orient Express.

== Products ==
- Fairlight CMI music sampler (mid 1970s)
- MFX digital audio workstation with dedicated audio control surface
  - MFX1 (1990 – 1991)
  - MFX2 (1992 – 1994)
  - MFX3 (1994 – 1996)
  - MFX3+ (1996 – 2000)
- Dream Constellation digital audio workstation with integrated audio control surface and mixing console (2004)
- Crystal Core processing engine – a sound processing device capable of sampling frequencies up to 384 kHz. Crystal Core does not use DSP-based architecture, but a Field Programmable Gate Array. (CC-1 see Dream software below, CC-2 released 2014)
- Dream II software (ran with Crystal Core engine) (released 2008)
- Xynergi – a tactile control unit that makes use of self-labeling LCD keys. (2008)
- Quantum digital audio workstation, audio control surface and mixing console (2012)
- Quantum Live sound mixing console (2014)

== Peter Vogel Instruments ==
In August 2009, a new company called Fairlight Instruments was launched by Peter Vogel to produce a new range of computer musical instruments (CMI) based on Fairlight.au's "Crystal Core" media engine.

In July 2012, the company Fairlight Instruments changed its name to Peter Vogel Instruments. Peter Vogel announced the company was developing a completely new keyboard synthesizer, which would be launched at Winter NAMM 2013. The name change was the result of a disagreement between the owners of the Fairlight Instruments trademark and him that resulted in Fairlight revoking his license to use the name. According to them, the use of the Fairlight name only extended to the new version of the CMI, called the CMI-30A in reference to the instrument's 30th anniversary. Additionally, it extended to several other CMI hardware products planned, including a PC-based "Series IV." They claimed that because Vogel had also used the Fairlight name for the iOS CMI app as well, he had violated the terms of the agreement, and they were within their rights to terminate the agreement. Vogel said that he believed that the licensing agreement also extended to the app as well, but the Federal Court held the agreement had been validly terminated.

Vogel appealed to a full court of the Federal Court however the appeal was only partially successful, and Fairlight was required to pay 50% of Vogel's costs for the appeal.

The iOS app was temporarily withdrawn from the App Store but subsequently returned. The CMI-30A, however, has remained out of production, and visitors to the Vogel Instruments website are greeted with a notification that sales of the CMI-30A have been suspended pending the resolution of litigation with Fairlight.
