= Colin Ryrie =

Australian sailor

Colin Stirling Ryrie (23 December 1929 – 7 July 1972) was an Australian Olympic sailor and magazine publisher. He competed in the Finn class at the 1956 and 1964 Summer Olympic games.

In the early 1950s, Ryrie worked in advertising at Hudson Publications. In 1954, he and Jules Feldman left the company and formed Modern Magazines Pty Ltd and launched Modern Motor. Other titles followed in 1965, including Modern Boating, Hi-Fi Review, Rugby League Week and Electronics Today International. A son, Kim Ryrie, co-designed the Fairlight CMI.

He was later commodore of the Royal Prince Edward Yacht Club in Sydney. He died in July 1972 after a boating accident late at night in Sydney Harbour.
