= Motor (Australian magazine) =

Australian automobile magazine

- Categories: Automobile magazine
- Frequency: Monthly
- First issue: May 1954
- Final issue: July 2022
- Company: Are Media
- Country: Australia
- Language: English
- Website: www.whichcar.com.au

Motor was an Australian automobile magazine published monthly by Are Media. Motor was Australia's leading performance car publication, with two major awards for automotive manufacturers: Performance Car of the Year and Sports Car of the Year.

== History and profile ==
Motor magazine was originally published as Modern Motor from its inaugural issue on 9 May 1954 by the Colin Ryrie as MD of Modern Magazines and Jules Feldman as editor, who had left Hudson Publications where they worked at Wheels. The name derived from the publishing house that produced it, Modern Magazines. Colloquially, the title was abbreviated to Motor, and subsequently the word 'Modern' was dropped from the title to become simply Motor in 1992. The magazine is headquartered in Melbourne.

Dylan Campbell was the editor between 2013 and 2020. After switching to Wheels in September 2020, Campbell was succeeded as editor by Andy Enright.

As of 2020 Motor was being published by Are Media, the successor to the Bauer Media Australia.

It was announced in April 2022 that the June 2022 issue of Motor will be the magazine's last, ending sixty-eight years of continuous publication.

== Bang For Your Bucks ==
Bang For Your Bucks was an annual award recognising Australia's best value new performance or sports vehicle. It was inaugurated in 1994.

The winner is determined by combining performance data, as gathered on a racetrack, with price to produce a Bang For Your Bucks score.

In 2022, Bang For Your Bucks was replaced by a new competition, Sports Car of the Year, run alongside the existing Performance Car of the Year. The inaugural winner of Sports Car of the Year 2022 was the Subaru BRZ.

== Performance Car of the Year ==
Motor's first Performance Car of the Year was in 1996. Performance Car of the Year recognises the best new performance or sports vehicle released in the preceding 12 months, based on the votes of a judging panel.

Year	Winner
1996	Porsche 911 Turbo (type 993)
1997	BMW E36 M3
1998	Porsche Boxster
1999	Porsche 911 Carrera (type 996)
2000	Porsche Boxster S
2001	Nissan S15 200SX
2002	BMW E46 M3
2003	Porsche Boxster S
2004	Lamborghini Gallardo
2005	Porsche 911 Carrera S (type 997)
2006	Audi B7 RS4
2007	Porsche 911 GT3 (type 997)
2008	Porsche 911 GT2 (type 997)
2009	Audi R8 V10/Nissan GT-R
2010	Porsche 911 GT3 RS (type 997.2)
2011	Nissan GT-R
2012	Porsche 911 Carrera S (type 991)
2013	Audi R8 V10 Plus
2014	Porsche 911 Turbo (type 991)
2015	Porsche 911 GT3 (type 991)
2016	Not run in 2016
2017	Porsche 911 Turbo S (type 991.2)
2018	Honda Civic Type R
2019	Porsche 911 GT2 RS (type 991.2)
2020	Porsche 911 Carrera S (type 992)
2021	Mercedes-AMG GT R Pro
2022	Porsche 911 GT3 (type 992)
