= Holden Barina =

Subcompact car from Holden, 1985–2018

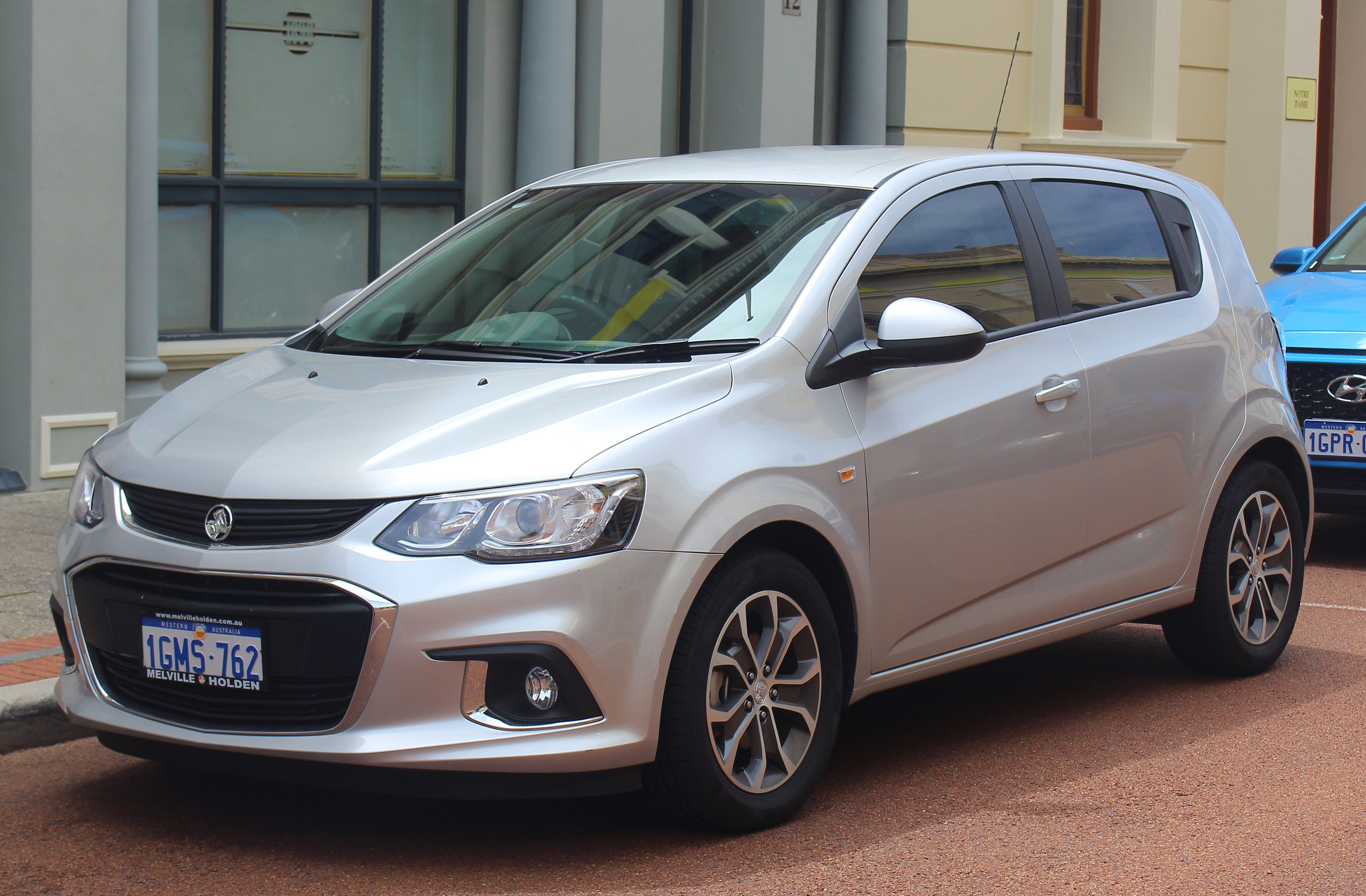

Overview
- Manufacturer: Suzuki (1985–1994); Opel (1994–2005); GM Daewoo (2005–2011); GM Korea (2012–2018)
- Production: 1985–2018
- Assembly: Japan: Hamamatsu (first to second gen.); New Zealand: Trentham (GMNZ: 1985–1989); Spain: Zaragoza (third to fourth gen.); South Korea: Bupyeong (fifth to sixth gen.)

Body and chassis
- Class: Supermini
- Body style: 3/5-door hatchback (1985–2018); 4-door sedan (2006–2018)

The Holden Barina is a subcompact automobile sold between 1985 and 2018 by Holden in Oceania. Each of the six generations have been badge-engineered versions of various General Motors vehicles, namely Suzuki Cultus, Opel Corsa, and Daewoo Kalos. Barina is an Australian aboriginal word meaning "summit".

== First generation (MB, ML; 1985–1988) ==
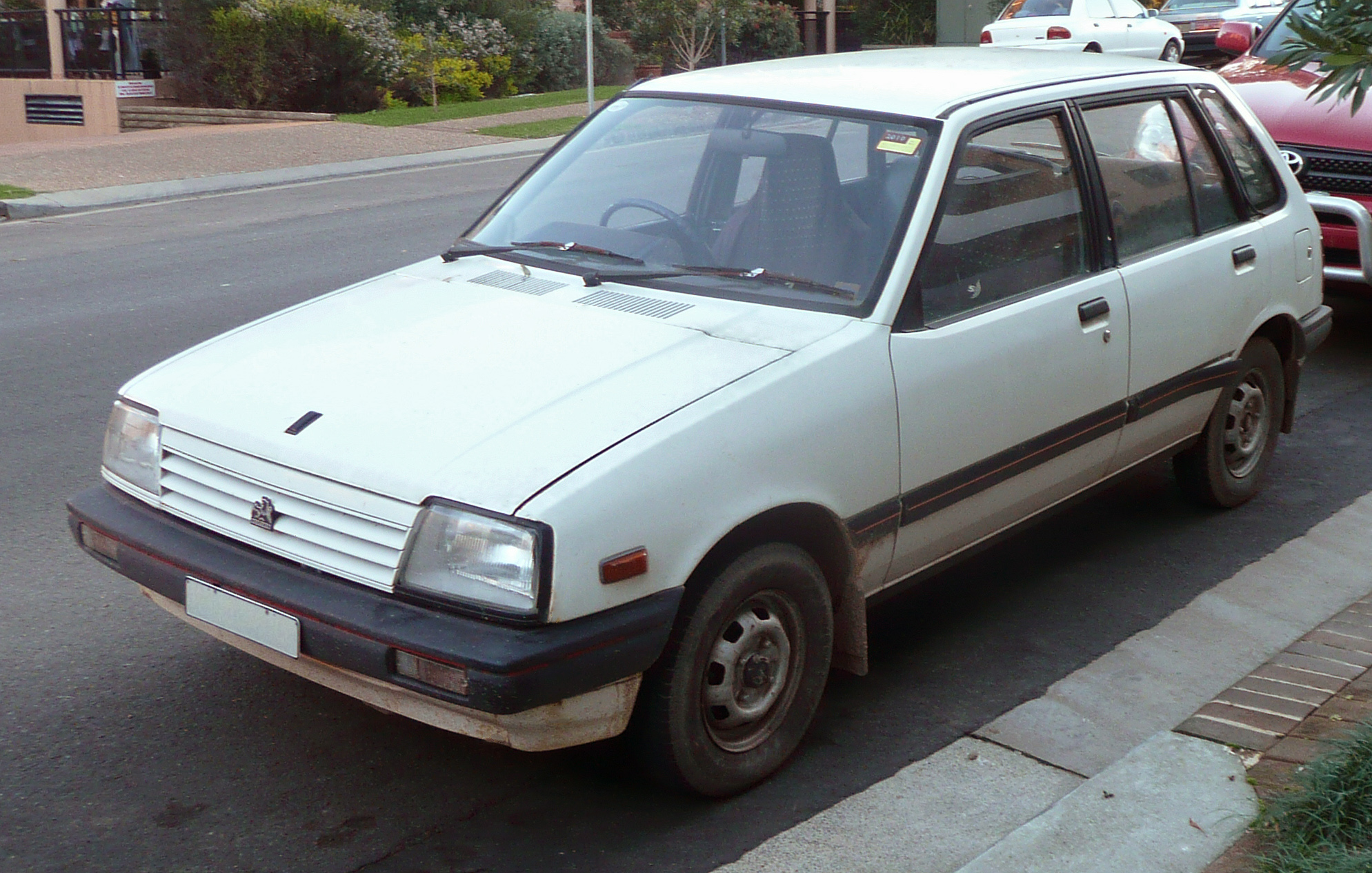

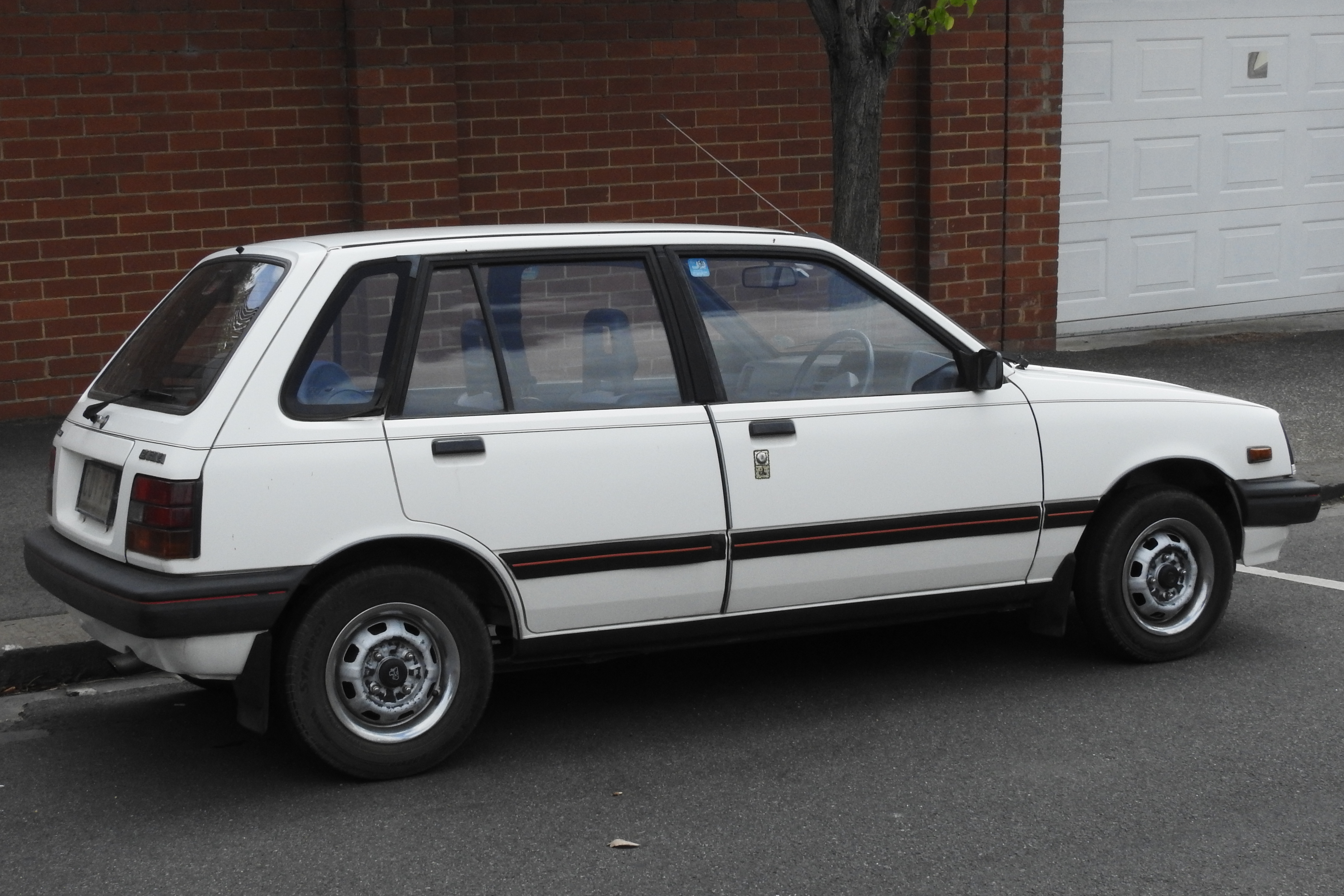
1985 Holden Barina (MB)

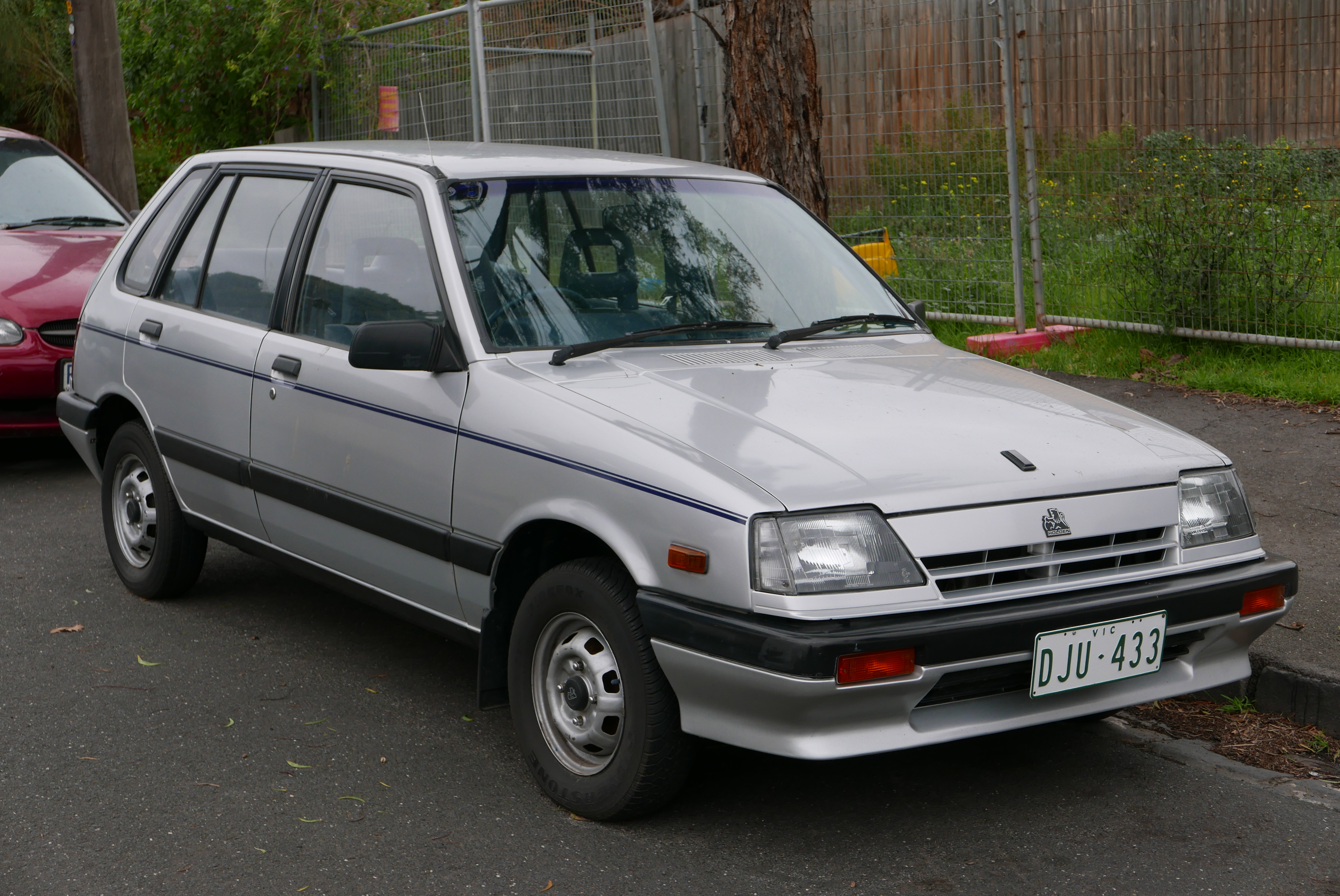

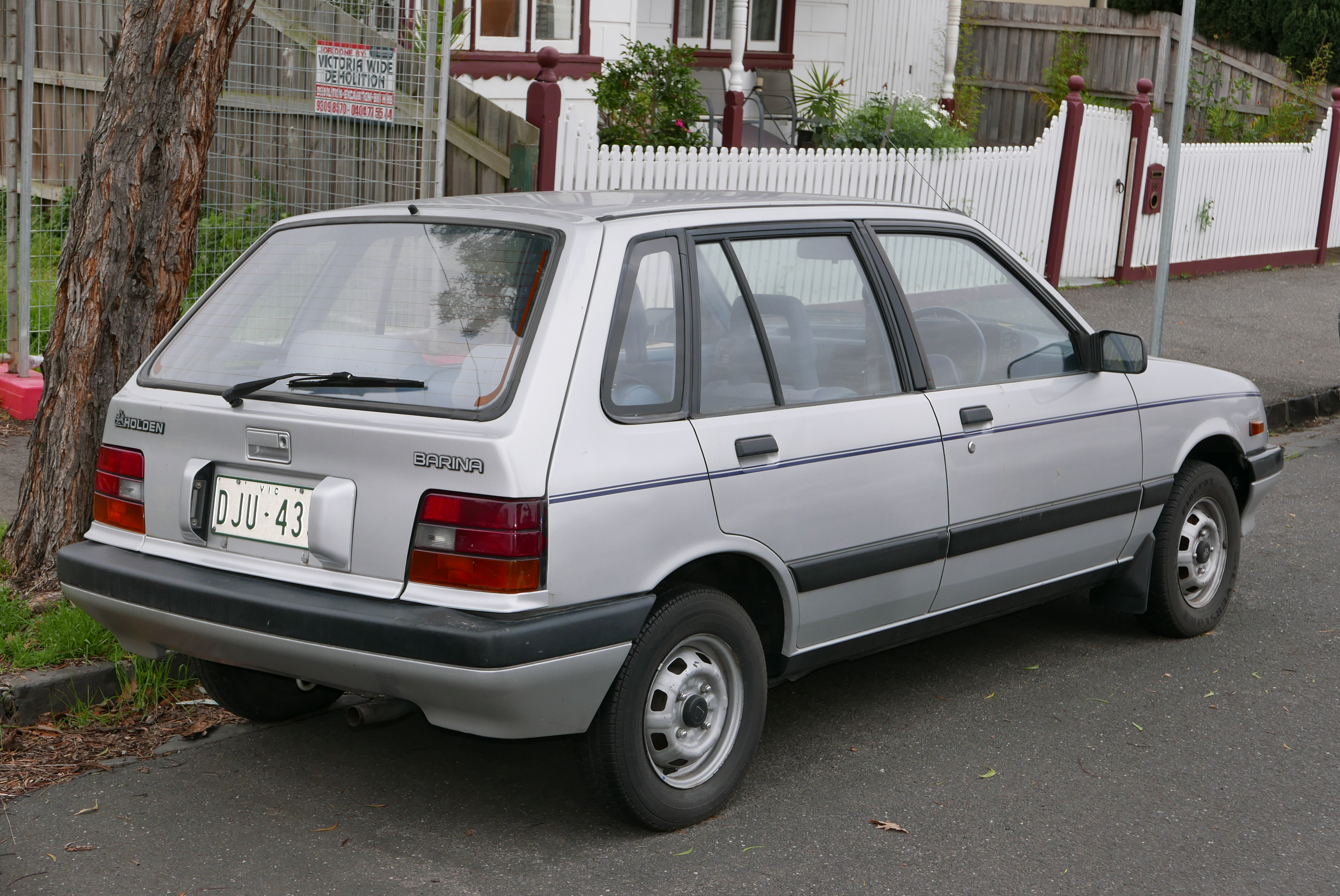
1986–1988 Holden Barina (ML)

The first generation MB Barina was launched on 12 February 1985 as a badge-engineered Suzuki Cultus as a five-door hatchback. In the first year of production a "Roadrunner Pack" special model was offered complete with decals showing the Warner Bros. cartoon character. A high-profile marketing campaign featured the slogan Beep beep Barina, a catchphrase that remains in the consciousness of many Australians in the present. The facelifted ML series was released in September 1986, this included a coil sprung rear end replacing the leaf springs of the MB, a revised dashboard, headlights, tailgate and lights, and front grille.

In the Used Car Safety Ratings undertaken by the Monash University Accident Research Centre, published in 2008, found that the first generation Barina provides a "significantly worse than average" level of occupant safety protection in the event of an accident.

In New Zealand, the Barina (also sold as the "Suzuki Swift") was assembled by GMNZ from 1985 until 1989. At least for the ML series, a three-door version was also offered in NZ. From 1986 to 1989, a Holden Barina GTi model was also sold, being a rebadged Suzuki Swift GTi (see Suzuki Cultus). This vehicle used the G13B engine. General Motors sold this car in other markets as well. In the United States, it was badged as the Chevrolet Sprint.

== Second generation (MF, MH; 1989–1994) ==
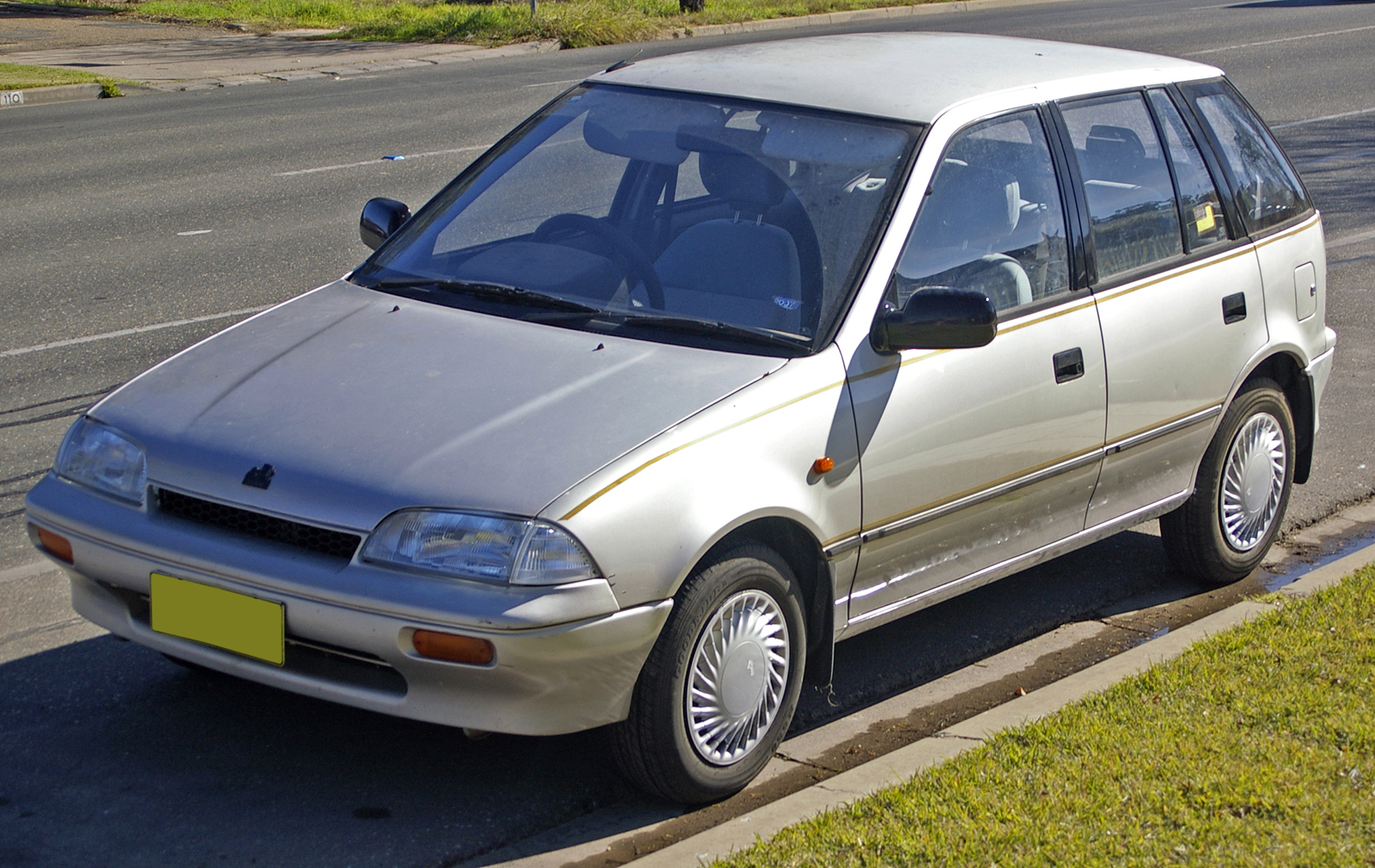

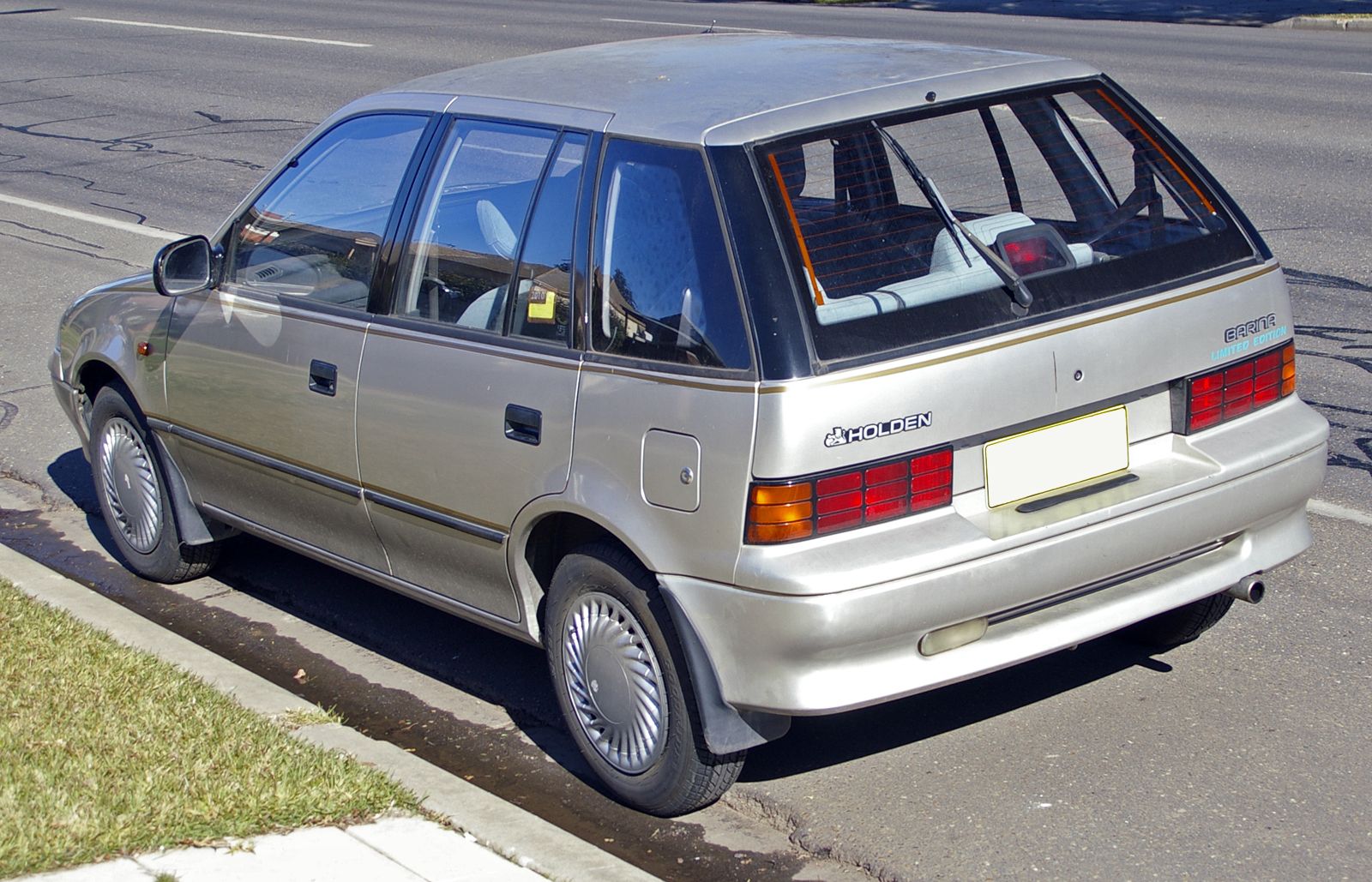
1989–1991 Holden Barina (MF) 5-door hatchback

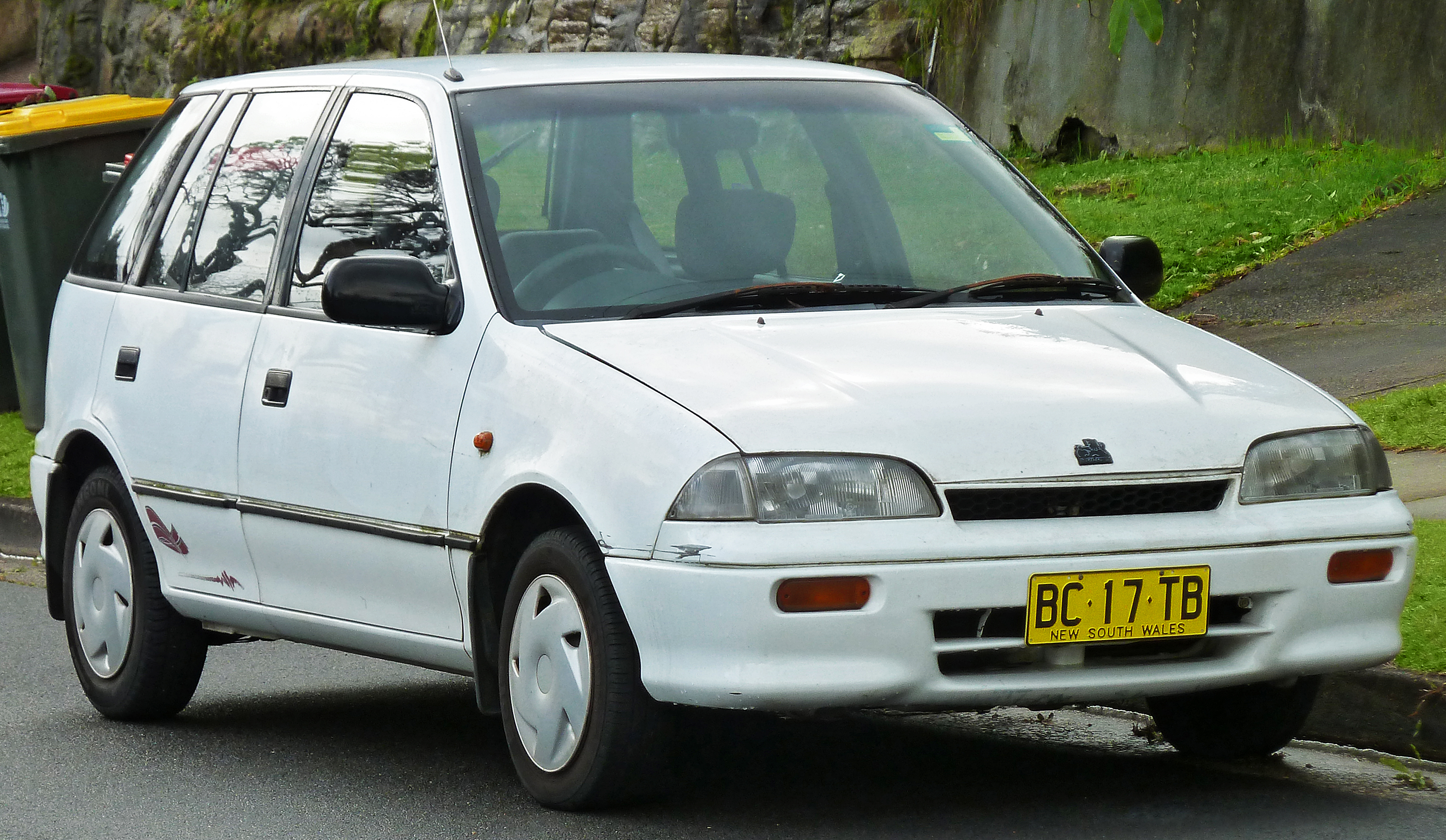

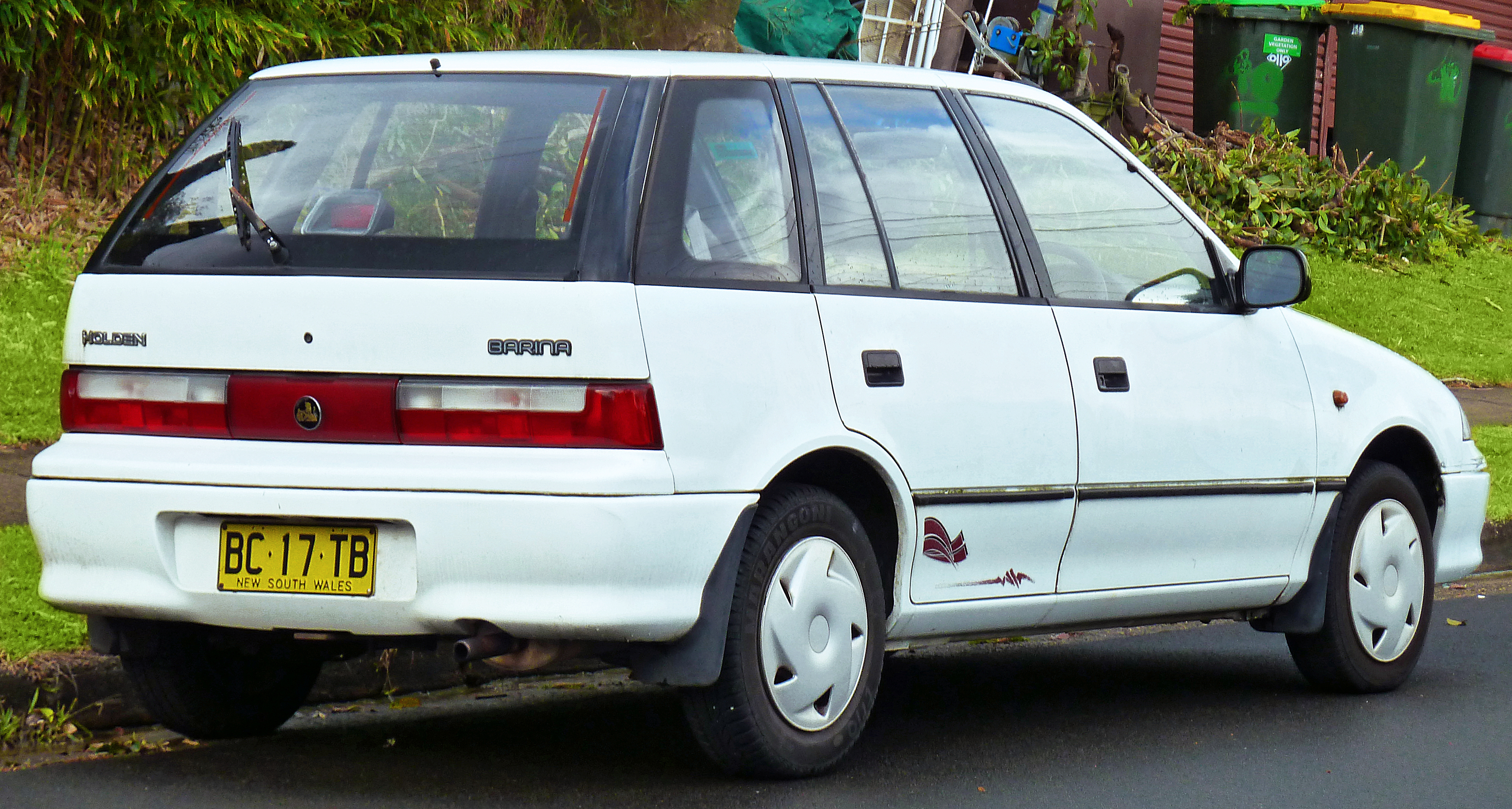
1991–1994 Holden Barina (MH) 5-door hatchback

The second-generation MF Barina was a rebadged second generation Suzuki Cultus, co-developed with GM using the GM M platform and marketed worldwide under nearly a dozen nameplates, prominently as the Suzuki Swift, Pontiac Firefly (Canada) and Geo Metro (Chevrolet's sub-model in the USA). A five-door hatchback was first released in January 1989, and was followed by the introduction of a three-door "GS" hatchback in September 1990.

In the New Zealand market, the Holden Barina was sold mainly on its low price to a different kind of clientele than Suzuki's, often as a second car. It accordingly received lower equipment levels than its Suzuki sibling. An ordering mix-up meant that (right hand drive) NZ versions – now imported assembled from Japan – received the North American Geo tail lamp cluster with red flashing direction indicators rather than the Suzuki style cluster with amber flasher sent to Australia. Luckily for GM NZ, NZ law still allowed amber or red so the red lenses remained for the entire MH series run. The equivalent Suzuki had the amber lenses. The costlier GTi model was reserved for Suzuki for this generation.

The MH Barina, which was released in September 1991, featured an improved interior, upgraded suspension, new front and rear bumpers and revised tail-lamp clusters.

Like the previous generation, the second generation Barina provides a "worse than average" level of safety according to the 2008 Used Car Safety Ratings.

== Third generation (SB; 1994–2000) ==
The third generation SB Barina was based on the Opel Corsa B and imported from Spain. It was released in April 1994 and was offered as a three- or five-door hatchback. Engine choices were a 1.2 and 1.4-litre four-cylinder engine. A 1.6-litre engine was also offered for the sporty range topping GSi. The third generation Barina was available in the following models:

Pre-facelift

- 1.2-litre C12NZ – City 3-door (1994–1997)
- 1.4-litre C14NZ – City 3-door (1996–1997)
- 1.4-litre C14NZ – Joy 3-door (1994–1995)
- 1.4-litre C14NZ – Swing 5-door (1994–1997)
- 1.4-litre C14NZ – Grand Prix 5-door (1996–1997) – special edition
- 1.6-litre C16XE – GSi 3-door (1994–1995)
- 1.6-litre X16XE – GSi 3-door (early 1995–1997)
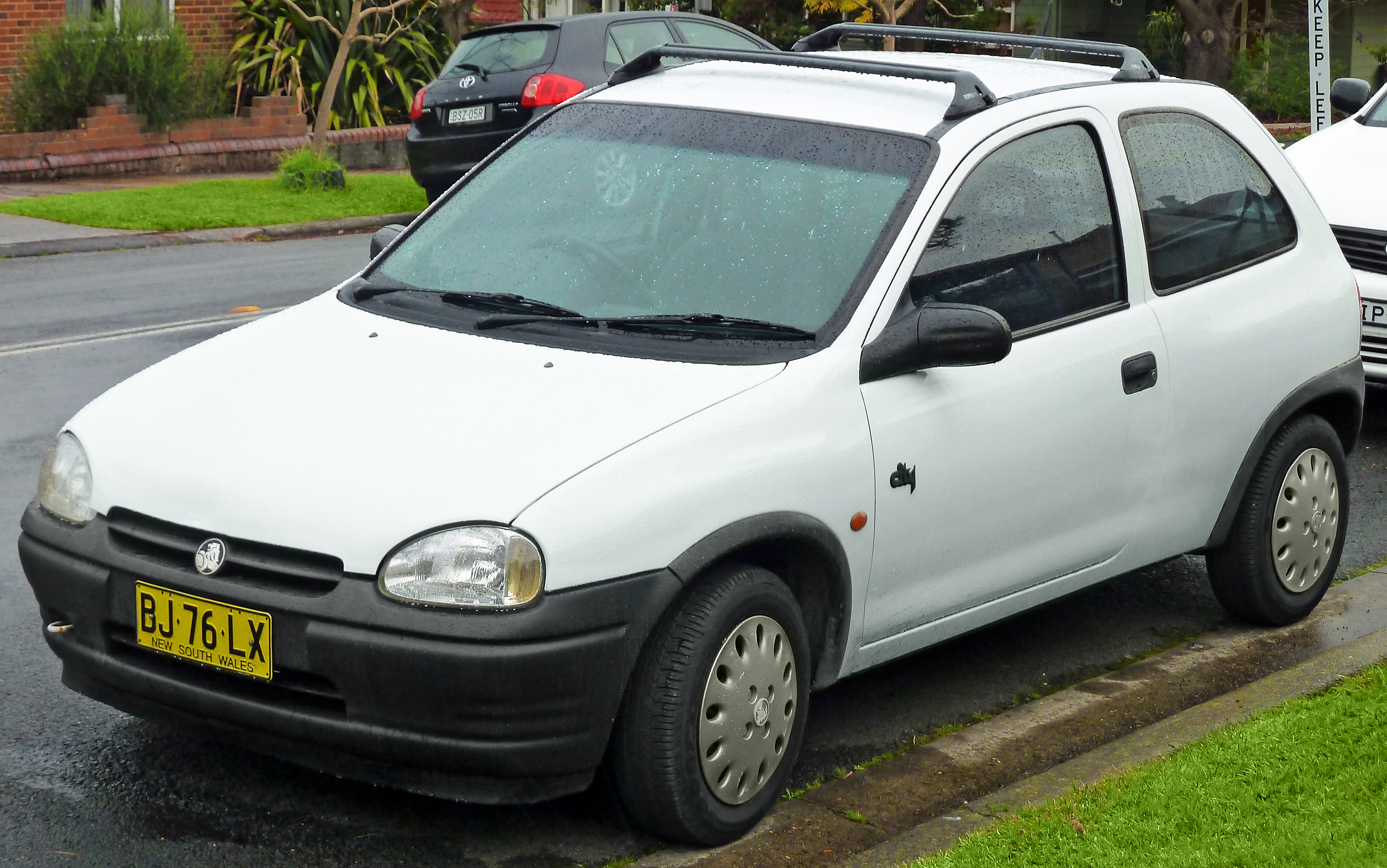
  1996–1997 Holden Barina (SB) City 3-door hatchback (pre-facelift)
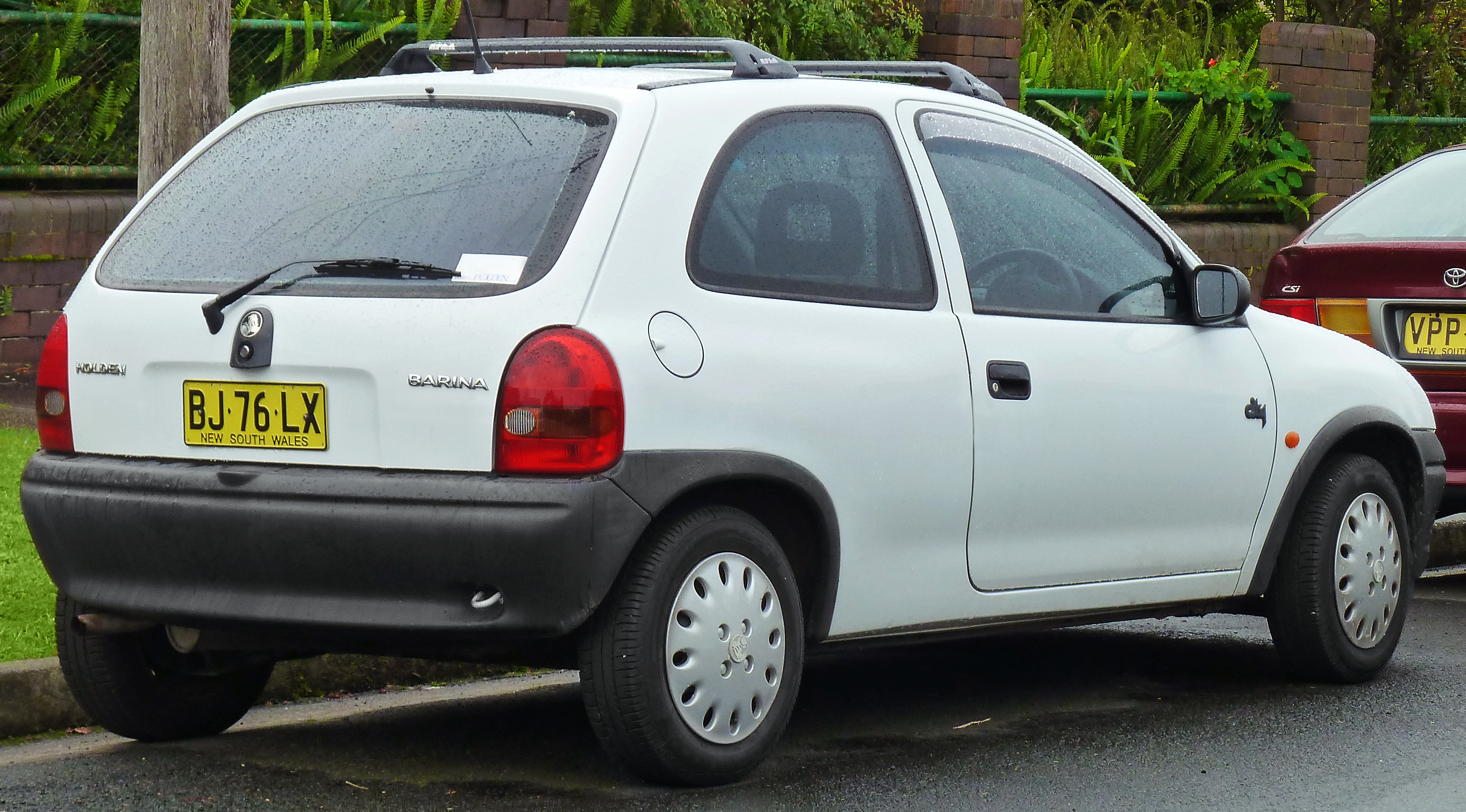
  1996–1997 Holden Barina (SB) City 3-door hatchback (pre-facelift)
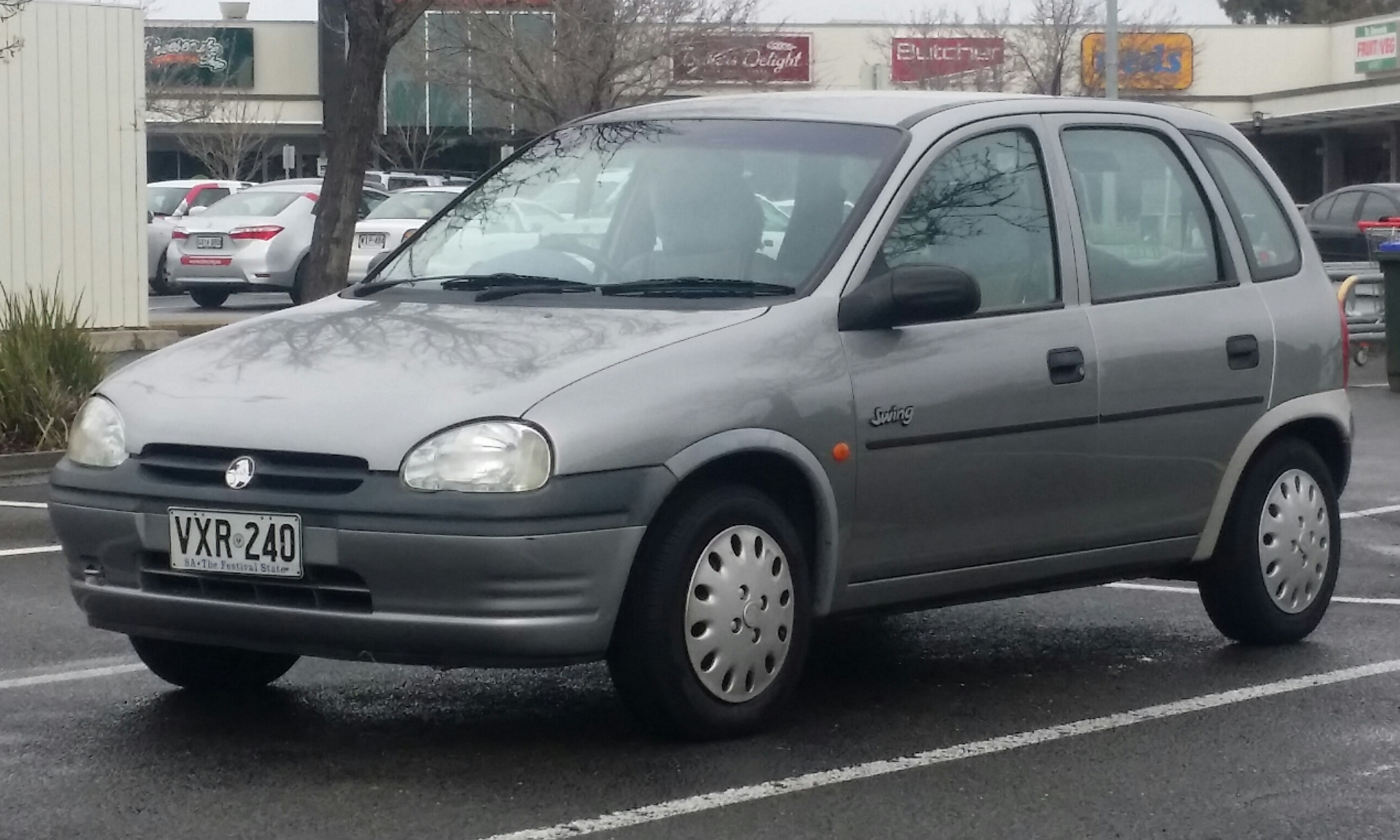
  1995–1997 Holden Barina (SB) Swing 5-door hatchback (pre-facelift)
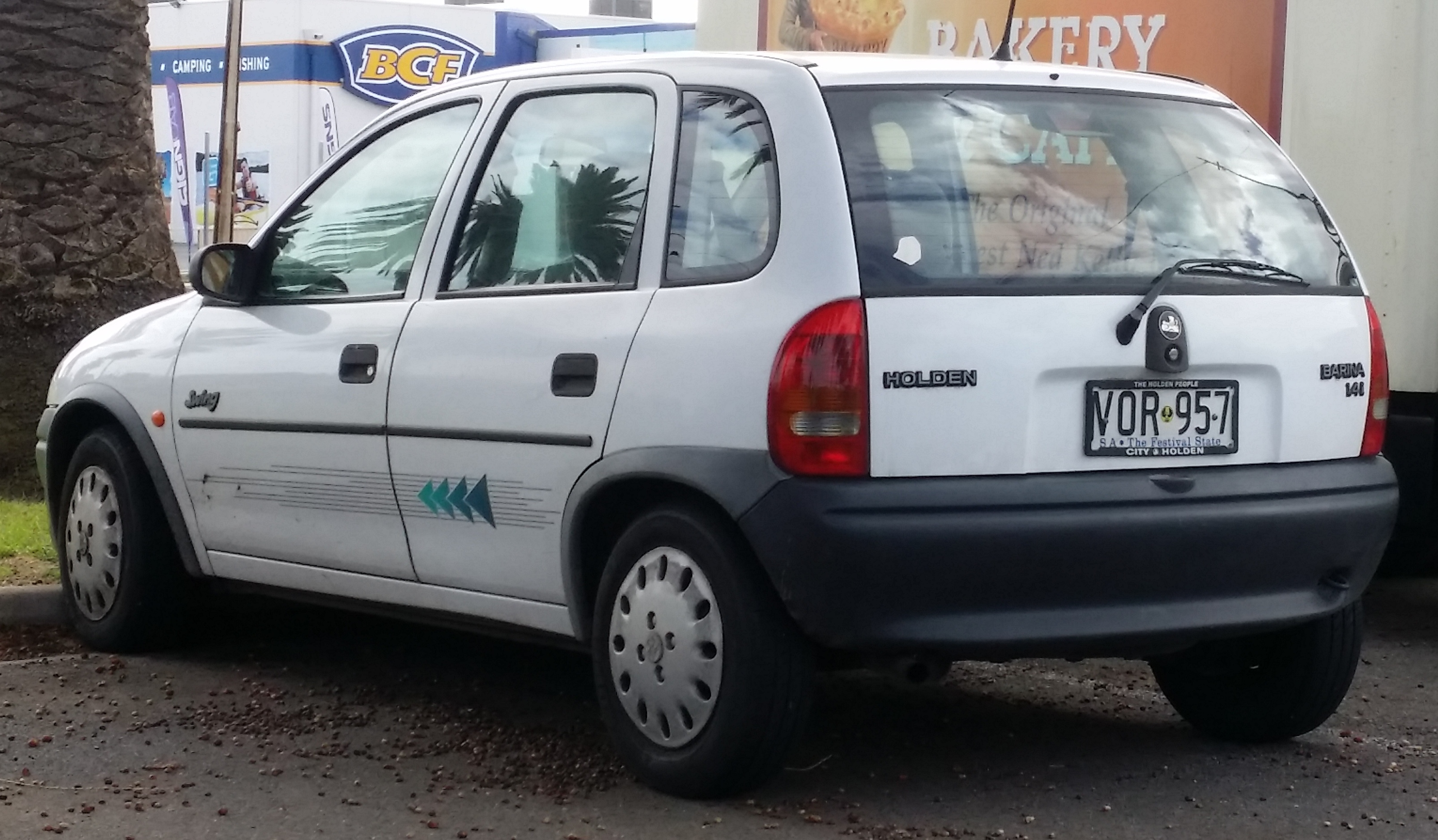
  1995–1997 Holden Barina (SB) Swing 5-door hatchback (pre-facelift)

Post-facelift

- 1.4-litre C14SE – City 3-door (1997–2000)
- 1.4-litre C14SE – Olympic City 3-door (1999–2000) – special edition
- 1.4-litre C14SE – Swing 5-door (1997–2000)
- 1.4-litre C14SE – Olympic Swing 5-door (1999–2000) – special edition
- 1.4-litre C14SE – Lambada 5-door (1997) – special edition
- 1.4-litre C14SE – Cabrio 3-door (1997–2000)
- 1.6-litre X16SE – GSi 3-door (1997–1999)
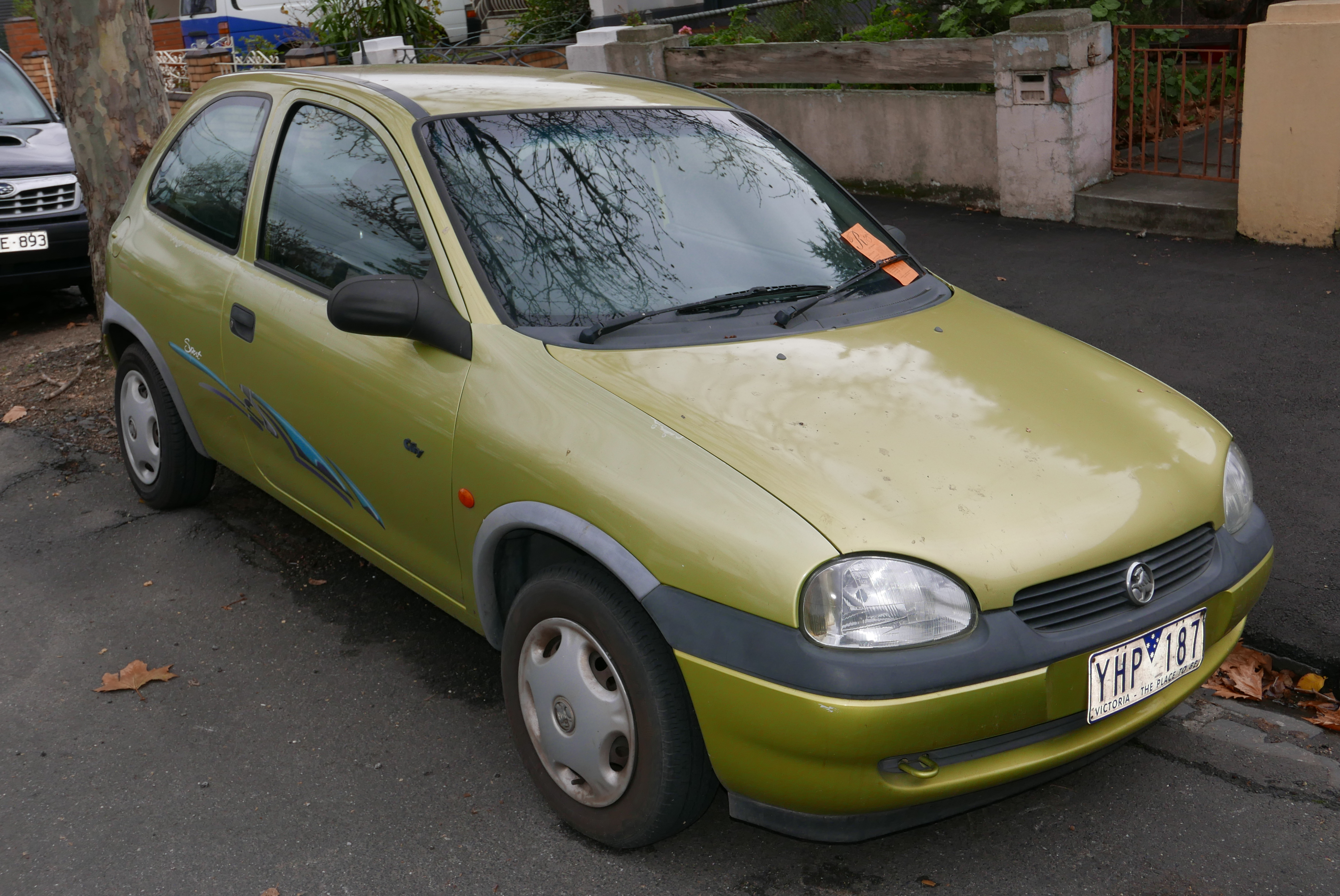
  Holden Barina (SB) 3-door hatchback (facelift)
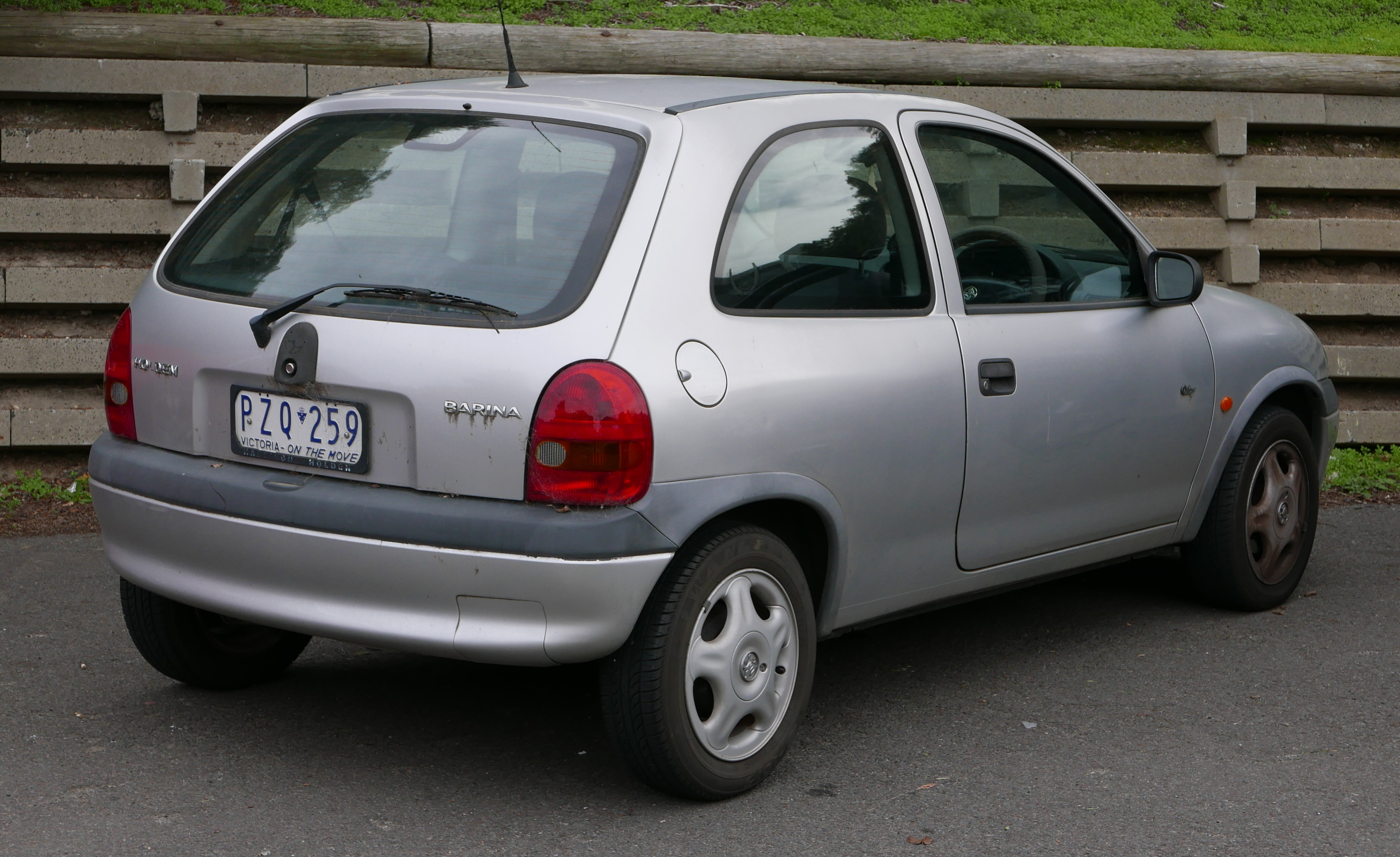
  Holden Barina (SB) 3-door hatchback (facelift)
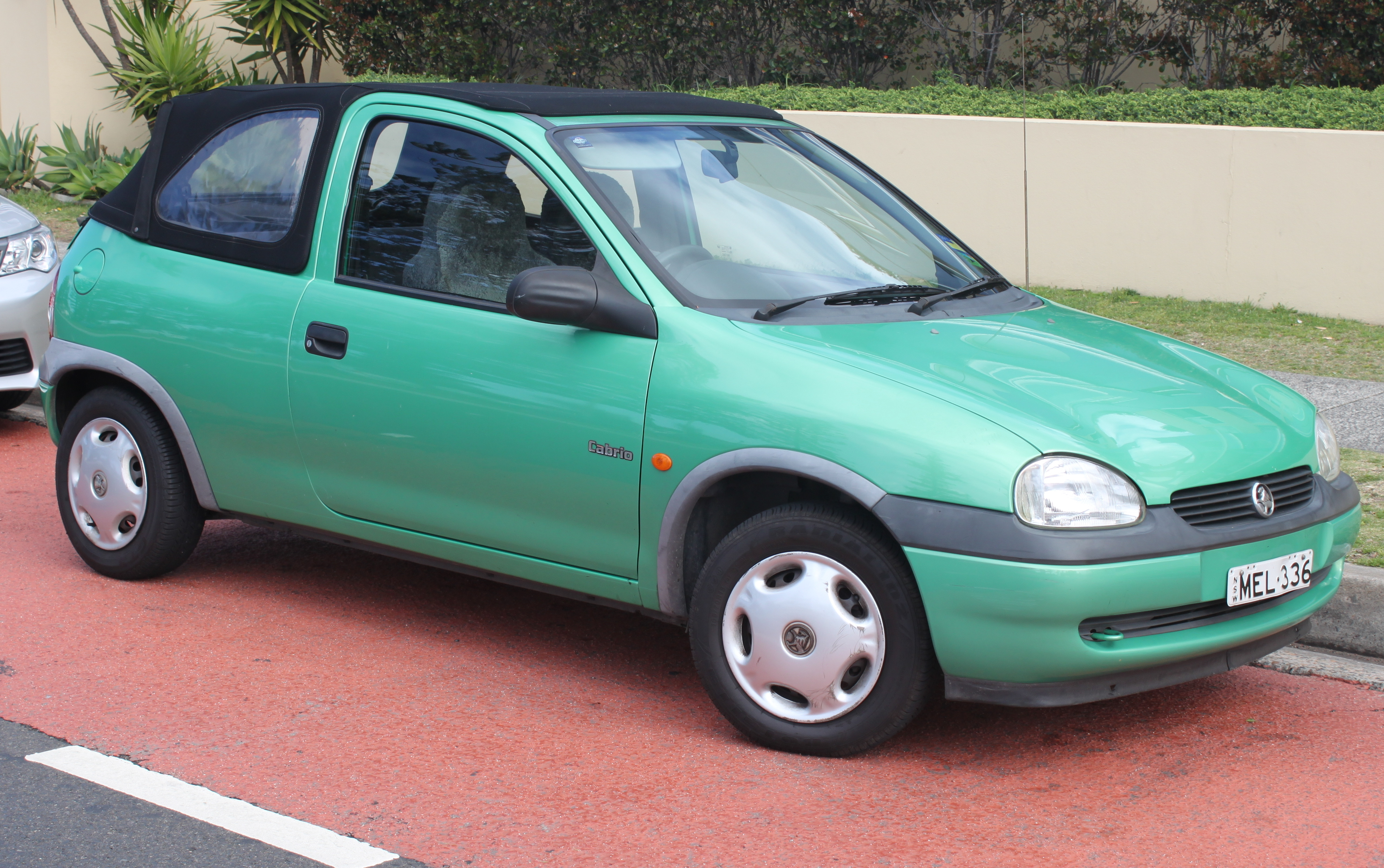
  1998 Holden Barina (SB) Cabrio convertible (facelift)
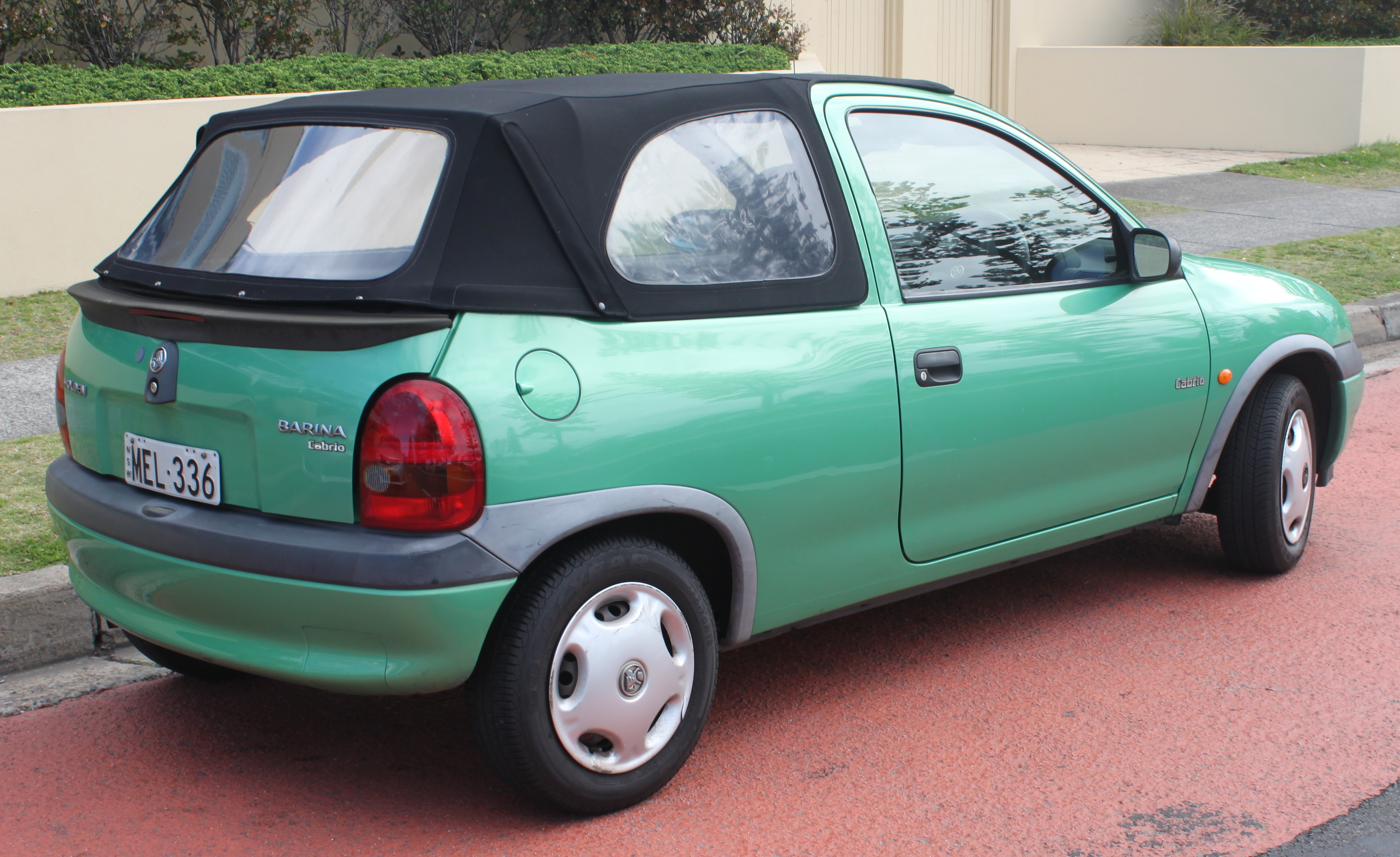
  1998 Holden Barina (SB) Cabrio convertible (facelift)

In August 1997, there was an update featuring multipoint fuel injection across the range and suspension upgrades to improve ride and handling. These models can be identified by their half body coloured bumpers, three-bar grille, and updated trim and badging.

During 1997, Holden released the special edition Lambada. Limited to 500 cars, the Lambada 3-door hatchback added a sunroof, 14 inch alloys, body coloured bumpers, and power steering over the City it was based on. Holden offered the choice of Casablanca White, Atlantis Blue, and Mint Green.

From November 1997 until late 2000, Holden sold the Barina Cabrio soft top convertible. Only 581 were sold. Based on the Barina City three-door hatchback, the soft top version was built in Spain like the rest of the SB series lineup. However, once imported into Australia, Holden organised for the conversion into cabriolets at Clayton, Victoria through its performance vehicle partner, Holden Special Vehicles (HSV). Separately in mainland Europe, the same concept was sold from 1995 as the Opel Corsa Twister, converted by R&R Kupfer in the Dutch city of Dordrecht. A small number were exported to the United Kingdom between 1998 and 1999 for sale with Vauxhall Corsa branding.

The final cars were built in 2000, but sales continued into 2001 until the XC model arrived. In the 2008 Used Car Safety Ratings, the SB Barina was assessed as providing an "average" protection.

== Fourth generation (XC; 2001–2005) ==
The fourth-generation XC Barina was released in April 2001, based on the Opel Corsa C platform. It was available to the Australian market in 3 Door and 5 Door models with a Z14XE 1.4-litre 16-valve engine. In September of that year an SRi model with a new Z18XE 1.8-litre engine and the 3-door 1.4-litre SXi joined the line-up. The Barina was awarded the Wheels Car of the Year award for 2001. Limited edition Equipe models were released in April 2002.

In January 2003 for the MY03 update, the SXi three-door and CD five-door models replaced the base 1.4-litre cars, but slower sales prompted Holden to revert to the unbadged base model names again from mid-2004 (MY04.5), despite a facelift from January 2004 (MY04) that saw a new nose treatment, some steering and suspension modifications, trim changes and a heavily revised 1.4-litre engine in manual-only base model Barinas.

In the 2008 Used Car Safety Ratings the XC Barina was rated as providing a "better than average" level of occupant protection in the event of an accident, with ANCAP rating the model four out of five stars.

Pre-facelift

- 1.4-litre Z14XE – "base" 3-door (2001–2002)
- 1.4-litre Z14XE – "base" 5-door (2001–2002)
- 1.4-litre Z14XE – Equipe 3-door (2002)
- 1.4-litre Z14XE – Equipe 5-door (2002)
- 1.4-litre Z14XE – SXi 3-door (2003; MY03)
- 1.4-litre Z14XE – CD 5-door (2003; MY03)
- 1.8-litre Z18XE – SRi 3-door (2001–2003)
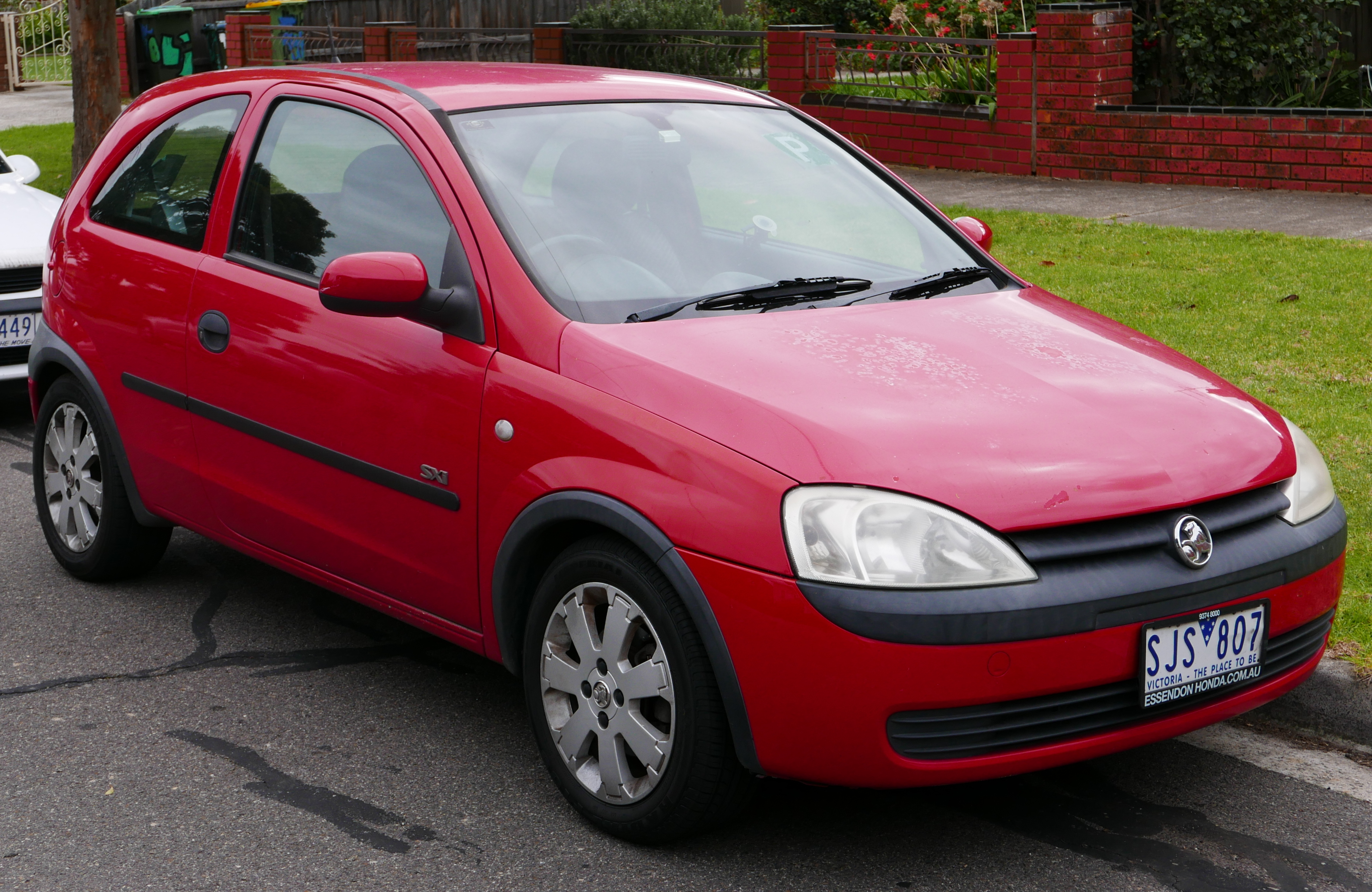
2003 Holden Barina 3-door (XC; pre-facelift)

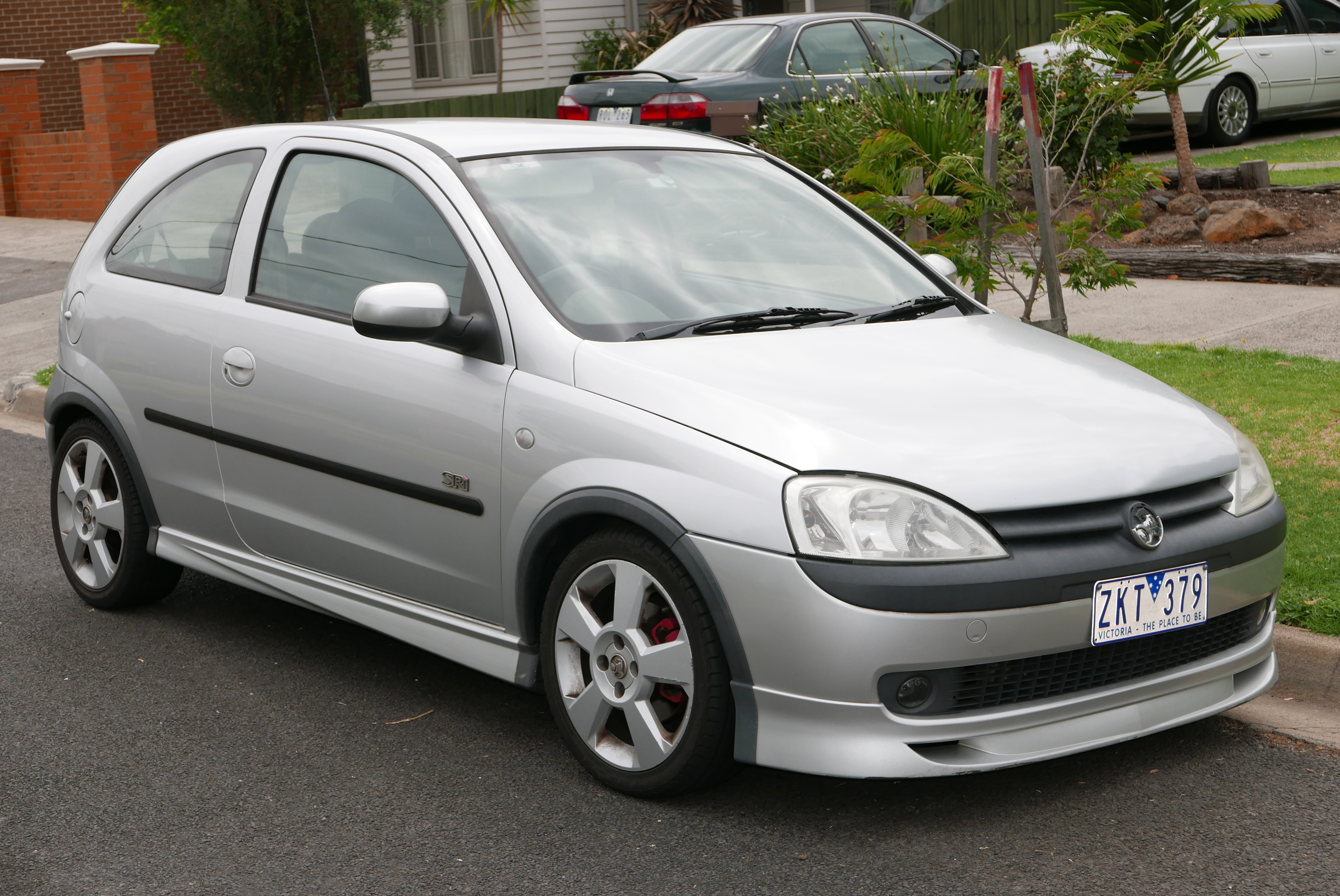
Holden Barina SRi 3-door (XC; pre-facelift)

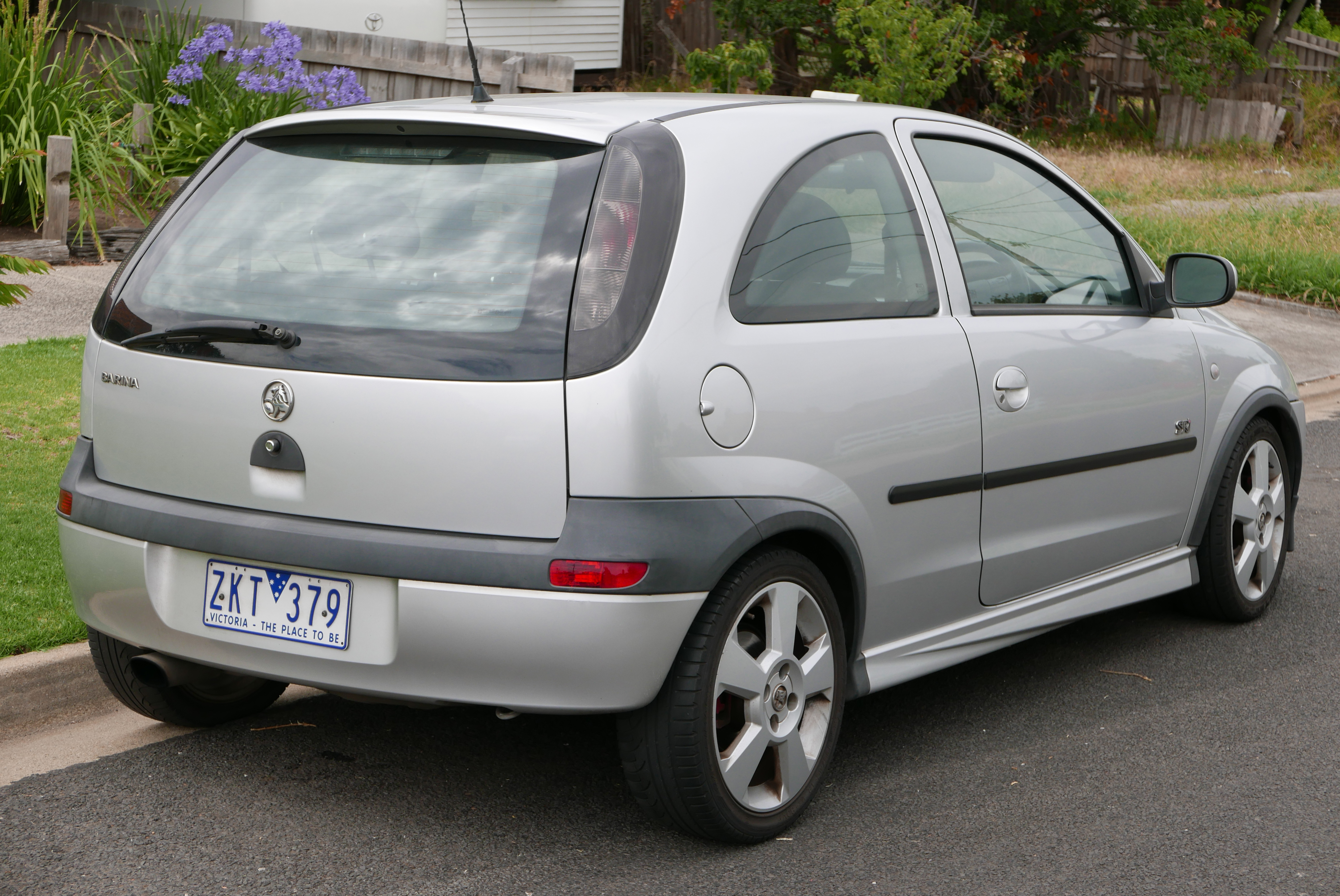
Holden Barina SRi 3-door (XC; pre-facelift)

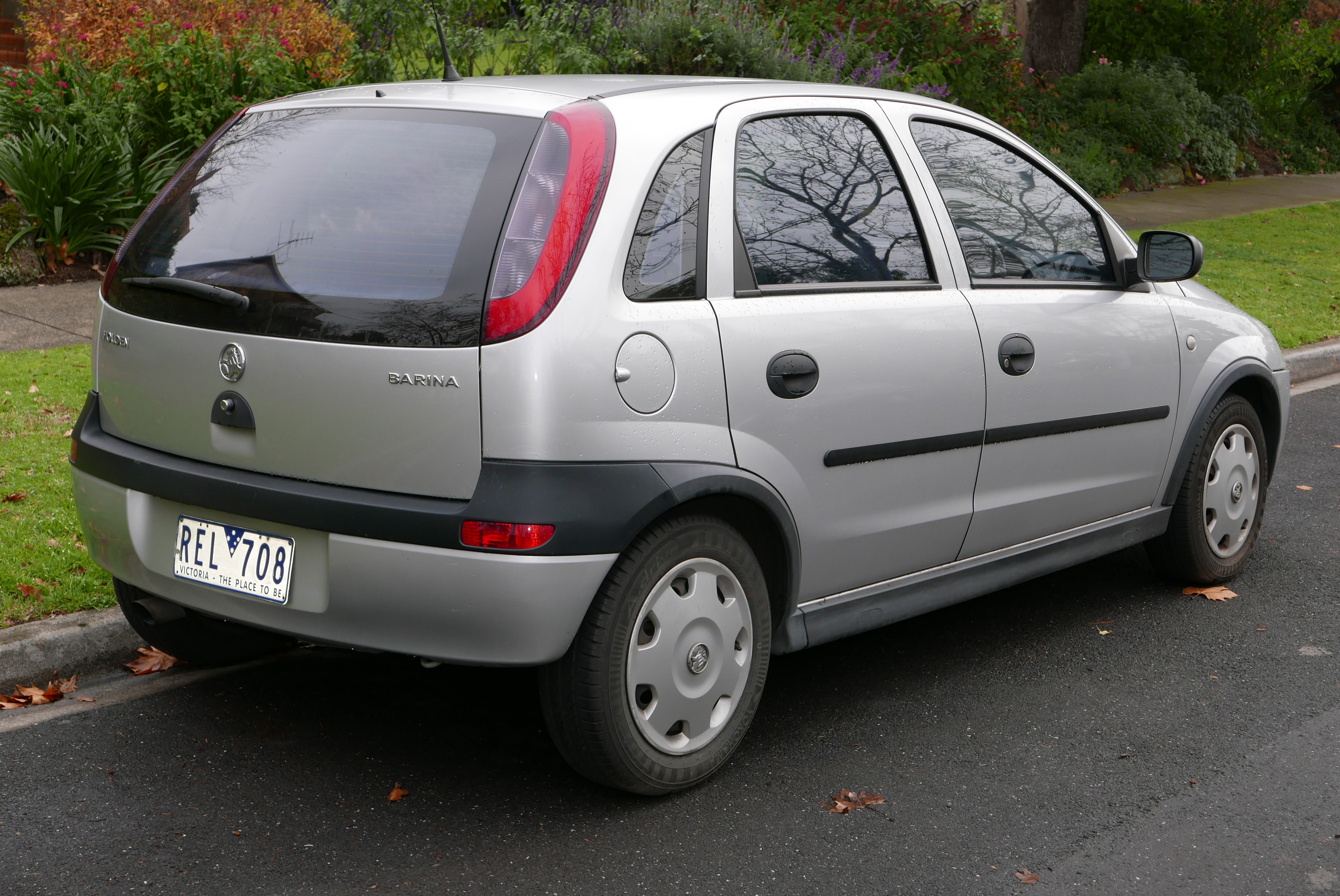
Holden Barina 5 door (XC; pre-facelift)

Post-facelift

- 1.4-litre Z14XEP – SXi 3-door (2004; MY04)
- 1.4-litre Z14XEP – CD 5-door (2004; MY04)
- 1.4-litre Z14XEP – "base" 3-door (2004–2005; MY04.5 and MY05)
- 1.4-litre Z14XEP – "base" 5-door (2004–2005; MY04.5 and MY05)
- 1.8-litre Z18XE – SRi 3-door (2004–2005)
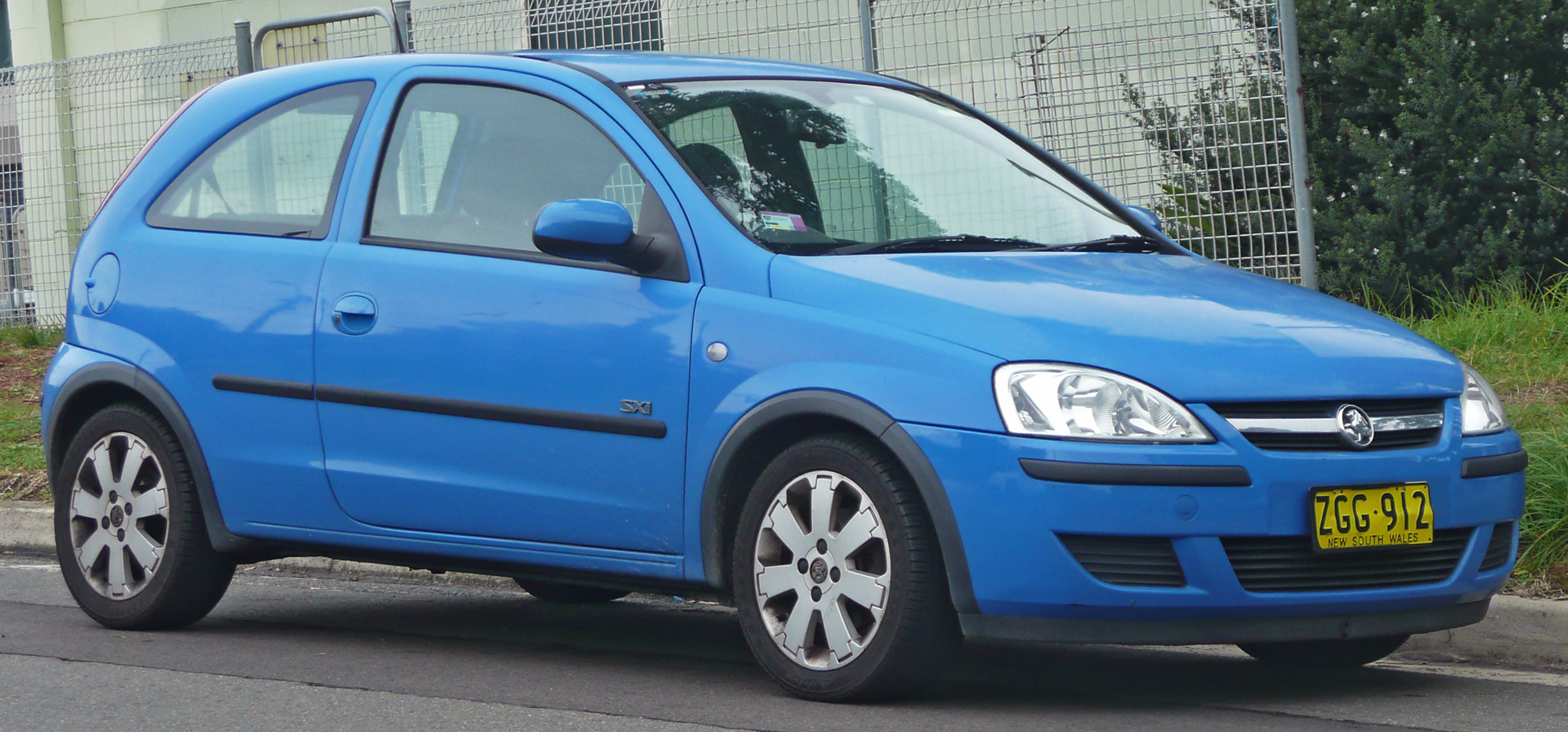
2004 Holden Barina (XC MY04) SXi 3-door

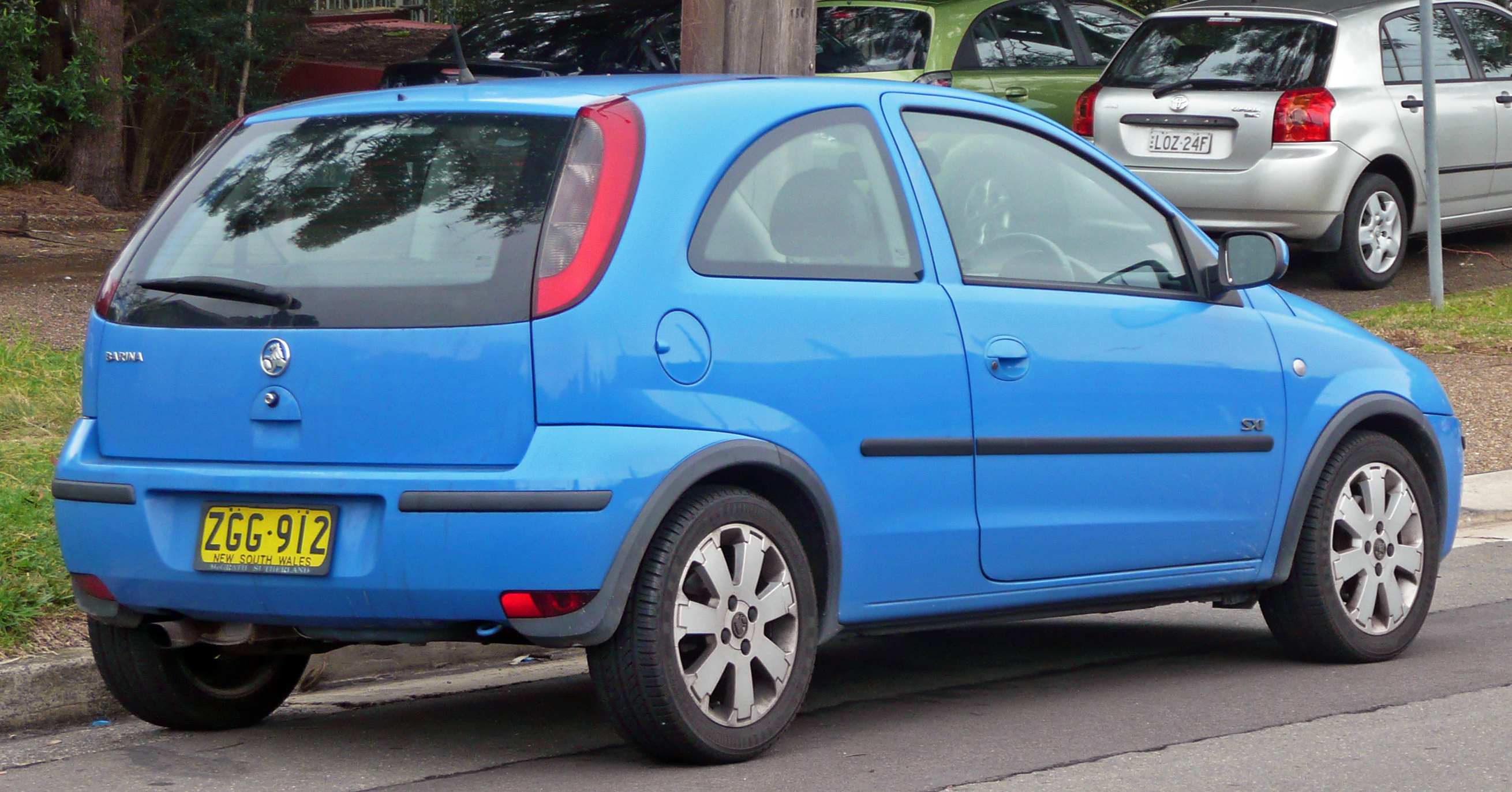
2004 Holden Barina (XC MY04) SXi 3-door

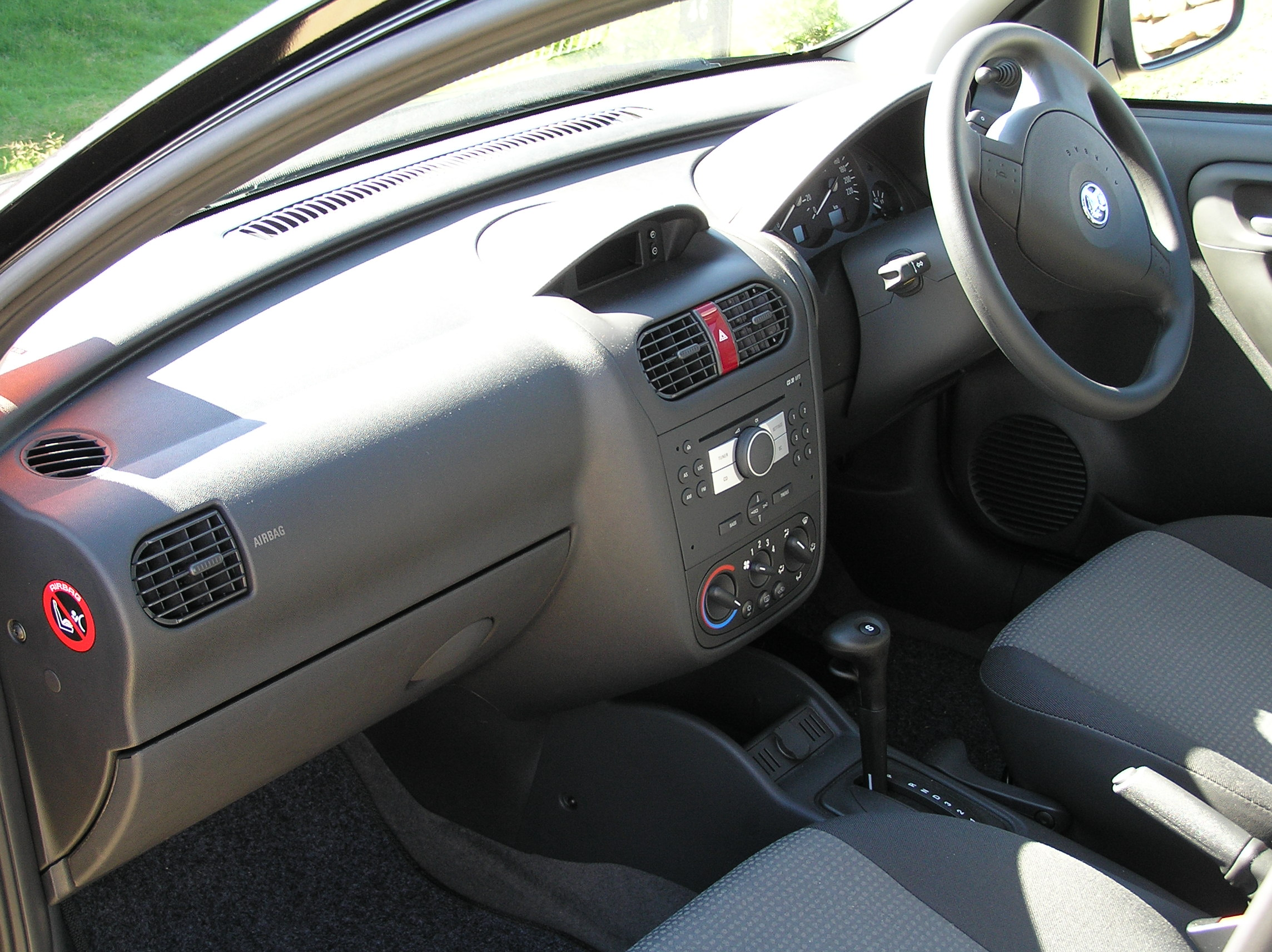
Interior

== Fifth generation (TK; 2005–2011) ==
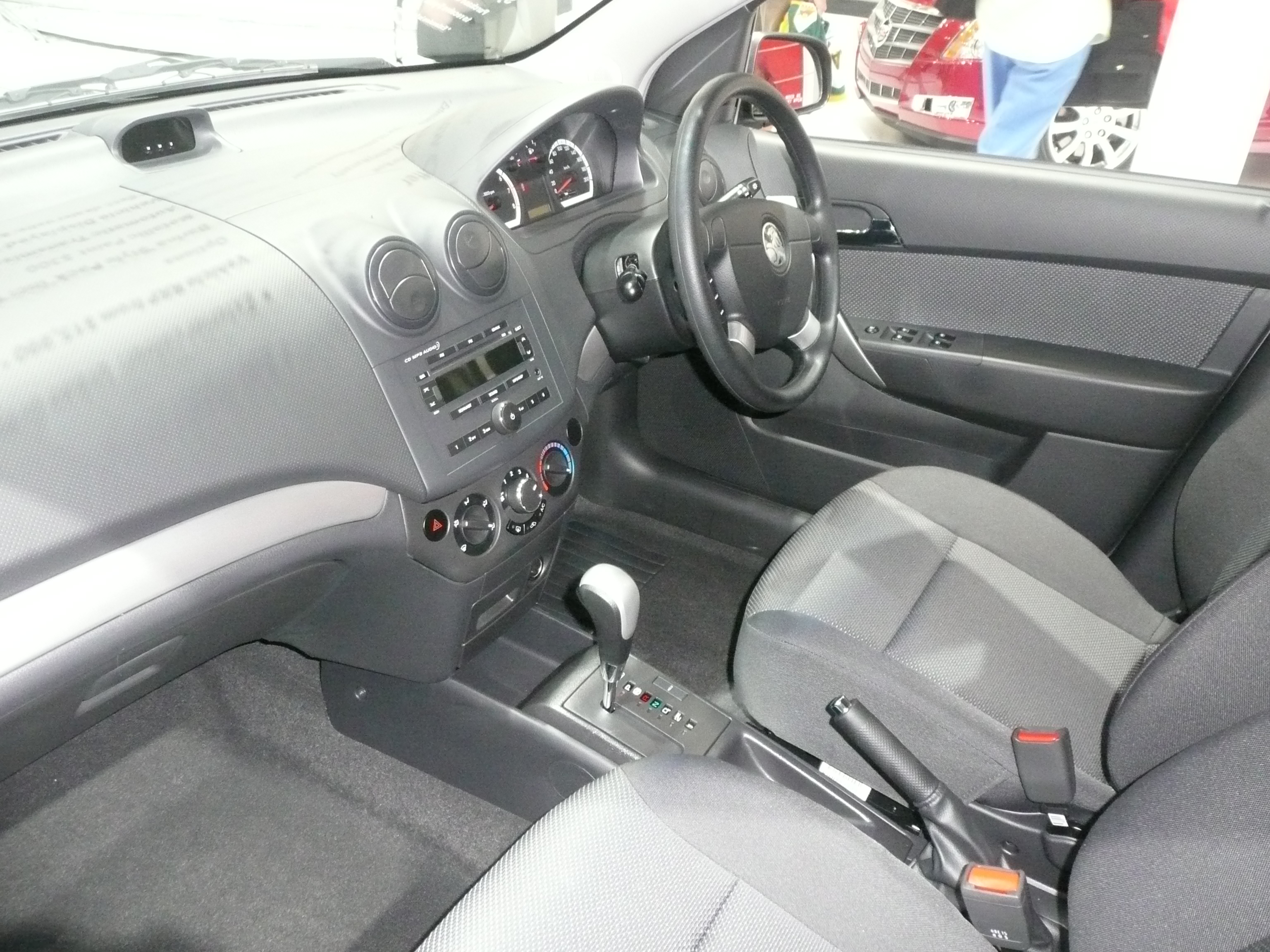
Interior

In December 2005, Holden dropped the Opel-sourced Barina and rebadged the Daewoo Kalos hatchback as the fifth generation TK Barina. In February 2006, a four-door sedan went on sale, the first sedan type for the Barina nameplate. It is also equipped with a 1.6-litre twin-cam 16-valve F16D3 Daewoo inline-four engine. The decision to use the Daewoo Kalos as a basis for the car was made to ensure Holden remained highly competitive in the fast-growing small car market in Australia, facing fierce competition from other South Korean-sourced models like the Hyundai Getz. The Opel-sourced model sold at a large loss and was sold to build up a presence in the entry-level new car market in Australia. The Holden Barina was sold in single specification, starting at A$12,990 for the 3-door, which was later changed to A$13,490.

The Daewoo-sourced Holden Barina scored a lower two out of five star ANCAP rating than its European-built, Opel-based predecessor. Criticism was focused on the 2006 Barina TK sedan because of these crash test results, one of the worst in recorded history. As a result, Denny Mooney, the managing director of Holden, was forced to publicly defend the perceived poor reputation of the TK Barina.

=== Pre-facelift ===
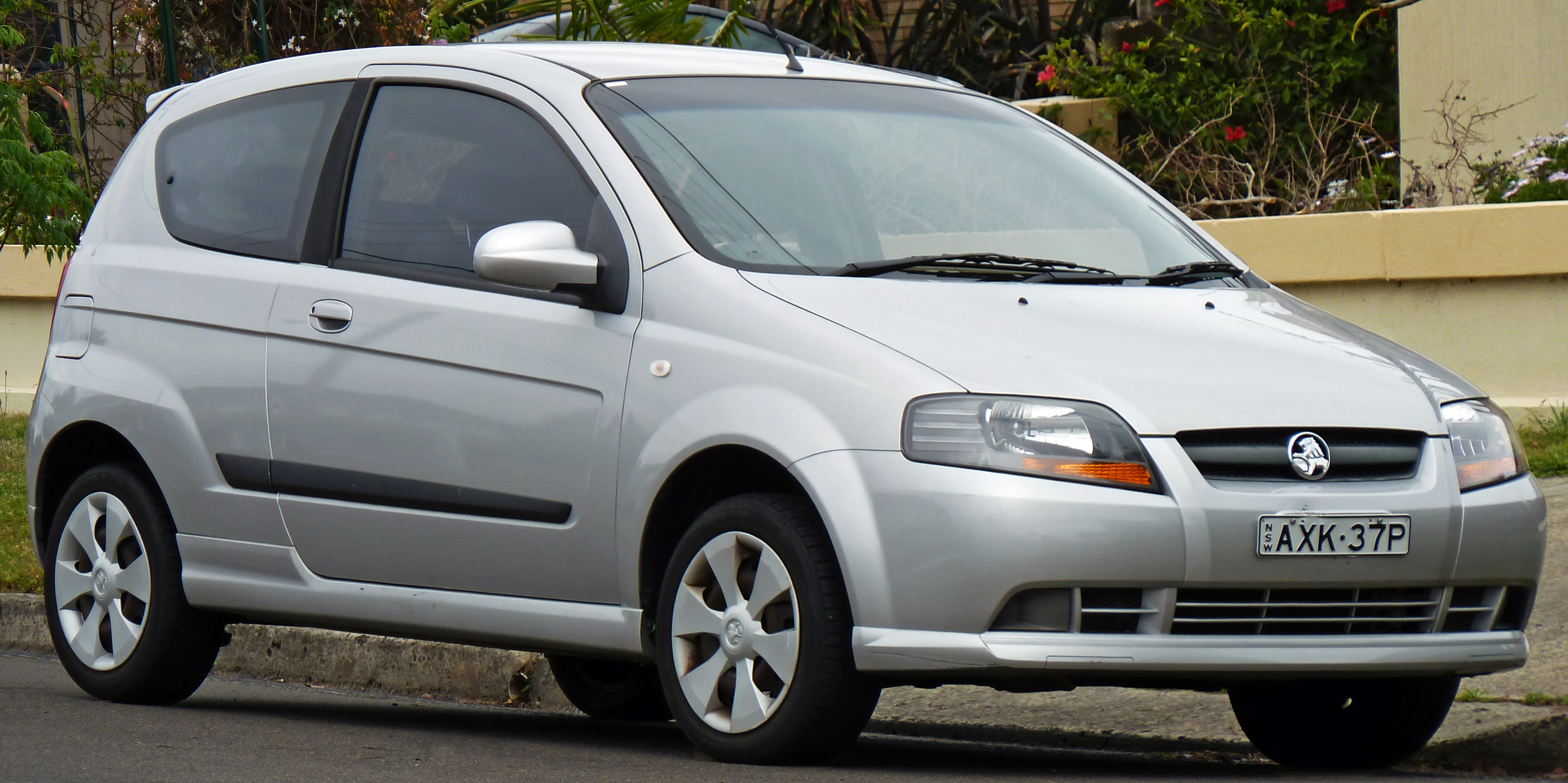
2006 Holden Barina (TK) 3-door hatchback (pre-facelift)

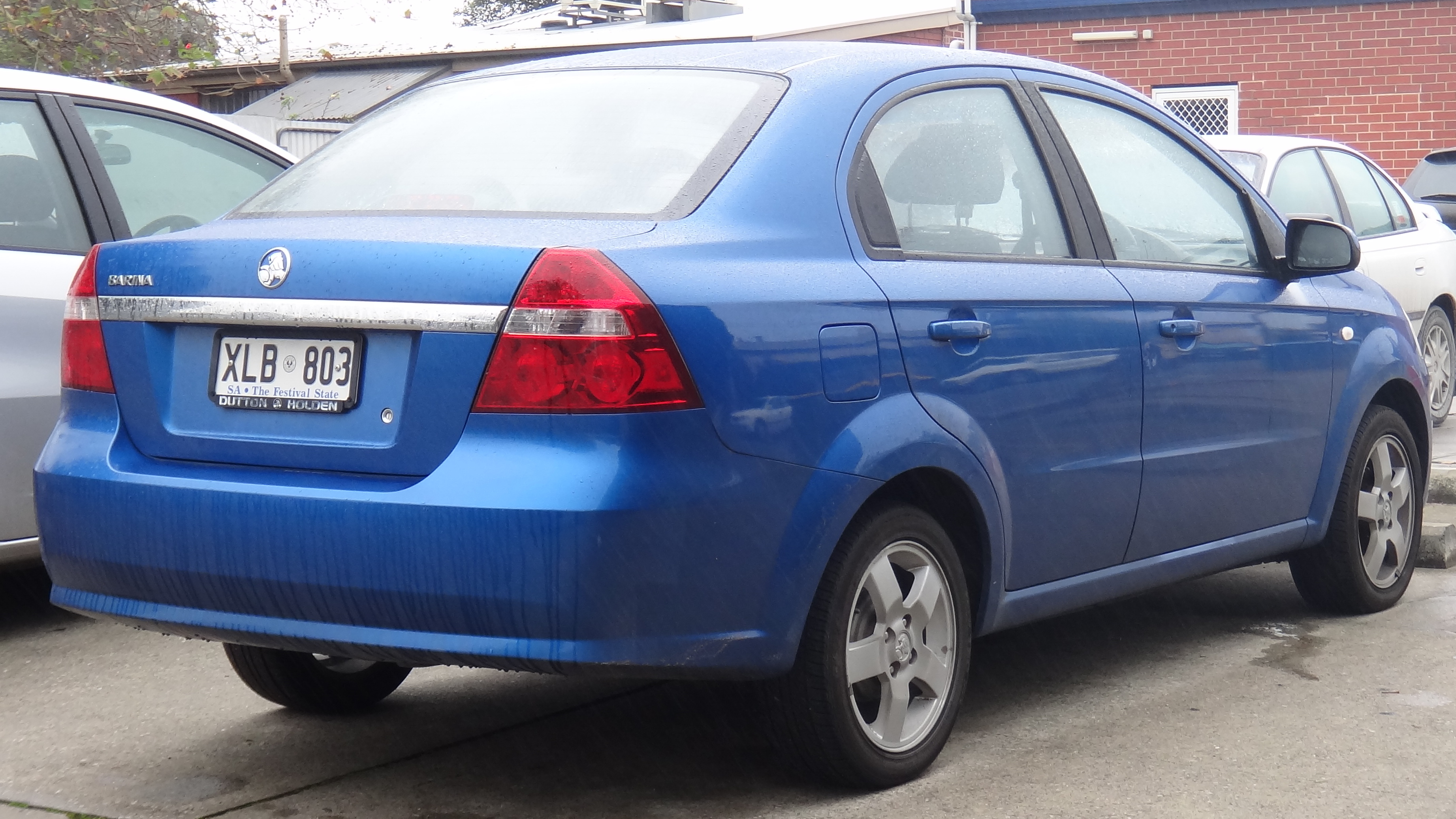
2006 Holden Barina (TK) sedan (pre-facelift)

=== Facelift ===
The updated TK Barina hatchback was released in August 2008. It has been facelifted with a bolder grille, new headlamps and tail lamps, along with the same interior seen on the sedan model introduced in 2006. Power windows and electric mirrors were standardised in the updated Barina's specification. Safety-wise, side-impact air bags have been included as standard fitment. As a result of this, and structural improvements including a high-strength steel reinforced B-pillar, ANCAP rated the car four out of five stars, up from two.

Common issues with the TK throughout the model run were Holden's use of an unusual all-plastic thermostat housing design on the engine, which could fail and split apart due to repeated stress and heat cycles. The ABS system is known for electrical faults and failure of the ABS system to operate if the warning light illuminates. Front tire wear was high in the early 2006 models due to factory suspension camber settings, which were revised by 2008. Automatic transmission TK cars were also the subject of a recall due to internal shift solenoids not allowing the car to shift higher than 3rd gear.

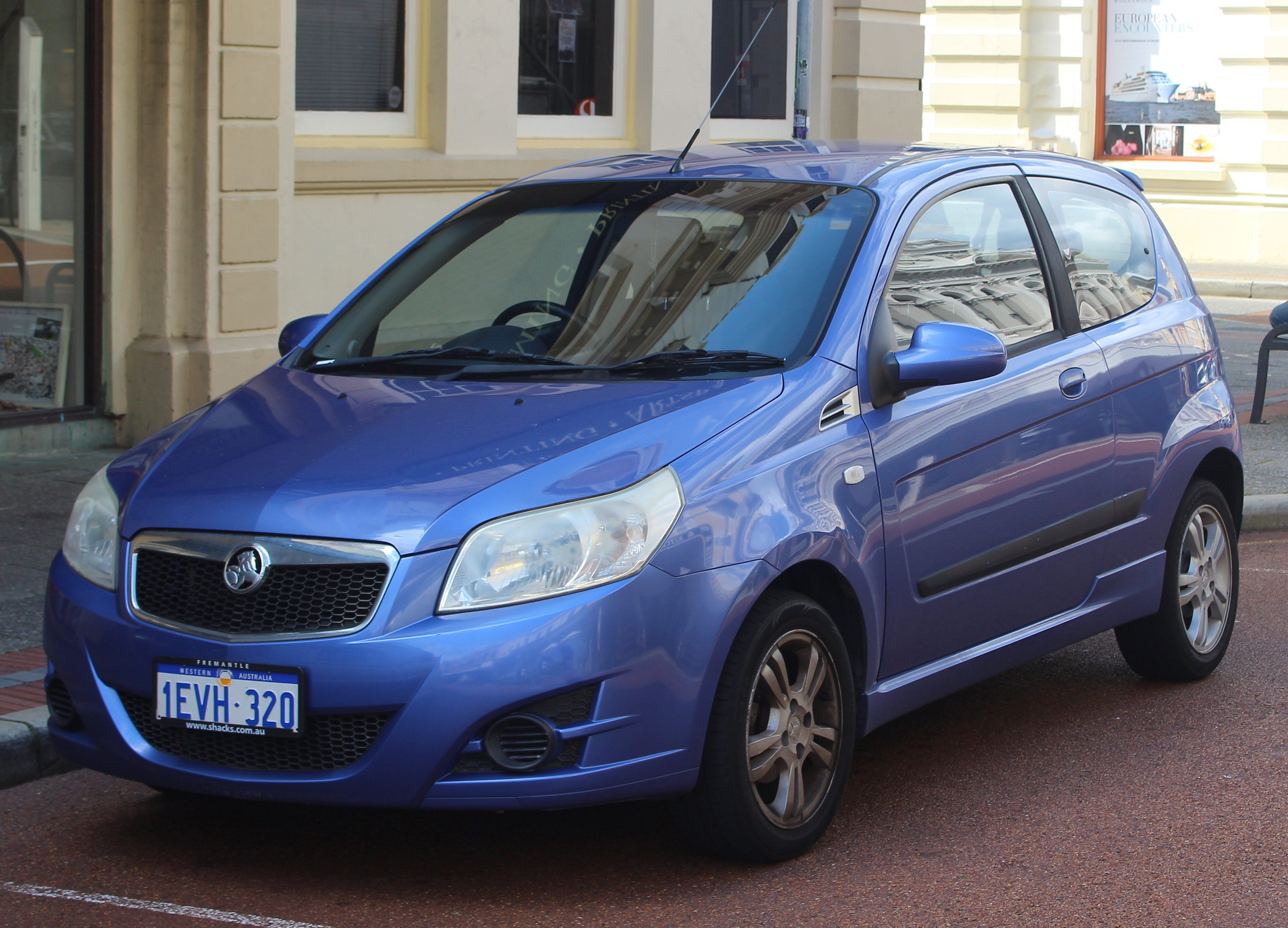
2008–2010 Holden Barina (TK) 3-door hatchback (facelift)

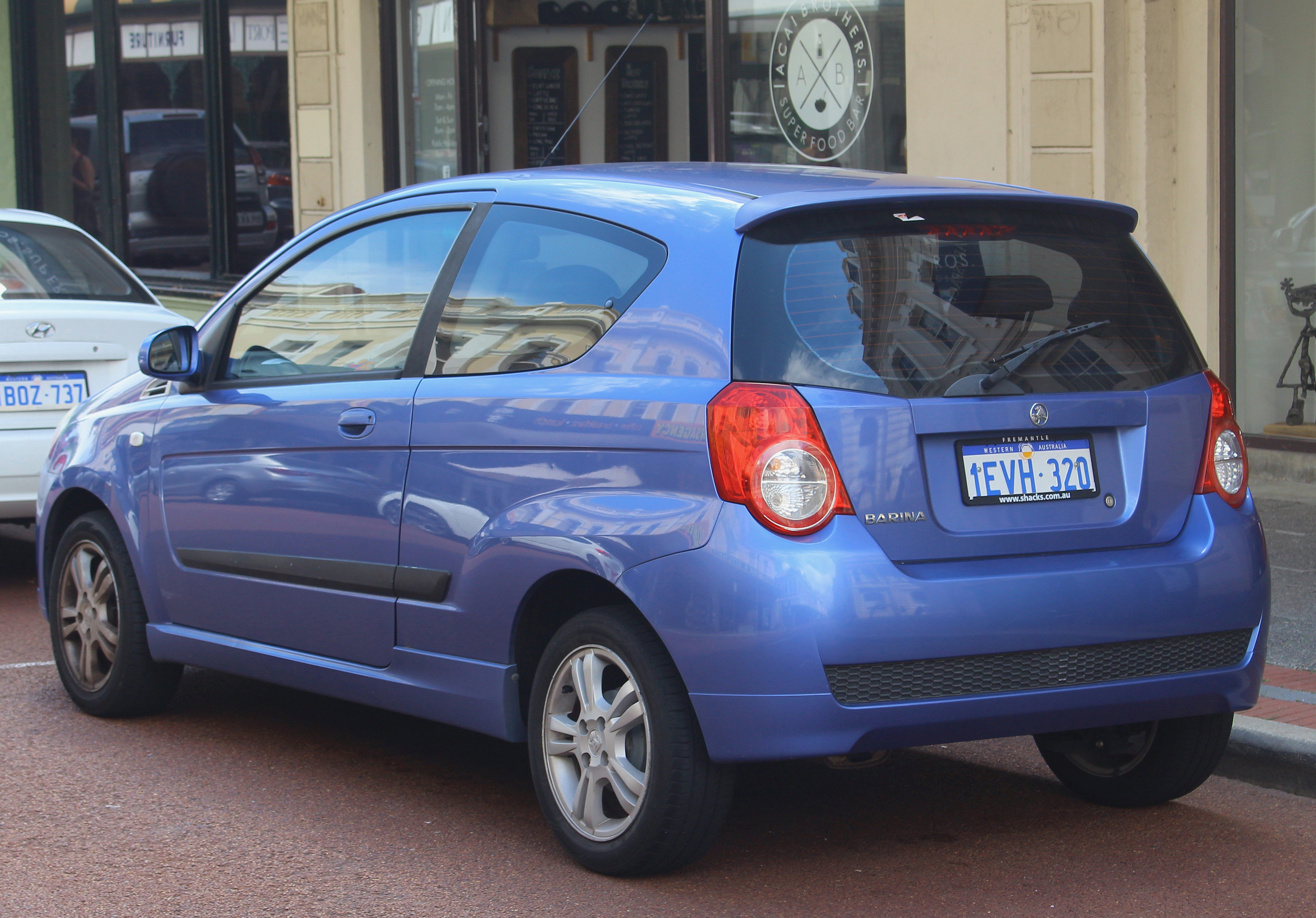
2008–2010 Holden Barina (TK) 3-door hatchback (facelift)

=== Safety ===
ANCAP test results* Holden Barina 5 door hatch (2005)
Test	Score
Overall	2 /5 stars
Frontal offset	4.39/16
Side impact	10.51/16
Pole	Not Assessed
Seat belt reminders	0/3
Whiplash protection	Not Assessed
Pedestrian protection	Poor
Electronic stability control	Not Assessed

ANCAP test results* Holden Barina 3 door hatch variants (2008)
Test	Score
Overall	4 /5 stars
Frontal offset	9.03/16
Side impact	14.85/16
Pole	Not Assessed
Seat belt reminders	1/3
Whiplash protection	Not Assessed
Pedestrian protection	Not Assessed
Electronic stability control	Not Available

== Sixth generation (TM; 2011–2018) ==
The sixth generation TM series Barina debuted at the 2011 Australian International Motor Show held in Melbourne. The 5 door hatch was released for sale in November 2011 and the sedan was launched in February 2012. The TM Barina has a similar interior design seen on the smaller Barina Spark both sharing the same ice blue LCD gauge cluster and a similar centre stack design. The exterior looks much more like the Series II Holden Captiva with similar headlight and grille designs. The TM series is powered by a 1.6-litre petrol engine with a choice of a five-speed or 6-speed manual as well as a six-speed automatic transmission. The TM Barina is based on the second generation Chevrolet Aveo.

In 2015, a limited run Barina X was introduced, based on the CD model (base). Only 700 of them were produced for the Australian market.

The Barina was given a facelift in November 2016, with design updates given to the interior and exterior. The RS and Sedan models were dropped as part of the facelift.

On 14 September 2018, Holden announced that the Barina will be dropped from the line-up.

Pre-facelift

- 1.6-litre "F1III" - CD 5-door (2011–2016)
- 1.6-litre "F1III" - CD 4-door (2012–2016)
- 1.6-litre "F1III" - CDX 5-door (2012–2016)
- 1.6-litre "F1III" - CDX 4-door (2012–2016)
- 1.4-litre "LUV" - RS 5-door (2013–2016)
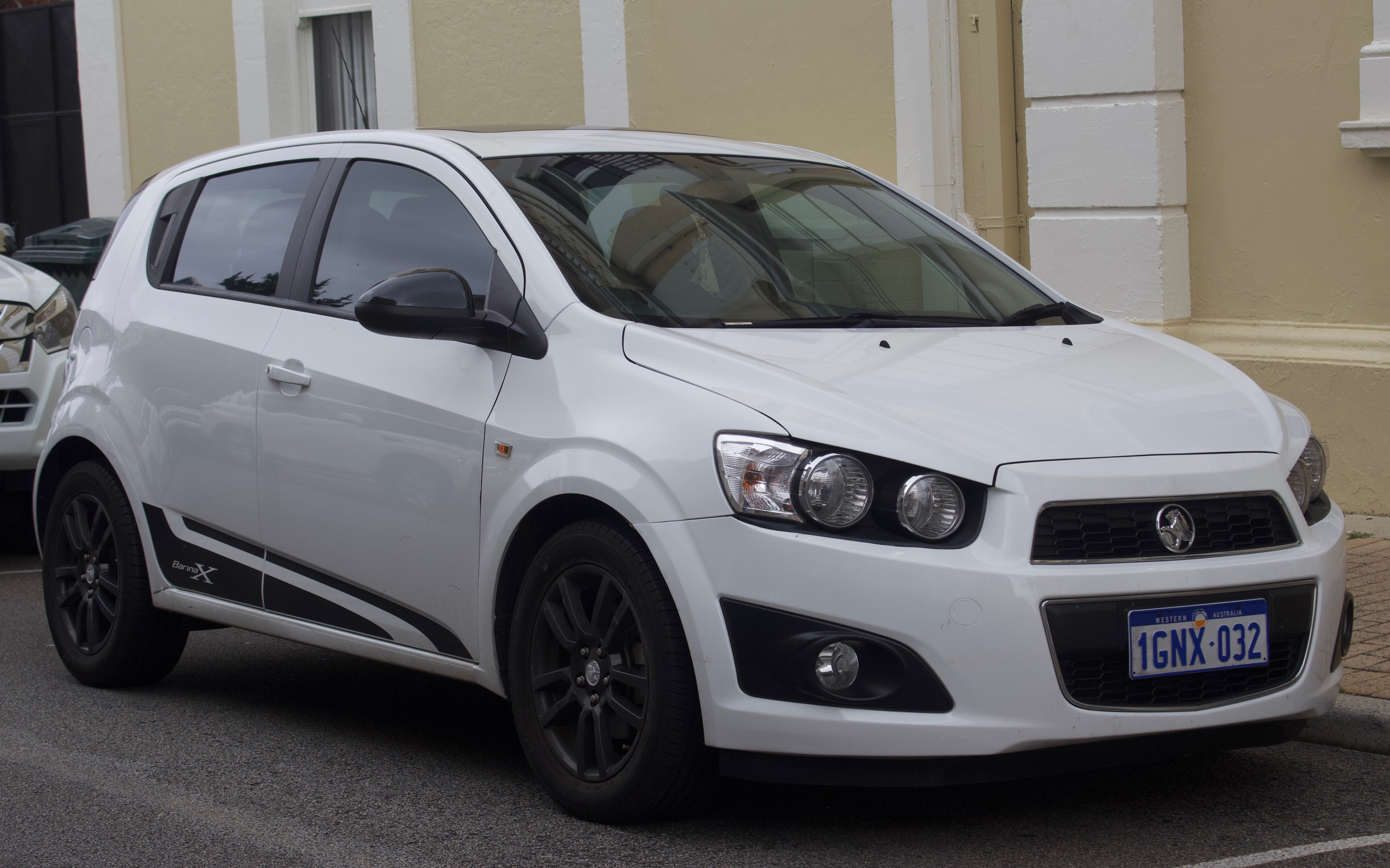
Holden Barina X (pre-facelift; front)

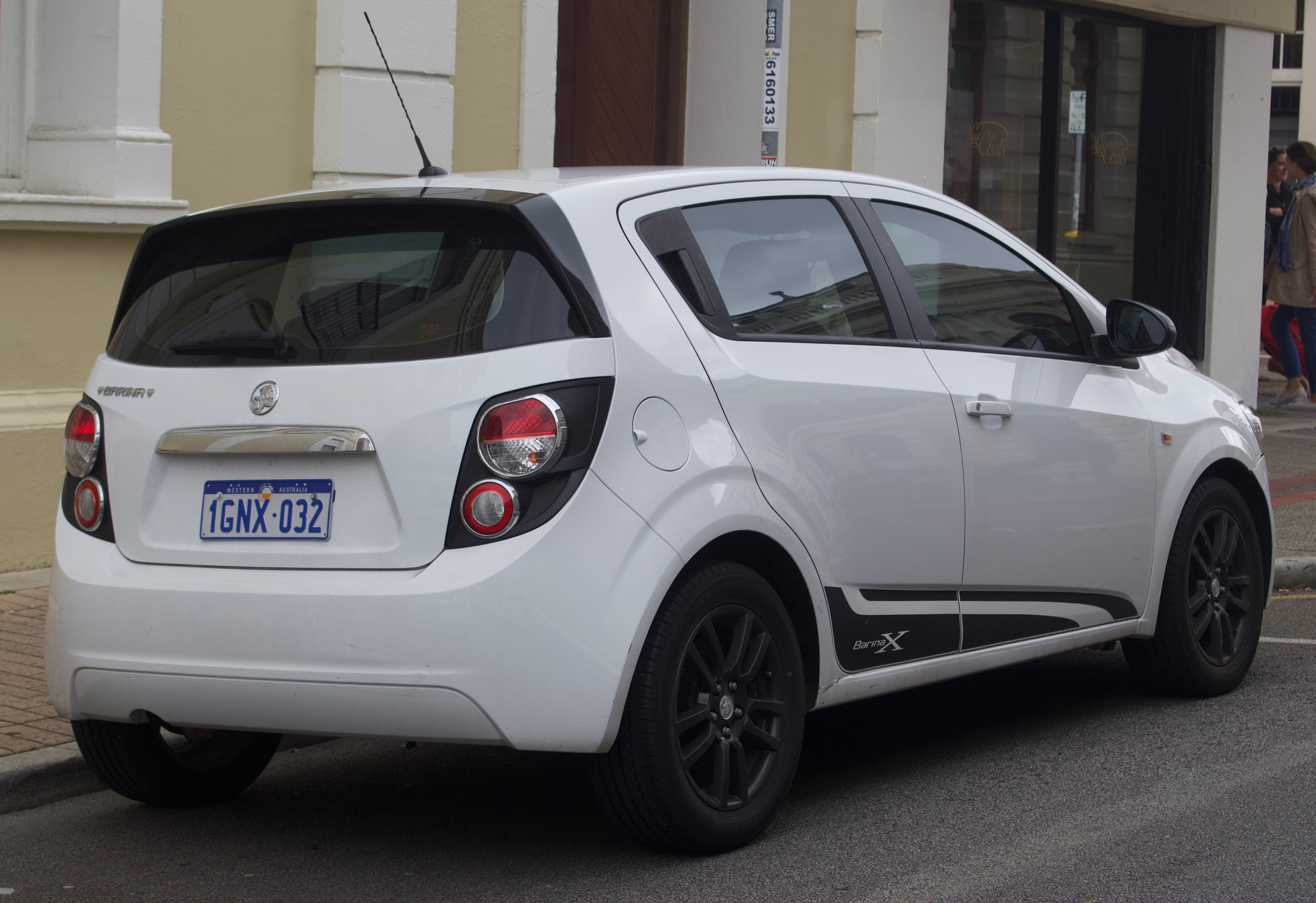
Holden Barina X (pre-facelift; rear)

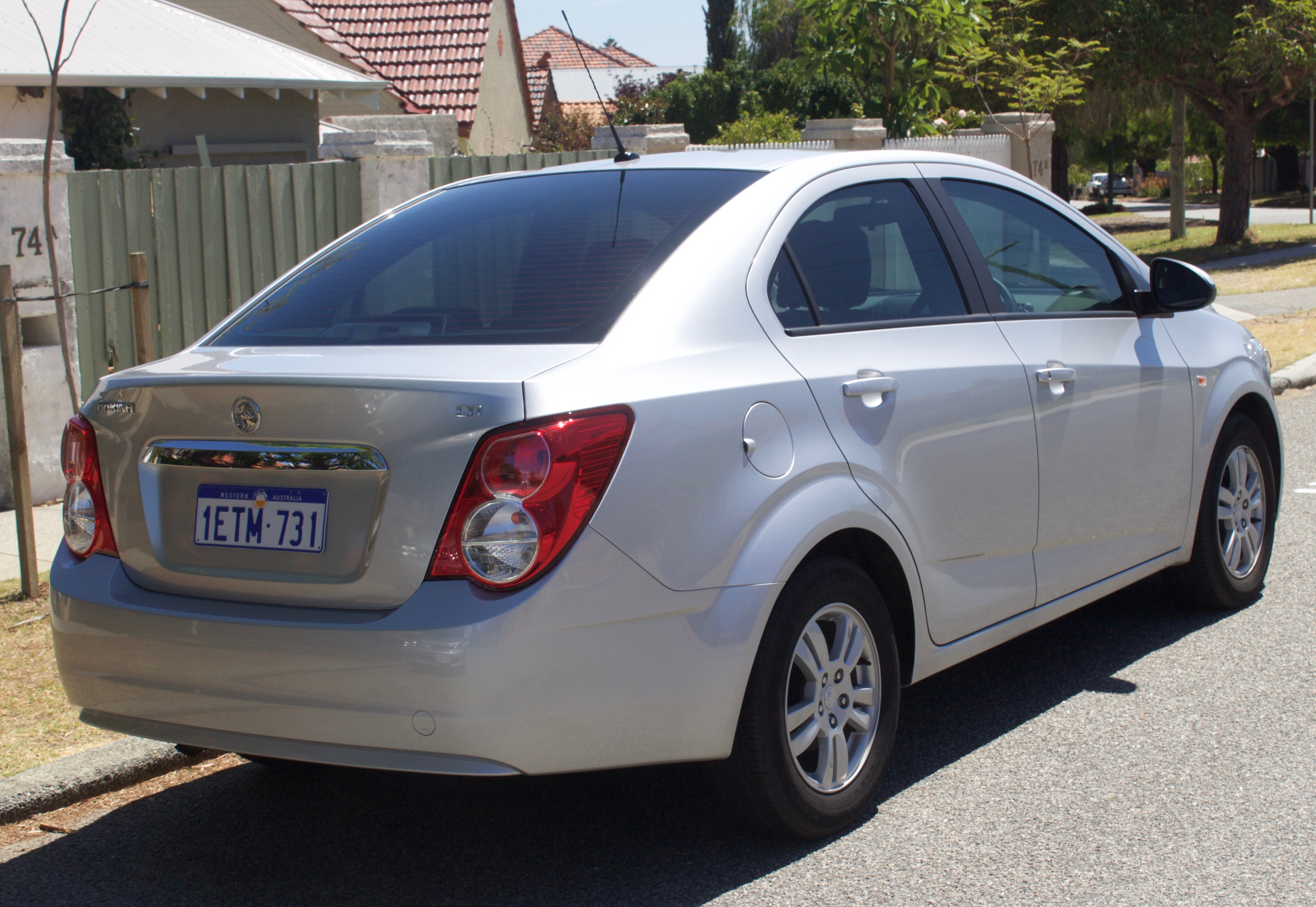
Holden Barina sedan (pre-facelift)

Post-facelift

- 1.6-litre "F1III" - LS 5-door (2016–2018)
- 1.6-litre "F1III" - LT 5-door (2016–2018)
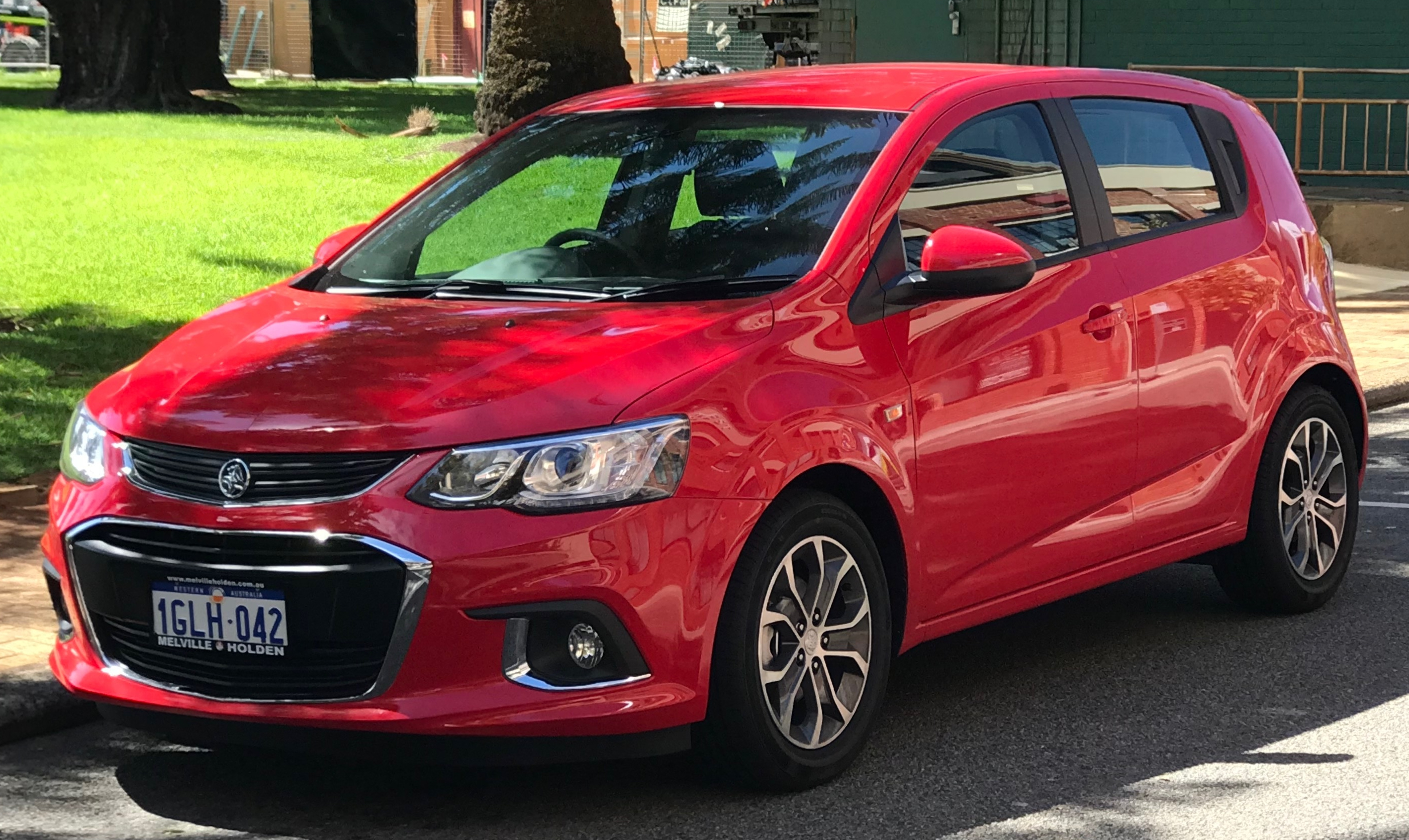
2018 Holden Barina (TM) LS hatchback (facelift; front)

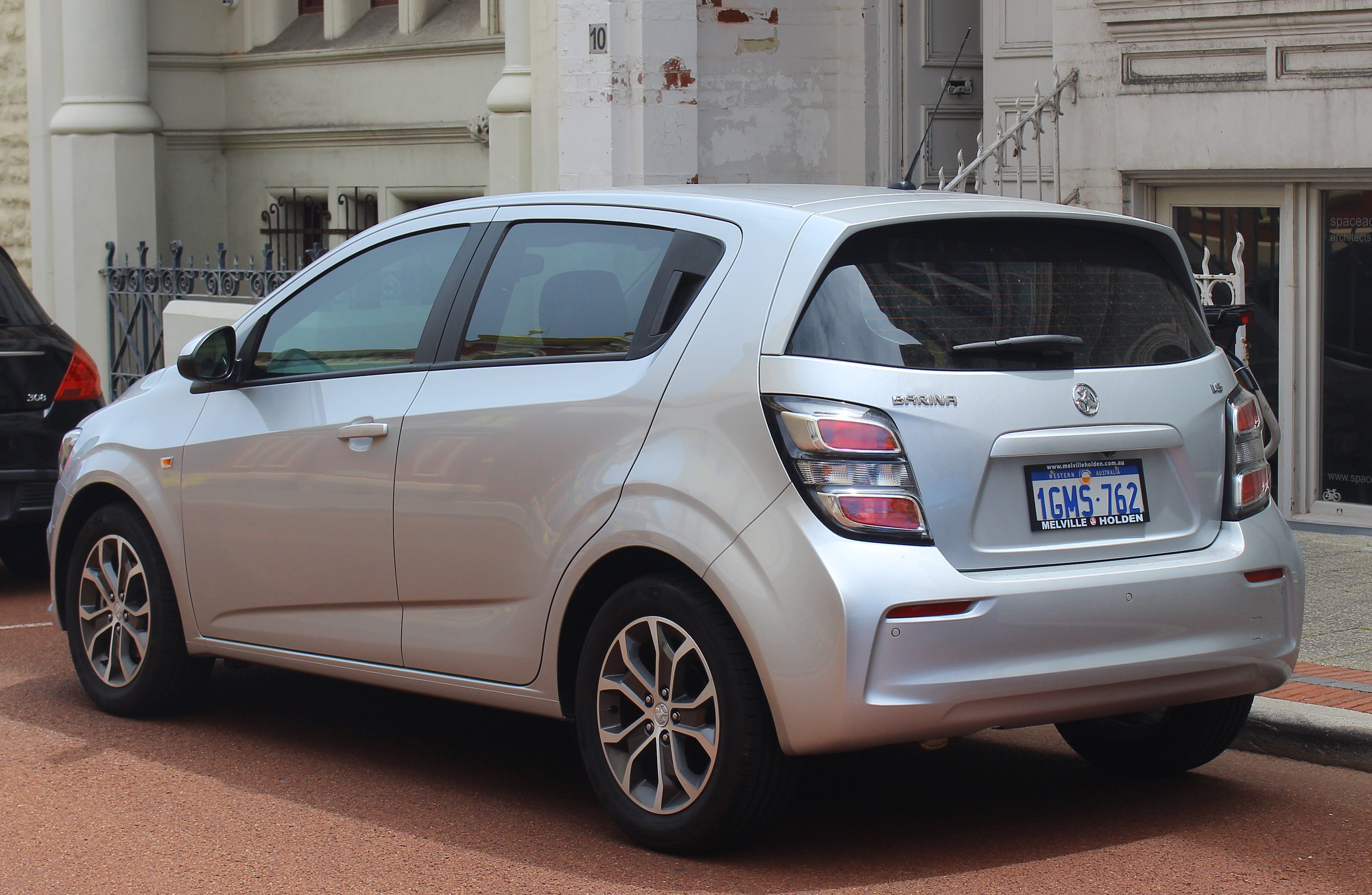
2018 Holden Barina (TM) LS hatchback (facelift; rear)

=== Safety ===
ANCAP test results* Holden Barina all TM series variants (2011)
Test	Score
Overall	5 /5 stars
Frontal offset	15.43/16
Side impact	16/16
Pole	2/2
Seat belt reminders	2/3
Whiplash protection	Not Assessed
Pedestrian protection	Marginal
Electronic stability control	Standard
