= Peter Hanenberger =

German-born automotive specialist (born 1942)

- Born: 1942 (age 83–84); Wiesbaden, Germany
- Occupation: Retired

Peter Hanenberger (born 1942 in Wiesbaden, West Germany) is a German-born automotive specialist who worked all 45 years of his professional career for General Motors (GM) and subsidiaries. At the age of 16, he joined GM as apprentice in the Opel technical development center in Rüsselsheim, Germany, and retired at the age of 61 at the end of 2003 as chairman and managing director of Australian GM subsidiary, Holden, having served in a number of managerial positions at Opel, Holden, and General Motors internationally.

== Beginnings ==
Peter spent most of his early career working for GM's Opel division in Germany as a vehicle tester and suspension engineer. In 1976 Hanenberger was approached by GM-Holden Australia to assist with suspension work on their vehicles, and with notice of a month from Opel, he was transferred there. During that year he assisted Holden with a new suspension tuning update for their cars, entitled RTS ("Radial Tuned Suspension"). Applied firstly to the Holden Sunbird, then to all other Holdens (and the Vauxhall Chevette in New Zealand), it transformed the overall handling dynamics of the entire Holden range for the better in Australian road conditions.

Well liked by the people at Holden for his genial and professional manner, Hanenberger left Australia to return to Opel in the early 1980s, becoming GM vice president and group executive of Opel's International Technical Development Centre (ITDC) in Rüsselsheim, Germany. In 1998, Hanenberger was in line to replace Gary Cowger as the head of Opel. However, the Opel supervisory board rejected Hanenberger and signaled that his contract won't be renewed.

== Holden ==
In 1999, it was announced that Hanenberger was to be the new chairman and managing director of Holden. On assignment with Holden in the 1970s, Hanenberger had assisted Holden engineers with their "European look" design briefs, and upon his return in 1999, he implemented quality control and improved production engineering principles.

After discovering that the prototype Holden Monaro had been built by a group of enthusiastic and dedicated Holden engineers in their free time, Hanenberger encouraged the development of the prototype into production-readiness, and sought out export markets to guarantee the car's production. Hanenberger also consolidated the maker's exports programmes of its VT Commodore/WH Statesman/Caprice platform, and the cars quickly became favorites in the Middle East, winning numerous motoring press awards. In 2003, he announced that he would retire, after spending about 45 years with GM.

== Retirement ==
Hanenberger retired to his home town of Wiesbaden. As a farewell gift from Holden, they made him a once only special Holden Monaro. It is left hand drive (for Europe), with a special Pontiac GTO LS1 V8 engine. There was also a HRT0001 Monaro coupe Hanenberger had built as a special order company car when he was Holden CEO. This was a black Monaro CV8 with the Callaway C4B 300 kW (400 hp) engine, GTO badging, unique interior trim, HSV brakes and HRT front and rear spoilers (same as HRT427) and was called "HRT Coupe 0001" this was the only "non-HSV" car to use a C4B engine.

In a 2017 interview with Carsales, Hanenberger recounted his unrealised projects at Holden, and blamed the car maker's decision to cease production on interference and poor management from GM global headquarters.

Business positions
Preceded by James R. Wiemels	Holden Chairman; 1999–2003	Succeeded by Denny Mooney
