= Mark Reuss =

American business executive

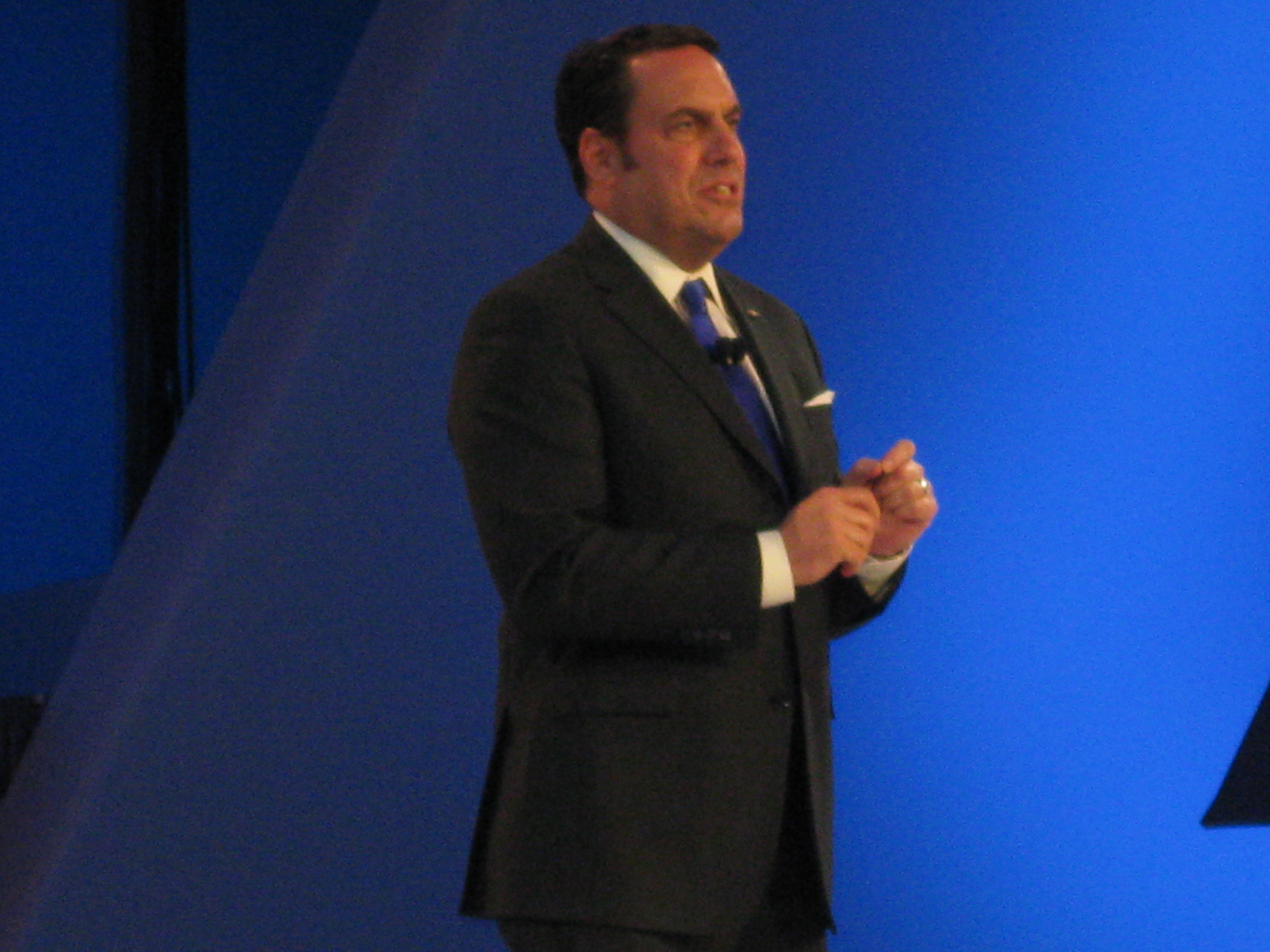
- Reuss in 2011
- Born: 1963 or 1964 (age 62–63); Michigan, U.S.
- Education: Vanderbilt University (BE); Duke University Fuqua School of Business (MBA)
- Employer: General Motors

Mark L. Reuss is an American engineer and businessman who is the current President of General Motors since 2019.

== Early life and education ==
Reuss was born and raised in Metro Detroit, and is the son of Lloyd E. Reuss, former president of GM from 1990 to 1992. Reuss studied mechanical engineering at Vanderbilt University, graduating with a Bachelor of Engineering degree in 1986. He received an MBA from Duke University's Fuqua School of Business in 1990.

== Career ==
In 2001, Reuss was appointed executive director of the Performance Division, then executive director of Global Vehicle Integration, Safety and Virtual Development in 2005, and held the position of President of General Motors North America from 2009 until 2013.

Later, he was chairman and managing director of Holden, the Australasian General Motors (GM) operation from February 1, 2008, until September 1, 2009, overseeing GM's Australasian operations and is a director on the GM Asia Pacific Strategy Board.

Reuss was the vehicle line executive in charge of the highly criticized and unsuccessful Pontiac Aztek and Buick Rendezvous. However, he was praised for his tenure in the early 2010s for leading product development.

From September 1, 2009, Alan Batey took over his position as Reuss returned to the GM in the United States as a senior product development director.

On June 3, 2018, Reuss crashed the Corvette ZR1 pace car that he was driving in the first corner of the first pace lap of the second race at the 2018 Detroit Grand Prix, leading to a lengthy delay, and unwanted publicity for Reuss and General Motors. Reuss and passenger Mark Sandy were uninjured.

One year later, he got back in the Pace car for the 2019 Race 1 of the Grand Prix in hard rain – and led the field without incident. He also debuted the new Cadillac V-series at the race in full camo. In 2020, he was the honorary pace car driver for the Indianapolis 500.

In October 2024, Mark Reuss drove the 2025 Chevrolet Corvette ZR1 to 233 mph, breaking the world record for the fastest production car under $1 million.

== Electric Corvette ==
On April 27, 2022, General Motors president Mark Reuss announced that it is developing "an electrified and a fully electric" version of its Chevrolet Corvette.

Business positions
Preceded by Chris Gubbey	Holden Chairman; 2008–2009	Succeeded by Alan Batey
Preceded by	President of General Motors; 2019–present	Succeeded by Incumbent
