= Chris Gubbey =

British businessman (born 1956)

Christopher P.M. Gubbey (born 11 May 1956 in Gosport, Hampshire, England) is an auto executive, who currently works for General Motors. Until 2007, Gubbey was the vice president of Shanghai GM. Gubbey is a graduate of Hatfield Polytechnic and has also held positions at Ford and Toyota. On 1 July 2007 he officially took up his role as chairman and managing director of Holden, however, after only six months as chairman and managing director, the shortest in the history of the company, Gubbey was replaced by Mark Reuss. Gubbey has since been appointed GME Vice President and managing director, GM Russia and Commonwealth of Independent States.

Business positions
Preceded by Denny Mooney	Holden Chairman; 2007–2008	Succeeded by Mark Reuss
