= Denny Mooney =

Dennis M. "Denny" Mooney (born 1956 in the United States) is a former General Motors (GM) executive. Mooney joined GM in 1978, and held positions such as head of the Buick-Cadillac-Oldsmobile N-car chassis development team, and executive director for vehicle performance at GM Engineering until September 2003. From there he spent four months preparing for his new role at Holden, until he was sworn in as chairman and managing director of the Australian-based automaker on January 1, 2004. On August 1, 2007, Mooney was promoted to vice president of GM global vehicle systems and integration, with Chris Gubbey taking up his former role at Holden.

Denny Mooney retired from GM on October 1, 2009. Shortly thereafter, he joined Navistar International Corporation as vice president of global engineering, where in December 2012 he was subsequently promoted to senior vice president, overseeing all global product development.

Business positions
Preceded by Peter Hanenberger	Holden Chairman; 2003–2007	Succeeded by Chris Gubbey
