= Holden =

Defunct Australian automobile manufacturer

GM Holden Ltd.

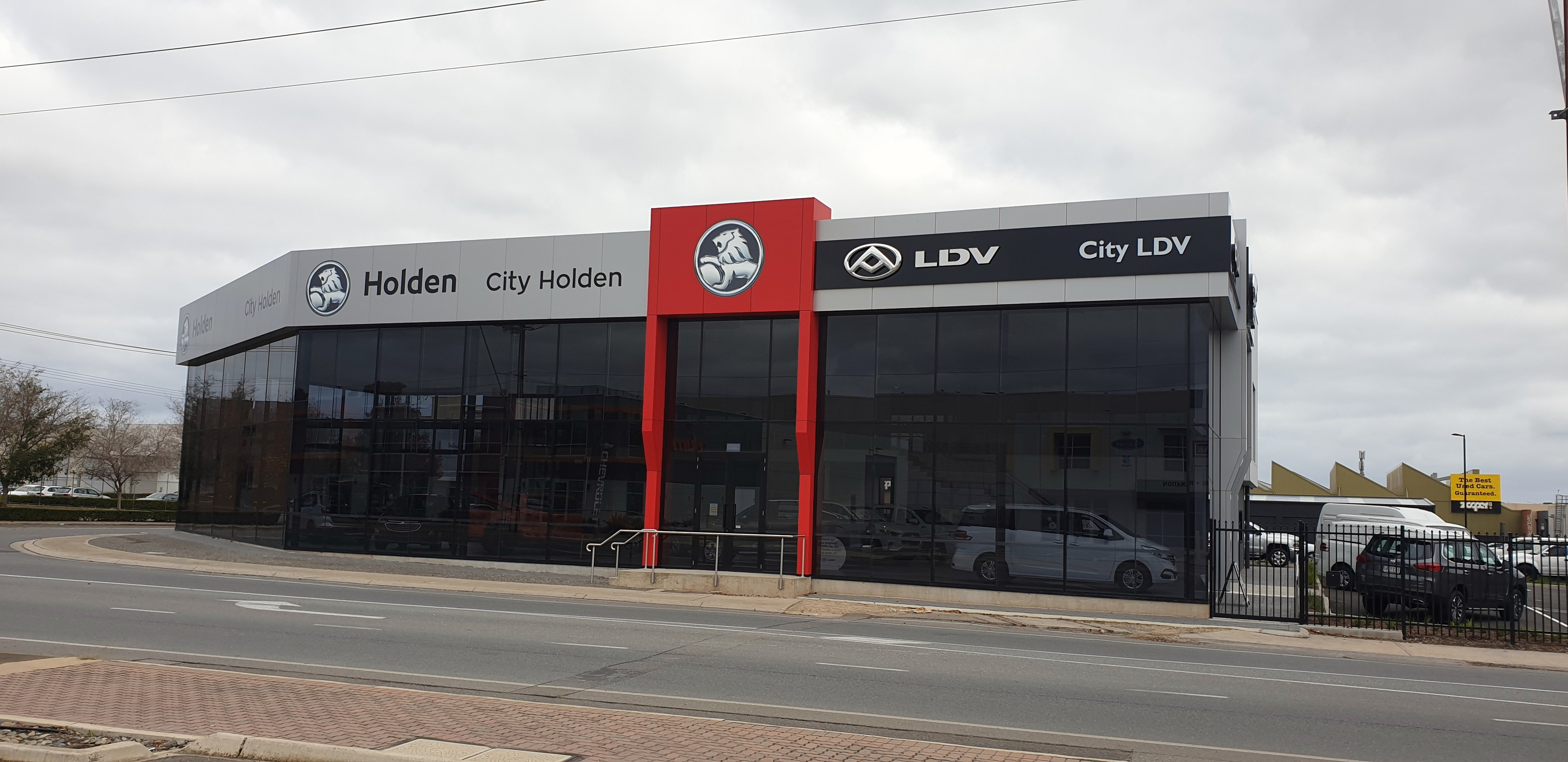
- Holden dealership in Mile End, South Australia, May 2020
- Trade name: Holden
- Type: Subsidiary
- Industry: Automotive
- Founded: 1856; 170 years ago (as J. A. Holden & Co) in Adelaide, South Australia
- Founders: James Alexander Holden (original firm); Sir Edward Holden
- Defunct: 1 January 2021; 5 years ago
- Fate: Holden marque discontinued; replaced by GM Specialty Vehicles
- Successor: GM Specialty Vehicles
- Headquarters: Port Melbourne, Victoria (head office); Elizabeth, South Australia (manufacturing operations)
- Area served: Australia & New Zealand
- Key people: Laurence Hartnett; Marc Ebolo
- Products: Automobiles
- Parent: General Motors
- Divisions: Holden Special Vehicles (50%)
- Website: holden.com.au

Holden, formerly known as General Motors-Holden, was an Australian subsidiary company of General Motors. Founded in Adelaide, it was an automobile manufacturer, importer, and exporter that sold cars under its own marque in Australia. It was headquartered in Port Melbourne, with major industrial operations in the states of South Australia and Victoria. The 164-year-old company ceased trading at the end of 2020, having switched to solely importing vehicles in its final three years.

Holden's primary products were its own models developed in-house, such as the Holden Commodore, Holden Caprice, and the Holden Ute. However, Holden also offered badge-engineered models under sharing arrangements with Nissan, Suzuki, Toyota, Isuzu, and then GM subsidiaries Opel, Vauxhall and Chevrolet. The vehicle lineup had included models from GM Korea, GM Thailand, and GM North America. Holden had also distributed GM's German Opel marque in Australia briefly from 2012 to 2013.

Holden was founded in 1856 as a saddlery manufacturer at the corner of King William Street and Rundle Street in Adelaide, before moving into the automotive field in 1898. It became a subsidiary of the United States–based General Motors (GM) in 1931, when the company was renamed General Motors-Holden's Ltd. It was renamed Holden Ltd in 1998 and adopted the name GM Holden Ltd in 2005.

Holden briefly owned assembly plants in New Zealand during the early 1990s. The plants had belonged to General Motors from 1926 until 1990 in an earlier and quite separate operation from GM's Holden operations in Australia. Holden's production became increasingly concentrated in South Australia and Victoria after World War II. However, Holden had factories in all five mainland states of Australia when GM took over in 1931, due to the combining of Holden and GM factories around the country under Holden management. In the postwar period, this decentralisation was slowly reduced and, by 1989, the consolidation of final assembly at Elizabeth in South Australia was largely completed, except for some operations that continued at Dandenong until 1994. Engine manufacturing was consolidated at Fishermans Bend, which was expanded to supply markets overseas.

Although Holden's involvement in exports had fluctuated from the 1950s, the declining sales of large sedan cars in Australia led the company to look to international markets to increase profitability. In 2013, Holden revealed it received A$2.17 billion in federal government assistance in the past 12 years, which was much more than estimated. Holden blamed a strong Australian currency, high manufacturing costs and a small domestic market among the reasons for exit of local manufacturing. The Australian population also blamed GM's consistent mishandling of rebadging Holden's lineup leading to a lack of Australian identity and internal company competition, decreasing the brand recognition and desirability of Holden in its domestic market. This led to the announcement, on 11 December 2013, that Holden would cease vehicle and engine production by the end of 2017.

On 29 November 2016, engine production at the Fishermans Bend plant was shut down. On 20 October 2017, the last Australian-manufactured Holden Commodore was produced, and the Elizabeth plant was shut down. Holden produced nearly 7.7 million vehicles. On 17 February 2020, General Motors announced that the Holden marque would be retired by 2021. On 30 October 2020, the GM Australia Design Studio at Fishermans Bend was shut down. Holden has been replaced by GM Specialty Vehicles (GMSV), which imports the Chevrolet Silverado and the Chevrolet Corvette.

== History ==
=== Early history ===
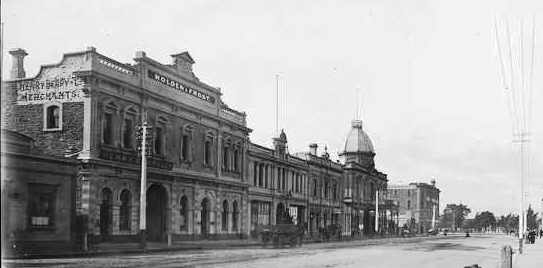
Holden & Frost premises on Grenfell Street

In 1852, James Alexander Holden emigrated to South Australia from Walsall, Staffordshire, England and, in 1856, established J. A. Holden & Co., a saddlery business in Adelaide. In 1879, J. A. Holden's eldest son Henry James Holden, became a partner and effectively managed the company. In 1885, German-born Henry Adolph Frost joined the business as a junior partner and J. A. Holden & Co. became Holden & Frost Ltd. Edward Holden, James's grandson, joined the firm in 1905 with an interest in automobiles. From there, the firm evolved through various partnerships, and in 1908, Holden & Frost moved into the business of minor repairs to car upholstery. The company began to re-body older chassis using motor bodies produced by F. T. Hack and Co from 1914. Holden & Frost mounted the body, and painted and trimmed it. The company began to produce complete motorcycle sidecar bodies after 1913. After 1917, wartime trade restrictions led the company to start full-scale production of vehicle body shells. H. J. Holden founded a new company in late 1917, and registered Holden's Motor Body Builders Ltd (HMBB) on 25 February 1919, specialising in car bodies and using the former F. T. Hack & Co. facility at 400 King William Street in Adelaide before erecting a large four-storey factory on the site.

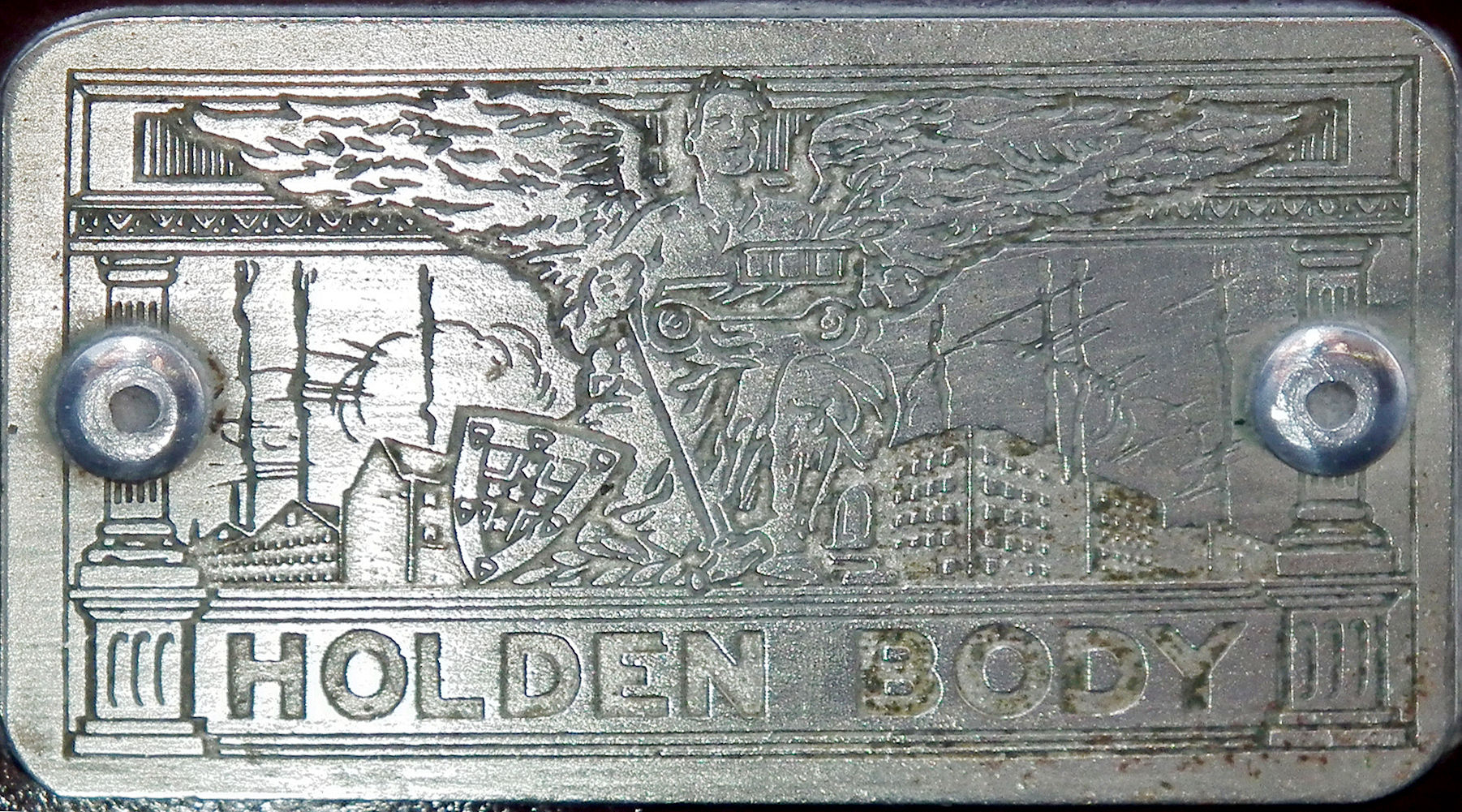
Holden Body badge on a 1928 Chevrolet Tourer

By 1923, HMBB were producing 12,000 units per year. During this time, HMBB assembled bodies for Ford Motor Company of Australia until its Geelong plant was completed. From 1924, HMBB became the exclusive supplier of car bodies for GM in Australia, with manufacturing taking place at the new Holden Woodville Plant (which was actually in the adjacent suburb of Cheltenham). These bodies were made to suit a number of chassis imported from manufacturers including Austin, Buick, Chevrolet, Cleveland, Dodge, Essex, Fiat, Hudson, Oakland, Oldsmobile, Overland, Reo, Studebaker and Willys-Knight.

In 1926, General Motors (Australia) Limited was established with assembly plants at Newstead, Queensland; Marrickville, New South Wales; City Road, Melbourne, Victoria; Birkenhead, South Australia; and Cottesloe, Western Australia using bodies produced by HMBB and imported complete knock down chassis. In 1930 alone, the still independent Woodville plant built bodies for Austin, Chrysler, DeSoto, Morris, Hillman, Humber, Hupmobile and Willys-Overland, as well as GM cars. The last of this line of business was the assembly of Hillman Minx sedans in 1948. The Great Depression led to a substantial downturn in production by Holden, from 34,000 units annually in 1930 to just 1,651 units one year later. In 1931, GM purchased HMBB and merged it with General Motors (Australia) Pty Ltd to form General Motors-Holden's Ltd (GM-H). Its acquisition of Holden allowed General Motors to inherit an Australian identity, which it used to cultivate nationalist appeal for the firm, largely through the use of public relations, a then novel form of business communication which was imported to Australia through the formation of General Motors (Australia) Limited. Throughout the 1920s, Holden also supplied 60 W-class tramcar bodies to the Melbourne & Metropolitan Tramways Board, of which several examples have been preserved in both Australia and New Zealand.

=== 1940s ===
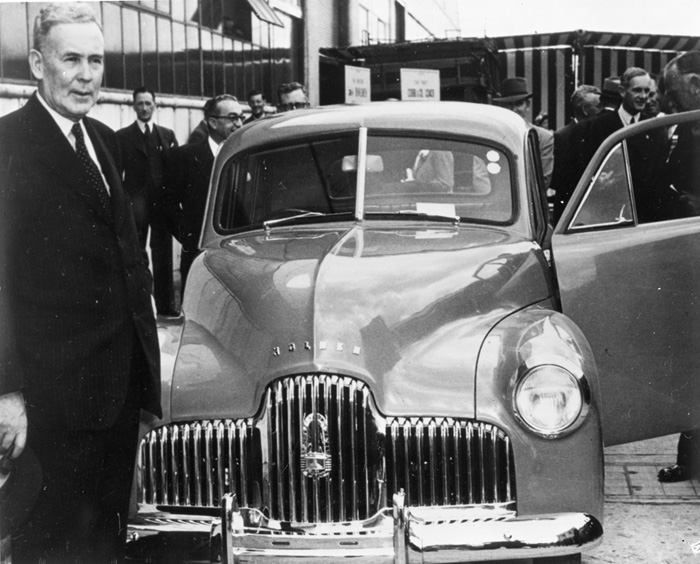
Prime Minister Ben Chifley at the launching of the Holden 48-215 on 29 November 1948

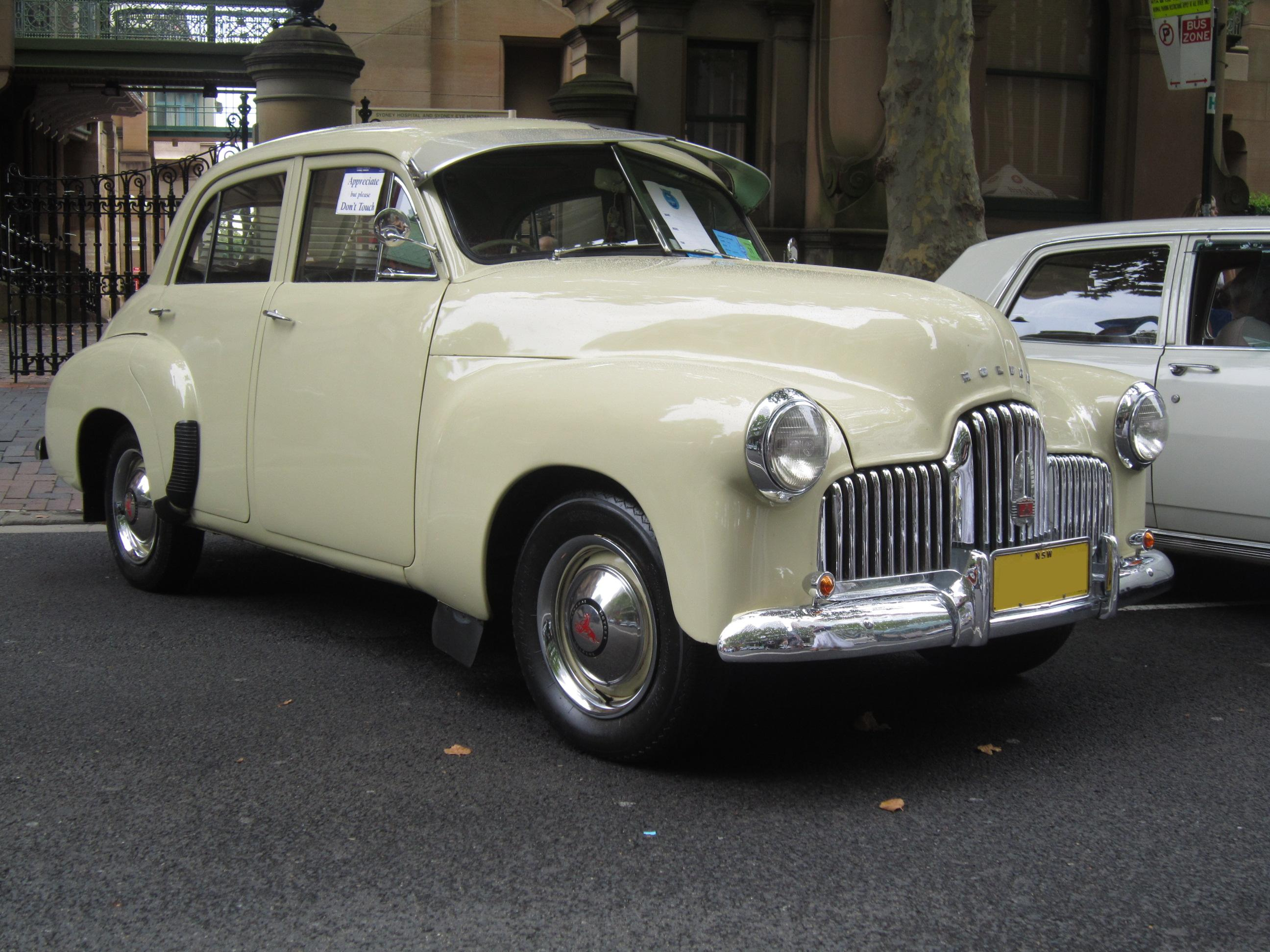
The Holden 48-215 was the company's first wholly domestically produced model, when introduced in 1948.

Holden's second full-scale car factory, located in Fishermans Bend (Port Melbourne), was opened on 5 November 1936 by Prime Minister Joseph Lyons, with construction beginning in 1939 on a new plant in Pagewood, New South Wales. However, World War II delayed car production with efforts shifted to the construction of vehicle bodies, field guns, aircraft, and engines. Before the war ended, the Australian government took steps to encourage an Australian automotive industry. Both GM and Ford provided studies to the Australian government outlining the production of the first Australian-designed car. Ford's proposal was the government's first choice, but required substantial financial assistance. GM's study was ultimately chosen because of its low level of government intervention. After the war, Holden returned to producing vehicle bodies, this time for Buick, Chevrolet, Pontiac, and Vauxhall. The Oldsmobile Ace was also produced from 1946 to 1948.

From here, Holden continued to pursue the goal of producing an Australian car. This involved compromise with GM, as Holden's managing director, Laurence Hartnett, favoured development of a local design, while GM preferred to see an American design as the basis for "Australia's Own Car". In the end, the design was based on a previously rejected postwar Chevrolet proposal. The Holden was launched in 1948, creating long waiting lists extending through 1949 and beyond. The name "Holden" was chosen in honour of Sir Edward Holden, the company's first chairman and grandson of J. A. Holden. Other names considered were "GeM", "Austral", "Melba", "Woomerah", "Boomerang", "Emu", and "Canbra", a phonetic spelling of Canberra. Although officially designated "48-215", the car was marketed simply as the "Holden". The unofficial usage of the name "FX" originated within Holden, referring to the updated suspension on the 48–215 of 1953.

=== 1950s ===
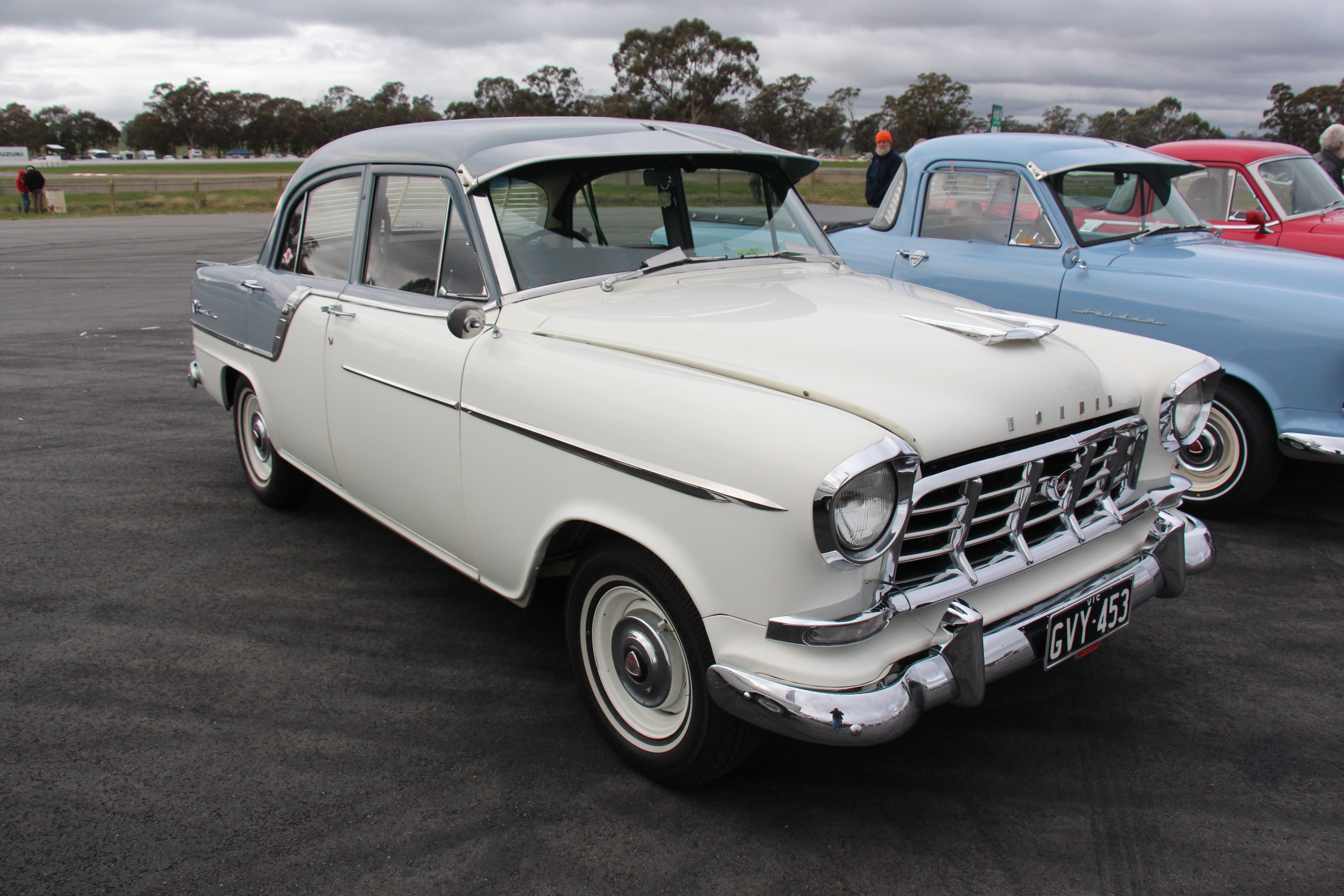
The Holden FC was the first to be tested at the Lang Lang Proving Ground.

During the 1950s, Holden dominated the Australian car market. GM invested heavily in production capacity, which allowed the company to meet increased postwar demand for motor cars. Less expensive, four-cylinder cars did not offer Holdens the ability to deal with rugged rural areas. Holden 48–215 sedans were produced in parallel with the 50-2106 coupé utility from 1951; the latter was known colloquially as the "ute" and became ubiquitous in Australian rural areas as the workhorse of choice. Production of both the utility and sedan continued with minor changes until 1953, when they were replaced by the facelifted FJ model, introducing a third panel van body style. The FJ was the first major change to the Holden since its 1948 introduction. Over time, it gained iconic status and remains one of Australia's most recognisable automotive symbols. A new horizontally slatted grille dominated the front end of the FJ, which received various other trim and minor mechanical revisions. In 1954, Holden began exporting the FJ to New Zealand. Although little changed from the 48–215, marketing campaigns and price cuts kept FJ sales steady until a completely redesigned model was launched. At the 2005 Australian International Motor Show in Sydney, Holden paid homage to the FJ with the Efijy concept car. Commercial success underpinned the rise of Holden as a cultural icon, as the Holden car became synonymous with the 'Australian way of life', coming to symbolise the stability of post-war Australian capitalism.

Holden's next model, the FE, launched in 1956, offered in a new station wagon body style dubbed "Station Sedan" in the company's sales literature. In the same year, Holden commenced exports to Malaya, Thailand, and North Borneo. Strong sales continued in Australia, and Holden achieved a market share of more than 50% in 1958 with the revised FC model. This was the first Holden to be tested on the new Lang Lang Proving Ground in Lang Lang, Victoria. In 1957, Holden's export markets grew to 17 countries, with new additions including Indonesia, Hong Kong, Singapore, Fiji, Sudan, the East Africa region, and South Africa. Indonesian market cars were assembled locally by P. T. Udatin. The opening of the Dandenong plant in 1956 brought further jobs; by 1959, Holden employed 19,000 workers country-wide. In 1959, complete knock-down assembly began in South Africa and Indonesia.

=== 1960s ===
In 1960, Holden introduced its third major new model, the FB. The car's style was inspired by 1950s Chevrolets, with tailfins and a wrap-around windscreen with "dog leg" A-pillars. By the time it was introduced, many considered the appearance dated. Much of the motoring industry at the time noted that the adopted style did not translate well to the more compact Holden. The FB became the first Holden that was adapted for left-hand drive markets, enhancing its export potential, and as such was exported to New Caledonia, New Hebrides, the Philippines, and Hawaii.

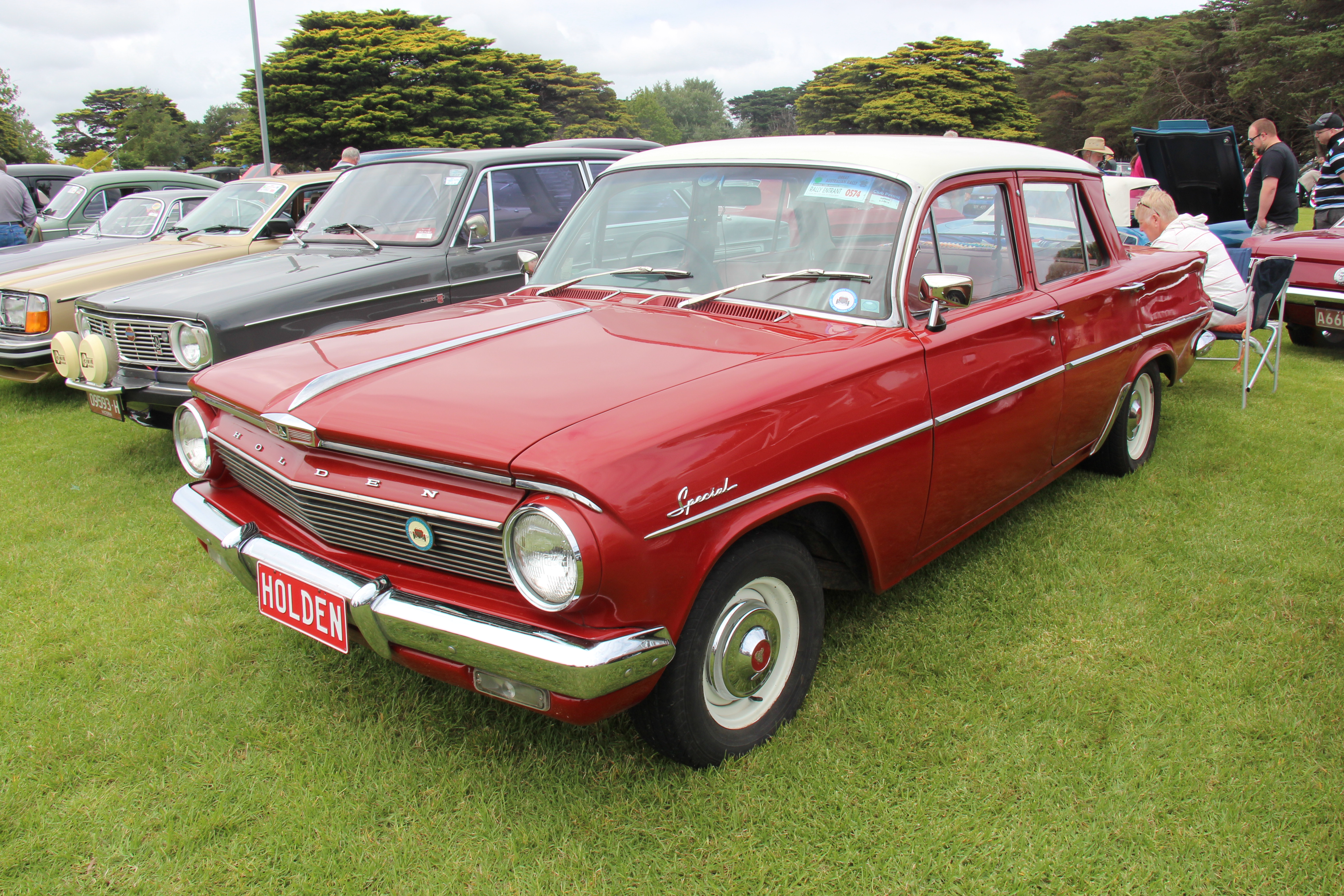
Holden's one-millionth model was an EJ series, produced on 26 October 1962.

In 1960, Ford unveiled the new Falcon in Australia, only months after its introduction in the United States. To Holden's advantage, the Falcon was not durable, particularly in the front suspension, making it ill-suited for Australian conditions. In response to the Falcon, Holden introduced the facelifted EK series in 1961; the new model featured two-tone paintwork and optional Hydramatic automatic transmission. A restyled EJ series came in 1962, debuting the new luxury oriented Premier model. The EH update came a year later, bringing the new Red motor, providing better performance than the previous Grey motor. The HD series of 1965 had the introduction of the Powerglide automatic transmission. At the same time, an "X2" performance option with a more powerful version of the 179-cubic-inch (2.9 L) six-cylinder engine was made available. In 1966, the HR was introduced, including changes in the form of new front and rear styling and higher-capacity engines. More significantly, the HR fitted standard front seat belts; Holden thus became the first Australian automaker to provide the safety device as standard equipment across all models. This coincided with the completion of the Acacia Ridge Plant. By 1963, Holden was exporting cars to Africa, the Middle East, Southeast Asia, the Pacific Islands, and the Caribbean.

Holden began assembling the compact HA series Vauxhall Viva in 1964. This was superseded by the Holden Torana in 1967, a development of the Viva ending Vauxhall production in Australia. Holden offered the LC, a Torana with new styling, in 1969 with the availability of Holden's six-cylinder engine. In the development days, the six-cylinder Torana was reserved for motor racing, but research had shown a business case existed for such a model. The LC Torana was the first application of Holden's new three-speed Tri-Matic automatic transmission. This was the result of Holden's A$16.5 million transformation of the Woodville, South Australia, factory for its production.

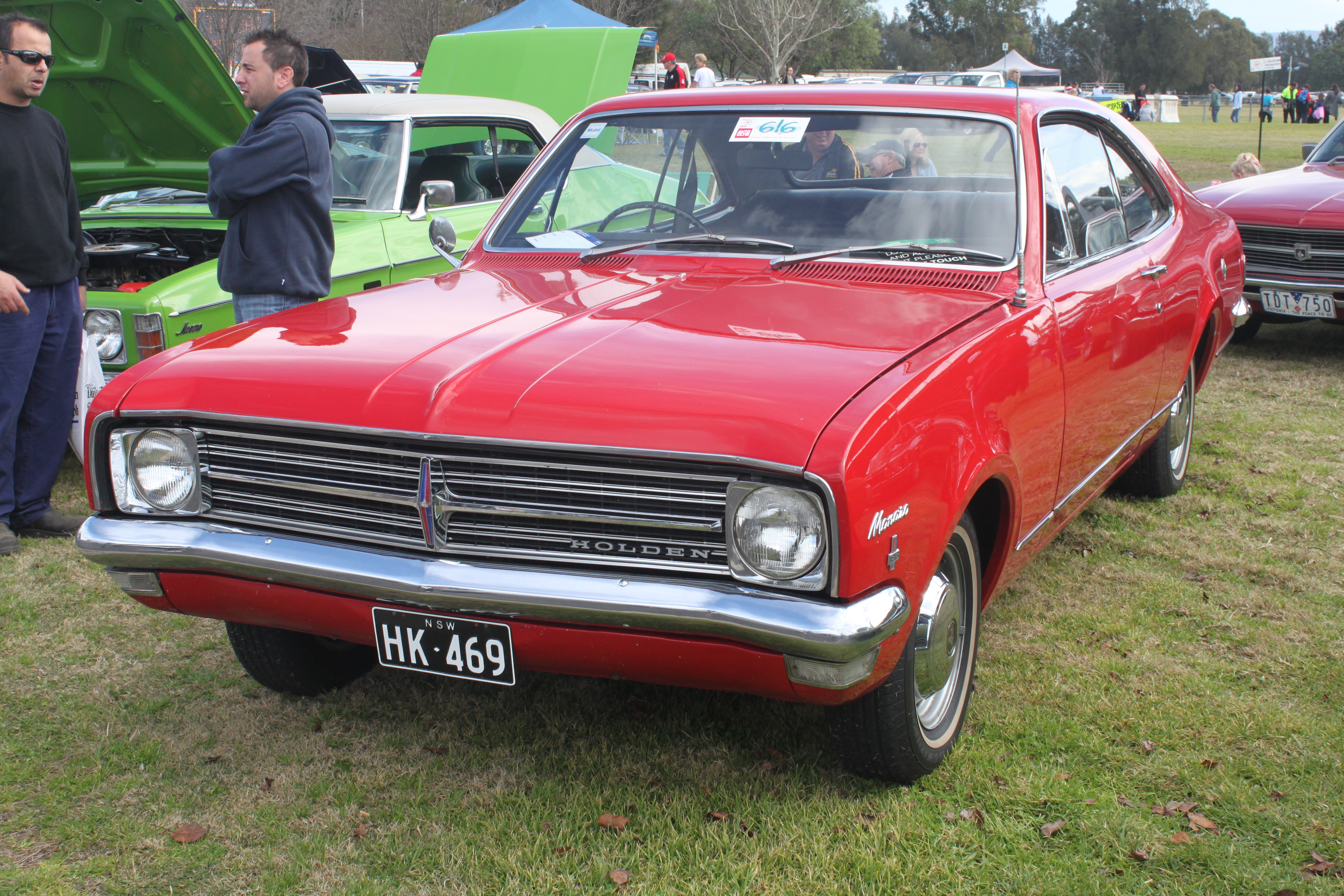
The celebrated Holden Monaro coupé, introduced in 1968 and based on the mainstream Kingswood, has since gained a cult following.

Holden's association with the manufacture of Chevrolets and Pontiacs ended in 1968, coinciding with the year of Holden's next major new model, the HK. This included Holden's first V8 engine, a Chevrolet engine imported from Canada. Models based on the HK series included an extended-length prestige model, the Brougham; and a two-door coupé, the Monaro. The mainstream Holden Special was rebranded the Kingswood, and the basic fleet model, the Standard, became the Belmont. On 3 March 1969, Alexander Rhea, managing director of General Motors-Holden's at the time, was joined by press photographers and the Federal Minister of Shipping and Transport, Ian Sinclair as the two men drove the two-millionth Holden, an HK Brougham, off the production line. This came just over half a decade since the one-millionth car, an EJ Premier sedan, rolled off the Dandenong line on 25 October 1962. Following the Chevrolet V8 fitted to the HK, the first Australian-designed and mass-produced V8, the Holden V8 engine debuted in the Hurricane concept of 1969 before fitment to facelifted HT model. This was available in two capacities: 253 and 308 cubic inches (4.1 and 5.0 L). Late in HT production, use of the new Tri-Matic automatic transmission, first seen in the LC Torana was phased in as Powerglide stock was exhausted, but Holden's official line was that the HG of 1971 was the first full-sized Holden to receive it.

Despite the arrival of serious competitors – namely, the Ford Falcon, Chrysler Valiant, and Japanese cars – in the 1960s, Holden's locally produced large six- and eight-cylinder cars remained Australia's top-selling vehicles. Sales were boosted by exporting the Kingswood sedan, station wagon, and utility body styles to Indonesia, Trinidad and Tobago, Pakistan, the Philippines, and South Africa in complete knock-down form.

=== 1970s ===
Holden launched the new HQ series in 1971. At this time, the company was producing all of its passenger cars in Australia, and every model was of Australian design; however, by the end of the decade, Holden was producing cars based on overseas designs. The HQ was thoroughly re-engineered, featuring a perimeter frame and semi-monocoque (unibody) construction. Other firsts included an all-coil suspension and an extended wheelbase for station wagons, while the utilities and panel vans retained the traditional coil/leaf suspension configuration. The series included the new prestige Statesman brand, which also had a longer wheelbase, replacing the Brougham. The Statesman remains noteworthy because it was not marketed as a "Holden", but rather a "Statesman".

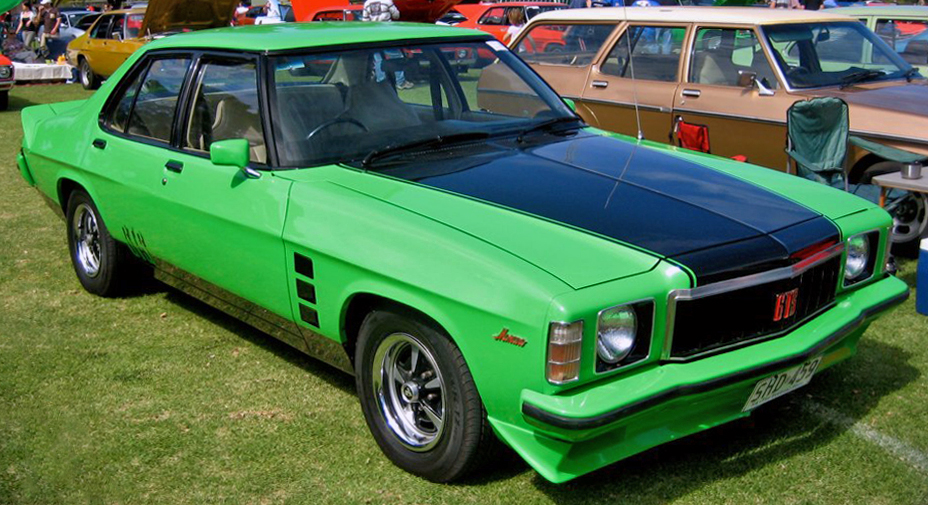
The Holden HX was an evolution of the record-selling HQ, with more than 480,000 units shifted throughout the car's lifetime.

The HQ framework led to a new generation of two-door Monaros, and despite the introduction of the similar-sized competitors, the HQ range became the top-selling Holden of all time, with 485,650 units sold in three years; 14,558 units were exported and 72,290 CKD kits were constructed. The HQ series was facelifted in 1974 with the introduction of the HJ, heralding new front-panel styling and a revised rear fascia. This new bodywork was to remain, albeit with minor upgrades, through the HX and HZ series. Detuned engines adhering to government emission standards were brought in with the HX series, whilst the HZ brought considerably improved road handling and comfort with the introduction of radial-tuned suspension. As a result of GM's toying with the Wankel rotary engine, as used by Mazda of Japan, an export agreement was initiated in 1975. This involved Holden exporting with powertrains, HJ, and later, HX series Premiers as the Mazda Roadpacer AP. Mazda then fitted these cars with the 13B rotary engine and three-speed automatic transmission. Production ended in 1977, after just 840 units sold.

Development of the Torana continued in with the larger mid-sized LH series released in 1974, offered only as a four-door sedan. The LH Torana was one of the few cars worldwide engineered to accommodate four-, six-, and eight-cylinder engines. This trend continued until Holden introduced the Sunbird in 1976, essentially the four-cylinder Torana with a new name. Designated LX, both the Sunbird and Torana introduced a three-door hatchback variant. A final UC update appeared in 1978. During its production run, the Torana achieved legendary racing success in Australia, achieving victories at the Mount Panorama Circuit in Bathurst, New South Wales.

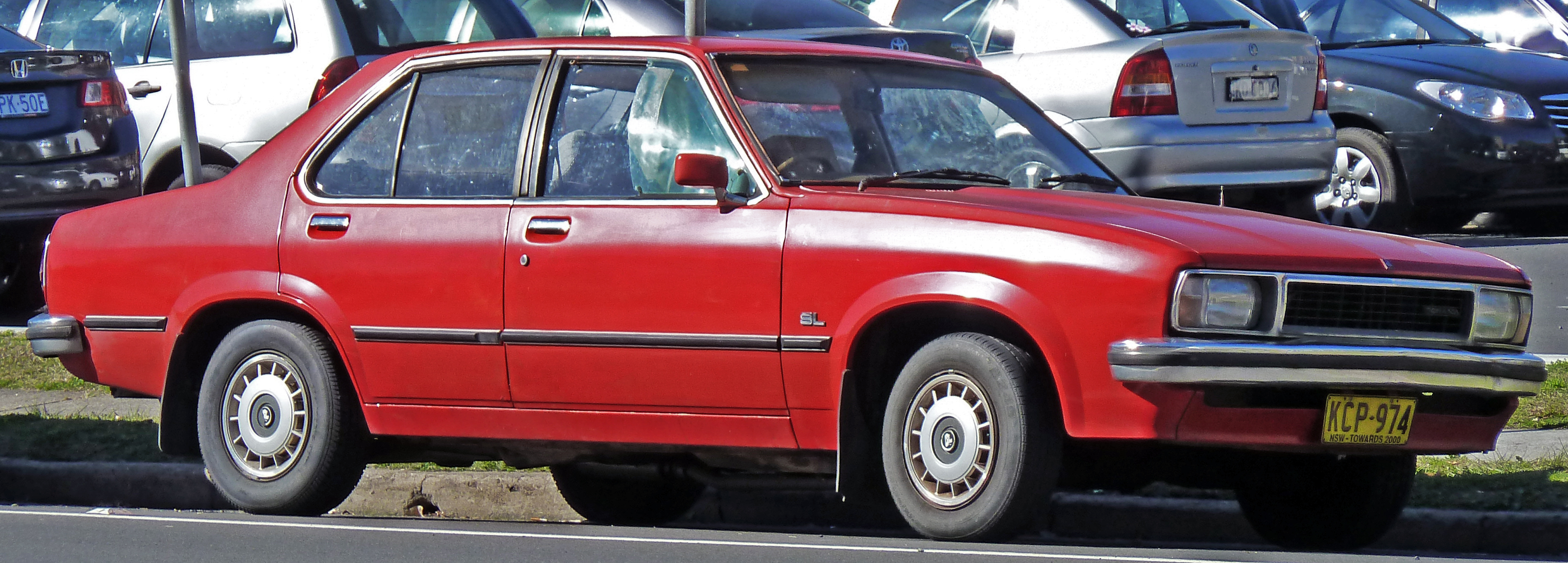
The UC, Holden's final iteration of the Torana, was replaced by an interim four-cylinder version of the Commodore until the Camira was launched in 1982.

In 1975, Holden introduced the compact Gemini, the Australian version of the "T-car", based on the Opel Kadett C. The Gemini was an overseas design developed jointly with Isuzu, GM's Japanese affiliate; and was powered by a 1.6-litre four-cylinder engine. Fast becoming a popular car, the Gemini rapidly attained sales leadership in its class, and the nameplate lived on until 1987.

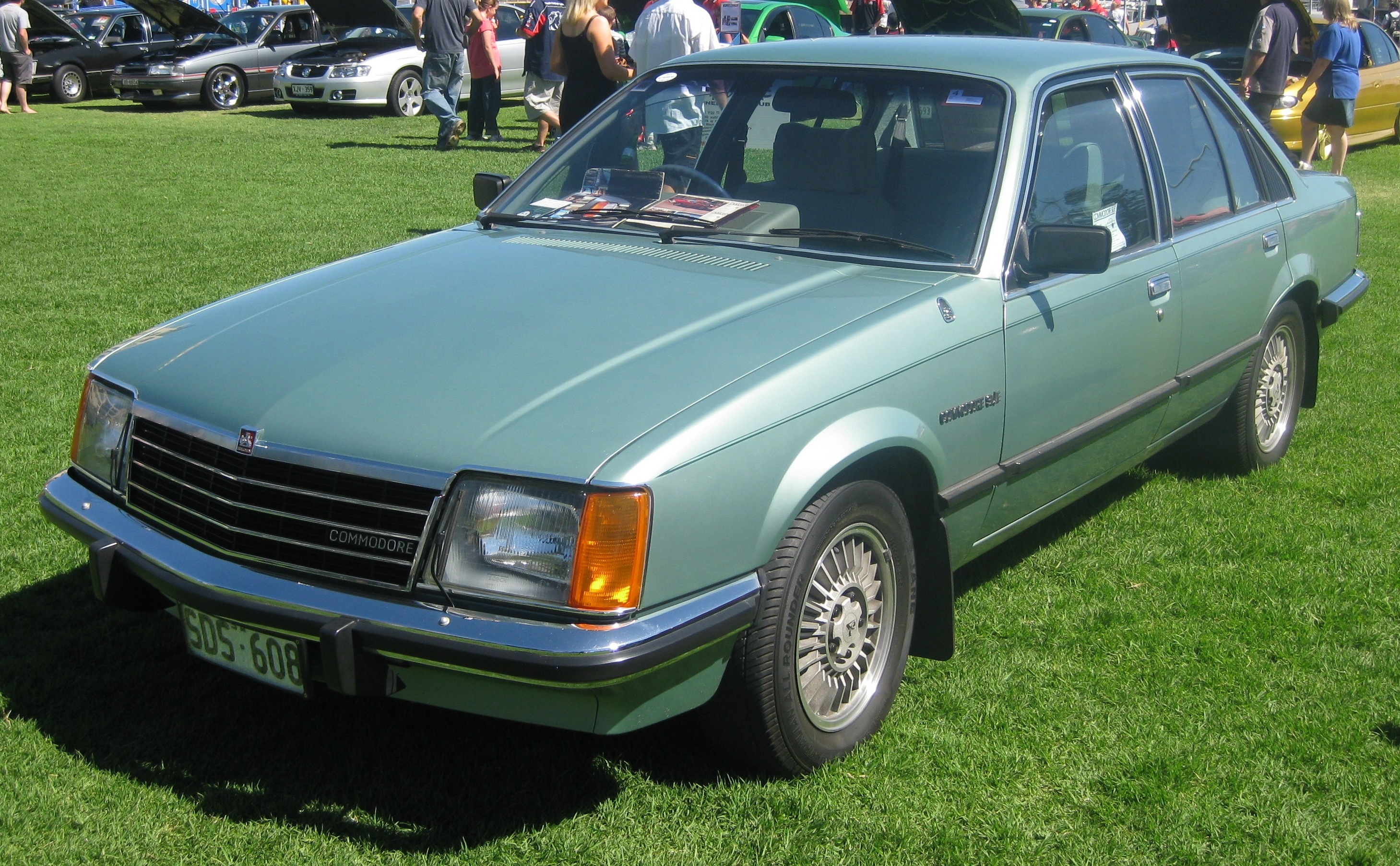
The Commodore was introduced in 1978, following the success of its Kingswood forebear. It would become Holden's bestselling vehicle to date.

Holden's most popular car to date, the Commodore, was introduced in 1978 as the VB. The new family car was loosely based on the Opel Rekord E body shell, but with the front from the Opel Senator grafted to accommodate the larger Holden six-cylinder and V8 engines. Initially, the Commodore maintained Holden's sales leadership in Australia. However, some of the compromises resulting from the adoption of a design intended for another market hampered the car's acceptance. In particular, it was narrower than its predecessor and its Falcon rival, making it less comfortable for three rear-seat passengers. With the abandonment of left-hand drive markets, Holden exported almost 100,000 Commodores to markets such as New Zealand, Thailand, Hong Kong, Malaysia, Indonesia, Malta and Singapore.

During the 1970s, Holden ran an advertising jingle "Football, Meat Pies, Kangaroos, and Holden cars", a localised version of the "Baseball, Hot Dogs, Apple Pies, and Chevrolet" jingle used by GM's Chevrolet division in the United States.

Holden discontinued the Torana in 1979 and the Sunbird in 1980. After the 1978 introduction of the Commodore, the Torana became the "in-between" car, surrounded by the smaller and more economical Gemini and the larger, more sophisticated Commodore. The closest successor to the Torana was the Camira, released in 1982 as Australia's version of GM's medium-sized "J-car".

=== 1980s ===
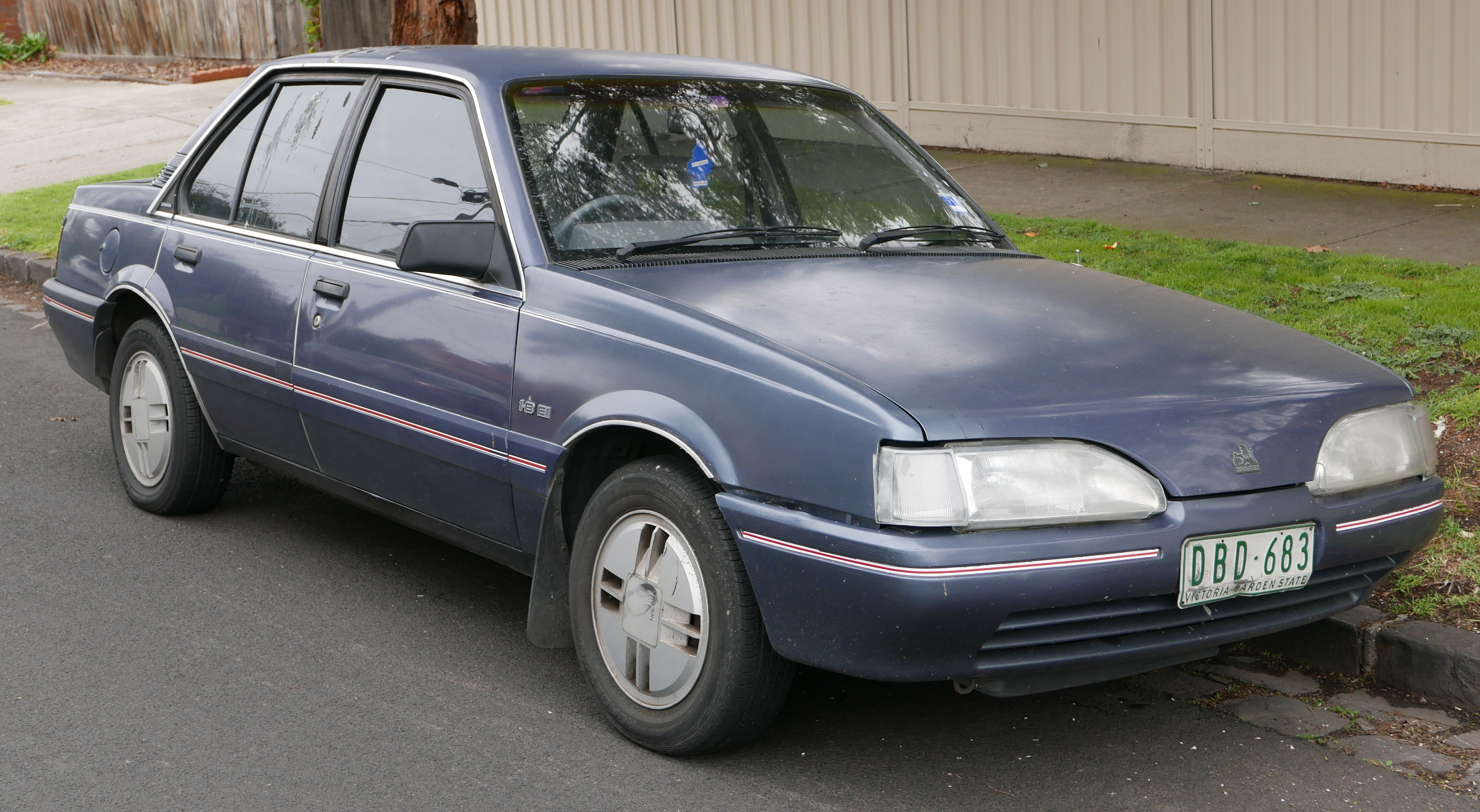
After a successful start, sales of the Camira, Holden's version of the global "J-car" platform slumped significantly. This placed a huge financial burden on the Australian subsidiary, which was already operating at a loss at this time.

The 1980s were challenging for Holden and the Australian automotive industry. The Australian Government tried to revive the industry with the Button car plan, which encouraged car makers to focus on producing fewer models at higher, more economical volumes, and to export cars. The decade opened with the shut-down of the Pagewood, New South Wales production plant and introduction of the light commercial Rodeo, sourced from Isuzu in Japan. The Rodeo was available in both two- and four-wheel drive chassis cab models with a choice of petrol and diesel powerplants. The range was updated in 1988 with the TF series, based on the Isuzu TF. Other cars sourced from Isuzu during the 1980s were the four-wheel drive Jackaroo (1981), the Shuttle (1982) van and the Piazza (1986) three-door sports hatchback. The second generation Holden Gemini from 1985 was also based on an Isuzu design, although, its manufacture was undertaken in Australia.

In 1981, the Fishermans Bend engine plant began production of the Family II – part of a global engine program for GM's compact vehicles. The plant supplied the engine locally for the Camira model, and to export markets – mainly to GM's plants in Europe for installation in Opel/Vauxhall vehicles.

While GM Australia's commercial vehicle range had originally been mostly based on Bedford products, these had gradually been replaced by Isuzu products as the Bedford brand was being retired in Britain. This process began in the 1970s and by 1982 Holden's commercial vehicle arm no longer offered any Bedford products.

The new Holden WB commercial vehicles and the Statesman WB limousines were introduced in 1980. However, the designs, based on the HQ and updated HJ, HX and HZ models from the 1970s were less competitive than similar models in Ford's lineup. Thus, Holden abandoned those vehicle classes altogether in 1984. Sales of the Commodore also fell, with the effects of the 1979 energy crisis lessening, and for the first time the Commodore lost ground to the Ford Falcon. Sales in other segments also suffered when competition from Ford intensified, and other Australian manufacturers: Mitsubishi, Nissan and Toyota gained market share. When released in 1982, the Camira initially generated good sales, which later declined because buyers considered the 1.6-litre engine underpowered, and the car's build and ride quality below average. The Camira lasted just seven years, and contributed to Holden's accumulated losses of over A$500 million by the mid-1980s.

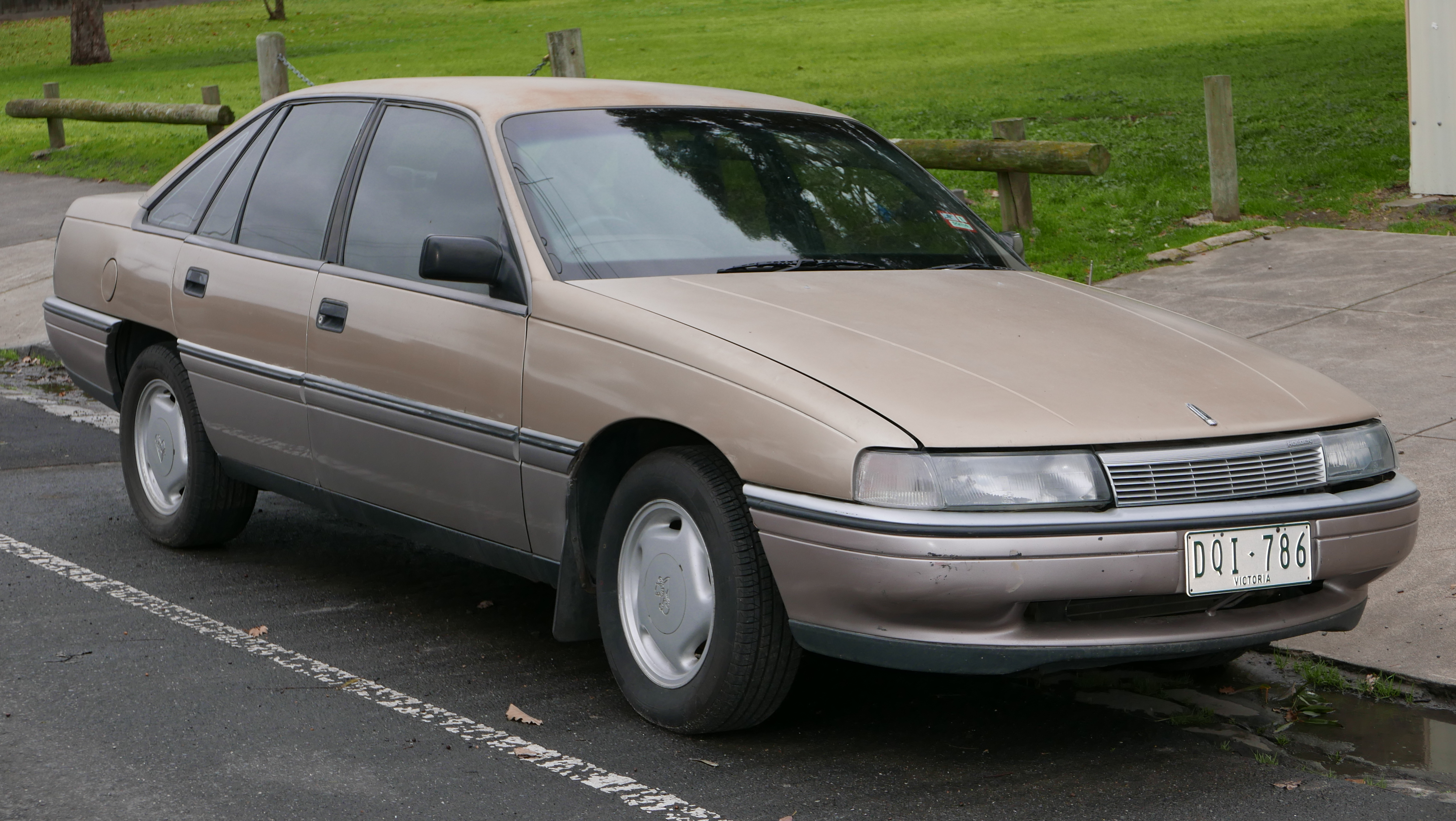
The second generation Commodore (VN Calais pictured) overcame the previous generation's width problems.

In 1984, Holden introduced the VK Commodore, with significant styling changes from the previous VH. The Commodore was next updated in 1986 as the VL, which had new front and rear styling. Controversially, the VL was powered by the 3.0-litre Nissan RB30 six-cylinder engine and had a Nissan-built, electronically controlled four-speed automatic transmission. Holden even went to court in 1984 to stop local motoring magazine Wheels from reporting on the matter. The engine change was necessitated by the legal requirement that all new cars sold in Australia after 1986 had to consume unleaded petrol. Because it was unfeasible to convert the existing six-cylinder engine to run on unleaded fuel, the Nissan engine was chosen as the best engine available. However, changing currency exchange rates doubled the cost of the engine and transmission over the life of the VL. The decision to opt for a Japanese-made transmission led to the closure of the Woodville, South Australia assembly plant. Emboldened by the apparent sign of turnaround, GM paid off Holden's mounted losses of A$780 million on 19 December 1986. At GM headquarters' request, Holden was then reorganised and recapitalised, separating the engine and car manufacturing divisions in the process. This involved the splitting of Holden into Holden's Motor Company (HMC) and Holden's Engine Company (HEC). For the most part, car bodies were now manufactured at Elizabeth, with engines as before, confined to the Fishermans Bend plant in Port Melbourne, Victoria. The engine manufacturing business was successful, building four-cylinder Family II engines for use in cars built overseas. The final phase of the Commodore's recovery strategy involved the 1988 VN, a significantly wider model powered by the American-designed, Australian-assembled 3.8-litre Buick V6 engine.

Holden began to sell the subcompact Suzuki Swift-based Barina in 1985. The Barina was launched concurrently with the Suzuki-sourced Holden Drover, followed by the Scurry later on in 1985. In the previous year, Nissan Pulsar hatchbacks were rebadged as the Holden Astra, as a result of a deal with Nissan. This arrangement ceased in 1989 when Holden entered a new alliance with Toyota, forming a new company: United Australian Automobile Industries (UAAI). UAAI resulted in Holden selling rebadged versions of Toyota's Corolla and Camry, as the Holden Nova and Apollo respectively, with Toyota re-branding the Commodore as the Lexcen.

=== 1990s ===
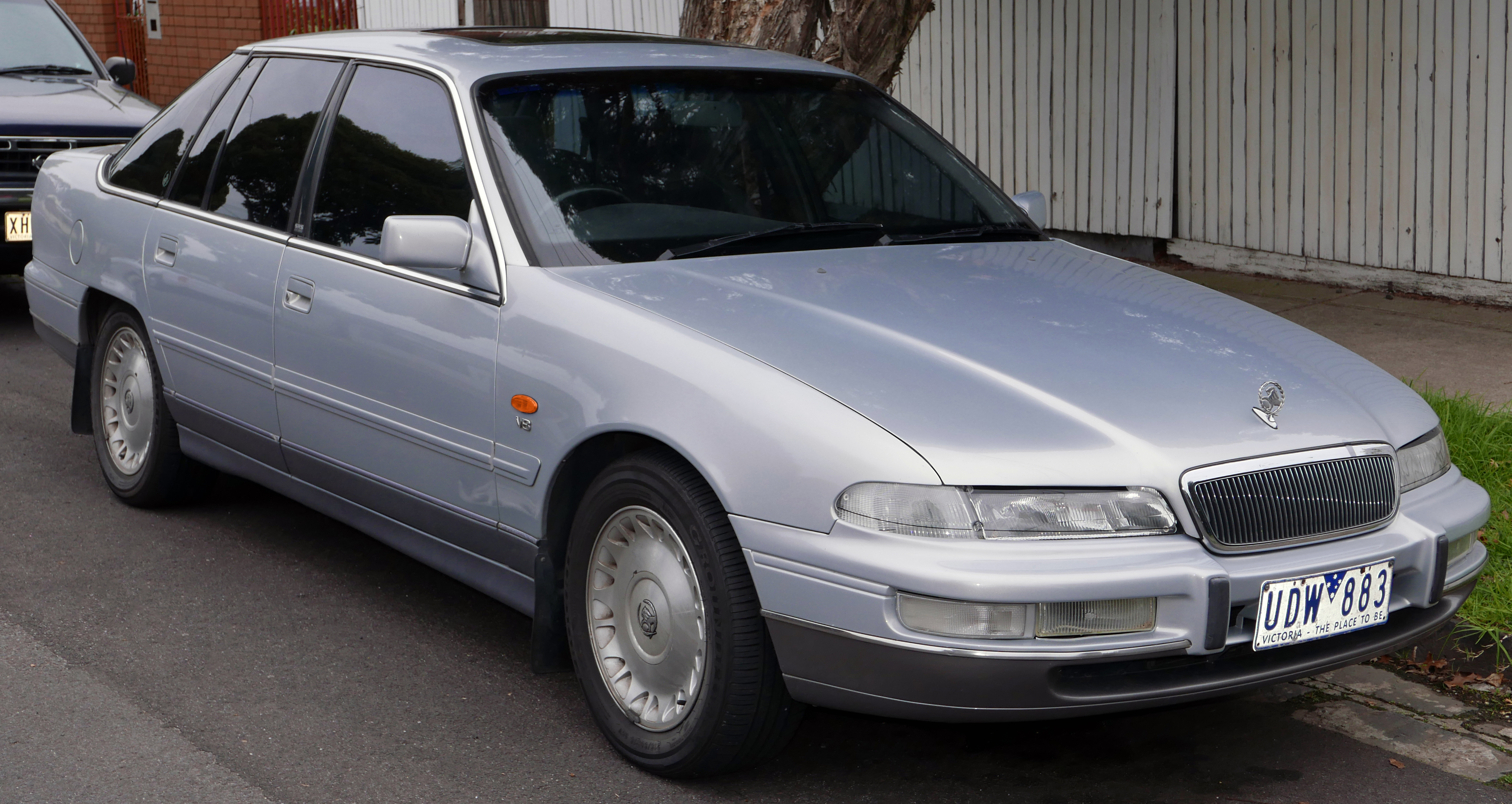
The VS Statesman/Caprice of 1995 represented a mild facelift of the VR, which in turn was an update of the 1990 VQ – Holden's long-wheelbase version of the VN Commodore series.

The company changed throughout the 1990s, increasing its Australian market share from 21% in 1991 to 28.2% in 1999. Besides manufacturing Australia's best selling car, which was exported in significant numbers, Holden continued to export many locally produced engines to power cars made elsewhere. In this decade, Holden adopted a strategy of importing cars it needed to offer a full range of competitive vehicles. During 1998, General Motors-Holden's Ltd name was shortened to "Holden Ltd".

On 26 April 1990, GM's New Zealand subsidiary Holden New Zealand announced that production at the assembly plant based in Trentham would be phased out and vehicles would be imported duty-free, this came after the 1984 closure of the Petone assembly line due to low output volumes. During the 1990s, Holden, other Australian automakers and trade unions pressured the Australian Government to halt the lowering of car import tariffs. By 1997, the federal government had already cut tariffs to 22.5%, from 57.5% ten years earlier; by 2000, a plan was formulated to reduce the tariffs to 15%. Holden was critical, saying that Australia's population was not large enough, and that the changes could tarnish the local industry.

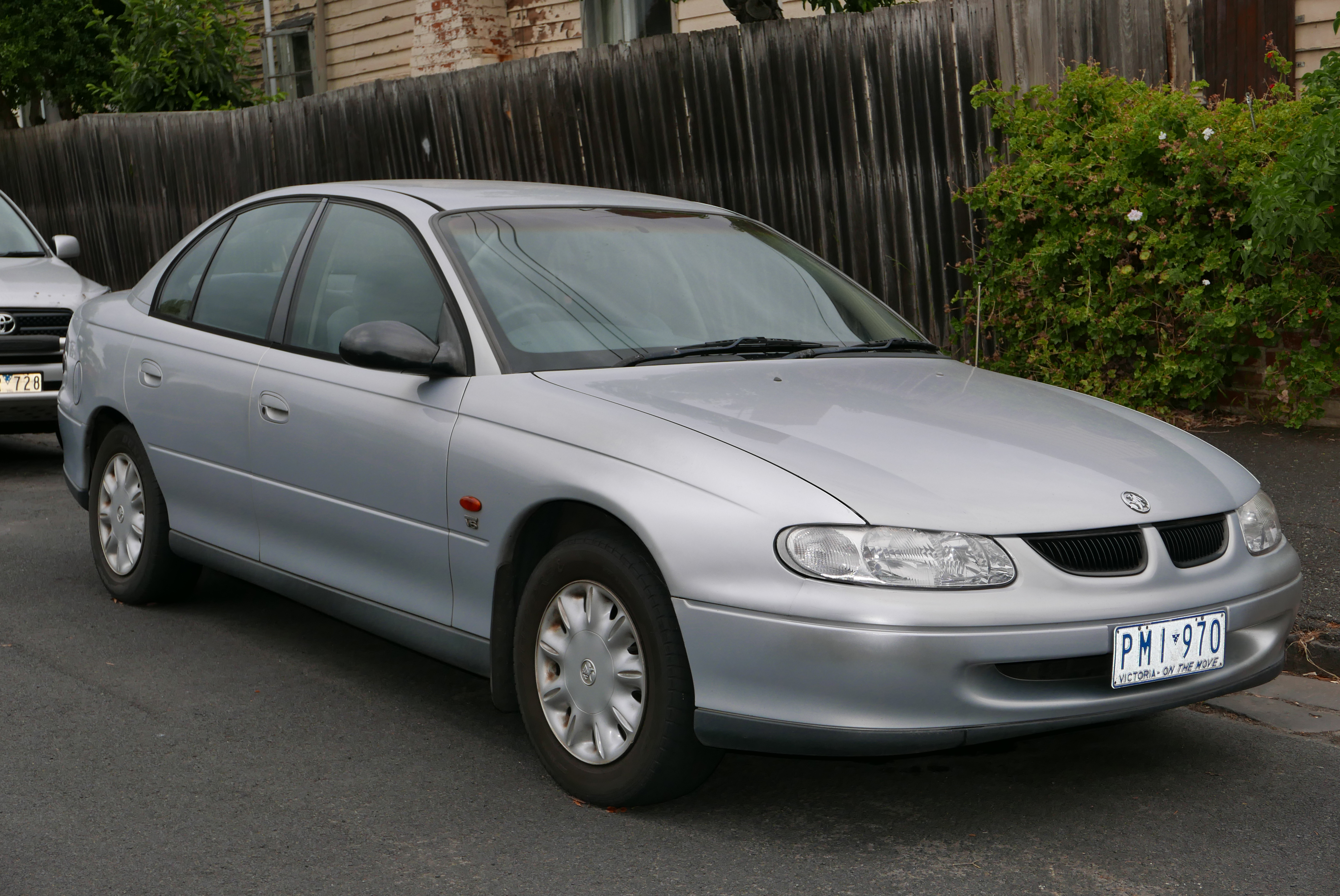
Commodore VT, introduced in 1997, marked the Commodore's global expansion.

Holden reintroduced its defunct Statesman title in 1990 – this time under the Holden marque, as the Statesman and Caprice. For 1991, Holden updated the Statesman and Caprice with a range of improvements, including the introduction of four-wheel anti-lock brakes (ABS); although, a rear-wheel system had been standard on the Statesman Caprice from March 1976. ABS was added to the short-wheelbase Commodore range in 1992. Another returning variant was the full-size utility, and on this occasion it was based on the Commodore. The VN Commodore received a major facelift in 1993 with the VR; compared to the VN, approximately 80% of the car model was new. Exterior changes resulted in a smoother overall body and a "twin-kidney" grille – a Commodore styling trait that remained until the 2002 VY model and remained on HSV variants.

Holden introduced the all-new VT Commodore in 1997, the outcome of a A$600 million development program that spanned more than five years. The new model featured a rounded exterior body shell, improved handling and many firsts for an Australian-built car. Also, a stronger body structure increased crash safety. The locally produced Buick-sourced V6 engine powered the Commodore range, as did the 5.0-litre Holden V8 engine, and was replaced in 1999 by the 5.7-litre LS unit.

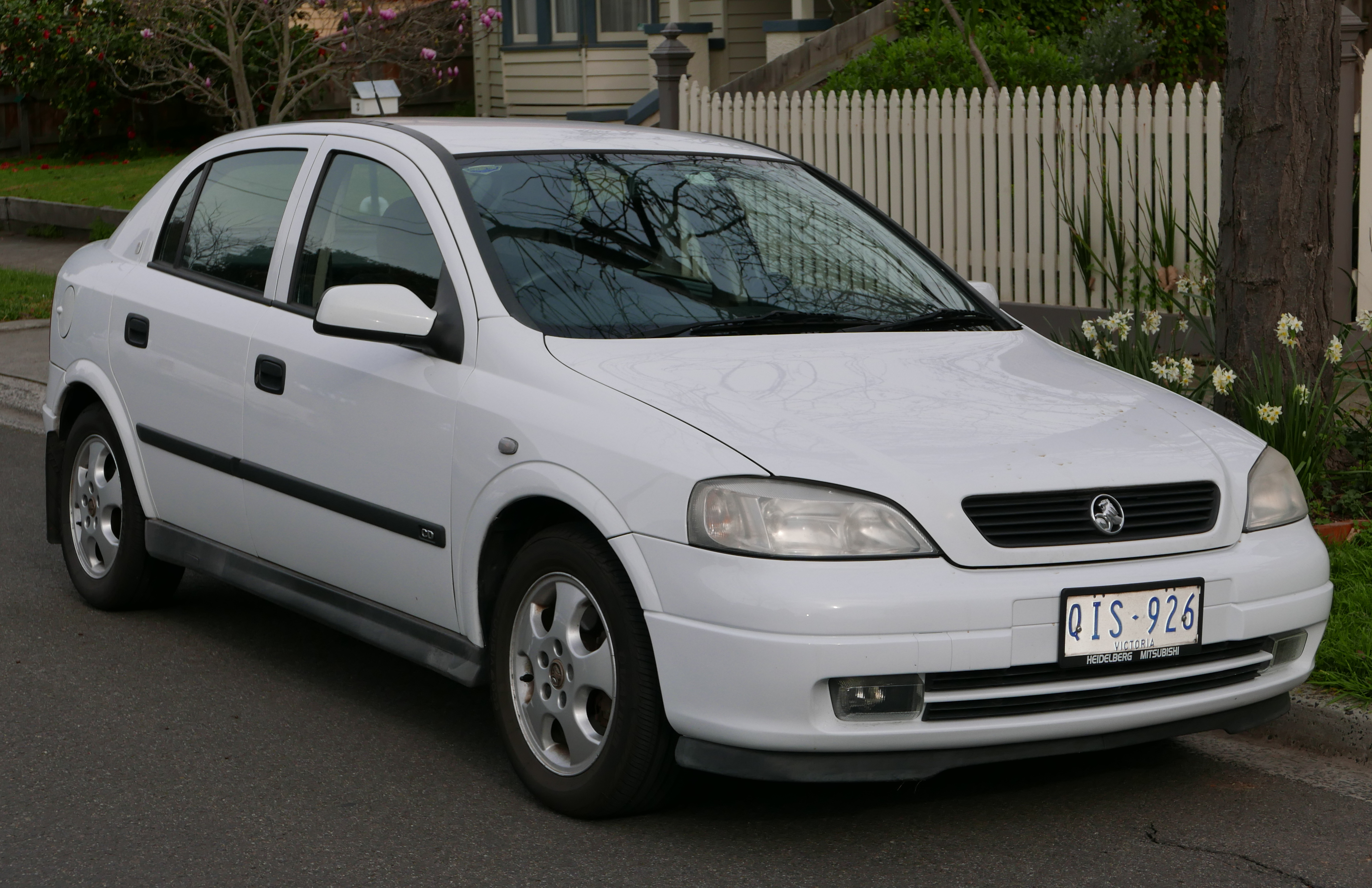
The 1998 Holden Astra continued Holden's trend of sourcing its mid-size and smaller model lines from Opel in Europe.

The UAAI badge-engineered cars first introduced in 1989 sold in far fewer numbers than anticipated, but the Holden Commodore, Toyota Camry, and Corolla were all successful when sold under their original nameplates. The first generation Nova and the donor Corolla were produced at Holden's Dandenong, Victoria facility until 1994. UAAI was dissolved in 1996, and Holden returned to selling only GM products. The Holden Astra and Vectra, both designed by Opel in Germany, replaced the Toyota-sourced Holden Nova and Apollo. This came after the 1994 introduction of the Opel Corsa replacing the already available Suzuki Swift as the source for the Holden Barina. Sales of the full-size Holden Suburban SUV sourced from Chevrolet commenced in 1998 – lasting until 2001. Also in 1998, local assembly of the Vectra began at Elizabeth, South Australia. These cars were exported to Japan and Southeast Asia with Opel badges. However, the Vectra did not achieve sufficient sales in Australia to justify local assembly, and reverted to being fully imported in 2000.

=== 2000s ===
In the 1990s, Holden's share of the Australian market surged and peaked at 27.5% in 2000 before declining to 15.2% in 2006. From March 2003, Holden no longer held the number one sales position in Australia, losing ground to Toyota. Commodore sales had peaked in 1998 at 94,642 vehicles and were relatively stable up to 2004 before going into a steady decline. Total Holden sales peaked in 2002 at 178,392 vehicles and were stable up to 2005 before declining for the rest of the decade and the next.

This downturn affected Holden's profits; the company recorded a combined gain of A$842.9 million from 2002 to 2004, and a combined loss of A$290 million from 2005 to 2006. Factors contributing to the loss included the development of an all-new model, the strong Australian dollar and the cost of reducing the workforce at the Elizabeth plant, including the loss of 1,400 jobs after the closure of the third-shift assembly line in 2005, after two years in operation. Holden fared better in 2007, posting an A$6 million loss. This was followed by an A$70.2 million loss in the 2008, an A$210.6 million loss in 2009, and a profit of A$112 million in 2010. On 18 May 2005, "Holden Ltd" became "GM Holden Ltd", coinciding with the resettling to the new Holden headquarters on 191 Salmon Street, Port Melbourne, Victoria.

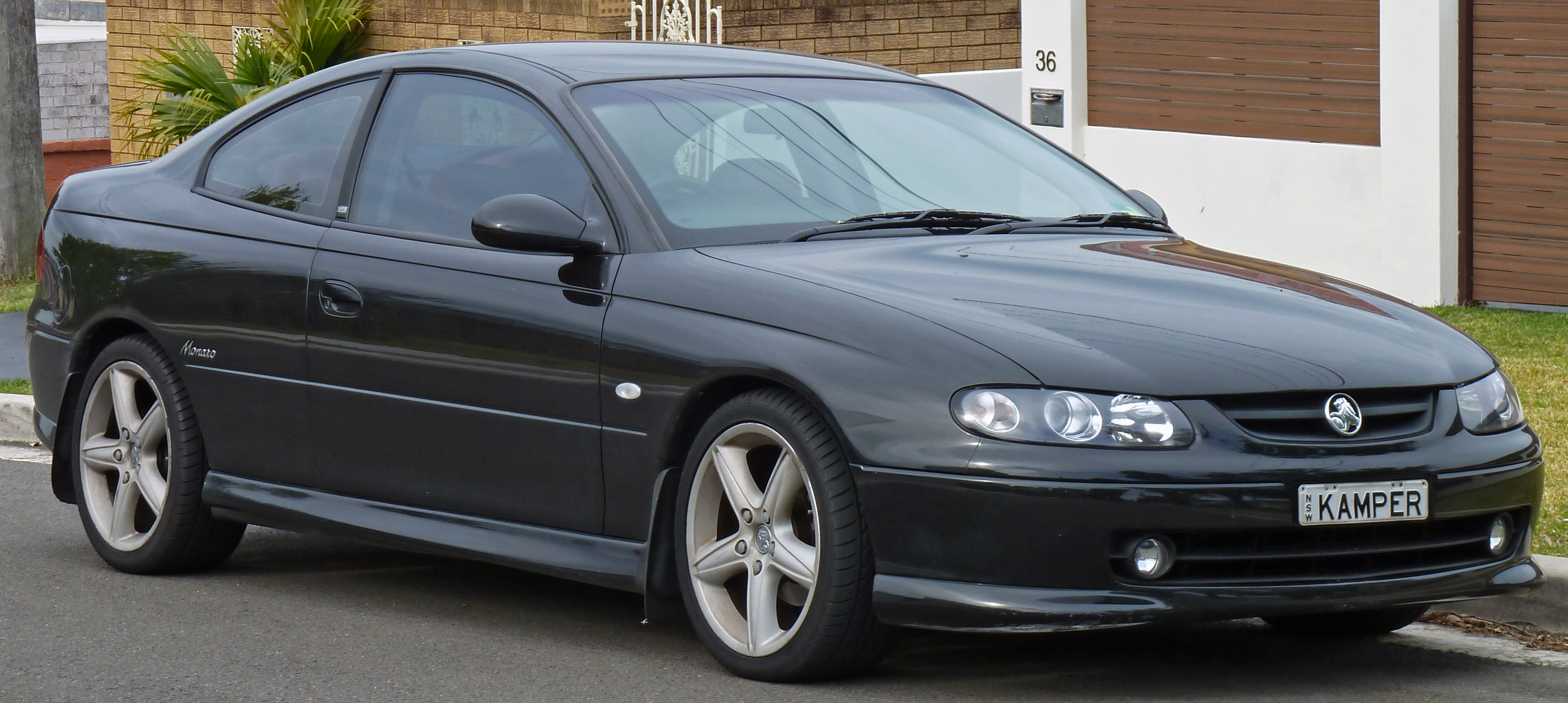
The Monaro coupé was resurrected in 2001 as a low-volume niche model. Unanticipated overseas demand proved otherwise, with the Monaro selling in the UK as a Vauxhall Monaro and throughout the United States as the Pontiac GTO.

Holden caused controversy in 2005 with their Holden Employee Pricing television advertisement, which ran from October to December 2005. The campaign publicised, "for the first time ever, all Australians can enjoy the financial benefit of Holden Employee Pricing". However, this did not include a discounted dealer delivery fee and savings on factory fitted options and accessories that employees received. At the same time, employees were given a further discount of 25 to 29% on selected models.

Holden revived the Monaro coupe in 2001. Based on the Commodore VX architecture, the coupe attracted worldwide attention after being shown as a concept car at Australian auto shows. The VX Commodore received its first major update in 2002 with the VY series. A mildly facelifted VZ model launched in 2004, introducing the High Feature engine. This was built at the Fishermans Bend facility completed in 2003, with a maximum output of 900 engines per day. This has reportedly added A$5.2 billion to the Australian economy; exports account for about A$450 million alone. After the VZ, the High Feature engine powered the all-new Holden Commodore (VE). In contrast to previous models, the VE no longer used an Opel-sourced platform adapted both mechanically and in size, but was based on the Holden developed GM Zeta platform, that was earmarked to become a "Global RWD Architecture", until plans were cancelled due to the 2008 financial crisis.

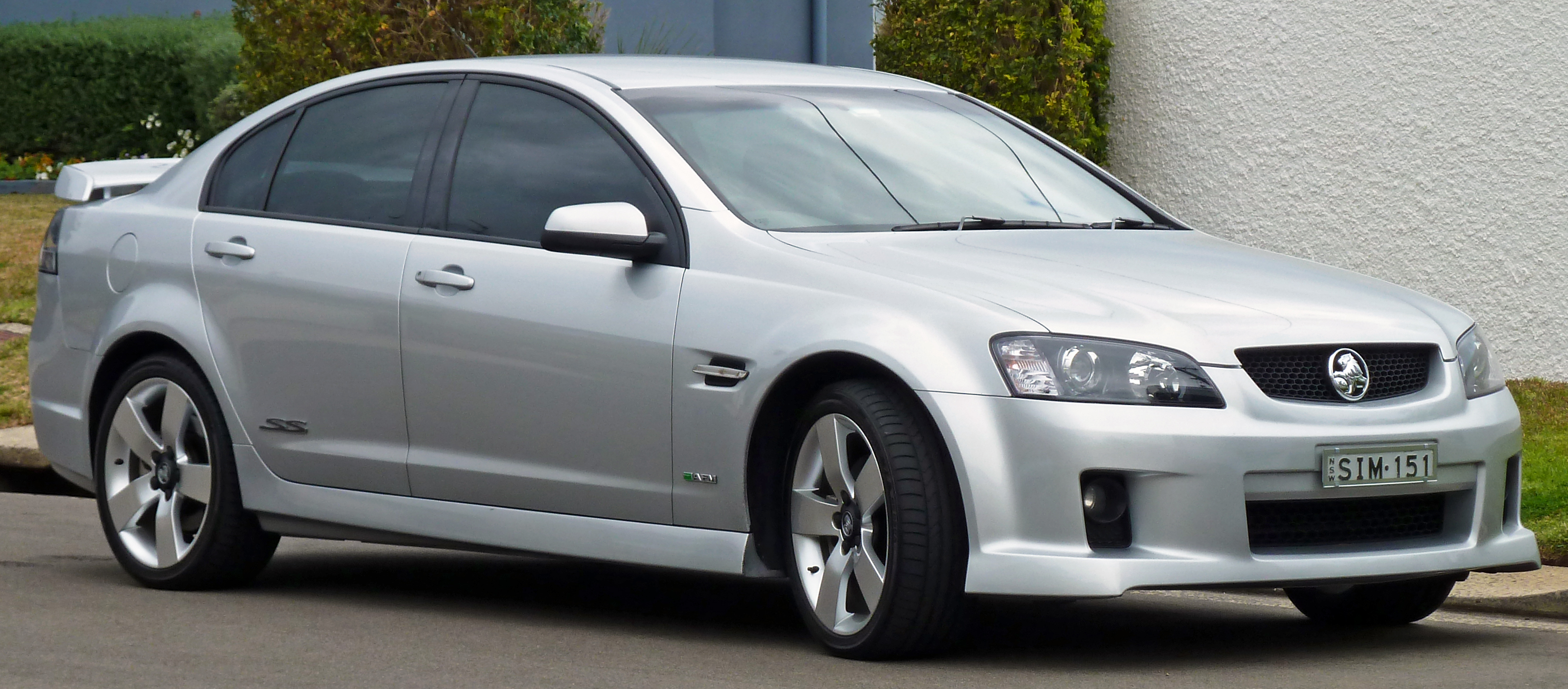
Holden updated the Commodore with the VE series in 2006, Holden's first "clean-sheet" design since 1971.

Throughout the 1990s, Opel had also been the source of many Holden models. To increase profitability, Holden looked to the South Korean Daewoo brand for replacements after acquiring a 44.6% stake – worth US$251 million – in the company in 2002 as a representative of GM. This was increased to 50.9% in 2005, but when GM further increased its stake to 70.1% around the time of its 2009 Chapter 11 reorganisation, Holden's interest was relinquished and transferred to another (undisclosed) part of GM.

The commencement of the Holden-branded Daewoo models began with the 2005 Holden Barina, which based on the Daewoo Kalos, replaced the Opel Corsa as the source of the Barina. In the same year, the Viva, based on the Daewoo Lacetti, replaced the entry-level Holden Astra Classic, although the new-generation Astra introduced in 2004 continued on. The Captiva crossover SUV came next in 2006. After discontinuing the Frontera and Jackaroo models in 2003, Holden was only left with one all-wheel drive model: the Adventra, a Commodore-based station wagon. The fourth model to be replaced with a South Korean alternative was the Vectra by the mid-size Epica in 2007. As a result of the split between GM and Isuzu, Holden lost the rights to use the "Rodeo" nameplate. Consequently, the Holden Rodeo was facelifted and relaunched as the Colorado in 2008.

Following Holden's successful application for a A$149 million government grant to build a localised version of the Chevrolet Cruze in Australia from 2011, Holden in 2009 announced that it would initially import the small car unchanged from South Korea as the Holden Cruze. Following the government grant announcement, Kevin Rudd, Australia's Prime Minister at the time, stated that production would support 600 new jobs at the Elizabeth facility; however, this failed to take into account Holden's previous announcement, whereby 600 jobs would be shed when production of the Family II engine ceased in late 2009.

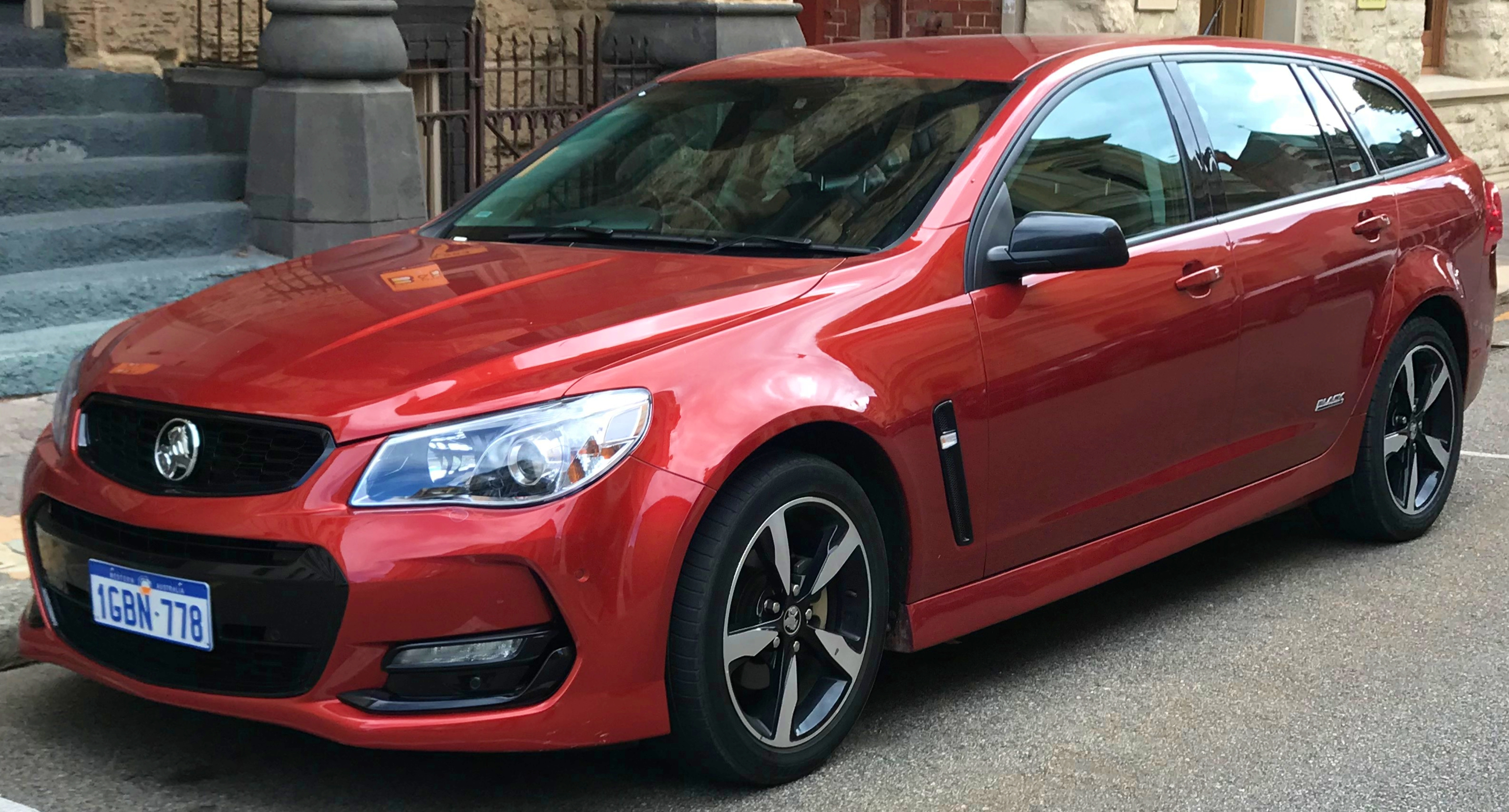
The VF Commodore; the last locally produced model in Holden's lineup

=== 2010s–2021 ===
In March 2012, Holden was given a $270 million lifeline by the Australian Federal Government (Labor Party of Australia) along with the South Australian and Victorian state governments. In return, Holden planned to inject over $1 billion into car manufacturing in Australia. They estimated the new investment package would return around $4 billion to the Australian economy and see GM Holden continue making cars in Australia until at least 2022.

In mid-2013, Holden sought a further A$265 million, in addition to the A$275 million that was already committed by the Federal, South Australian and Victorian governments to remain viable as a car manufacturer in Australia. A source close to Holden informed The Australian newspaper that the car company was losing money on every vehicle that it produced and consequently initiated negotiations to reduce employee wages by up to A$200 per week to cut costs, following the announcement of 400 job cuts and an assembly line reduction of 65 (400 to 335) cars per day. From 2001 to 2012, Holden received over A$150 million a year in subsidy from Australian government. The subsidy from 2007 was more than Holden's capital investment of the same period. From 2004, Holden was only able to make a profit in 2010 and 2011.

Industry Minister Kim Carr confirmed on 10 July 2013 that talks had been scheduled between the Australian government and Holden. On 13 August 2013, 1700 employees at the Elizabeth plant in South Australia voted to accept a three-year wage freeze to decrease the chances of the production line's closure in 2016. Holden's ultimate survival, though, depended on continued negotiations with the Federal Government – to secure funding for the period from 2016 to 2022 – and the final decision of the global headquarters in Detroit, US.

Following an unsuccessful attempt to secure the extra funding required from the new Liberal-National coalition government, on 11 December 2013 General Motors announced that Holden would cease engine and vehicle manufacturing operations in Australia by the end of 2017. As a result, 2,900 jobs would be lost over four years. Beyond 2017 Holden's Australian presence would consist of a national sales company, a parts distribution centre and a global design studio.

In May 2014, GM reversed their decision to abandon the Lang Lang Proving Ground and decided to keep it as part of its engineering capability in Australia.

In 2015, Holden again began selling a range of Opel-derived cars comprising the Astra VXR and Insignia VXR (both based on the OPC models sold by Vauxhall) and Cascada. Later that year, Holden also announced plans to sell the European Astra and the South Korean Cruze alongside each other from 2017.

In December 2015, Belgian entrepreneur Guido Dumarey commenced negotiations to buy the Commodore manufacturing plant in Elizabeth with a view to continue producing a rebadged Zeta-based premium range of rear and all-wheel drive vehicles for local and export sales. The proposal was met with doubt in South Australia, and it later came to nothing. On 20 October 2017, Holden ceased manufacturing vehicles in Australia with the closure of the Elizabeth plant. Afterwards, Holden became an importer of rebadged cars from various GM subsidiaries located in the United States, Canada, Germany, Thailand, and South Korea.

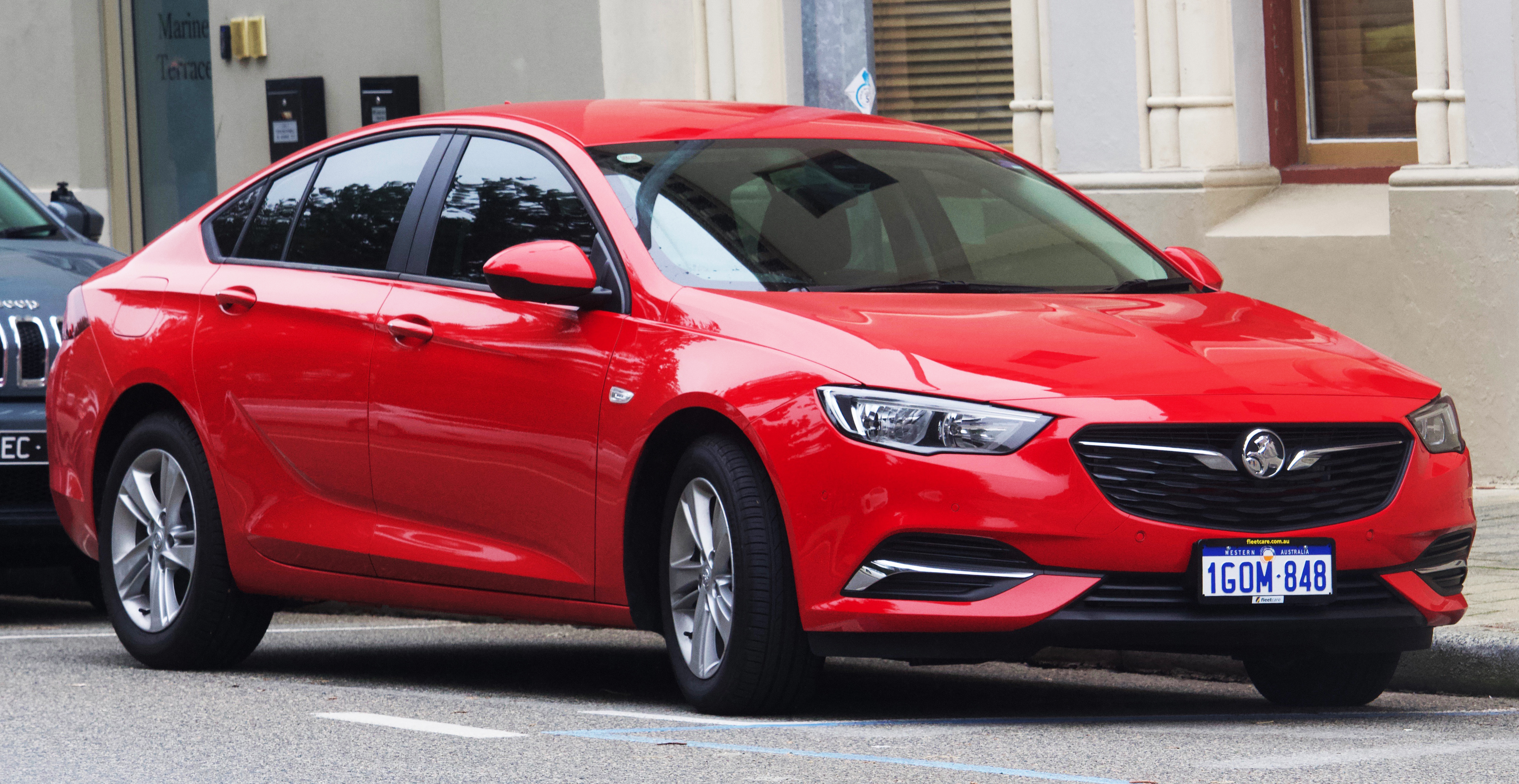
The Holden Commodore (ZB); a re-badged Opel, was the last Commodore model before the discontinuation of the Holden marque

On 17 February 2020, General Motors announced that the Holden brand would be retired by 2021, after GM stated it would no longer make right-hand drive vehicles globally, leaving the Australia and New Zealand market altogether. Holden produced nearly 7.7 million vehicles.

== Vehicles ==
Holden-designed models

- Holden Standard (1948–1968)
- Holden Utility (1951–2000)
- Holden 48-215-FJ (1948–1956)
- Holden Panel Van (1953–1969)
- Holden FE-FC (1956–1960)
- Holden FB-EK (1960–1962)
- Holden Premier (1962–1968)
- Holden Special (1953–1968)
- Holden Brougham (1968–1971)
- Holden Sandman (1974–1980)
- Holden Camira (1982–1989)
- Holden Statesman/Caprice (1990–2017)
- Holden Commodore/Berlina/Calais (1978–2017)
- Holden Adventra (2003–2006)
- Holden Crewman (2003–2006)
- Holden Ute (2000–2017)
- Holden Belmont/Kingswood/Premier (1968–1984)
- Holden Monaro (1968–1977; 2001–2006)
- Holden Sunbird/Torana (1967–1980)
- Statesman (1971–1984)

Chevrolet-based models

- Holden Astra Sedan (2017–2019)
- Holden Barina (2011–2018)
- Holden Colorado (2008–2020)
- Holden Colorado 7/Trailblazer (2012–2020)
- Holden Malibu (2013–2016)
- Holden Suburban (1998–2001)
- Holden Trax (2013–2020)
- Holden Volt (2012–2015)
- Holden Equinox (2018–2020)

Daewoo-based models

- Holden Barina (2005–2011)
- Holden Captiva (2006–2018)
- Holden Cruze (2009–2016)
- Holden Epica (2007–2011)
- Holden Spark (2009–2020)
- Holden Viva (2005–2009)

GMC-based models

- Holden Acadia (2018–2020)

Isuzu-based models

- Holden Camira (1984–1987), only in New Zealand
- Holden Frontera (1995–2004)
- Holden Gemini (1975–1986)
- Holden Jackaroo/Monterey (1981–2002)
- Holden Piazza (1986–1988)
- Holden Rodeo (1981–2008)
- Holden Shuttle (1982–1990)

Nissan-based models

- Holden Astra (1984–1989)

Opel/Vauxhall-based models

- Holden Astra (1996–2009, 2015–2020)
- Holden Barina (1994–2005)
- Holden Calibra (1991–1998)
- Holden Cascada (2015–2017)
- Holden Combo (1996–2012)
- Holden Commodore (2018–2020)
- Holden Insignia (2015–2017)
- Holden Tigra (2005–2007)
- Holden Vectra (1997–2006)
- Holden Zafira (2001–2005)

Suzuki-based models

- Holden Barina (1985–1994)
- Holden Cruze (2002–2006)
- Holden Drover
- Holden Scurry

Toyota-based models

- Holden Apollo (1989–1996)
- Holden Nova (1989–1996)

== Driveline components ==
Inline-4 engines

- Holden Starfire motor (1978–1986)
- GM Family II engine (for Opel) (1981–2009)

Inline-6 engines

- Holden straight-six motor (1948–1986)

V6 engines

- Holden 3800 (1988–2006)
- Holden AlloyTec (2004–2016)

V8 engines

- Holden V8 engine (1968–2000)

Transmissions

- Holden TriMatic (1970–1988)
- Holden manual transmission (1948–1986)

Differentials

- Holden Banjo differential (1948–1984)
- Holden Salisbury differential (1968–1988)

== Corporate affairs and identity ==
2007 sales and production
Vehicle sales	Units
Passenger vehicles	104,848
Light commercial vehicles	33,554
Sport utility vehicles	11,091
Total	146,680
Vehicle production	Units
Total	107,795
Engine production	Units
Family II	136,699
High Feature	132,722
Total	269,421
Exports	Units
Engines	173,463
Vehicles	36,534
Total	209,997

Holden's logo, of a lion holding a stone, was introduced in 1928. Holden's Motor Body Builders appointed Rayner Hoff to design the emblem, which refers to a fable in which observations of lions rolling stones led to the invention of the wheel. With the 1948 launch of the 48–215, Holden revised its logo. It commissioned another redesign in 1972 to better represent the company. The emblem was reworked once more in 1995.

1928–1969

1969–1995

1995–2014

2014–2016

In 1987, Holden established Holden Special Vehicles (HSV) in partnership with Tom Walkinshaw, who primarily manufactured modified, high-performance Commodore variants. To further reinforce the brand, HSV introduced the HSV Dealer Team into the V8 Supercar fold in 2005 under the naming rights of Toll HSV Dealer Team.

In 2010, Holden sold vehicles across Australia through the Holden Dealer Network (310 authorised stores and 12 service centres), which employed more than 13,500 people. On 8 May 2015, Jeff Rolfs, Holden's CFO, became interim chairman and managing director. Holden announced on 6 February 2015 that Mark Bernhard would return to Holden as chairman and managing director, the first Australian to hold the post in 25 years.

=== Exports ===
Holden began to export vehicles in 1954, sending the FJ to New Zealand. Exports to New Zealand continued, but to broaden their export potential, Holden began to cater their Commodore, Monaro and Statesman/Caprice models for both right- and left-hand drive markets. The Middle East was Holden's largest export market, with the Commodore sold as the Chevrolet Lumina from 1998, and the Statesman from 1999 as the Chevrolet Caprice. Commodores were also sold as the Chevrolet Lumina in Brunei, Fiji and South Africa, and as the Chevrolet Omega in Brazil. Pontiac in North America also imported Commodore sedans from 2008 through to 2009 as the G8. The G8's cessation was a consequence of GM's Chapter 11 bankruptcy resulting in the demise of the Pontiac brand.

Sales of the Monaro began in 2003 to the Middle East as the Chevrolet Lumina Coupe. Later that year a modified version of the Monaro began selling in the United States (but not in Canada) as the Pontiac GTO, and under the Monaro name through Vauxhall dealerships in the United Kingdom. This arrangement continued through to 2006 when the car was discontinued. The long-wheelbase Statesman sales in the Chinese market as the Buick Royaum began in 2005, before being replaced in 2007 by the Statesman-based Buick Park Avenue. Statesman/Caprice exports to South Korea also began in 2005. These Korean models were sold as the Daewoo Statesman, and later as the Daewoo Veritas from 2008. Holden's move into international markets proved profitable; export revenue increased from A$973 million in 1999 to just under $1.3 billion in 2006.

From 2011, the WM Caprice was exported to North America as the Chevrolet Caprice PPV, a version of the Caprice built exclusively for law enforcement in North America and sold only to police. From 2007, the HSV-based Commodore was exported to the United Kingdom as the Vauxhall VXR8.

In 2013, Chevrolet announced that exports of the Commodore would resume to North America in the form of the VF Commodore as the Chevrolet SS sedan for the 2014 model year. The Chevrolet SS Sedan was also imported to the United States (but again, not to Canada) for 2015 with only minor changes, notably the addition of Magnetic Ride Control suspension and a Tremec TR-6060 manual transmission. For the 2016 model year the SS sedan received a facelift based on the VF Series II Commodore unveiled in September 2015. In 2017, production of Holden's last two American exports, the SS and the Caprice PPV was discontinued.

=== Senior management ===
- Edward Holden (1917–1934)
- Laurence Hartnett (1934–1946)
- Harold E. Bettle (1946–1953)
- Earl C. Daum (1953–1959)
- Harlow C. Gage (1959–1962)
- David L. Heglund (1962–1966)
- Max C. Wilson (1966–1968)
- Alexander D. Rhea (1968–1970)
- A. C. "Bill" Gibbs (1970–1973)
- Damon Martin (1973–1976)
- Charles S. "Chuck" Chapman (1976–1987)
- John G. Bagshaw (1987–1990)
- William J. Hamel (1990–1997)
- James R. Wiemels (1997–1999)
- Peter Hanenberger (1999–2003)
- Denny Mooney (2003–2007)
- Chris Gubbey (2007–2008)
- Mark Reuss (2008–2009)
- Alan Batey (2009–2010)
- Michael Devereux (2010–2014)
- Gerry Dorizas (2014–2014)
- Jeff Rolfs (interim chairman and managing director) (2014–2015)
- Mark Bernhard (2015–2018)
- Dave Buttner (2018–2019)
- Kristian Aquilina (Acting chairman and managing director) (2019–2020)

== Sales ==
While previously holding the number one position in Australian vehicle sales, Holden sold progressively fewer cars since the start of the 21st century, in part due to a large drop in Commodore sales.

Sales in Australia
Year	Annual sales	Position	Best selling model
2002	178,392	1	Commodore
2003	175,412	2	Commodore
2004	178,027	2	Commodore
2005	174,464	2	Commodore
2006	146,511	2	Commodore
2007	146,680	2	Commodore
2008	130,338	2	Commodore
2009	119,568	2	Commodore
2010	132,923	2	Commodore
2011	126,095	2	Commodore
2012	114,665	2	Commodore
2013	112,059	2	Commodore
2014	106,092	2	Commodore
2015	102,951	3	Commodore
2016	94,308	4	Commodore
2017	90,306	4	Commodore
2018	60,754	6	Colorado
2019	43,176	10	Colorado
2020	16,688		Colorado

View source data.

Sales in New Zealand
Year	Annual sales	Position	Best selling model
2002			Commodore
2003			Commodore
2004			Commodore
2005			Commodore
2006			Commodore
2007			Commodore
2008			Commodore
2009			Commodore
2010			Commodore
2011			Commodore
2012		3	Captiva
2013	11,722	3	Commodore
2014	13,422	3	Commodore
2015		2	Colorado
2016		3	Colorado
2017		3	Colorado
2018	13,046	3	Colorado

== Motorsport ==
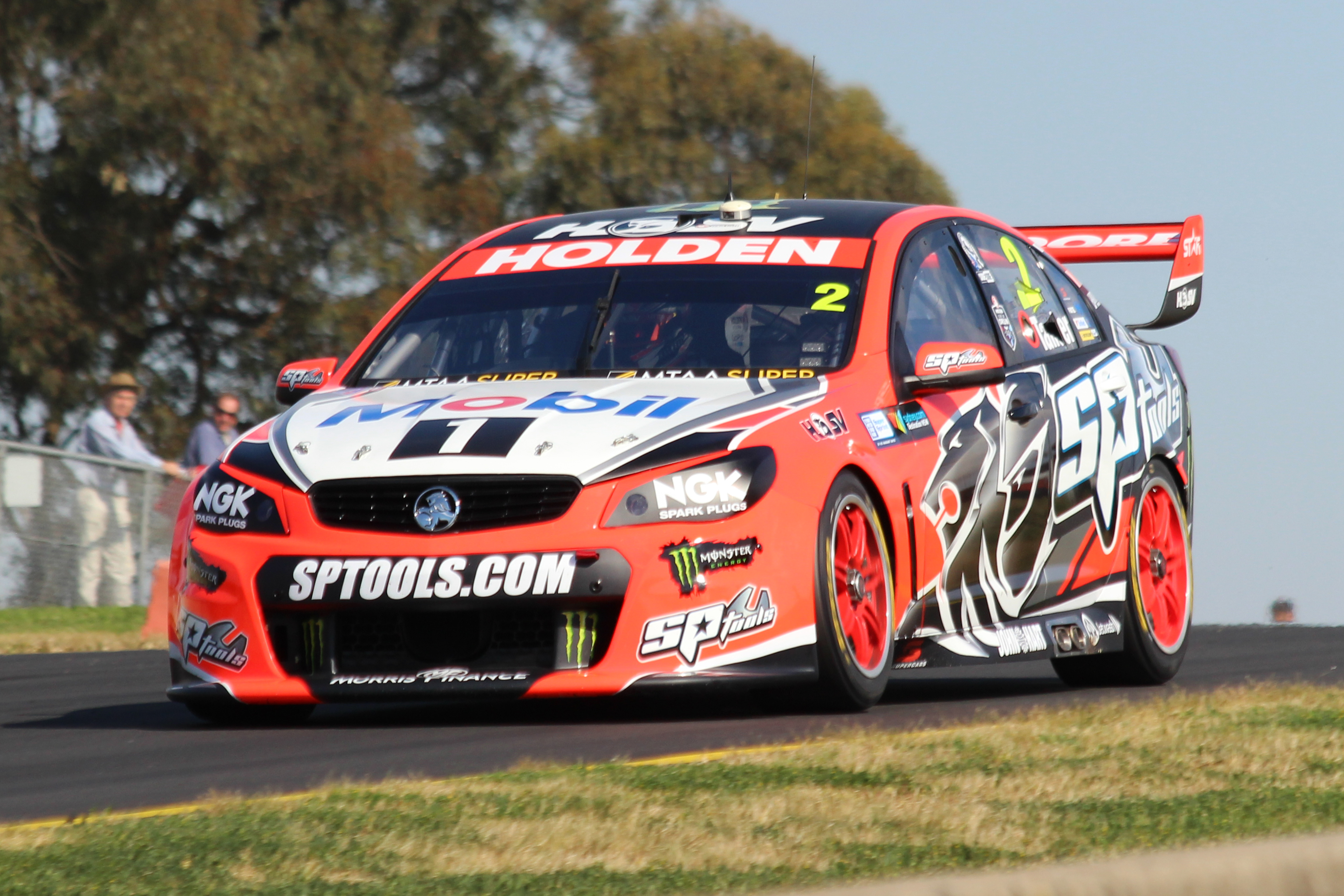
Garth Tander driving a Holden VF Commodore for the Holden Racing Team in 2015

Holden was involved with factory backed teams in Australian touring car racing since 1968. The main factory-backed teams have been the Holden Dealer Team (1969–1986), the Holden Racing Team (1990–2016) and Triple Eight Race Engineering (2017–2020). As of 2015, Holden won the Bathurst 1000 30 times, more than any other manufacturer, and won the Australian Touring Car and Supercars Championship title 21 times. Brad Jones Racing, Erebus Motorsport, Matt Stone Racing, Tekno Autosports, Team 18 and Walkinshaw Andretti United also ran Holden Commodores in the 2020 Supercars Championship.

== See also ==
- The Death of Holden, a 2016 book
- List of Holden vehicles
- Walkinshaw Performance
