= Holden City Road Plant =

Australian vehicle manufacturing factory

- Location: Melbourne, Victoria, Australia
- Industry: Motor vehicle assembly
- Owner: Holden
- Defunct: 1936

The Holden City Road Plant was a vehicle manufacturing facility owned by General Motors Australia, later Holden in Melbourne, Victoria, Australia that operated from 1926 until 1936.

== History ==
As part of a plan to establish assembly facilities in each Australian state capital, General Motors purchased the City Road site from a timber merchant in 1926. Construction of the automotive plant, which took place simultaneously with gradual decommissioning of the timber yard, was delayed by a major fire in October which destroyed part of the new GM structure.

It closed in 1936.
