= The Death of Holden =

2016 book by Royce Kurmelovs

The Death of Holden: The End of an Australian Dream
- Author: Royce Kurmelovs
- Language: English
- Publisher: Hachette Australia
- Publication date: 2016
- Publication place: Australia
- Pages: 317
- ISBN: 978-0-7336-3578-6 (Paperback)

The Death of Holden: The End of an Australian Dream is a 2016 book by Royce Kurmelovs.

== Background and synopsis ==
The Death of Holden is an in-depth report into the closure of Australian manufacturing operations by Holden. The Death of Holden investigates how such a popular car, often considered a seminal Australian brand, could not sustain local manufacturing operations. It considers the broader future of manufacturing in Australia and the impact on workers and their communities.

== Reception ==
In the Sydney Morning Herald, Steven Carroll describes The Death of Holden as "a case study of modern economics in action."

Patrick Mullins wrote in Books+Publishing that "Kurmelovs is at his best when he records the plaintive, angry, nostalgic, and stoic workers he meets and interviews," but due to lack of access, "falters when he goes after the politicians and car companies."
