= Holden Marrickville Plant =

Automobile manufacturing facility owned by Australian automobile company Holden

- Built: 1936
- Location: Marrickville, New South Wales
- Industry: Motor vehicle assembly
- Owner: Holden
- Defunct: 1940

The Holden Marrickville Plant was a vehicle manufacturing facility owned by General Motors Australia, and later Holden in Marrickville, Sydney from 1926 until 1940.

== History ==
In 1926 General Motors Australia started construction of a Plant in Marrickville. The plant was officially opened by Premier of New South Wales Jack Lang in October 1926.

The Plant was closed down in 1931 after the merger of General Motors Australia and Holden. It reopened in 1934.

It was sold for A£40,000 to Davies Coop and Company Ltd in 1939 for use as a cotton mill. All material, equipment and staff moving to the Holden Pagewood Plant in 1940.
