= Alexander Rhea =

Alexander Dodson Rhea (10 May 1919 – 1 September 2000) was an American industrialist who occupied a series of senior roles with General Motors in the decades following World War II. Between 1949 and 1955 he was treasury and managing director with General Motors de Venezuela based in Caracas before returning to North America. Between 1968 and 1970 he was managing director of General Motors' Australian division, Holden. In September 1970 GM's British based Vauxhall division announced that their £64,000-a-year chief executive, David Hegland had been placed on "special leave of absence" a month after the division announced its worst ever half-year trading loss, and Rhea took over the position of managing director at Vauxhall, a position which he held until 1974.

Alexander Rhea III was the son of Alexander D. Rhea Jr and his wife Annie. Rhea himself married Suzanne Menocal in 1945: the marriage produced one recorded son.
