= Essex Coach =

The Essex Coach was manufactured by the Essex Motor Company in Detroit, Michigan.

== Essex Coach specifications (1926 data) ==
- Color – Body and wheels, blue; running gear, black
- Seating Capacity – Four or five
- Wheelbase – 110½ inches
- Wheels - Wood
- Tires - 30” × 4.95” balloon
- Service Brakes - contracting on rear
- Emergency Brakes - expanding on rear
- Engine - Six cylinder, vertical, cast en bloc, 2-11/16 × 4¼ inches; head removable; valves in side; H.P. 17.32 N.A.C.C. rating
- Lubrication – Splash, with circulating pump
- Crankshaft - Three bearing
- Radiator – Cellular
- Cooling – Thermo-syphon
- Ignition – Storage Battery
- Starting System – Two Unit
- Voltage – Six
- Wiring System – Single
- Gasoline System – Vacuum
- Clutch – Multiple disc in oil
- Transmission – Selective sliding
- Gear Changes – 3 forward, 1 reverse
- Drive – Spiral bevel
- Rear Springs – Semi-elliptic
- Rear Axle – Semi-floating
- Steering Gear – Worm and full worm wheel

=== Standard equipment ===
New car price included the following items:

- tools
- jack
- speedometer
- ammeter
- electric horn
- transmission theft lock
- demountable rims
- spare tire carrier
- sun visor
- cowl ventilator
- headlight dimmer

=== Optional equipment ===
The following was available at an extra cost:

none

=== Prices ===
New car prices were F.O.B. factory, plus Tax:

- Touring - $850
- Coach - $850

== See also ==
- Essex (automobile)
