= Essex (automobile) =

Defunct American motor vehicle manufacturer

Essex logo

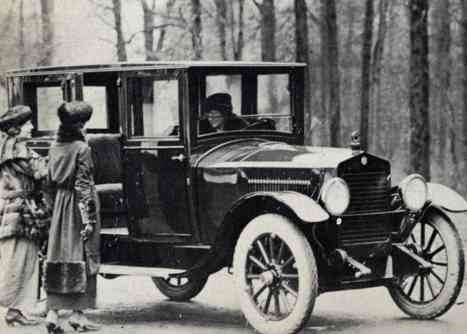
1919 Essex

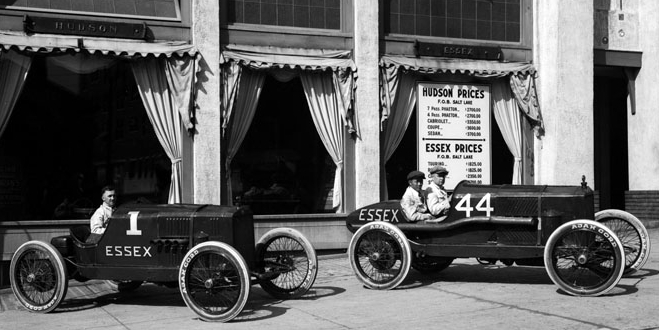
Essex racecars on display in Salt Lake City, 1920

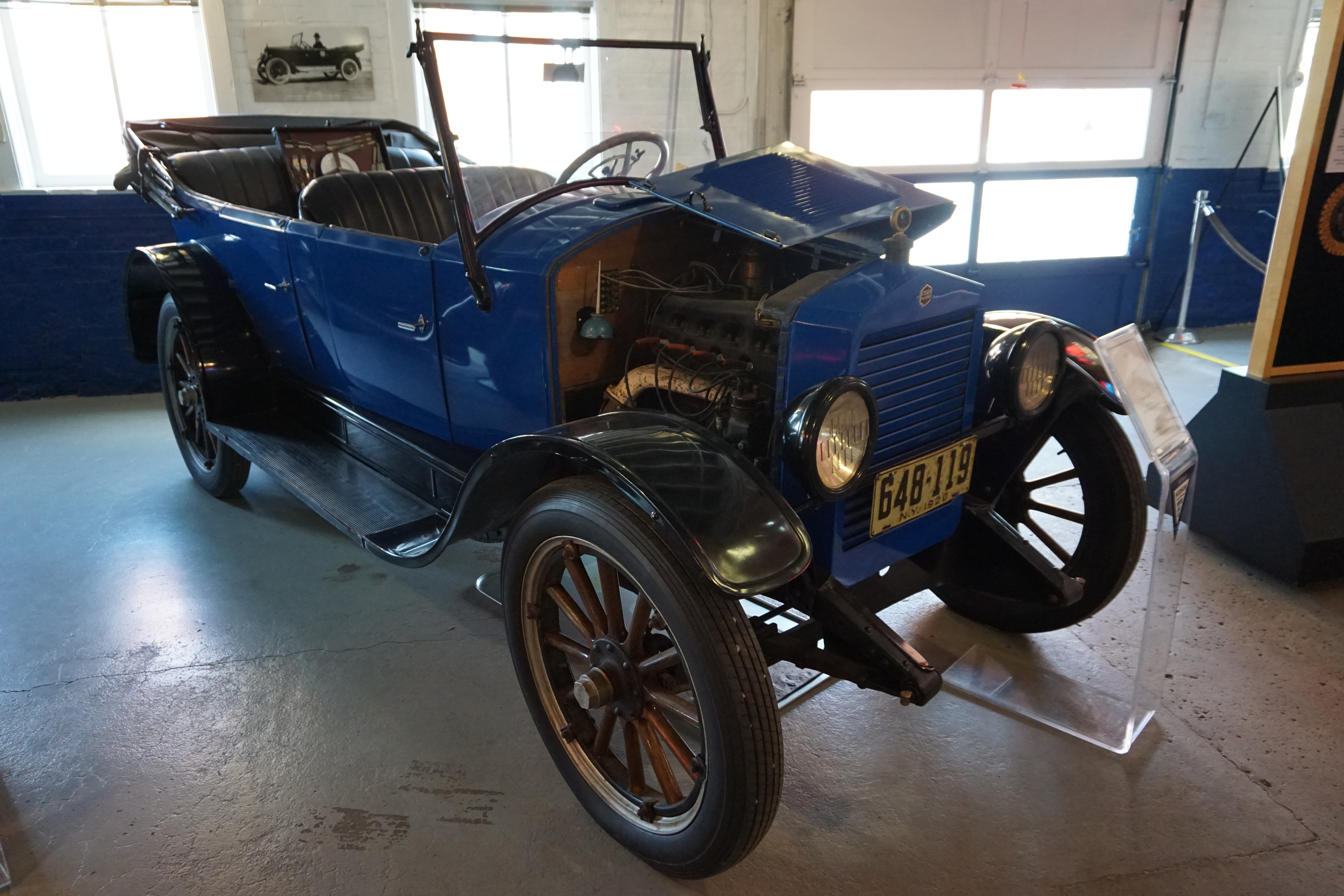
1920 Essex at the Ypsilanti Automotive Heritage Museum

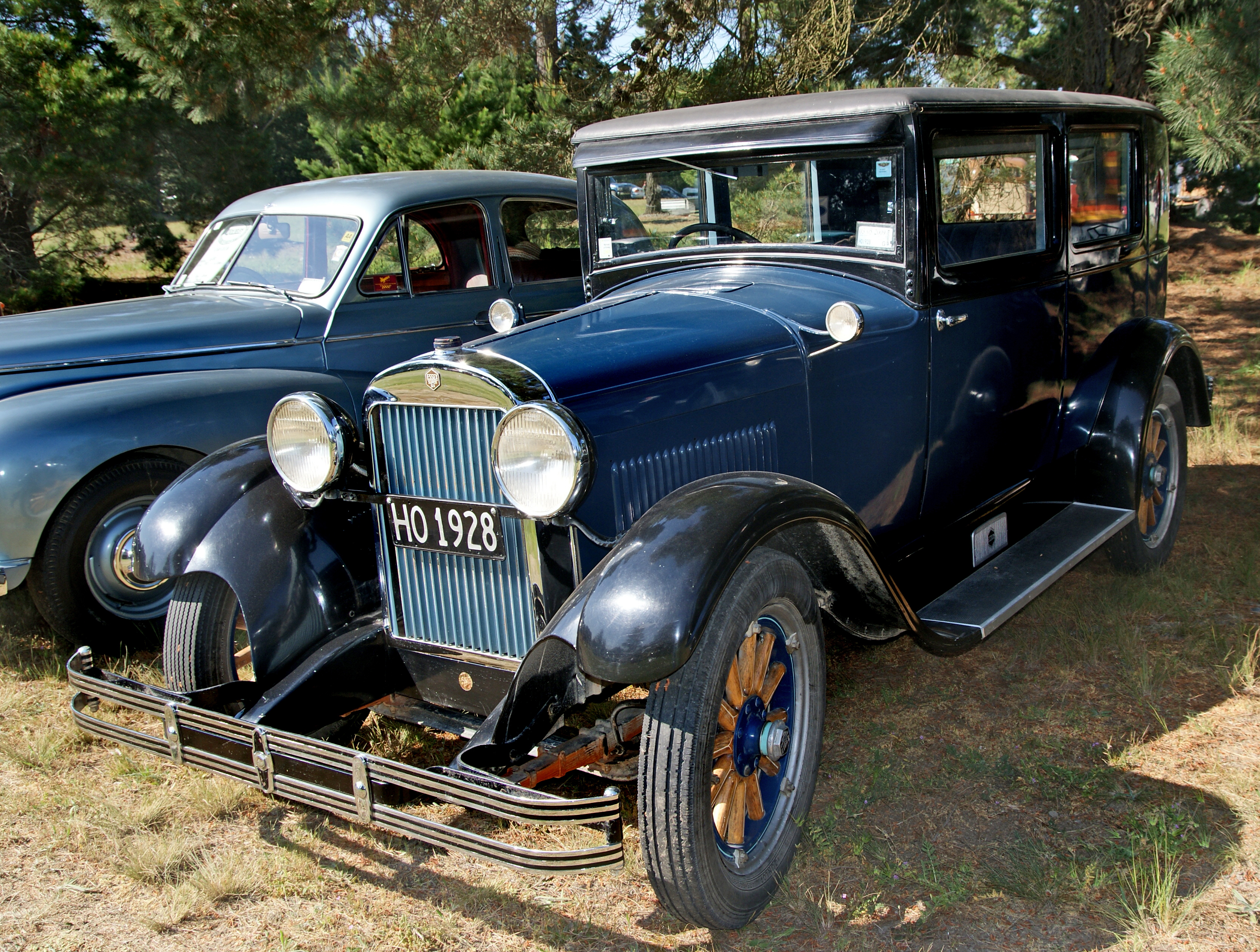
1928 Essex Super Six (New Zealand)

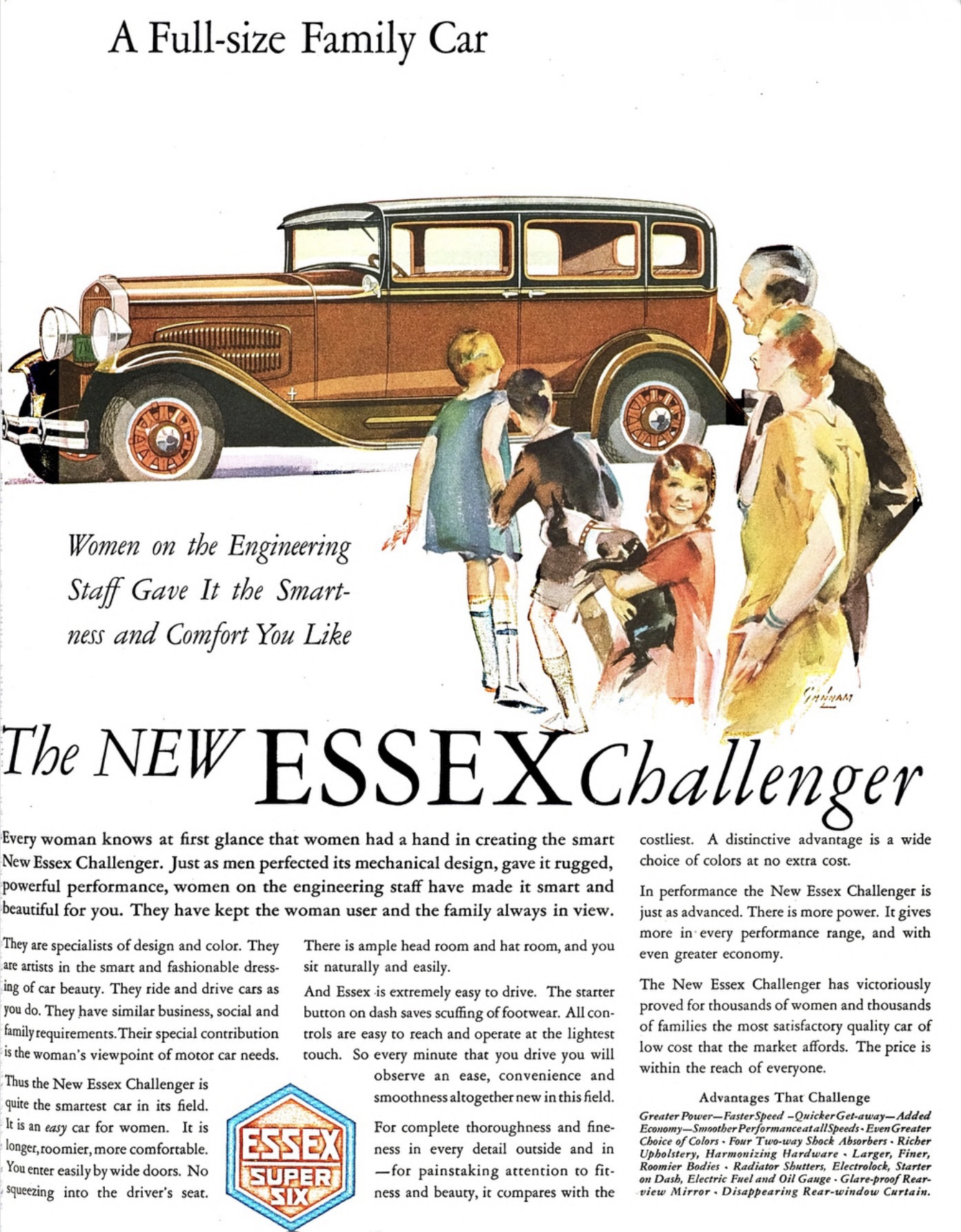
Essex Challenger (1930)

The Essex was a brand of automobile produced by the Essex Motor Company between 1918 and 1922, and by Hudson Motor Car Company of Detroit, Michigan between 1922 and 1933.

== Corporate strategy ==
During its production run, the Essex was considered a small car and was affordably priced. The Essex is generally credited with starting a trend away from open touring cars design toward enclosed passenger compartments.

Originally, the Essex was to be a product of the "Essex Motor Company," which was a wholly owned entity of Hudson. Essex enjoyed immediate popularity following its 1919 introduction. Essex Motors went so far as to lease the Studebaker auto factory in Detroit for the production of the car. More than 1.13 million Essex automobiles were sold by the time the Essex name was retired in 1932 and replaced by the Terraplane. That year the Essex Motor Company was dissolved and the cars officially became a product of Hudson.

== Essex cars ==
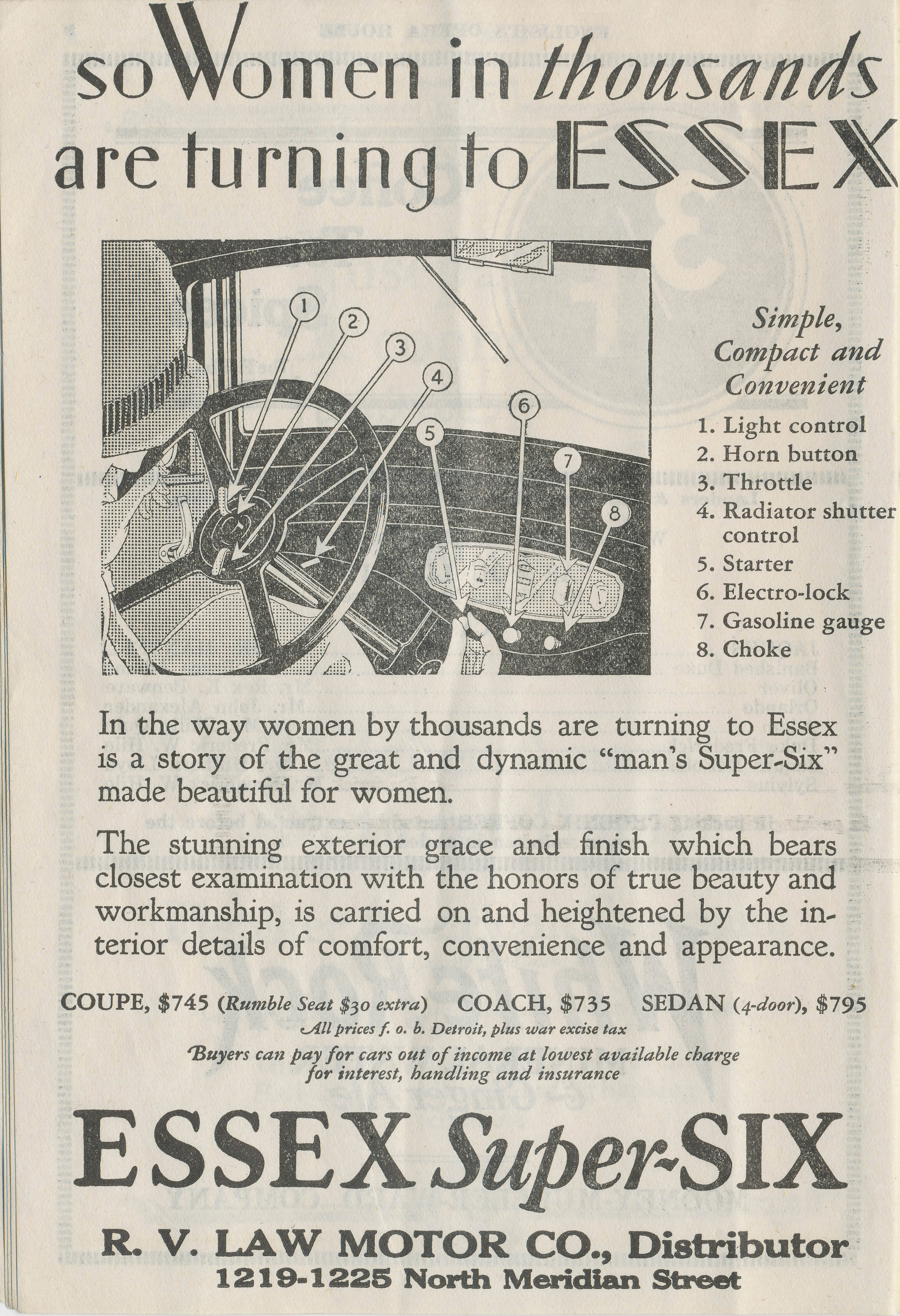
Advertisement for the Essex Super-Six, marketing the car to women drivers

Essex cars were designed to be moderately priced cars which would be affordable to the average family. Proving durable, their capabilities were checked upon and confirmed by AAA and the United States Post Office. In 1919, an Essex completed a 50-hour, 3,037.4 miles (4,888.2 km) endurance test in Cincinnati, Ohio, at an average speed of 60.75 miles per hour (97.77 km/h). The early Essex cars also captured many hill climb records. In a special Essex race car, Glen Shultz won the 1923 Pikes Peak Hill Climb. It had a 108.5-inch (2,760 mm) wheelbase.

Initially, Essex marketed a line of touring cars (open four-door cars with canvas tops), which was the most popular body style of cars in production at the time. While Essex added an enclosed sedan in 1920, in 1922 Essex released the first closed coach available at a price close to its open-bodied brethren, priced at $1,495 (US$29,983.65 in 2026 dollars), $300 above that of the touring car. By 1925, the coach was priced below the touring car. While Henry Ford is credited with inventing the affordable car, it was Essex that made the enclosed car affordable.

In 1928, the big news was the use of four-wheel mechanical brakes. Essex boasted "piano hinge doors" which were exceptionally strong. An advertisement shows a man fully supported by an open door to demonstrate the strength of the hinge.

1926 Specs

- Wheelbase = 110.5 in (2,807 mm)
- Length = 14 ft 6 in (4,420 mm)
- Turning Radius = 23 ft (7.0 m)
- Road Clearance = 8.75 in (222 mm)
- Brakes = 14 in (356 mm) drums

By 1929, the Essex was third in U.S. sales, behind Ford and Chevrolet.

Essex sales remained strong into 1931 before sales began to trend downward. For 1932 a redesigned Essex debuted and was named the Essex-Terraplane, a play on the word aeroplane. For 1934 the Essex name was dropped and the car was marketed as the Terraplane.

The instrument panel of the 1932 Hudson and Essex automobiles featured the first use of "warning lights" instead of gauges.

== Essex production models ==
- Essex Coach
- Essex Six

== International production ==
Essex motor vehicles were either exported as complete cars or locally built from knock-down kits in many countries, making the Essex marque well known internationally as well as domestically. Essex vehicles were locally built in Canada, the United Kingdom, Germany, Australia, New Zealand, and South Africa.

== Gallery ==
Essex Super Six Automobiles

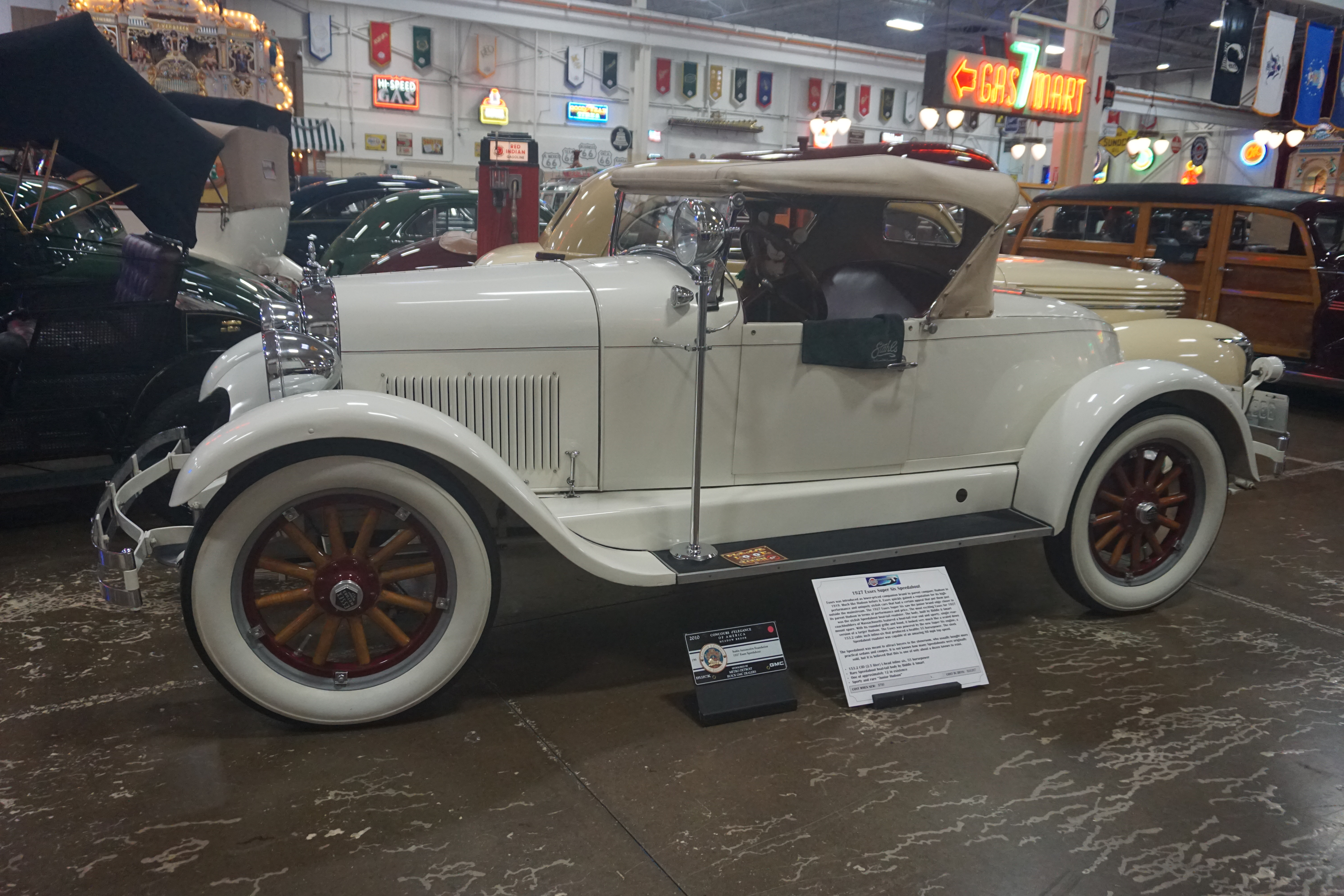
1927 Essex Super Six Speedabout

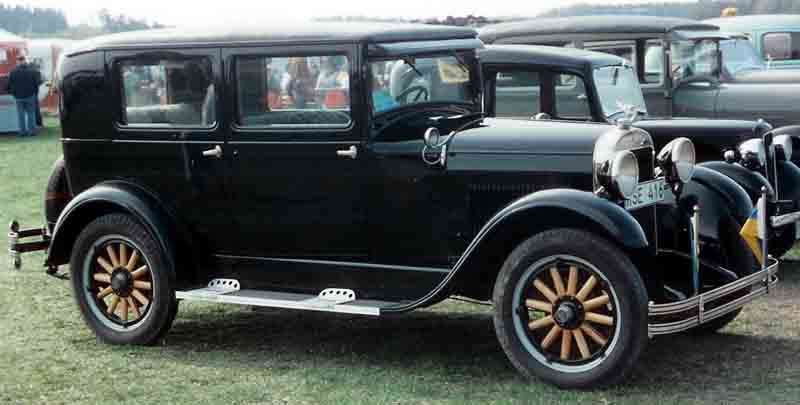
1928 Essex Super Six 4-Door Sedan

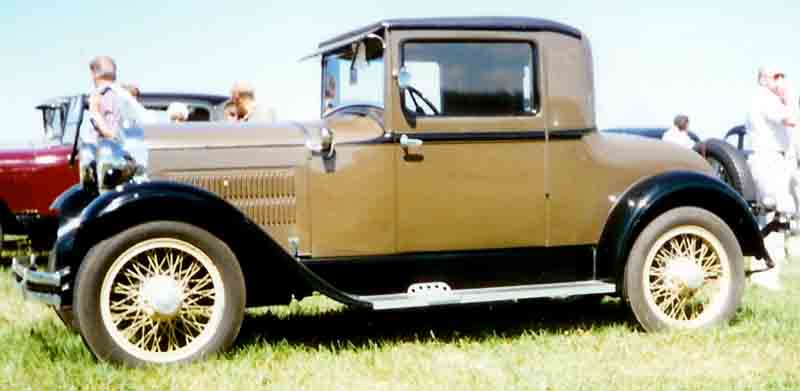
1929 Essex Super Six Coupé

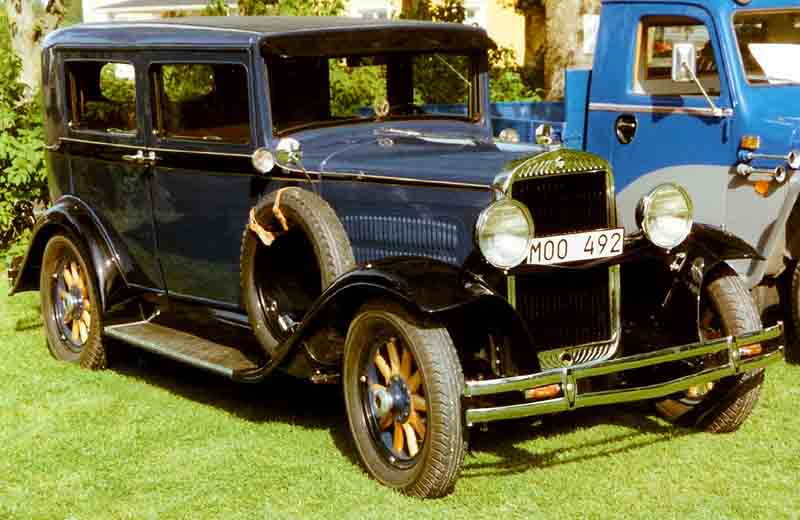
1930 Essex Super Six 4-Door Sedan

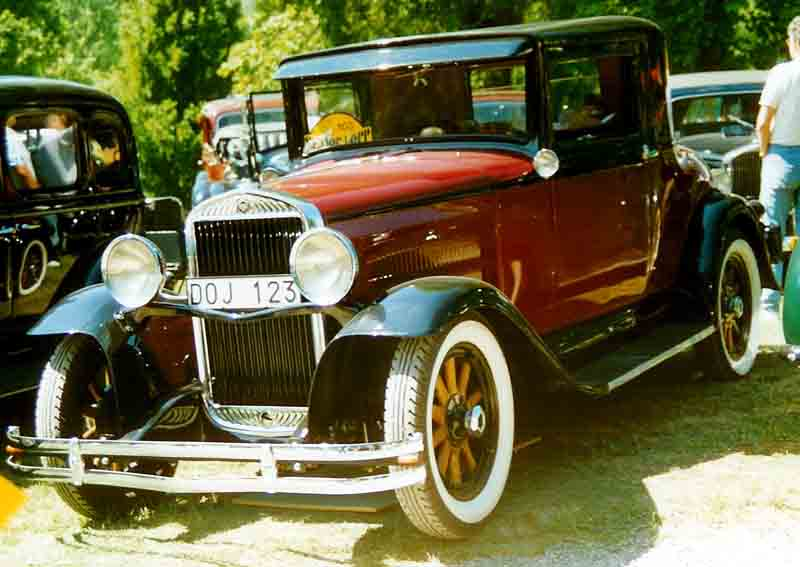
1930 Essex Super Six Model E Coupé

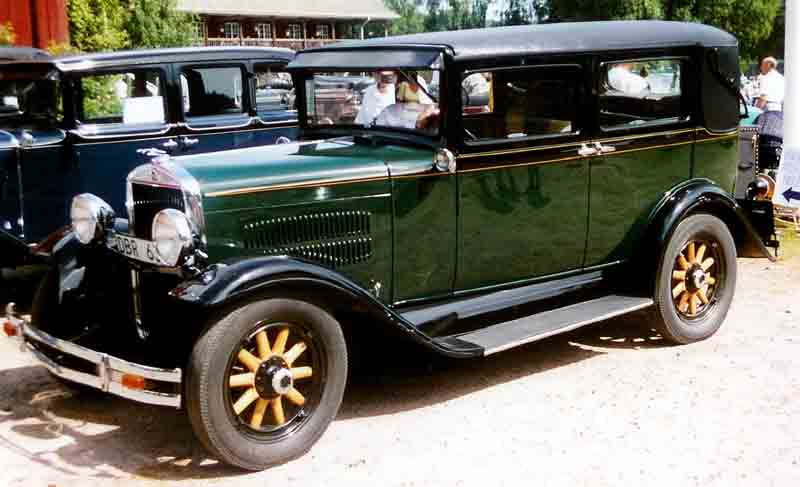
1930 Essex Super Six Model E 4-Door Sedan

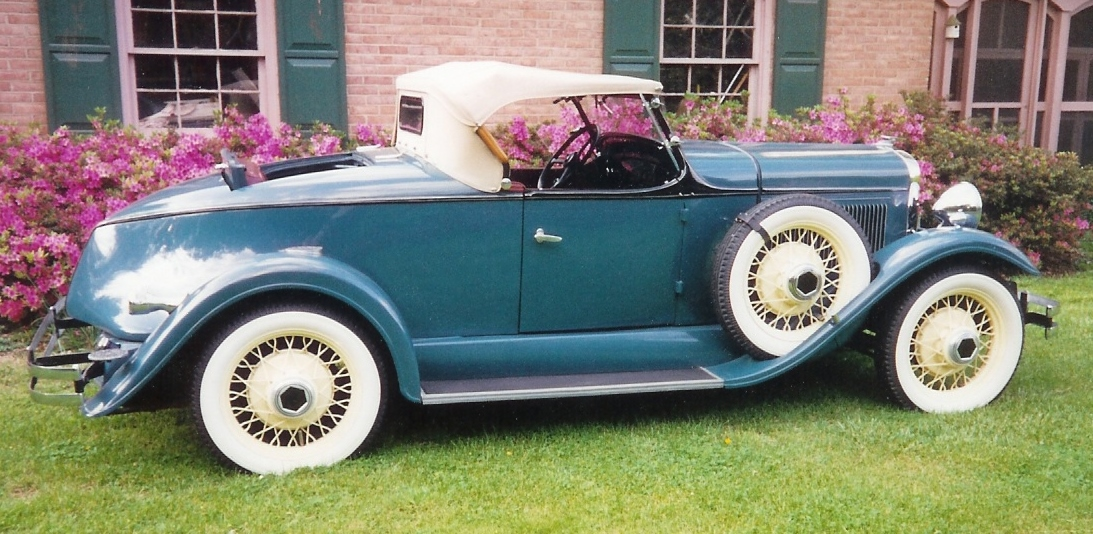
1931 Essex "Boattail"
