= List of Holden vehicles =

Holden was an Australian division of General Motors (GM), an automobile marque from 1948 to 2021.

== Holden ==
Exterior	Name	Year Introduced	Year Discontinued	Platforms	Generation	Vehicle Information
	Holden	1948	1984		5	Mid-size car Full-size car
	Utility	1951	2000	V (1990–2000)	6	Coupé utility
	Panel Van	1953	1984		5	Panel van
	Business	1953	1960		2	Mid-size car
	Special	1953	1968		5	Mid-size car
	Standard	1953	1968		5	Mid-size car
	Premier	1962	1980		3	Mid-size car Full-size car
	Torana	1967	1980		3	Compact car Mid-size car
	Belmont	1968	1977		2	Full-size car
	Brougham	1968	1971		1	Full-size luxury car
	Monaro	1968	2006	V (2001–2006)	3	Muscle car Sports car
	Limited Edition	1976			1	Muscle car
	Kingswood	1968	1984		2	Full-size car
	One Tonner	1971	2005	V (2003–2005)	2	Cab chassis
	SS	1972			1	Sports car
	Sandman	1974	1980		1	Sports Coupé utility Sports Panel van
	Sunbird	1974	1980		1	Mid-size car
	Gemini	1975	1987	T R	2	Compact car
	GTS	1977	1979		1	Muscle car
	Commodore	1978	2020	V Zeta; E2XX	5	Mid-size car Full-size car
	Rodeo	1980	2008		3	Compact pickup truck
	Jackaroo	1981	2003		2	Mid-size SUV
	Camira	1982	1989	J	1	Mid-size car
	Shuttle	1982	1990		1	MPV
	Astra	1984	2020	T	7	Compact car
	Calais	1984	2020	V Zeta; E2XX	5	Mid-size car Full-size car
	Barina	1985	2018	M GM4200; Gamma; T200	6	Supermini
	Scurry	1985	1987		1	Microvan
	Drover	1985	1987		1	Mini SUV; Cab chassis
	Piazza	1986	1987	T	1	Sport compact
	Berlina	1988	2013	V Zeta	4	Full-size car
	Apollo	1989	1997		2	Compact car Mid-size car
	Nova	1989	1996	S	2	Compact car
	Caprice	1990	2017	V Zeta	3	Full-size luxury car
	Statesman	1990	2010	V Zeta	3	Full-size luxury car
	Calibra	1991	1997	GM2900 platform	1	Sports car
	Frontera	1995	2003		2	Mid-size SUV
	Combo	1996	2011	GM4200; Gamma	2	Van
	Vectra	1997	2005	GM2900; General Motors Epsilon	2	Mid-size car
	Suburban	1998	2001	GMT400	1	Full-size SUV
	Ute	2000	2017	V Zeta	2	Coupé utility
	Monterey	2001	2003		1	Full-size SUV
	Zafira	2001	2005	T	1	Compact MPV
	Cruze	2002	2016	Delta II (2009–2016)	2	Mini SUV; Compact car
	Adventra	2003	2006	V	1	Full-size car
	Crewman	2003	2007	V	1	Crew cab Coupé utility
	Tigra	2005	2007	Gamma	1	Retractable hardtop
	Viva	2005	2009		1	Compact car
	Captiva	2006	2017	Theta	1	Crossover SUV
	Epica	2007	2011		1	Mid-size car
	Colorado	2008	2020	GMT355; GMT700	2	Compact pickup truck Mid-size pickup truck
	Barina Spark	2009	2016	Gamma II	1	Supermini
	Volt	2012	2013	Delta II	1	Compact car
	Malibu	2013	2016	Epsilon II	1	Mid-size car
	Trax	2013	2020	Gamma	1	Mini SUV
	Cascada	2015	2017	Delta	1	Compact car
	Insignia	2015	2017	Epsilon II	1	Mid-size car
	Trailblazer	2016	2020	E2XX	1	Mid-size SUV
	Spark	2016	2018		1	Supermini
	Equinox	2017	2020	D2XX	1	Crossover SUV
	Acadia	2018	2020	C1XX	1	Mid-size SUV

== Statesman ==
Exterior	Name	Year Introduced	Year Discontinued	Platforms	Generation	Vehicle Information
	Custom	1971	1974		1	Full-size luxury car
	De Ville	1971	1985		1	Full-size luxury car
	Caprice	1974	1985		1	Full-size luxury car
	SL/E	1979			1	Full-size luxury car

== Concepts ==
- Holden Hurricane (1969)
- Holden Torana GTR-X (1970)
- Holden Torana Mystere (1977)
- Holden Coupé/Monica (1998)
- Holden ECOmmodore (2000)
- Holden Sandman (2000)
- Holden UTEster (2001)
- Holden SSX (2002)
- Holden Convertible/Marilyn (2004)
- Holden SST (2004)
- Holden Torana TT36 (2004)
- Holden Efijy (2005)
- Holden Coupe 60 (2008)

== See also ==
- List of HSV vehicles
