= AIM =

AIM or Aim may refer to:

== Arts and entertainment ==
=== Fictional entities ===
- Aim, a demon in the Ars Goetia
- Advanced Idea Mechanics, a fictional organization in Marvel Comics

=== Music ===
- AIM (album), by M.I.A., 2016
- "A.I.M.", single by the Cooper Temple Clause from Kick Up the Fire, and Let the Flames Break Loose
- "AIM", song by Tyga from the album No Introduction
- Aim (musician), a British musician, DJ and producer
- Ai Maeda (voice actress) (AiM, born 1975), Japanese singer and voice actor

== Businesses and organizations ==
=== Businesses and brands ===
- Alternative Investment Market of the London Stock Exchange
- Aim, a toothpaste brand
- AIM alliance, a partnership formed in October 1991 by Apple, IBM, and Motorola
- American Iron & Metal, a Canadian recycling company
- Fortyfive, a Japanese software developer, formerly AIM

=== Education ===
- AIM North London Academy, England
- AIM Academy, Conshohocken, Pennsylvania, US
- Asian Institute of Management, Makati, Philippines
- Assam Institute of Management, Guwahati, Assam, India
- Australian Institute of Management Education and Training, Australia

=== Musical organisations ===
- American Institute of Musicology, for early music
- Anugerah Industri Muzik, Malaysia's annual music awards ceremony
- Association of Independent Music, in the UK
- Australian Institute of Music, Sydney

=== Other organizations ===
- Accuracy in Media, a conservative American watchdog
- Adult Industry Medical Health Care Foundation, former American non-profit
- Adventures In Missions (Texas), an American Christian program
- Africa Inland Mission, a Christian mission
- Agape International Missions, combating sex trafficking in Cambodia
- Alliance for Independent Madhesh, in Nepal
- Alzheimer's Impact Movement, an affilate of the Alzheimer's Association
- American Identity Movement, a white nationalist movement, now Identity Evropa
- American Indian Movement
- American Institute of Mathematics
- Association for Automatic Identification and Mobility, in the US
- Association of Independent Museums, in the UK
- Australian Indigenous Ministries, formerly Aborigines Inland Mission

== Science and technology ==
=== Computing ===
- AIM (software), AOL Instant Messenger (1997–2017)
- AIM-65, a 1978 Rockwell computer model

=== Military and weapons ===
- Abrams Integrated Management, an upgrade to the M1 Abrams tank
- Airborne intercept missile, US DoD designation for air-to-air missiles such as AIM-7 Sparrow
- Authoring Instructional Materials, US Navy training management system
- Pistol Mitralieră model 1963/1965 (AIM, AIMS), Model 63, 65, 90 assault rifles
- Pușcă Automată model 1986 (AIMS-74), Model 86 automatic rifle

=== Other uses in science and technology ===
- Aeronomy of Ice in the Mesosphere, a NASA satellite launched in 2007
- Ancestry-informative marker, in genetics
- Apoptosis inhibitor of macrophage, a human protein
- Asteroid Impact Mission, a cancelled space project

== Transportation ==
- AIM (motorcycle), built in Italy 1974–1982
- Aeronautical Information Manual, for North American flights

== Other uses ==
- aim (trigraph), in French
- Aboriginal and Islander Message, an Australian newspaper (1979–1982)
- Arena International Master, a FIDE chess arena title
- Accusation in a mirror, a hate speech incitement technique
- Affect infusion model, in human psychology

== See also ==
- AIMS (disambiguation)
- Ain
- Aiming point, in field artillery
- Artificial intelligence in marketing
- Metric space aimed at its subspace, in mathematics
