= AIMS =

AIMS or Aims may refer to:

== Computing ==
- Advanced Impact Media Solutions, a software package used by Team Jorge to help spread disinformation
- Agricultural Information Management Standards, a web portal managed by the Food and Agriculture Organization of the United Nations
- Airplane Information Management System, the "brains" of Boeing 777 aircraft
- Anesthesia Information Management System, an information technology system used as an electronic anesthesia record

== Education ==
- Acharya Institute of Management and Sciences, Bangalore, Karnataka, India
- Adventist International Mission School, Muak Lek, Thailand
- African Institute for Mathematical Sciences, Cape Town, South Africa
- Aims Community College, Colorado US
- American Indian Model Schools, a charter school system based in Oakland, California
- Amrita Institute of Medical Sciences, Kochi, Kerala, India
- Arabic Immersion Magnet School, Houston, Texas, US
- Arizona's Instrument to Measure Standards, a standardized test administered by the state of Arizona, US
- Asian Institute of Maritime Studies, a campus in Pasay, Philippines
- Australian Institute of Marine Science, a tropical marine research centre located primarily at Cape Ferguson, Queensland

== Music ==
- Aims (album), by Vienna Teng

== Organisations ==
- Afghanistan Information Management Services
- All India Meo Sabha, an Indian advocacy group
- Associated Iron Moulders of Scotland, a defunct trade union
- Association of International Marathons and Distance Races
- Association of Internes and Medical Students
- Atlantic Institute for Market Studies, a Canadian conservative thinktank

== Sports ==
- Alabama International Motor Speedway (now Talladega Superspeedway), US
- Alliance of Independent Recognised Members of Sport, an affiliate of the SportAccord
- Australian International Motor Show

== Psychopharmacology ==
- Abnormal Involuntary Movement Scale, a test issued in psychopharmacology

== See also ==
- AIIMS
- AIM (disambiguation)
