= Holden UTEster =

Concept convertible utility developed by Holden

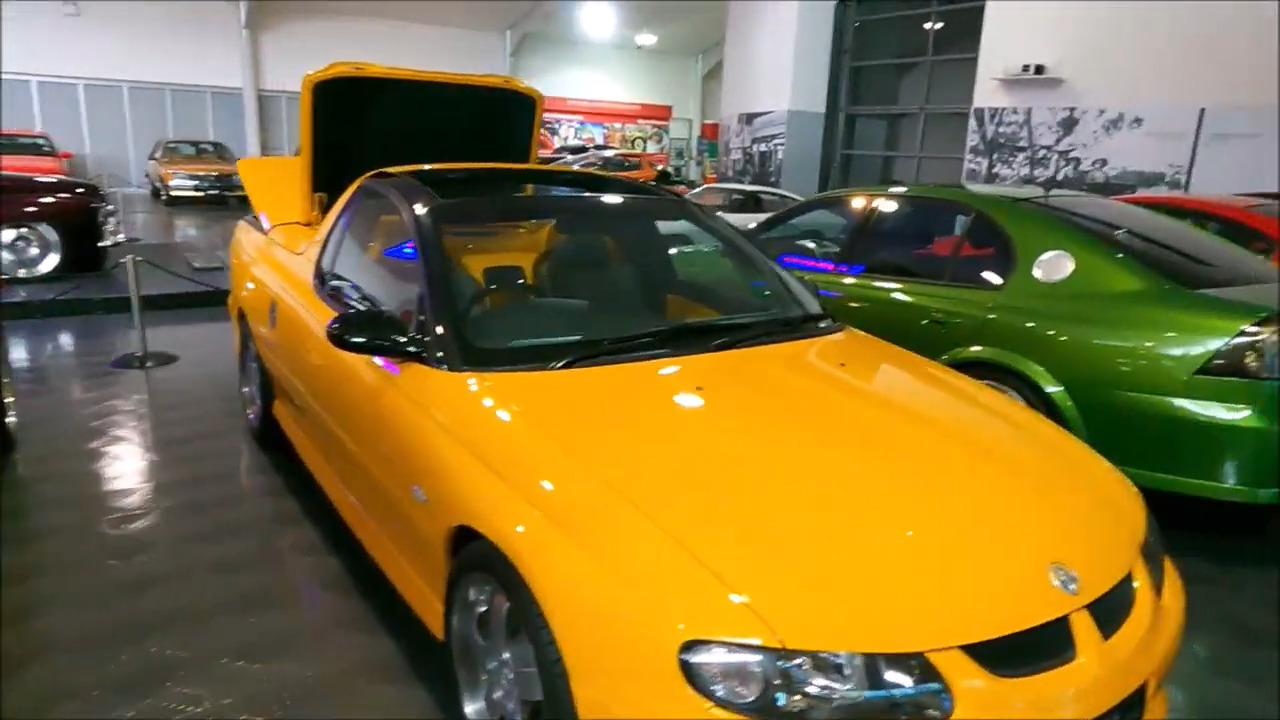

Overview
- Manufacturer: Holden
- Production: 2001 (concept)
- Designer: Peter Hughes

Body and chassis
- Class: Light commercial vehicle
- Body style: Convertible coupé utility
- Related: Holden Ute

The Holden UTEster is a concept car produced by Holden, unveiled at the 2001 Melbourne Motor Show. Holden worked in conjunction with Car Tech and Paratus to create the UTEster. It was a convertible (targa top) coupé utility model based on the Holden Ute. The name is a portmanteau of ute and roadster.

The UTEster's interior and exterior had a yellow and black theme. It featured 19-inch wheels and an Alpine entertainment system. The decklid was a split fold design, with the front section used for holding the removable top and rear glass panels and the rear section used as a traditional cargo bed.
