= Adventures In Missions =

Adventures In Missions may refer to:

- Adventures In Missions (Georgia), a Christian mission program founded by Seth Barnes in 1989; see Timeline of Christian missions
- Adventures In Missions (Texas), a Christian mission program founded by students of the Sunset International Bible Institute in 1973
