= Holden SST =

Concept step-side utility developed by Holden

Overview
- Manufacturer: Holden (General Motors)
- Production: 2004
- Designer: Jeff Haggarty

Body and chassis
- Body style: Step-side utility

Powertrain
- Engine: 225 kW (300 bhp) V8

The Holden SST was a one-off concept car produced by Holden, unveiled at the Melbourne Motor Show in 2004. The SST had a step-side utility design and was based on the Holden One-Tonner. The SST was fitted with 18-inch front wheels and 19-inch rear wheels. Power was provided by the Generation III V8 engine used in other Holden models. The design of the rear of the car differed from the production Holden Ute at the time with a moulded Holden logo in the tailgate and stacked, twin circular tail lights.

The SST was a result of Holden's efforts to emphasise the versatility of the then-new One-Tonner in late-2003 and the project was completed in under two months.
