= Holden Efijy =

Concept car developed by Holden

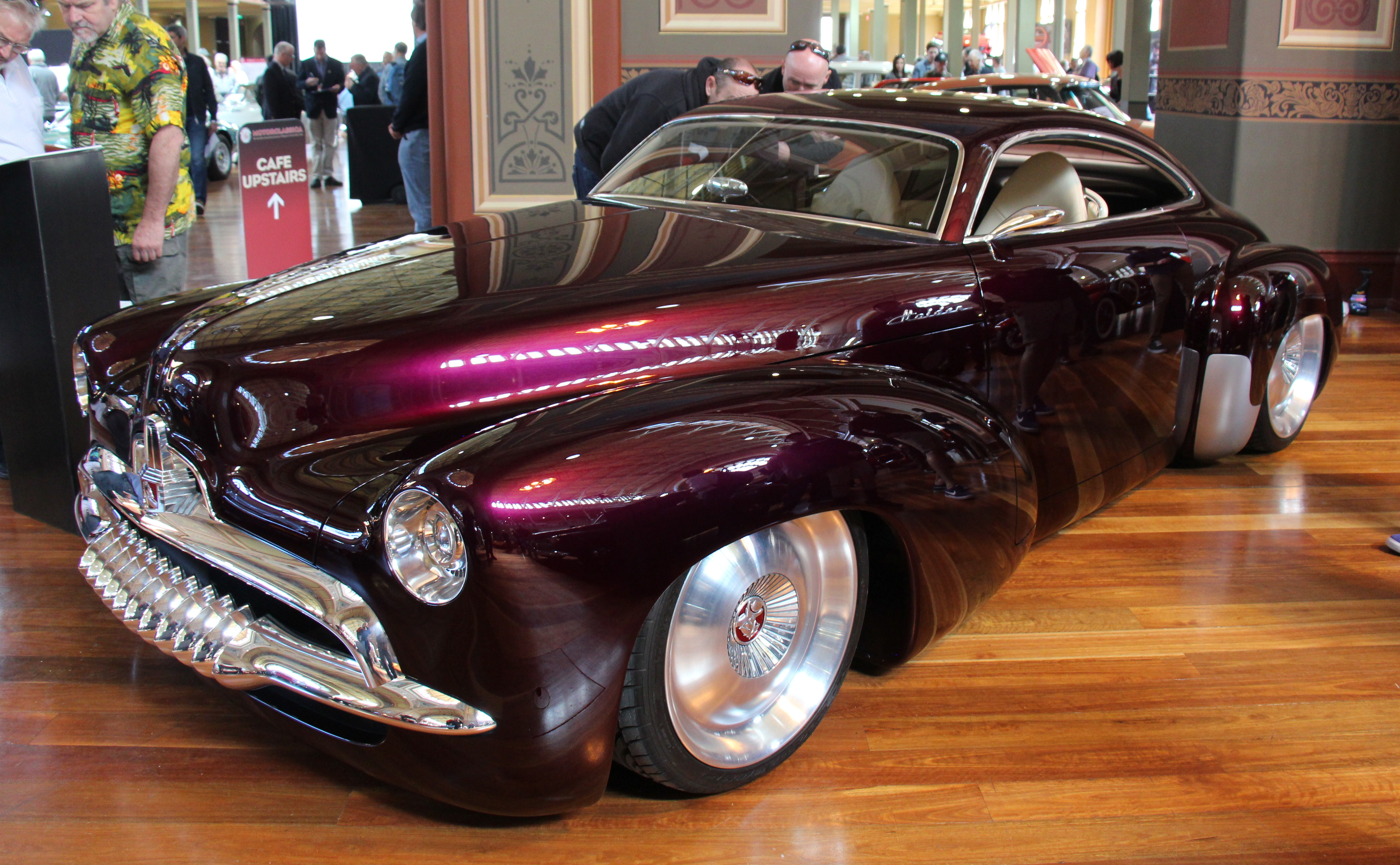

Overview
- Manufacturer: Holden
- Production: 2005
- Designer: Richard Ferlazzo

Body and chassis
- Layout: FR layout
- Related: Chevrolet Corvette

Powertrain
- Engine: 6.0 L supercharged LS2 V8
- Transmission: 4-speed automatic

Dimensions
- Wheelbase: 116 in (2,946 mm)

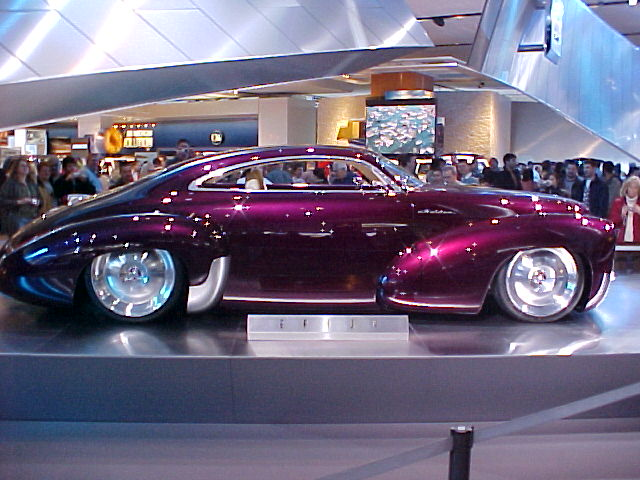
Side view of the Holden Efijy at the 2007 North American International Auto Show.

The Holden Efijy is an Australian concept car made by Holden and inspired by the Australian-built 1953 Holden FJ. It debuted in 2005 at the Australian International Motor Show.

== Design ==
The design of the Efijy pays tribute to the 1953 Holden FJ, the second Holden model, The concept was designed and built entirely in house at GM Holden's Australian design studio and engineering department. The project was overseen by Holden chief designer Richard Ferlazzo. It is painted in a “Soprano Purple” paint colour and features bright work handmade from billet aluminium.

== Specifications ==
The Efijy is based on a lengthened Chevrolet Corvette floor pan and features a 6.0 litre LS2 V8 engine with a Roots supercharger producing 480 kW (644 hp) at 6,400 rpm and 560 lb-ft of torque at 4,200 rpm. Power goes to the rear wheels through a rear-mounted 4-speed 4L60E automatic transmission with a limited-slip differential. The exhaust is a fully custom, stainless steel unit and features billet aluminium exhaust tips. It rides on an air suspension system that lowers the car when it is stopped, and also has electronic instrumentation, including a multi-use display screen that disappears into the dash.

Since its debut showing at The Australian International Motor Show in 2005, the Holden Efijy has been named the United States concept car of the year for 2007. Once it returned to Australia, the Efijy visited the National Motor Museum at Birdwood, South Australia, in February 2008 and again from December 2020 as part of the Holden Heroes exhibition along with 12 other significant Holden production and concept vehicles.

== Appearances ==
- 2005 - The Australian International Motor Show
- 2008 - The National Motor Museum
- 2020 - The National Motor Museum for the Holden Heroes exhibition
- 2025 - The State Library of South Australia for the Rear Vision: Holden Collection exhibition

== Gallery ==
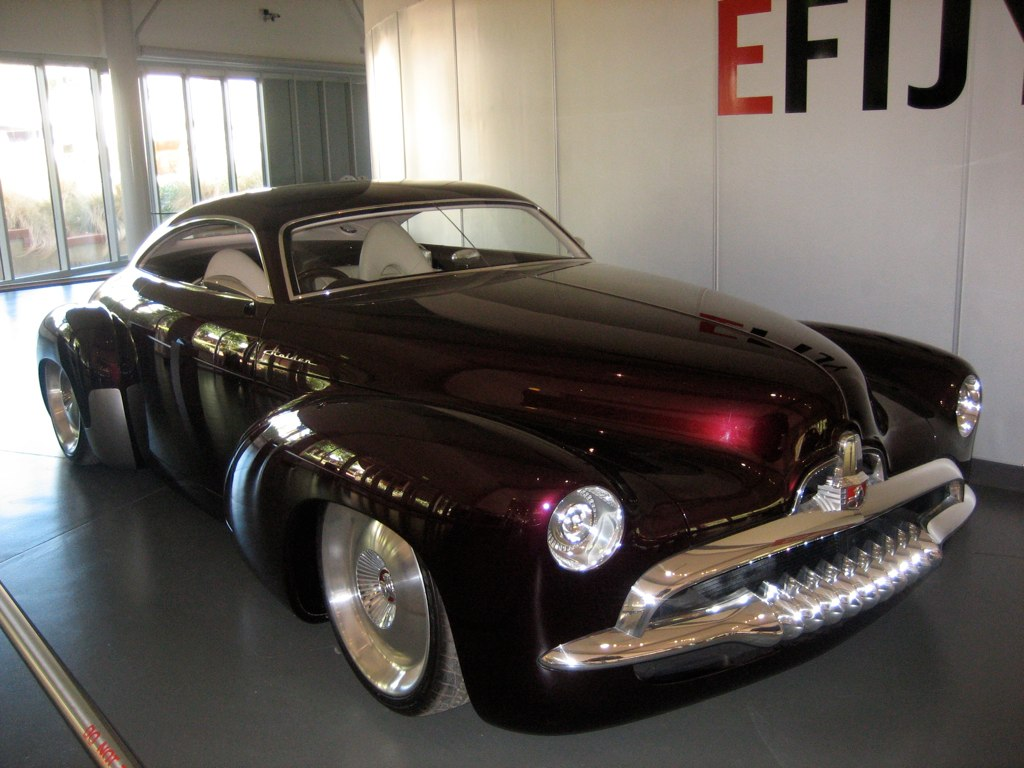
Holden Efijy at the National Motor Museum, Birdwood, South Australia.

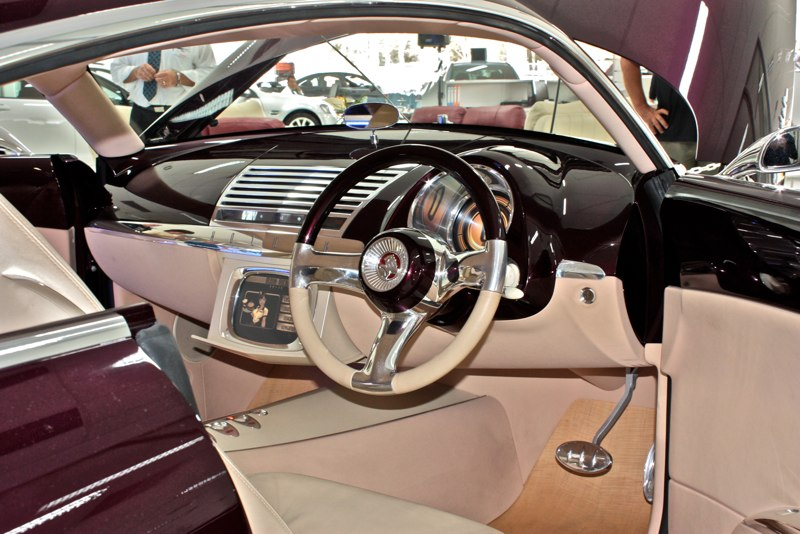
Interior view of the Holden Efijy showing the drop down display.

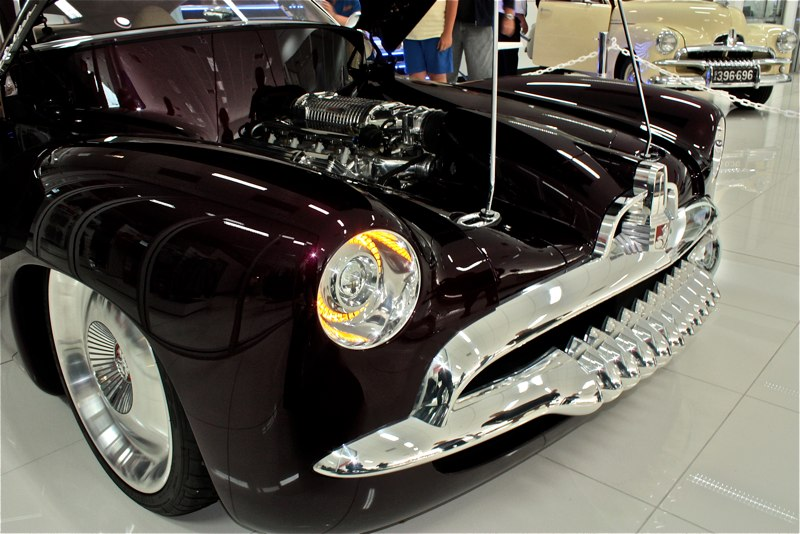
Bonnet up view of the Holden Efijy showing the Roots Supercharger.

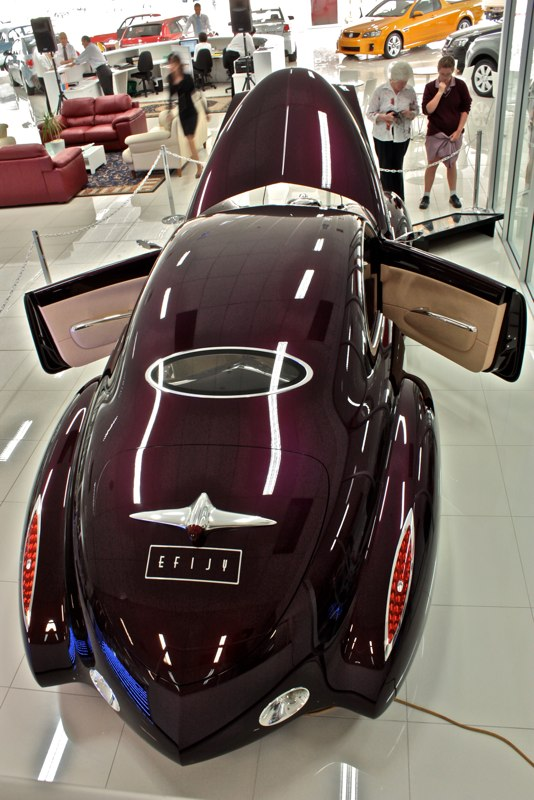
Top view of the Holden Efijy during visit to Holden Metro in Adelaide.

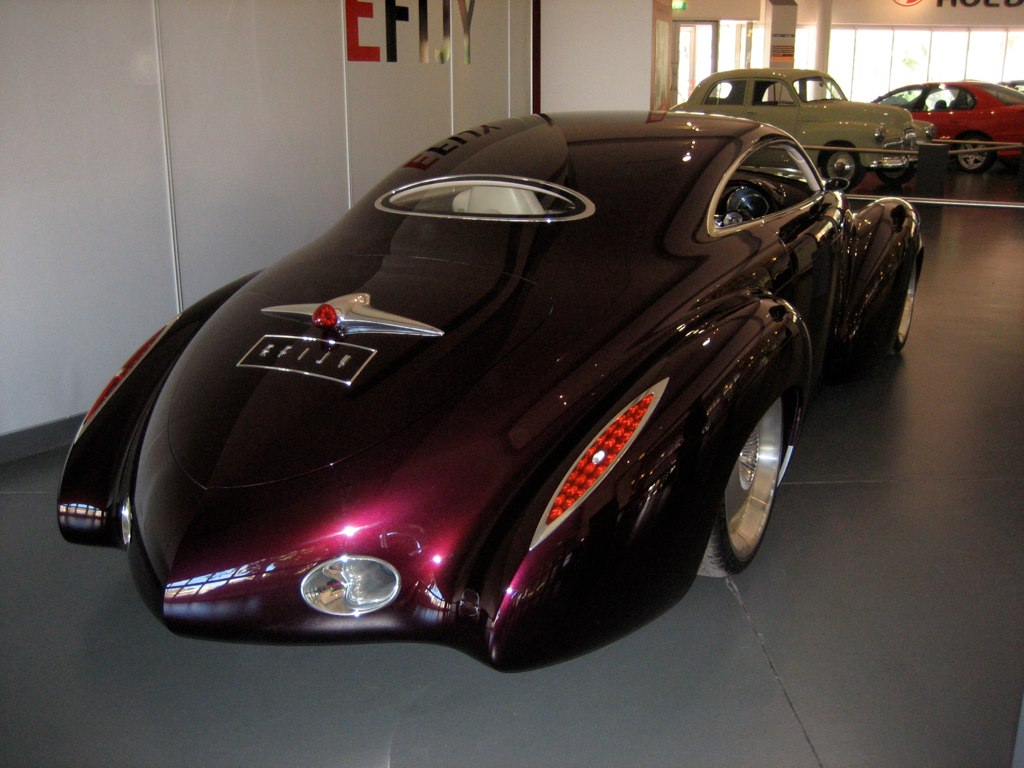
Rear view of the Holden Efijy at the National Motor Museum, Birdwood, South Australia.
