= Holden Coupe 60 =

Concept car developed by Holden

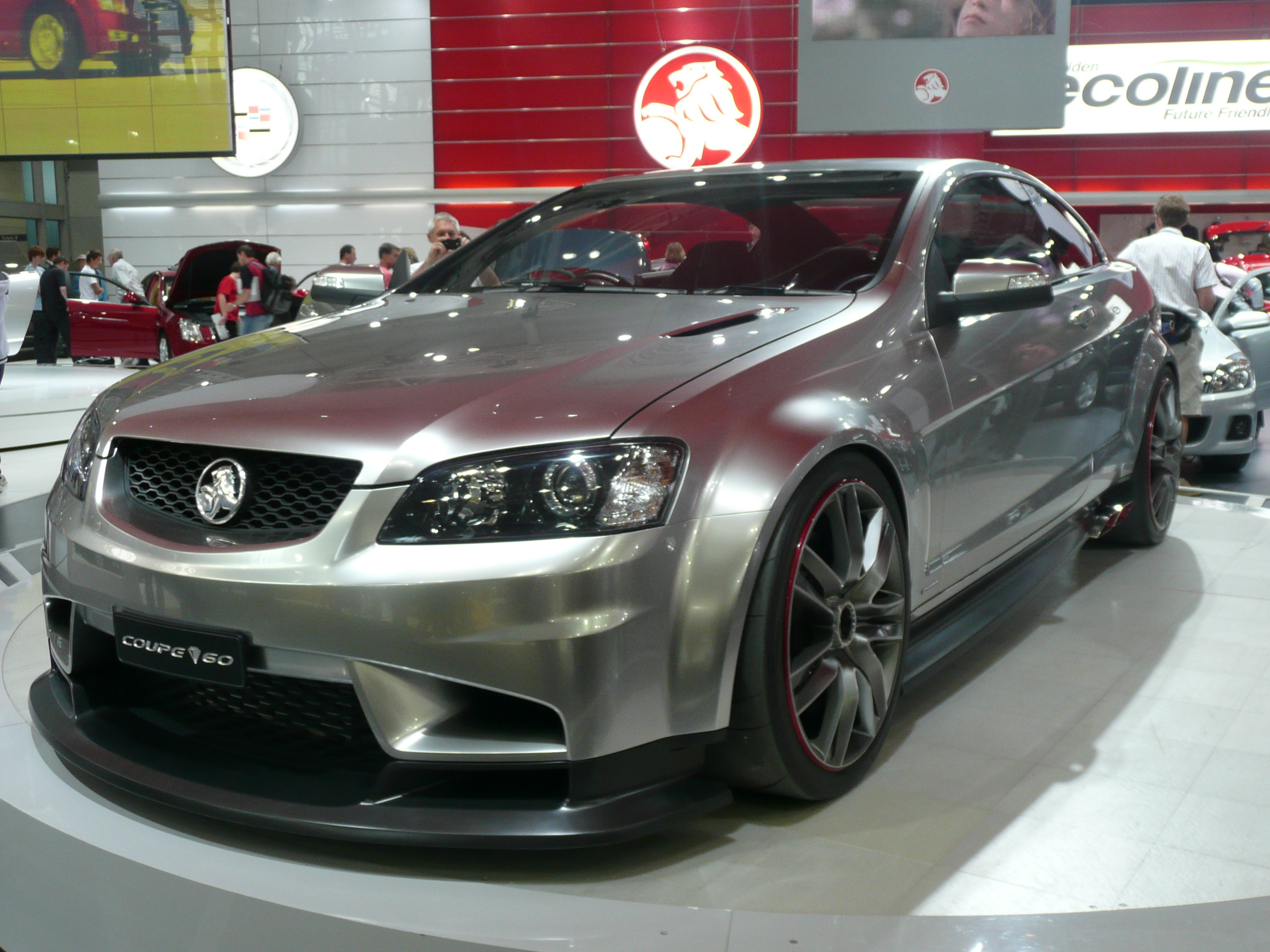

Overview
- Manufacturer: Holden
- Production: 2008 (concept car)
- Designer: Ewan Kingsbury under Tony Stolfo

Body and chassis
- Class: Grand tourer Coupe
- Body style: 2-door coupé
- Layout: Front-engine, rear-wheel drive
- Platform: GM Zeta
- Related: Holden Commodore (VE); Chevrolet Camaro (fifth generation)

Powertrain
- Engine: 6.0 L LS2 V8
- Transmission: 6-speed manual

Dimensions
- Wheelbase: 2,858 mm (112.5 in)
- Length: 4,837 mm (190.4 in)
- Width: 1,895 mm (74.6 in)
- Height: 1,400 mm (55.1 in)

The Holden Coupe 60 is a concept sports coupe developed by Holden. It was unveiled at the 2008 Melbourne International Motor Show, alongside the HSV W427.

It featured a pillarless design, and utilised Holden's rear-wheel drive Zeta platform.

It celebrates six decades since Holden built the Holden 48-215 at the Fishermans Bend plant in Port Melbourne, Victoria. It cost AU$2.5 million to manufacture.

== Specifications ==
The Coupe 60 features included: a rear-diffuser, front-splitter and carbon-fibre spoiler, and 21-inch centre-lock alloy wheels with unique design and Kumho high performance semi-slick tyres. It was powered by a 6.0-litre LS2 V8, with Active Fuel Management and ethanol (E85) capabilities. Coupled to the same six-speed manual transmission, the engine produced 275 kW (369 hp) and 540 N⋅m (398 lb⋅ft) of torque.
