= Holden ECOmmodore =

Hybrid concept car developed by Holden

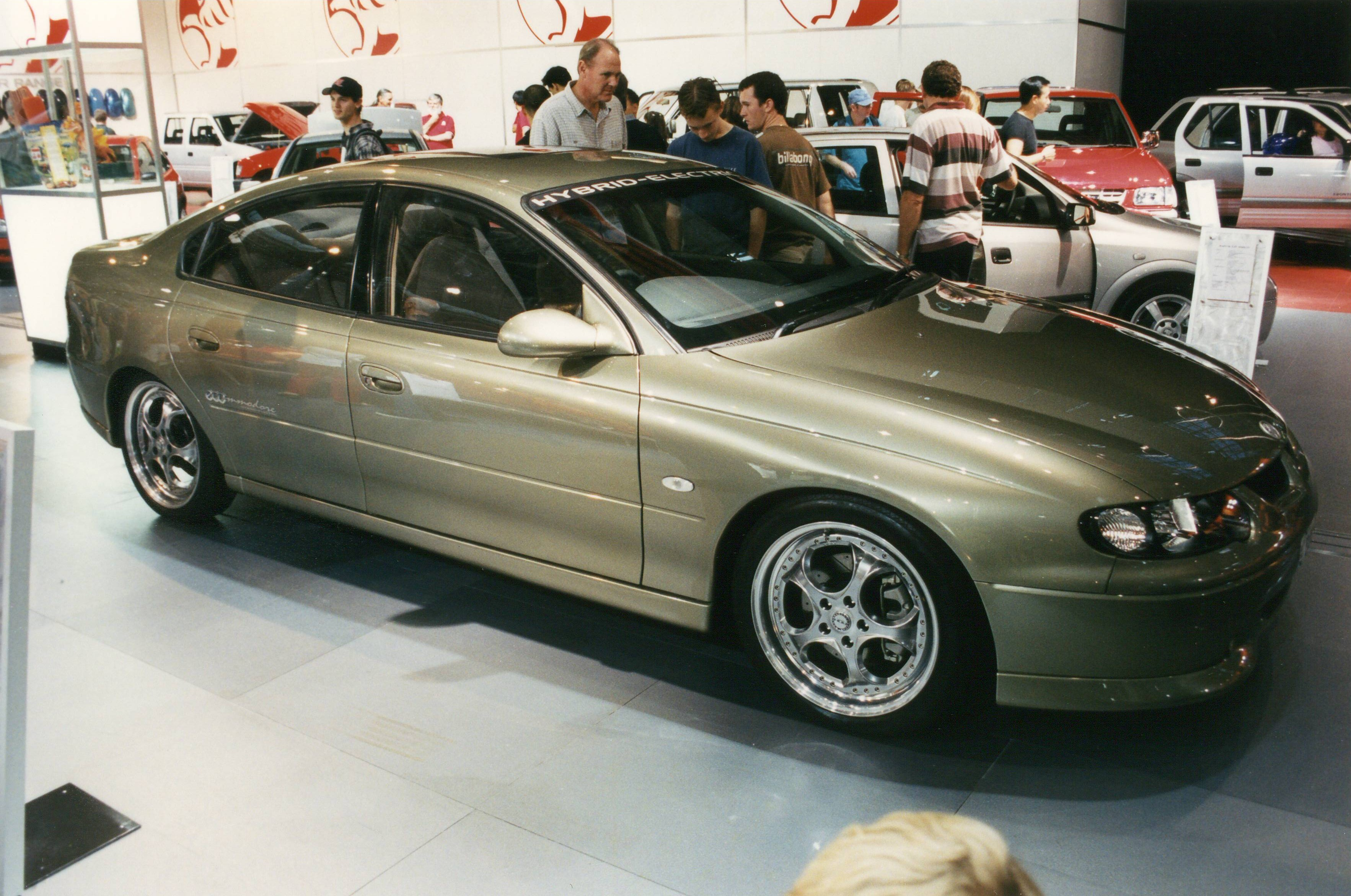

Overview
- Manufacturer: Holden
- Production: 2000 (concept)

Body and chassis
- Class: Full-size car
- Body style: 4-door fastback sedan
- Layout: Front-engine, front-wheel drive
- Platform: GM V Platform

Powertrain
- Engine: Petrol hybrid: 2.0 L GM Family II engine I4
- Transmission: 5-speed manual

The Holden ECOmmodore is a hybrid concept car based on the Holden Commodore (VT), developed by Holden in conjunction with the CSIRO. It was first unveiled at the 2000 Melbourne International Motor Show. It was utilised during the 2000 Summer Olympics to for transport during the Torch Relay.

It was a sedan with fastback profile, and utilised the longer wheelbase of the wagon. It also previewed a revised headlamp design that would be later adopted on the VX Commodore, which replaced the VT in October 2000.

The Ecommodore was powered by a 2.0-litre inline-four petrol GM Family II engine producing 95 kW (127 hp), combined with an electric motor producing 40 kW (54 hp) and 100 N⋅m (74 lb⋅ft) of torque, running on lead-acid batteries, it had a combined torque of 290 N⋅m (214 lb⋅ft), and was coupled to a 5-speed manual transmission.

It had a drag coefficient of Cd=0.26 compared to the VT series II's drag coefficient of Cd=0.32, with a fuel economy of about 5.6L/100km.
