= AIM North London Academy =

AIM Academy North London
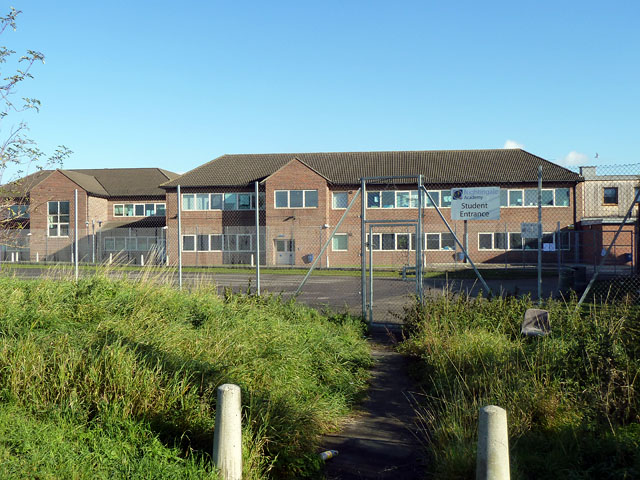
- Photo from 2012 when the school was Nightingale Academy

Location
- Turin Road; Edmonton, Greater London, N9 8DQ; England; 51°38′01″N 0°02′46″W

Information
- Type: Academy
- Department for Education URN: 147536 Tables
- Ofsted: Reports
- Headteacher: Paddy McGrath
- Gender: Mixed
- Age: 11 to 18
- Website: www.aimnorthlondon.org.uk

AIM Academy North London is a mixed secondary school and sixth form located in the Edmonton area of the London Borough of Enfield, England.

Originally known as Cuckoo Hall Secondary Modern school, it merged with the Houndsfield and Eldon secondary modern schools to become Mandeville Secondary Comprehensive School in 1967, becoming Salisbury School and then Turin Grove School. The school reopened in 2010 as Nightingale Academy; Nightingale was one of the first Mayor's academies to be established in London.

Nightingale Academy was judged “inadequate” by Ofsted and the school was then sponsored by AIM Academies Trust. It became AIM North London Academy in 2019 with Paddy McGrath as its first Principal. Clare Darley is the current Principal.

The school serves students aged 11-19, offering GCSEs and A Levels.

== Lineage ==
AIM Academy North London lineage
pre-1968	1968		1980s	1990s	2010	2019
Houndsfield Secondary Modern School (from 1947)	Houndsfield Comprehensive School (pupils aged 11–14)	Mandeville Comprehensive School (upper school for pupils from Eldon and Houndsfield, aged 14+) Formerly Cuckoo Hall School	Salisbury School	Turin Grove School	Nightingale Academy	AIM Academy North London
Eldon Secondary Modern School (from 1927)	Houndsfield Comprehensive School (pupils aged 11–14)	Mandeville Comprehensive School (upper school for pupils from Eldon and Houndsfield, aged 14+) Formerly Cuckoo Hall School	Salisbury School	Turin Grove School	Nightingale Academy	AIM Academy North London
Eldon Secondary Modern School (from 1927)	Eldon Comprehensive School (pupils aged 11–14)	Mandeville Comprehensive School (upper school for pupils from Eldon and Houndsfield, aged 14+) Formerly Cuckoo Hall School	Salisbury School	Turin Grove School	Nightingale Academy	AIM Academy North London
Cuckoo Hall Secondary Modern School (from 1949)	Eldon Comprehensive School (pupils aged 11–14)	Mandeville Comprehensive School (upper school for pupils from Eldon and Houndsfield, aged 14+) Formerly Cuckoo Hall School	Salisbury School	Turin Grove School	Nightingale Academy	AIM Academy North London
