= Afghanistan Information Management Services =

Afghan non-governmental organisation

Afghanistan Information Management Services (AIMS) is a Kabul-based Afghan non-governmental organisation (NGO). It specialises in the application of information, communication and technology (Information Communication Technology) solutions, software development, and project management.

== Background ==
In 1997, AIMS was established under the United Nations Office for the Coordination of Humanitarian Affairs (UNOCHA) in Islamabad, Pakistan, to serve the information management needs of Afghanistan. In 2001, it was relocated to Kabul and became a project of the United Nations Development Programme (UNDP). Since its inception, AIMS has served the Government of Afghanistan, non-governmental organizations and the international donor community as a provider of information management services including the development of software applications, database solutions, geospatial information and maps.

AIMS is located in a new office facility in Kabul, and in 2002 AIMS established offices in five regional centers: Jalalabad, Kandahar, Herat, Mazar-i-Sharif, and Kunduz. The regional offices provide services in information management, capacity development (i.e. job training), and mapping.

In 2004, AIMS shifted its focus from simple data provision to the development of information management capacity in the Government of the Islamic Republic of Afghanistan (GIRoA) and the broader humanitarian community, especially in the areas of Geographic Information Systems GIS and database development.

In September 2008, it transitioned from being a UNDP project into a national NGO as authorized by a Memorandum of Agreement between UNDP and the Ministry of Communications and Information Technology (MoCIT). The AIMS Transition Plan and Official Charter were authored by J. Brown (International Development Advisor) and Lisa Gomer (International Attorney). The Executive Director for AIMS at the time of the Charter was Neal Bratschun. Mr. J Nicholas Martyn was the 1st Executive Directory retained by AIMS to lead the organization.

AIMS served as a certified training site for ESRI and authored multiple software solutions for the International Development Community such as GEOBASE, and PIMSS.
