= Association of Internes and Medical Students =

The Association of Internes and Medical Students (AIMS) was an American progressive political and social organization composed of medical students and interns, advocating for issues such as national health insurance, anti-discrimination in medical schools, and salaries for interns. The organization was established in 1941, formed by the merger of two predecessor organizations: the Interne Council of America (ICA), founded in 1934 as the Interne Council of Greater New York, and the Association of Medical Students (AMS), founded in 1937. AIMS published The Interne, which absorbed the AMS' Journal of the Association of Medical Students.

The AIMS was at odds with the older American Medical Association (AMA) on some issues, especially national health care. In 1948, during the Second Red Scare, the AMA attacked AIMS for "exhibiting communistic tendencies" and by 1952 AIMS and its publication were defunct, a victim of shrinking membership and anti-communist McCarthyism.

Leaders of AIMS included Walter Lear, Lewis Rowland, Arthur Sackler, and Henry Sigerist.
