= Authoring Instructional Materials =

Management system

AIM was developed for and is primarily used by the United States Navy

Authoring Instructional Materials (AIM) is a management system consisting of a set of commercial and government software used by the United States Navy for the development and design of training curricula and instructional content.

First proposed in the 1970s, AIM was designed to maximize the efficiency of the curriculum development process through the use of computer-based automation tools. Currently, over 300,000 hours of the Navy's instructional materials exist using the AIM system.

AIM comprises the toolsets AIM I and AIM II, which were developed for the Personal Performance Profile approach and the Task Based approach respectively. AIM II stores training content on a SQL server, serving as a relational database for managing the relationships between instructional material elements. PDF, XML and HTML are available as content outputs.

Newer versions of AIM include the Content Planning Module (CPM) and Learning Object (LO) Module. The modules incorporate data from the Job Duty Task Analysis (JDTA) process, which aids the revision and creation of training programs. The latest version of the system is AIM 5.0.

== History ==
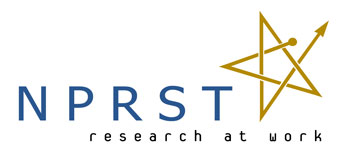
Initial R&D for AIM was performed by the NPRST division of the United States Bureau of Naval Personnel.

The idea of AIM was first proposed in the 1970s, and development of the system began in the 1980s. In the 1980s, AIM was introduced as an Operational Requirement by the Chief of Naval Education and Training (CNET) and initial R&D was performed by the Navy Personnel Research, Studies, and Technology (NPRST) division.

The toolsets AIM I and AIM II were first released between 1987 and 1997. An updated version of AIM, integrating the new CPM and LO modules, was developed between 2006 and 2012. According to the Naval Air Warfare Center Training Systems Division (NAWCTSD), AIM as a system for streamlining curriculum development was able to reduce the "number of hours spent for development of new training materials by as much as 25% and for maintenance of existing materials by as much as 50%."

The system is currently managed by NAWCTSD, while development and primary support for AIM is provided by the computer software firm Carley Corporation
