= Adventures In Missions (Texas) =

Christian apprentice missions program

AIM logo

Adventures In Missions (AIM) is a Christian apprentice missions program for college-age young people. The program is a part of Sunset International Bible Institute (SIBI) in Lubbock, Texas. Those accepted into the program spend eight months in studying and training at SIBI before being sent to mission fields around the world for a period of 14 to 22 months.

== History ==
In October 1973, sixteen young people came to Sunset International Bible Institute, which was called "Sunset School of Preaching" at the time, to be trained in Christian evangelism and mission work. These first students went as a team to Dublin, Ireland for their field service time. "Sunset School of Preaching" (SSOP) is what brought AIM alive. Cline Paden started SSOP (now known as Sunset International Bible Institute, SIBI) in 1962 soon after he completed missionary work. The school's purpose in the beginning was to teach motivated Spanish-speaking individuals to preach. Because of this, the school was named, "Latin American Bible School". After a period of time, the organization shifted its purpose to evangelism. Owing to the number of people joining the organization and the change of purpose, "Latin American Bible School" finally changed its name to "Adventures In Missions". In 1993 Cline Paden retired and the president position was passed to Truitt Adair. Truitt Adair has been president ever since and has continued the success of AIM.

== Program ==
Adventures In Missions operates on a schedule in which one new class of students is accepted and begins training each year. Young people interested in joining the AIM program must apply in advance. Applications are normally accepted starting in January for the class that begins in August of each year.

Accepted students move to Lubbock in August, where they are given an orientation and begin classes at SIBI. In addition to classroom study, the eight months of training in Lubbock also includes mentoring by AIM staff, opportunities for practical application outside of the classroom, weekly experience serving among area congregations, and occasional class trips for recruiting, equipping, and mission evangelism.

Starting about a month after classes begin each year, students are given presentations by visiting missionaries who desire to recruit teams from the class of students. The number of missionaries who recruit from a given class varies from year to year, but is typically between fifteen and twenty. Missionaries on fields both outside of and within the United States recruit from each year's AIM class. Following a time of prayer and reflection, each student is asked to submit his or her preferences about both the fields he or she would like to work on, as well as classmates that he or she would like to work on a team with. AIM staff members gather these preferences together and then spend over a month in prayer and collaboration forming the class into teams for specific mission fields.

In April, after the eight months of classes and training in Lubbock, the students are sent out as teams to their designated mission points around the world. During this field service time, AIM students work with experienced missionaries to spread the message of Christianity, teach children's classes, organize youth activities, serve the church, and work in humanitarian efforts. To fulfill graduation requirements, AIM requires that each student have a minimum stay of 14 months on his or her field, though many students choose to stay longer—up to 22 months or more, depending on their individual preferences.

== Purpose ==
AIM describes its purpose as spreading the knowledge of God and the Bible to others through missionary activities.

== Numbers ==
AIM has trained over 1600 students, over 1000 of whom have been sent to the mission field. In 2007, AIM stated that it had sent teams to a total of 170 mission points (100 mission points in 46 foreign countries and 70 mission points in 29 states). The average number of students accepted per year from 1973 through 2003 is 49, and from 2003 to 2006 it was 59. The 2006 class began with 62 young adults.

== AIM Alumni ==
In 2009, former AIM students started the AIM Alumni Association on Facebook. Shortly after, the AIM Alumni Association began weekly blogging as a way to encourage and challenge their peers.

== AIM Staff ==
In 2017, Cory Burns replaces Kris Smith as director of Adventures in Missions, Smith serving as director for 17 years, both former "AIMers". Previous AIM directors include Jay Jarboe, Rex Boyles and Don Solomon. Burns travels everywhere that the students travel and makes sure that the students are on top of their studies. The Aim Advancement Coordinator is Pat Sheaffer, who is also an AIM alumni. Pat helps make the decisions on where to take the students and what they will be involved in. AIM would not be the same without him as he helps the students get to their destination. Pat also goes around the nation in order to recruit other students for the next year to come. The rest of the team consists of Robby Stephens and Barb Smith. Robby Stephens is the Staff Coordinator who helps make the events happen wherever the students go. If there were to be any questions, then the person who would have the answer would be Barb Smith---the receptionist in the AIM office, located at Sunset Church of Christ.
