= Holden Ute =

Australian coupe utility

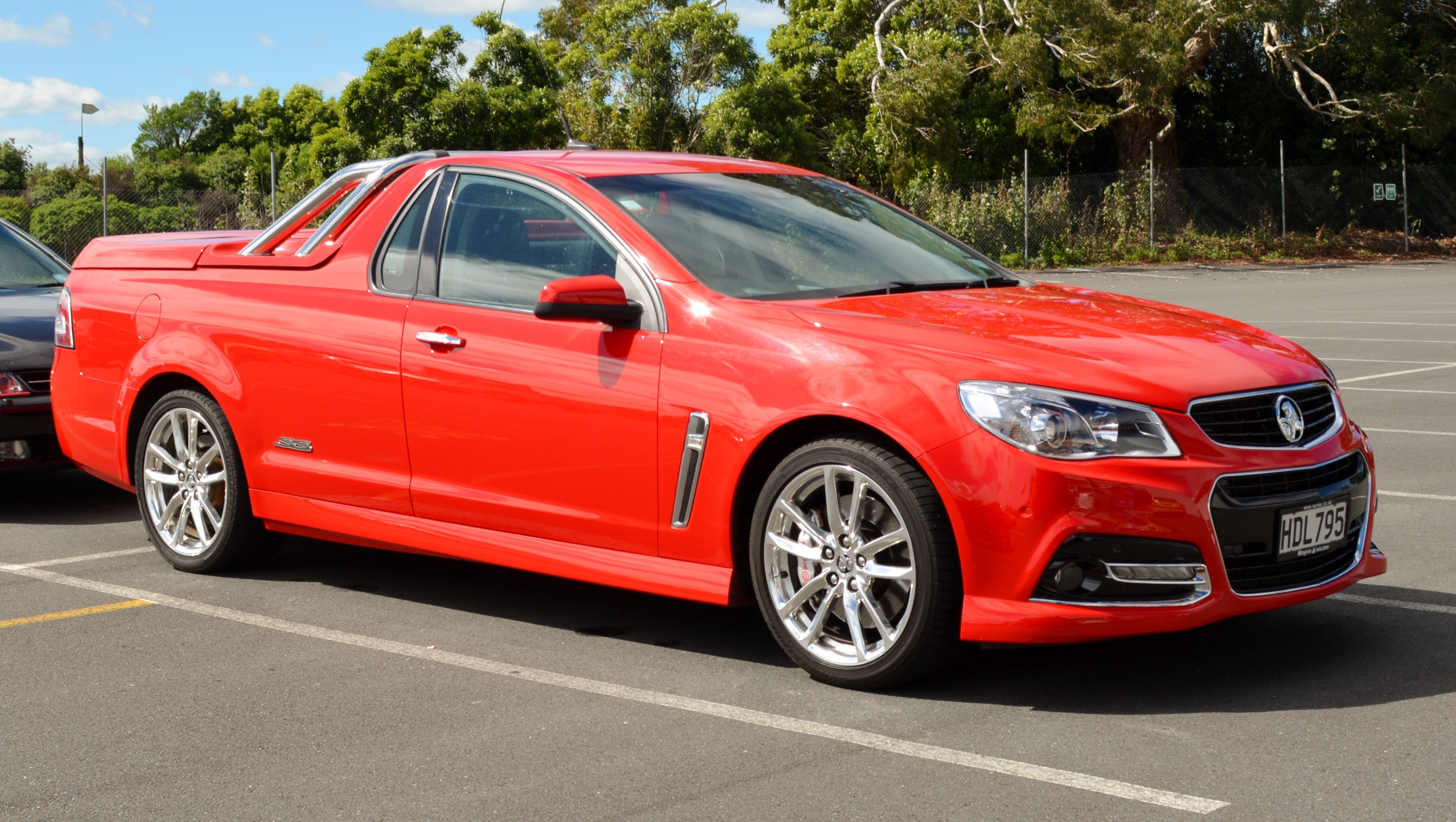

Overview
- Manufacturer: Holden
- Also called: Chevrolet Lumina UTE; Pontiac G8 ST (cancelled)
- Production: 2000–2017
- Assembly: Australia: Adelaide, South Australia (Elizabeth)

Body and chassis
- Class: Light commercial vehicle
- Body style: 2-door coupe utility; 4-door crew cab; 2-door cab chassis
- Related: Holden Commodore; Holden Crewman; Holden One Tonner; HSV Maloo

Chronology
- Predecessor: Holden Utility
- Successor: Holden Colorado

The Holden Ute is a coupe utility built by Holden, the Australian subsidiary of General Motors, from 2000 to 2017. The word "ute" is a colloquial term used commonly in Australia for 'coupe utility'. Between 2003 and 2007, Holden built a crew cab version, called the Holden Crewman and between 2003 and 2005 a cab chassis version known as the Holden One Tonner.

The VX Commodore-based Ute launched with a locally built 3.8-litre Ecotec V6 engine of Buick design. A 5.7-litre Generation III V8 engine option was also available, but this was replaced by the 6.0-litre Generation 4 in 2006, and updated to the L98 specification later on that year. In 2004, Holden replaced the V6 with a 3.6-litre Alloytec unit.

The Australian-assembled Ute was to be sold in the United States as the Pontiac G8 ST starting in 2009 alongside the four-door Commodore-based G8 sedan. However, due to GM's company-wide model review, due to the 2008 financial crisis, such plans were shelved on 6 January 2009. Exports of the G8 sedan remain unaffected. Sales of the Ute in South Africa as the Chevrolet Lumina SS commenced during 2006/2007 and in Middle East in 2009/2010, making it the first full-size Chevrolet coupé utility ever since the 1987 discontinuation of the El Camino (even though this Lumina was never sold in the USA).

== First generation (2000–2007) ==
=== VU ===
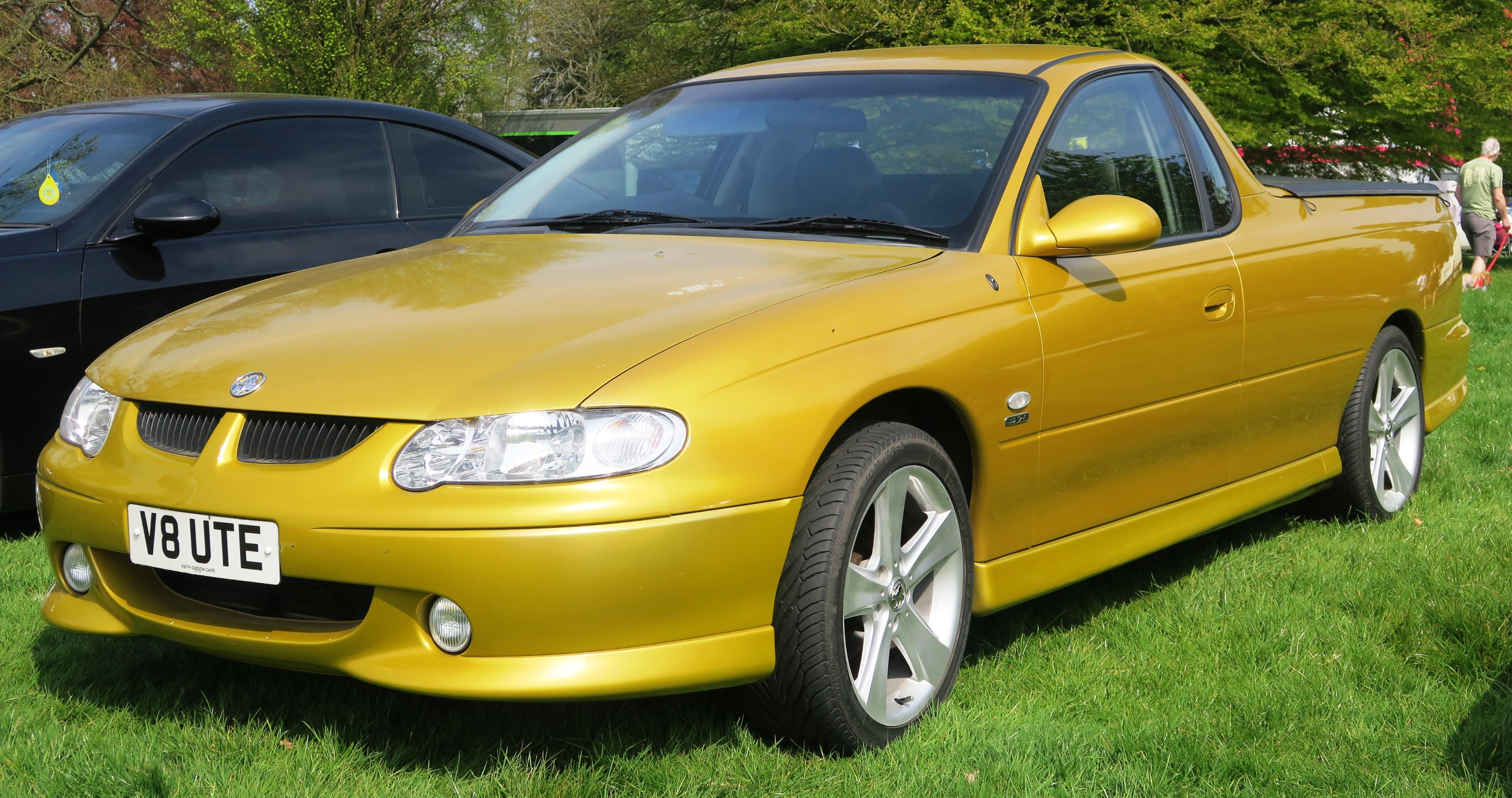
2001–2003 Holden Ute SS (VU II)

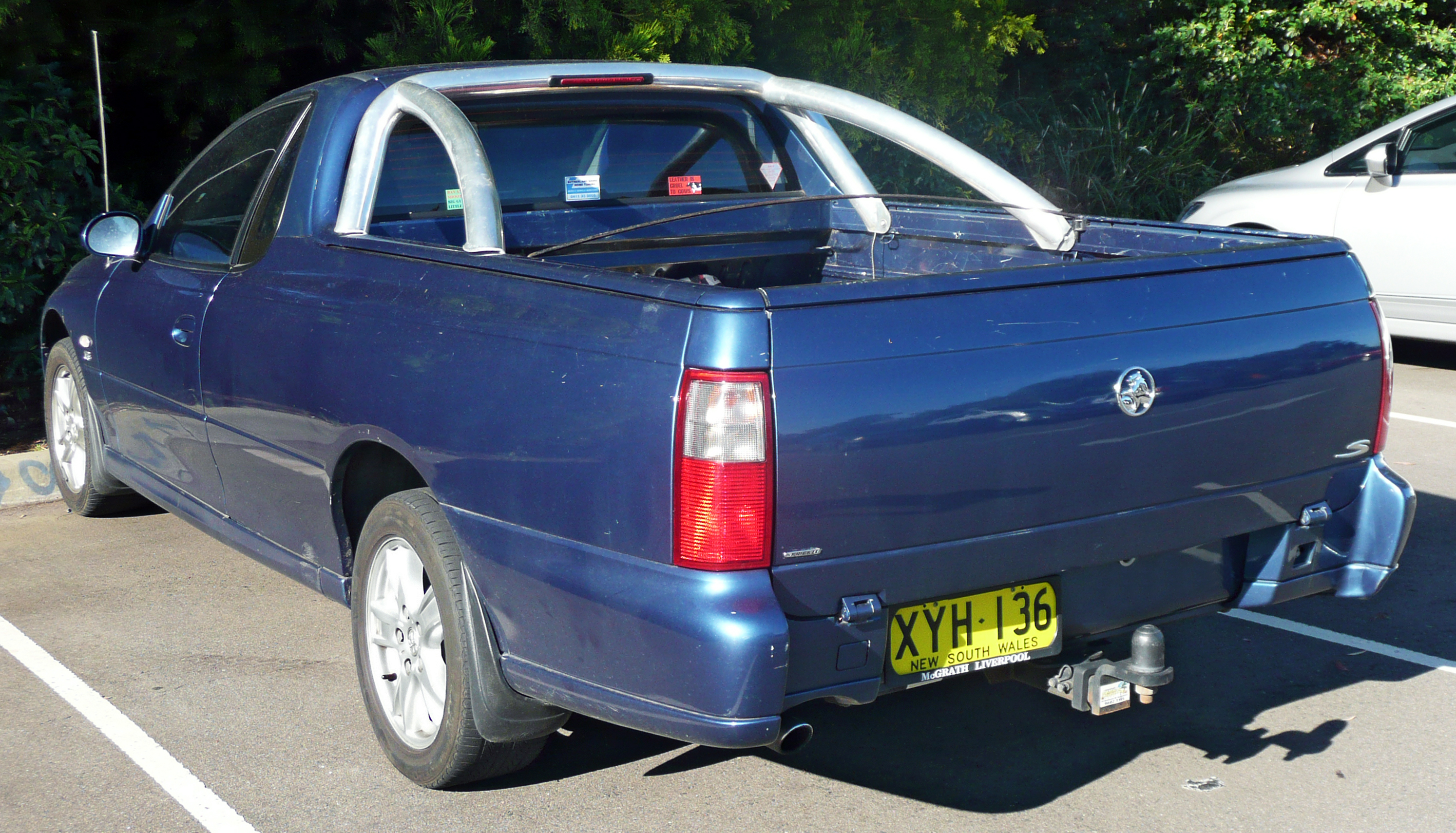
2001–2003 Holden Ute S (VU II)

Holden introduced the Ute range with the VU, replacing the Holden VS Utility. The VU's arrival was a full 36 months after the VT Commodore sedan, meaning it arrived in time for the launch of Holden's VX Commodore series. The VU utilises the same wheelbase as the VT Commodore station wagon and WH Statesman/Caprice, meaning a wheelbase increase of 116 mm (4.6 in). The Ute employs the same interior as the Commodore, while also picking up the VX's upgraded equipment lists and re-styled exterior design.

- Base : Built up from the Commodore Executive's specification. Available with 3.8-litre 152 kW (204 hp) Ecotec V6 - 4sp auto, 5sp manual or the optional 5.7-litre 225 kW (302 hp) Generation 3 V8 - 6sp manual or 4sp automatic.
- S : Based on Commodore 'S' specification. Available with 3.8-litre 152 kW (204 hp) Ecotec V6 - 4sp auto, 5sp manual speed or the optional 5.7-litre 225 kW (302 hp) Generation 3 V8 - 6sp manual or 4sp auto.
- SS : Based on Commodore SS specification, minus side-impact airbags. Available with a 5.7-litre 225 kW (302 hp) Generation 3 V8 - 6sp manual or 4sp auto

The range received a minor refresh with the VU series II, releasing alongside the VX Series II.

In October 2001 The VU Ute came out in a special edition "SS Fifty" (pictured right) to mark the 50th anniversary. This model has only 500 units produced. Every SS 50 was identical in terms of color schemes, all 500 units were released with a black exterior and a partial leather interior that contained plenty of "hyper yellow" accents. Other items that made the SS 50 different were the chrome sports bar on the back, unique black-and-yellow engine cover, a leather-wrapped steering wheel, handbrake cover and gear knob as well as a color-coded instrument cluster to match the leather bolsters on the sports seats.

The VU's were superseded by the VY range in May 2003.

=== VY ===
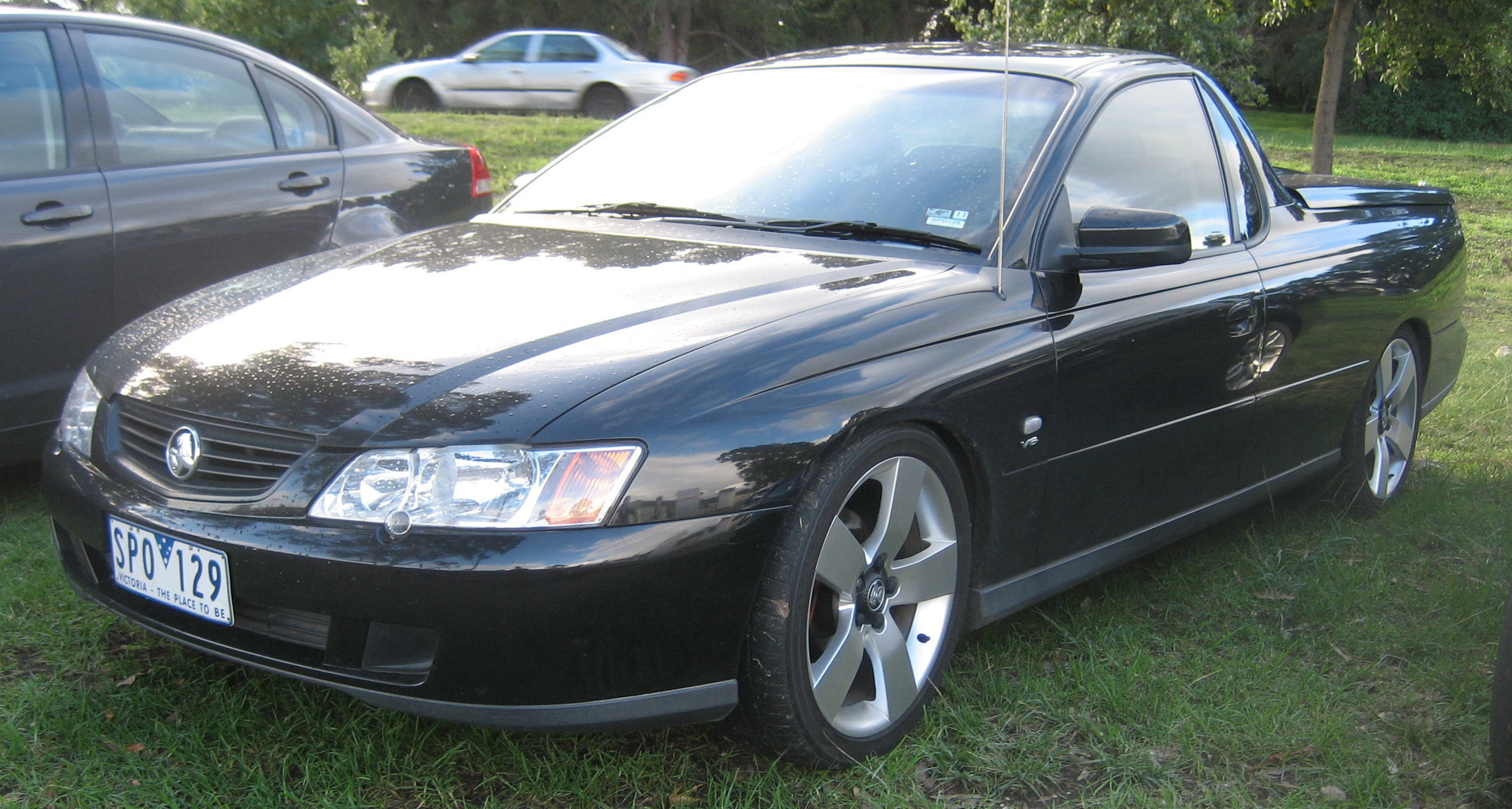
Holden Ute SS (VY II)

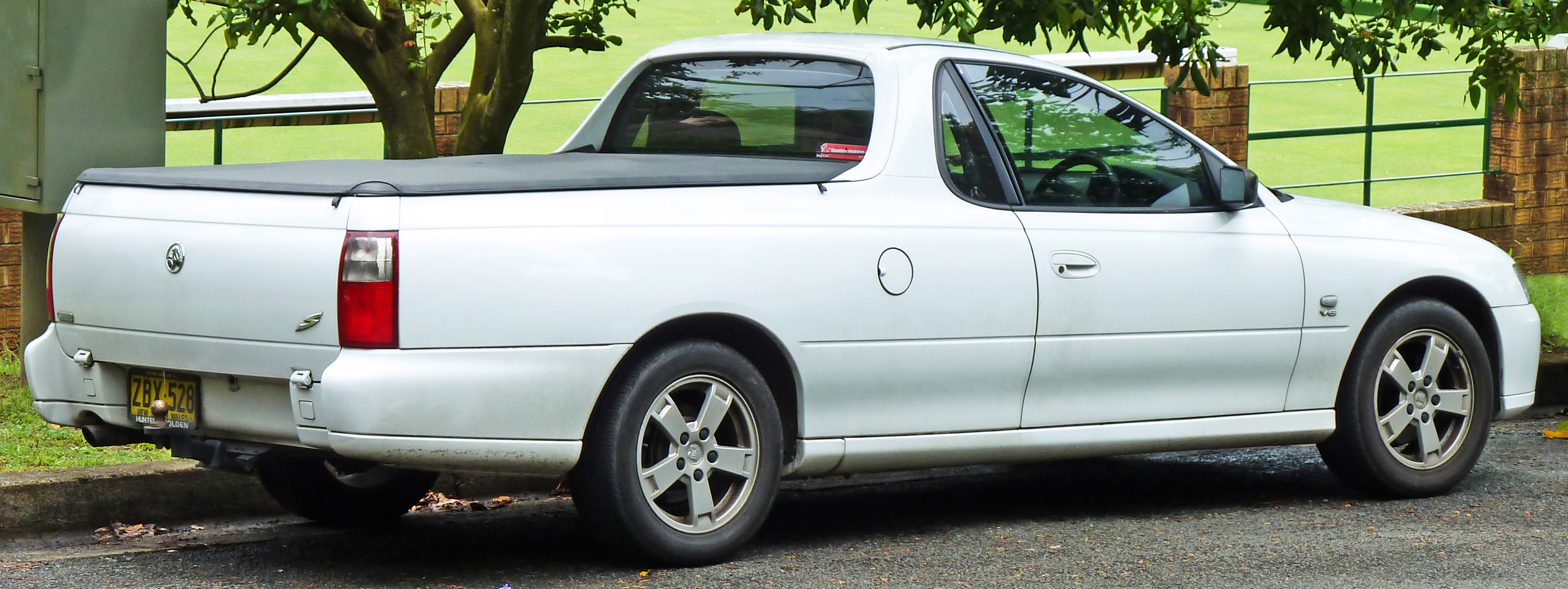
Holden Ute S (VY)

The Ute range received its first major facelift in 2002 to the form of the VY range. VY Ute's received the same upgrades as the sedan/wagon range, which involved a new, sharper-designed nose, and more European-styled interior. The same three specification models were carried over for the VY, and picked up the same upgraded equipment lists as the VY sedans. The VY range marked major change for Holden's Ute range, with the 2003 addition of two new models: the return of the One Tonner cab-chassis utility after an 18-year hiatus; and the introduction of Holden's first-ever 4-door utility, arriving in the form of the Crewman.

Both the Crewman and One Tonner models added instant sales to the Holden range, sparking rapid expansion of the Holden Ute range, its first major growth spurt since its 1990 re-introduction. Once again the same three specifications were carried over for the VY, with the Ute range available in base Ute, S & SS forms. The same did not apply for the One-Tonner cab-chassis range though – it was available in just two model forms, base and S.

- Base: Based on Commodore Executive specification. Available with 3.8-litre 152 kW (204 hp) Ecotec V6 – 4sp auto, 5sp manual or the optional 5.7-litre 225 kW (302 hp) Generation 3 V8 - 6sp manual or 4sp automatic.
- S : Based on Commodore S specification. Available with 3.8-litre 152 kW (204 hp) Ecotec V6 – 4sp auto, 5sp manual or the optional 5.7-litre 225 kW (302 hp) Generation 3 V8 - 6sp manual or 4sp automatic.
- SS: Based on Commodore SS specification. 5.7-litre 235 kW (315 hp) Generation 3 V8 – 4sp auto, 6sp manual

Crewman models were on the other hand available with the same three specifications as the Ute range, and were launched conjointly with the rest of Holden's VY Series 2 range, the major update this time being the addition of 10 kW (13 hp) to the Gen.3 V8. By December 2003 the Crewman range had expanded to include Holden's very first AWD utility in the form of the Crewman Cross 8. The Cross 8 received bolstered wheelarches, raised ride height as well as additional equipment, with the sole drivetrain being the recently upgraded Gen.3 V8 connected to a 4-speed automatic. V6-powered versions of the One Tonner & Crewman were only available with automatic transmission. The VY's were superseded by the arrival of the VZ range in August 2004

=== VZ ===
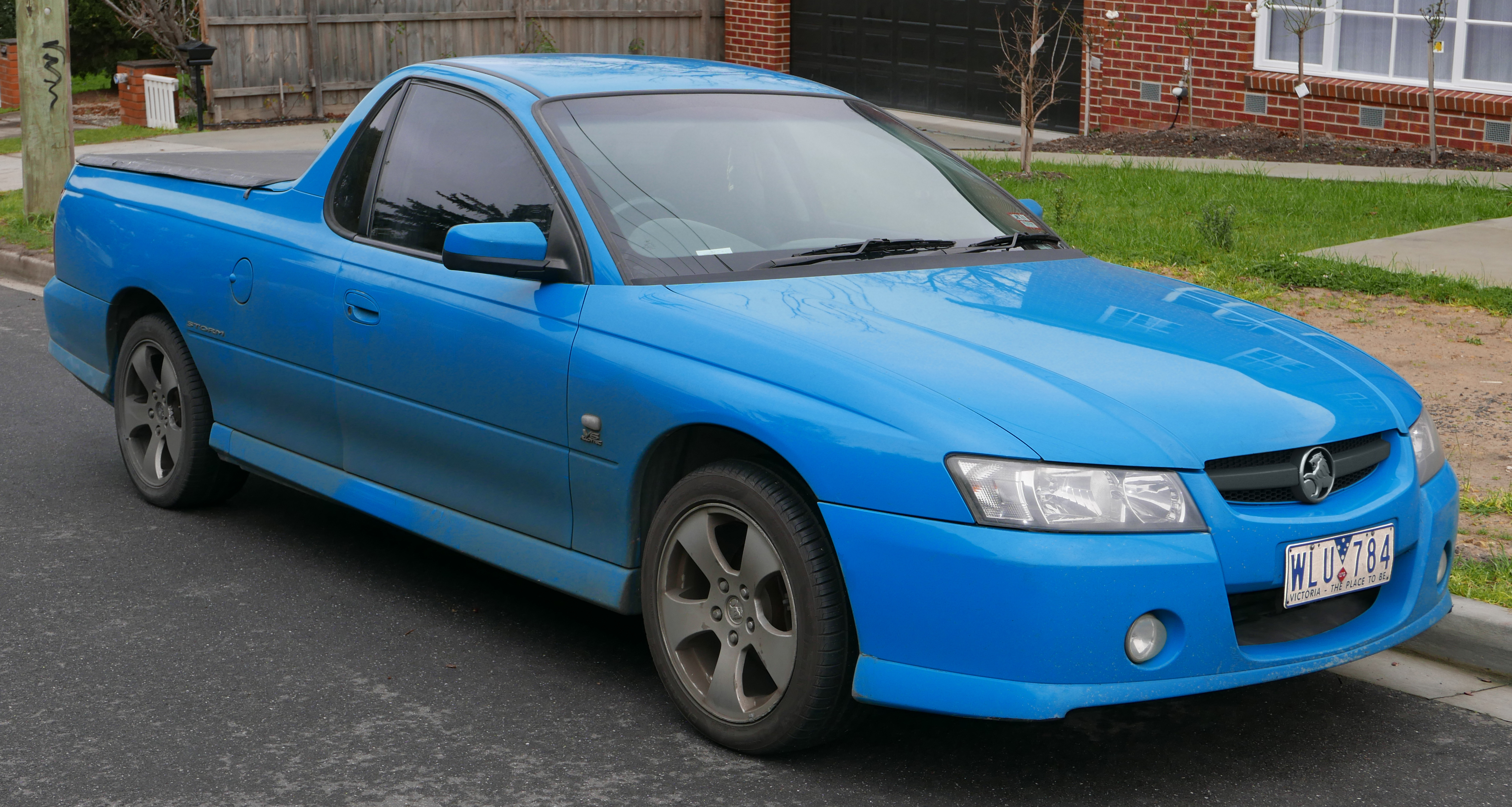

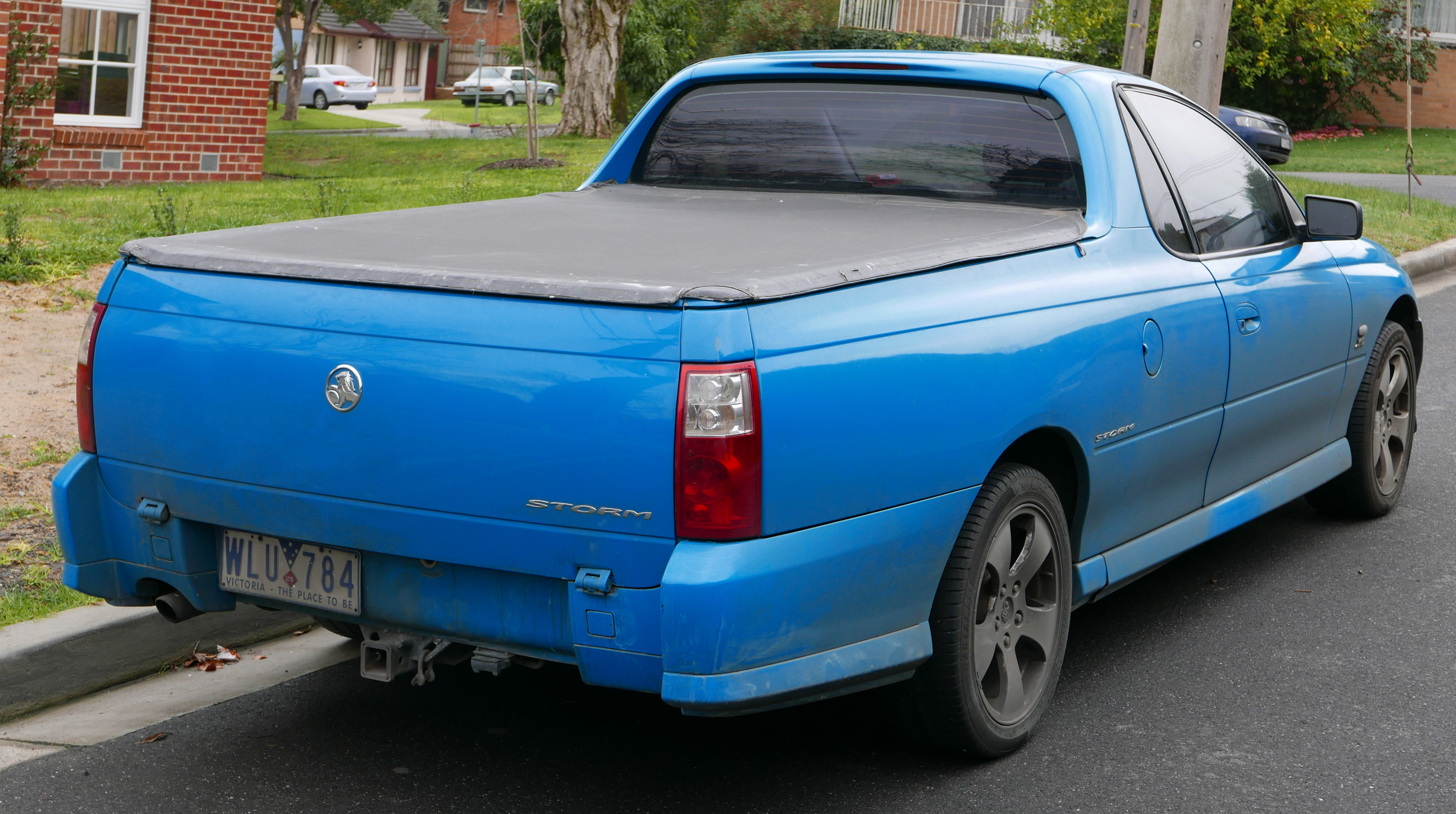
Holden Ute Storm S (VZ)

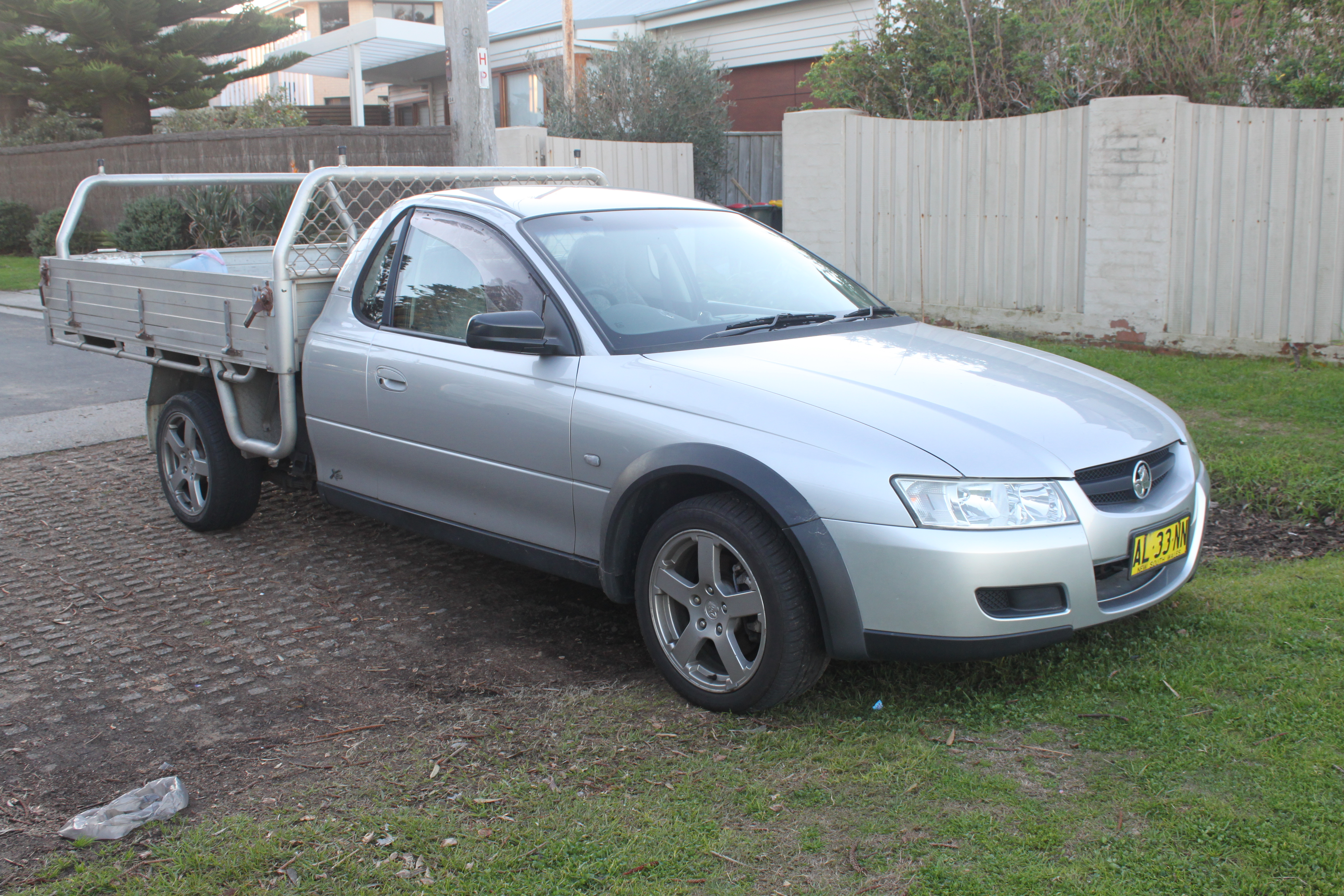
Holden One Tonner Cross 6 (VY II)

The final series of Holden's VT-generation was the VZ range, launched in August 2004. Holden's main upgrade for the VZ's was the introduction of an all-new Alloytec V6, replacing Holden's previous Ecotec V6's which had been in use since the 1995 launch of the VS Commodore. Whilst the sedan VZ range received both versions of the Alloytec V6, the ute range received just the lower-capacity Alloytec 175 - it was the standard engine across the entire ute range with a six-speed manual - an upgraded 4-speed automatic was available as an option. Once again the One Tonner & Crewman ranges shared the same specification models, as shown below:

- Base: Based on Commodore Executive specification. Available with 3.6-litre 175 kW (235 hp) Alloytec V6 - 6sp manual or 4sp autotomatic or the optional 5.7-litre 225 kW (302 hp) Generation 3 V8 - 6sp manual or 4sp autotomatic.
- S: Based on Commodore SV6 specification. Available with 3.6-litre 175 kW (235 hp) Alloytec V6 - 6sp manual or 4sp autotomatic or the optional 5.7-litre 235 kW (315 hp) Generation 3 V8 - 6sp manual or 4sp autotomatic.

This model was rebranded as SV6 in August 2006, and the 5-speed auto from the sedan became available for the first time as well as a power increase to 190 kW (255 hp).

- SS: Based on Commodore SS specification (minus side-impact airbags on cab-chassis). Available with a 5.7-litre 245 kW (329 hp) Generation 3 V8, or the new 260 kW (349 hp) 6.0-litre Generation 4 V8 'L98' - 6sp manual or 4sp autotomatic.

Crewman's were once again available in Cross 8 form, whilst the VZ range added the Crewman Cross 6, essentially a V6 version of the Cross 8.

To make room in the factory for the upcoming VE Commodore, production of the One Tonner ceased in December 2005.

The Ute range continued without any updates for the next 18 months, until the January 2006 addition of Holden's new L76 V8's. Holden's new V8 range was introduced after its previous Generation 3 V8 failed to meet new Euro III emission standards introduced in Australia on January 1, 2006. The new Generation 4 V8's contained an additional 10 kW (13 hp) compared to their predecessors (the ute's had previously received an addition 15 kW (20 hp) of power, inline with the VZ Sedan range), but were missing two key features compared to their American counterparts: both Displacement on Demand and variable valve timing had been removed. The Alloytec 175 also lost 3 kW (4 hp) of power due tweaks made to meet Euro III standards.' The VZ Utes remained on sale well after the introduction of Holden's next-generation VE sedans, as did the VZ Wagons. By December of the same year, the Crewman and all AWD variants of the ute were gone from showrooms after Holden ceased production, whilst the curtain was brought down on the One-Tonner range once again after poor sales results. Holden's VZ Utes were superseded by the 8th-generation VE Ute range in September 2007.

== Second generation (2007–2017) ==
=== VE ===
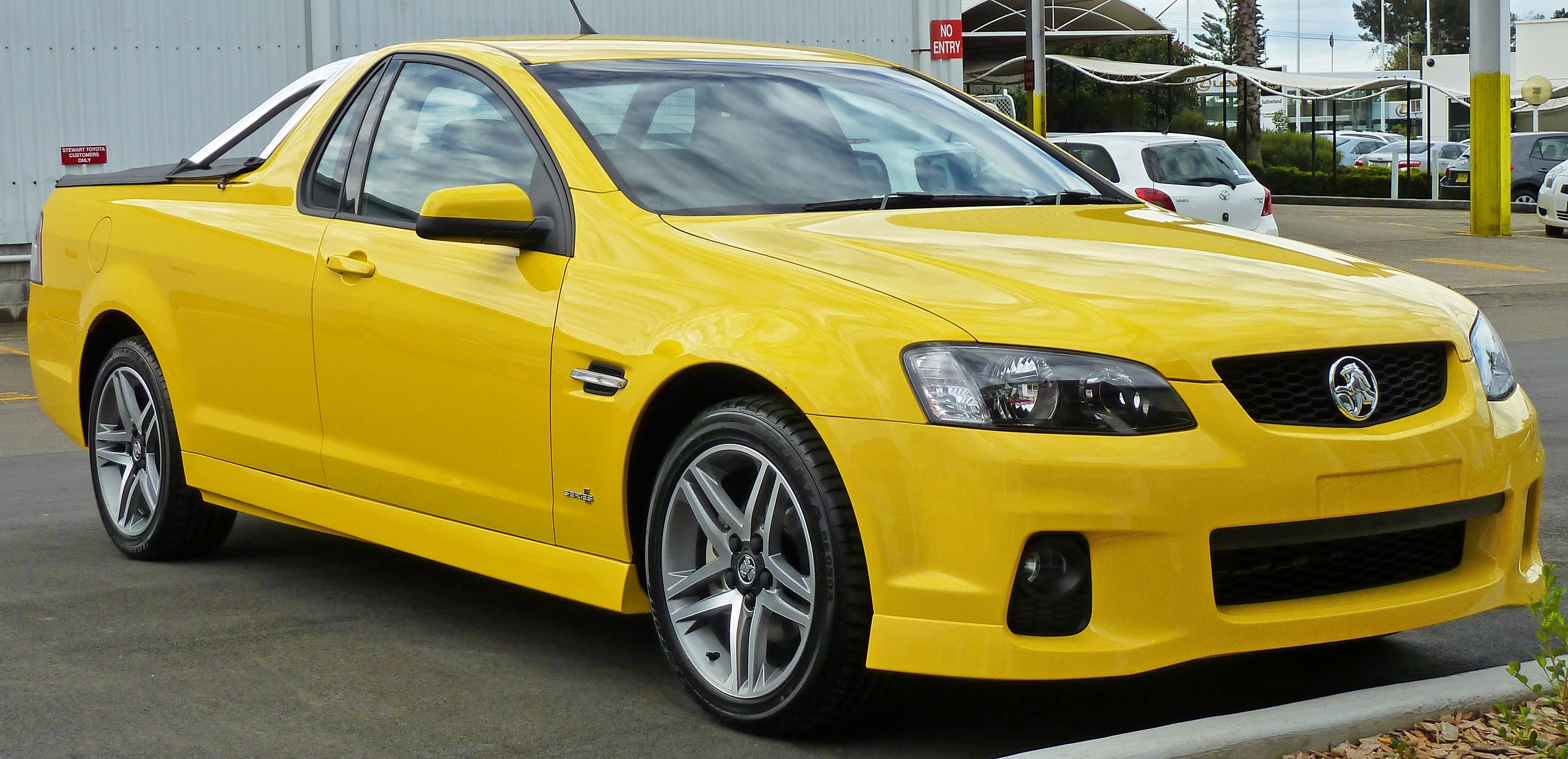

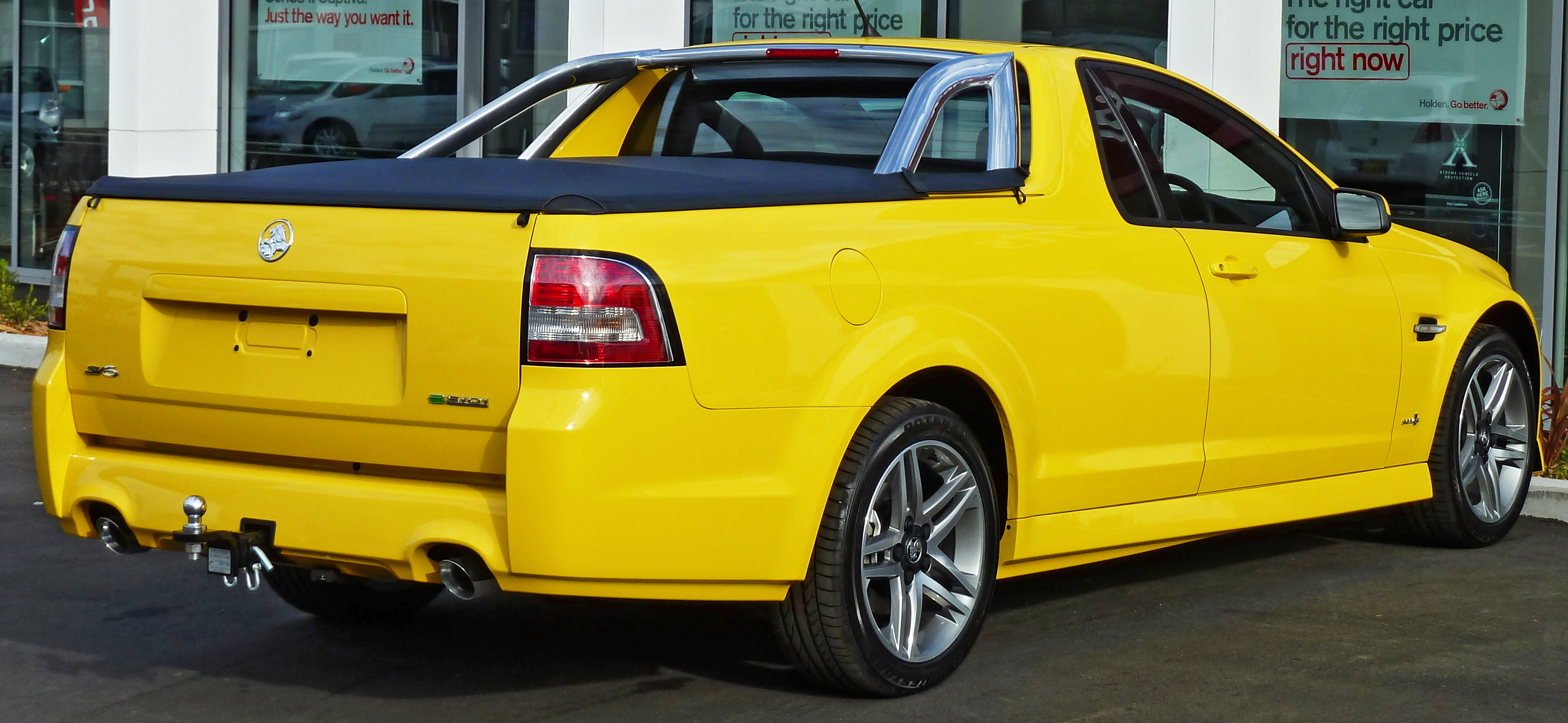
Holden Ute SV6 (VE II)

2007 saw the launch of Holden's eagerly anticipated VE Ute range, unveiled to the media in August, with showroom sales began later in the month. The new generation designated VE, based on the VE Commodore tackles an upward consumer tendency towards using utes as lifestyle vehicles. This further shifts the ute away from the traditional workhorse market.

- Omega: The base model, having similar standard features to the Omega sedan but can carry more than the SS-V, SS and SV6. It has the standard 3.6-litre V6 180 kW (241 hp) and 330 N⋅m (243 lb⋅ft). The manual version of the Omega came with the 3.6-litre High-Output V6 with 195 kW (261 hp) and 340 N⋅m (251 lb⋅ft) but only until the mid-2009 MY10 update.
- SV6: A sportier version of the V6 ute, the SV6 replaced the S-pack from previous models. This Ute has the 3.6-litre High-Output V6 with 195 kW (261 hp) and 340 N⋅m (251 lb⋅ft). Which has been recently updated to 210 kW (282 hp) and 350 N⋅m (258 lb⋅ft) engine.
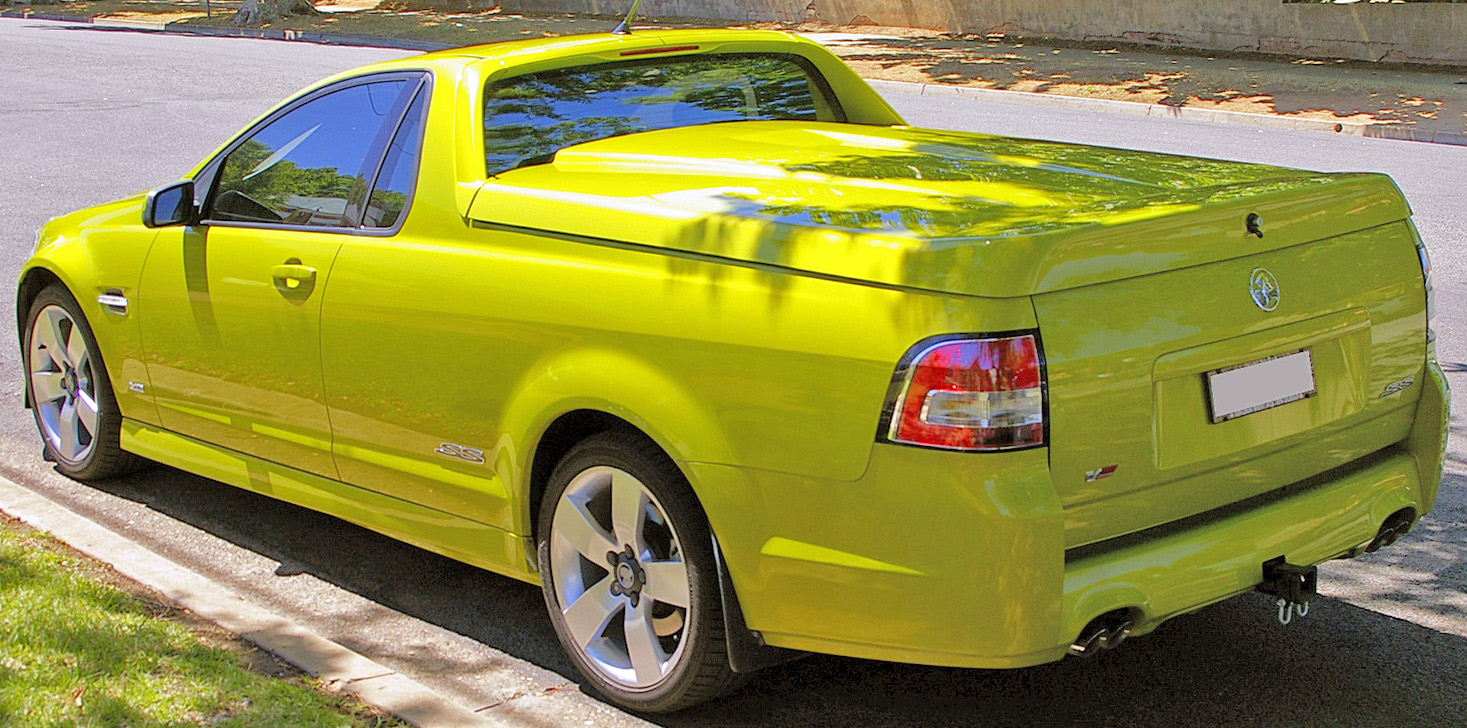
  2007–2008 Holden VE Ute SS V.
- SS: The SS ute is the V8 version of the ute, it has the same 6-litre V8 as the sedan with 270 kW (362 hp) and 530 N⋅m (391 lb⋅ft).
- SS-V: A higher spec edition of the SS and based on the SS-V Sedan, it has a 6-litre V8 with 270 kW (362 hp) and 530 N⋅m (391 lb⋅ft).
- SS-V Redline (Series II):A performance version of the SS-V offering Brembo brakes, 19-inch Alloy wheels, FE3 Super Sports Performance Suspension and a mandatory tyre inflater kit.

Unlike the previous VU–VZ generation, no double-cab, cab-chassis or AWD variants are offered.

==== Safety ====
ANCAP test results Holden Commodore Ute Omega variants (2008)
Test	Score
Overall	4 /5 stars
Frontal offset	11.57/16
Side impact	14.84/16
Pole	Not Assessed
Seat belt reminders	1/3
Whiplash protection	Not Assessed
Pedestrian protection	Poor
Electronic stability control	Standard

ANCAP test results Holden Commodore Ute Omega variants (2008)
Test	Score
Overall	4 /5 stars
Frontal offset	13.57/16
Side impact	14.84/16
Pole	Not Assessed
Seat belt reminders	2/3
Whiplash protection	Not Assessed
Pedestrian protection	Poor
Electronic stability control	Standard

ANCAP test results Holden Commodore Ute all variants (2010)
Test	Score
Overall	5 /5 stars
Frontal offset	13.57/16
Side impact	15.59/16
Pole	2/2
Seat belt reminders	2/3
Whiplash protection	Not Assessed
Pedestrian protection	Poor
Electronic stability control	Standard

=== VF ===
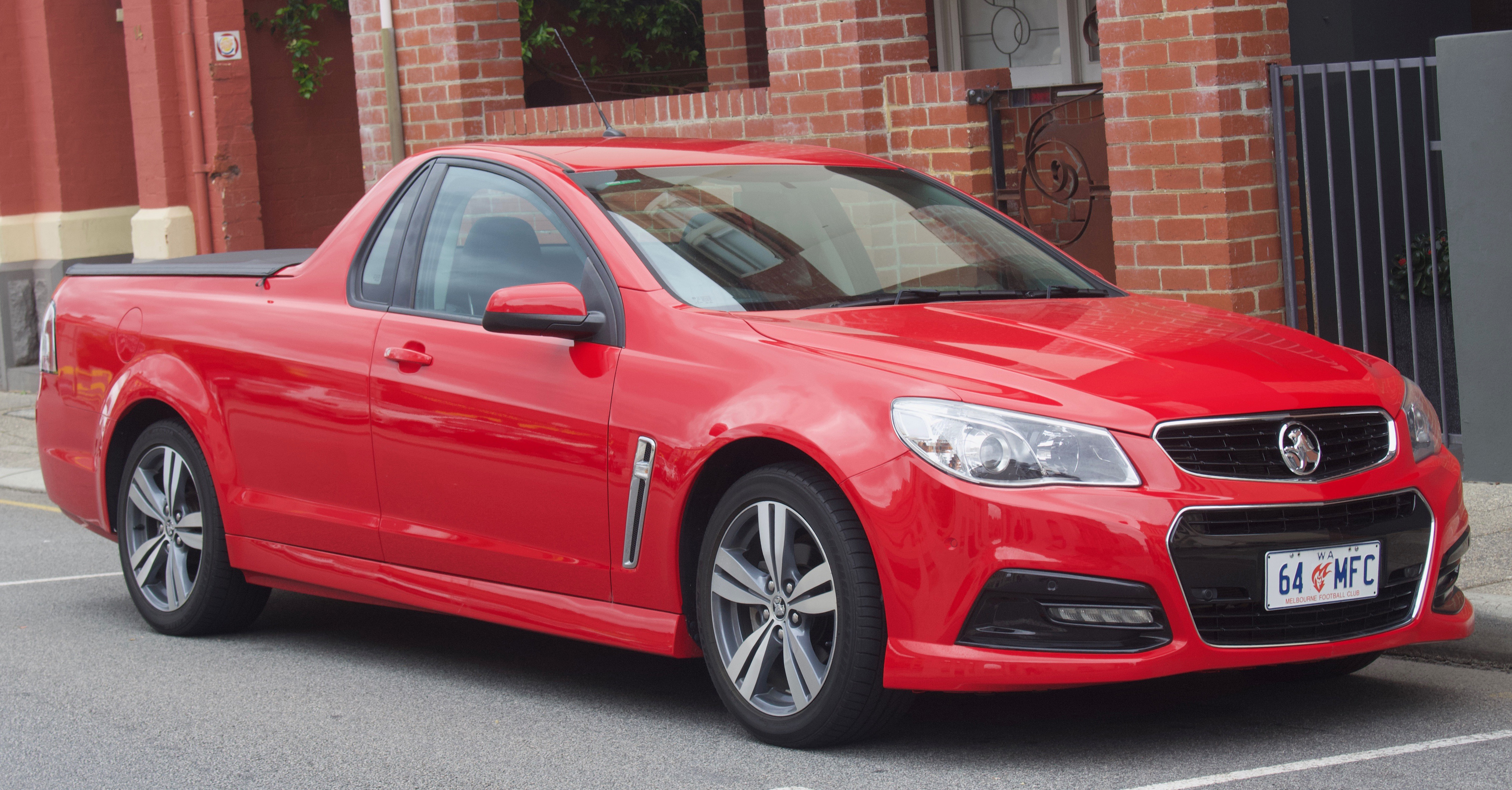

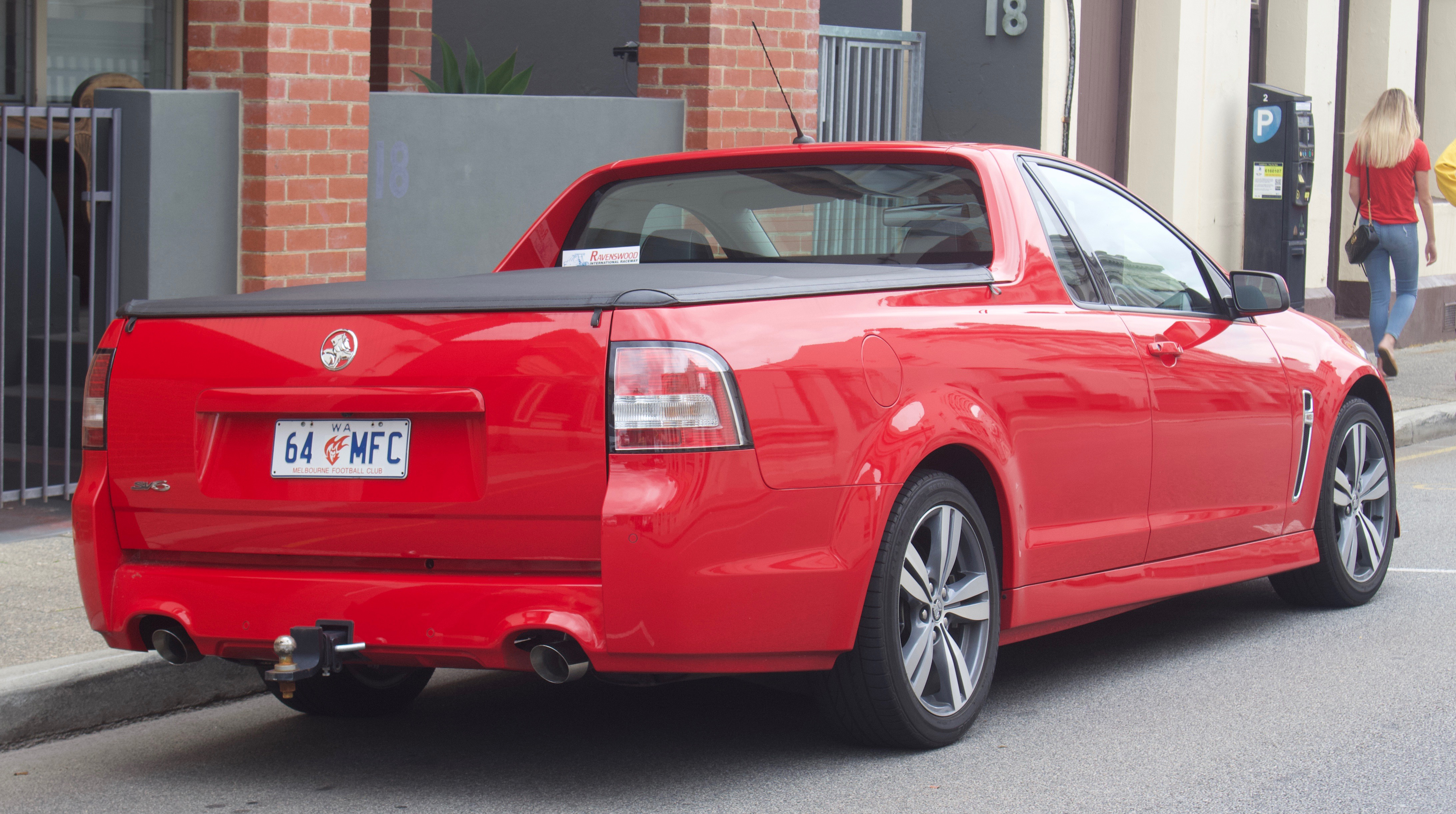
Holden Ute SV6 (VF)

Like other models in the VF range, VF Ute brought updated features and styling. Much of the bodywork from the C-pillar to the rear of VF Ute remained unchanged from VE Ute. Production of VF Ute, along with other locally produced models, ended in 2017 with the closure of Holden's manufacturing operations in Australia. Holden continued to offer the imported Colorado until 2020 when the Holden brand was retired.

==== Safety ====
ANCAP test results Holden Commodore Ute (2013)
Test	Score
Overall	5 /5 stars
Frontal offset	14.06/16
Side impact	16/16
Pole	2/2
Seat belt reminders	2/3
Whiplash protection	Good
Pedestrian protection	Marginal
Electronic stability control	Standard

== Holden Crewman ==
The Holden Crewman is a utility vehicle built by Holden. The Crewman is a 4-door version of the Holden Ute. Holden Launched the VY Crewman in September 2003. The VZ Crewman was introduced in conjunction with the VZ Commodore and Ute in August 2004.

The Crewman differs from standard Holden Utes in that it features a second row of seating; a longer wheelbase - 3,206 mm (126.2 in) compared to the 2,939 mm (115.7 in) of the Ute; and a shorter tray - 1,463 mm (57.6 in) compared to the 2,193 mm (86.3 in) of the Ute

In December 2003, Holden released an all-wheel drive variant of the Crewman known as the Crewman Cross 8. Powered by a 225 kilowatt V8 engine, the Cross 8 featured a modified appearance, more suited to an off-road vehicle. The HSV Avalanche XUV by Holden Special Vehicles is a modified Crewman Cross 8.

=== VY ===
The Crewman brought a longer wheelbase – 3,206 mm (126.2 in) compared to the 2,939 mm (115.7 in) of the Ute; and a shorter tray – 1,463 mm (57.6 in) compared to the 2,193 mm (86.3 in) of the Ute In December 2003, Holden released an all-wheel drive variant of the Crewman known as the Crewman Cross 8.

The Crewman launched conjointly with the rest of Holden's VY Series 2 range, the major update being the addition of 10 kW (13 hp) to the Gen.3 V8. By December 2003 the Crewman range had expanded to include Holden's very first AWD utility in the form of the Crewman Cross 8. The Cross 8 received bolstered wheelarches, raised ride height as well as additional equipment, with the sole drivetrain being the recently upgraded Gen.3 V8 connected to a 4-speed automatic. V6-powered versions of the One Tonner & Crewman were only available with automatic transmission. The VY's were superseded by the arrival of the VZ range in August 2004.

=== VZ ===
The 3.6 V6 Alloytec 175 was the standard base engine with a six-speed manual, a 4-speed automatic was also available as an option. Crewman vehicles were factory speed limited to 160 km/h due to the long length of driveshaft. The Crewman also suffered a larger turning circle and heavier fuel consumption than the ute, due to the longer, heavier wheelbase chassis. The One Tonner and Crewman ranges shared the same base specification models, as shown below:

- Base model Crewman/Ute adopting the specifications of the Commodore Executive. Available with 3.6-litre 175 kW (235 hp) Alloytec V6 – six-speed manual or four-speed automatic. 175 kW at engine flywheel, and typically 119–122 kW at the rear wheels due to drivetrain losses.
- S Crewman/Ute- based on Commodore SV6 specification. Available with 3.6-litre 175 kW (235 hp) Alloytec V6 – six-speed manual or four-speed automatic

The S specification was rebranded as SV6 in August 2006, and the five-speed auto from the sedan became available, with no other changes.

The V8 SS received a power increase to 235 kW (315 hp).

Based on Commodore SS specification (minus side-impact airbags on cab-chassis). Available with a 5.7-litre 235 kW (315 hp) Gen III V8, or the new 260 kW (349 hp) 6.0-litre L98 – six-speed manual or four-speed auto.

The Crewman was also available in a higher spec Cross 8 form, whilst the VZ Crewman Cross 6 was essentially a lower powered, base model V6 version of the Cross 8.

Citing poor Crewman sales and uptake by consumers, Holden chose not to manufacture a Crewman model for the VE series.

== Holden One Tonner ==
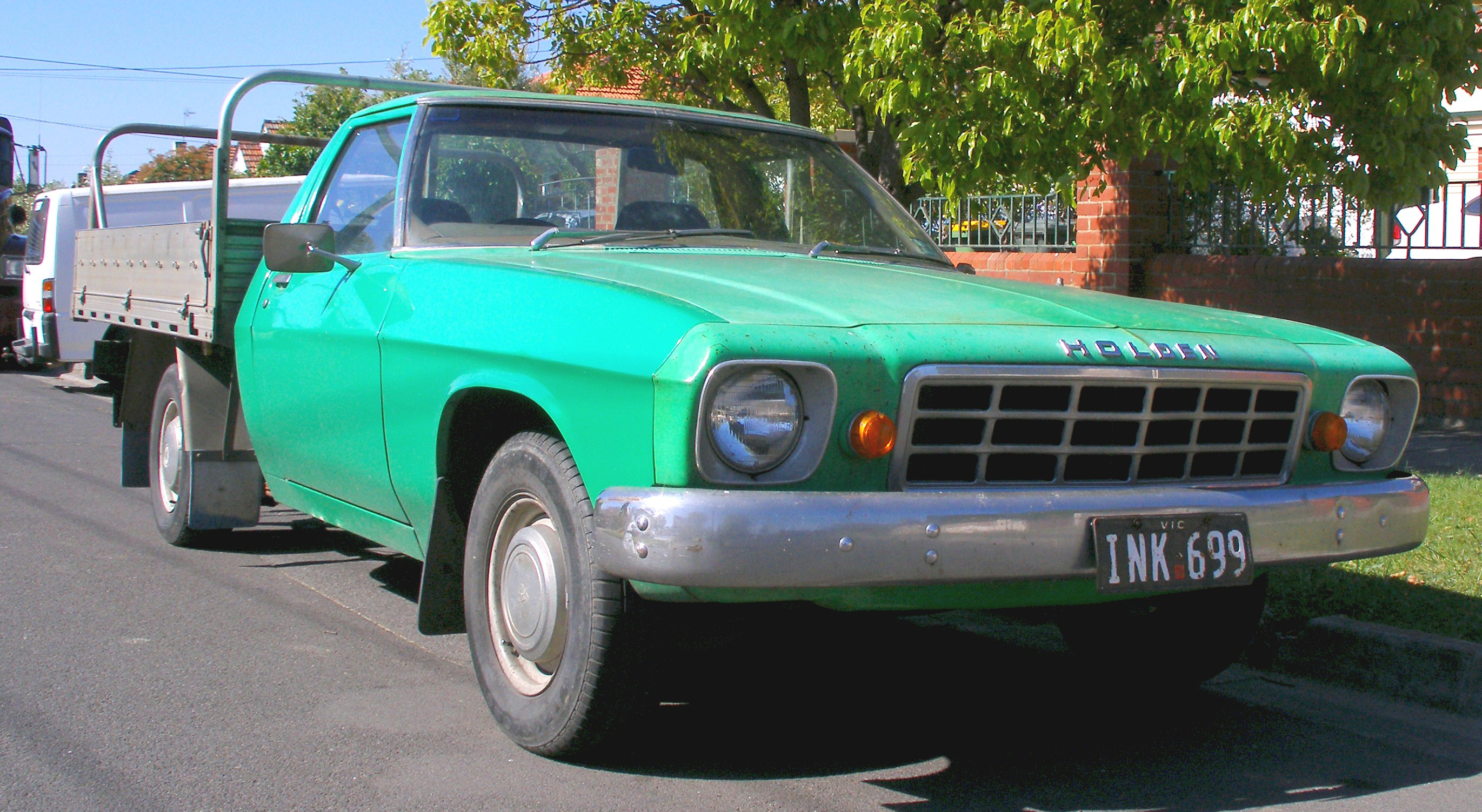
Holden One Tonner (HJ)

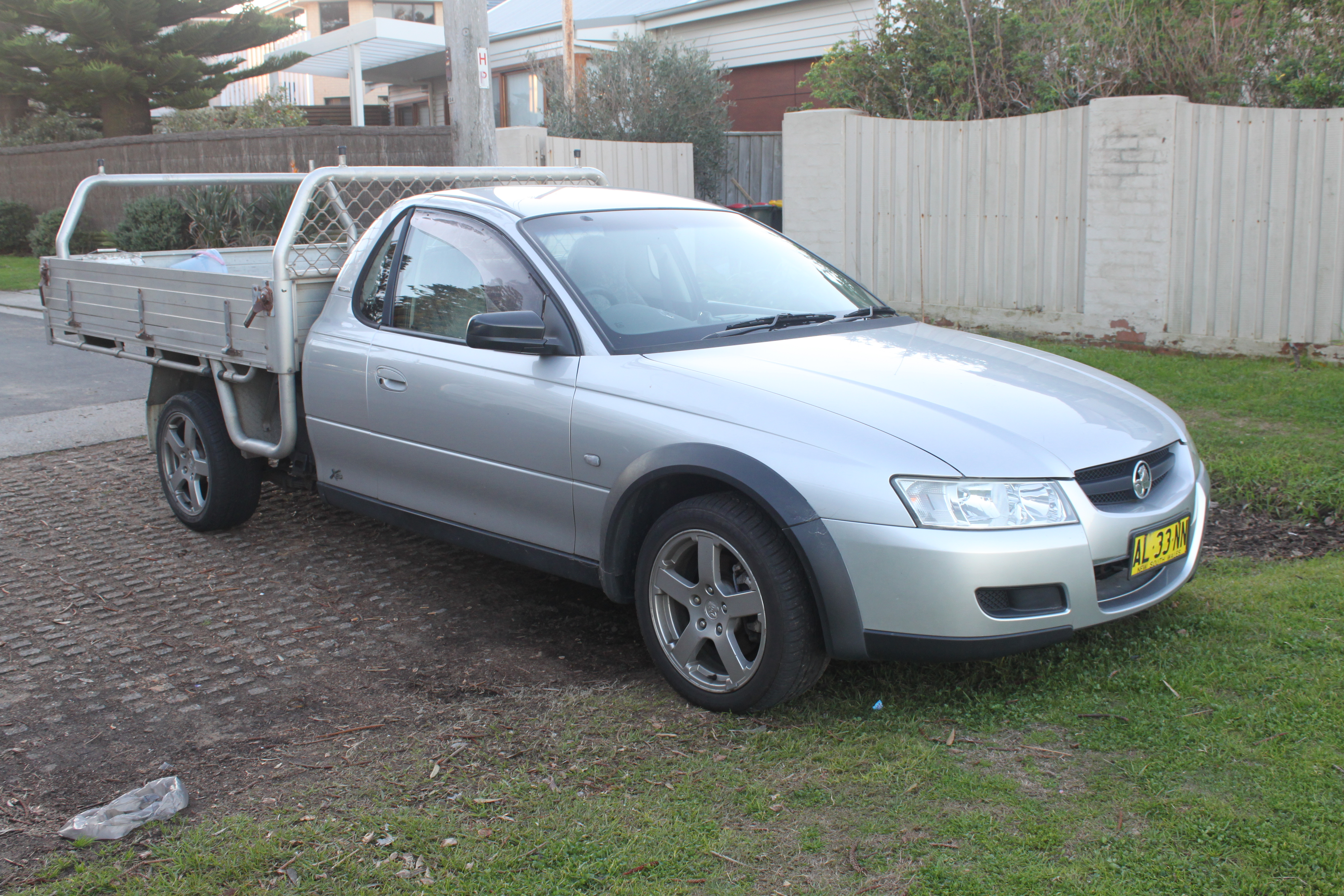
Holden One Tonner Cross 6 (VZ)

The Holden One Tonner is a cab chassis utility vehicle that was produced by Holden between 1971 and 1985, from the Holden HQ to WB, and again between 2003 and 2005, with the VY and VZ Commodore. It was sold in South Africa as the Chevrolet El Toro between 1974 and 1978.

=== HQ ===
The HQ One Tonner was produced from 1971 to 1974. It was offered with the 2.8L 173 and 3.3L 202 I6s, and the 4.1L 253 and 5.0L 308 Holden V8 engines.

=== HJ ===
The HJ series was produced from 1974 to 1976. It was offered with the 2.8-litre and 3.3-litre I6s, and the 4.2-litre and 5.0-litre V8s. Unlike the other HJ models, which were easily identified from the HQ by having a squared-off frontal treatment with wraparound indicator lights. The One Tonner in base form still used its own unique front treatment introduced with the previous HQ range, and would continue with the model until 1980 with the WB series.

=== HX ===
The HX series was produced from 1976 to 1977. The HX models featured only minor updates to the exterior, notably the grille and badgework. A 3.3-litre 202 I6 engine was available, as were 4.2-litre 253 and 5.0-litre 308 V8s. All were modified low-emission units to comply with the new ADR27A regulations, and were notably less powerful than their predecessors. The 2.8-litre inline six available in the HJ series was no longer offered.

=== HZ ===
The HZ series was produced from 1977 to 1980. Offering the 3.3-litre 202 I6, 4.2-itre 253, 5.0-litre 308. Alongside the rest of the HZ range the One Tonner saw the introduction of "Radial Tuned Suspension" (RTS) across all models. RTS made significant changes to the suspension of the car, greatly improving the handling.

=== WB ===
The WB series was produced from 1980 to 1985. It was offered with the 3.3 Litre Straight six Blue engine as standard, the 4.2-litre 253 V8 was offered as an option. The 308 V8 option was not carried over from the HZ range, but was available by special request.

=== VY ===
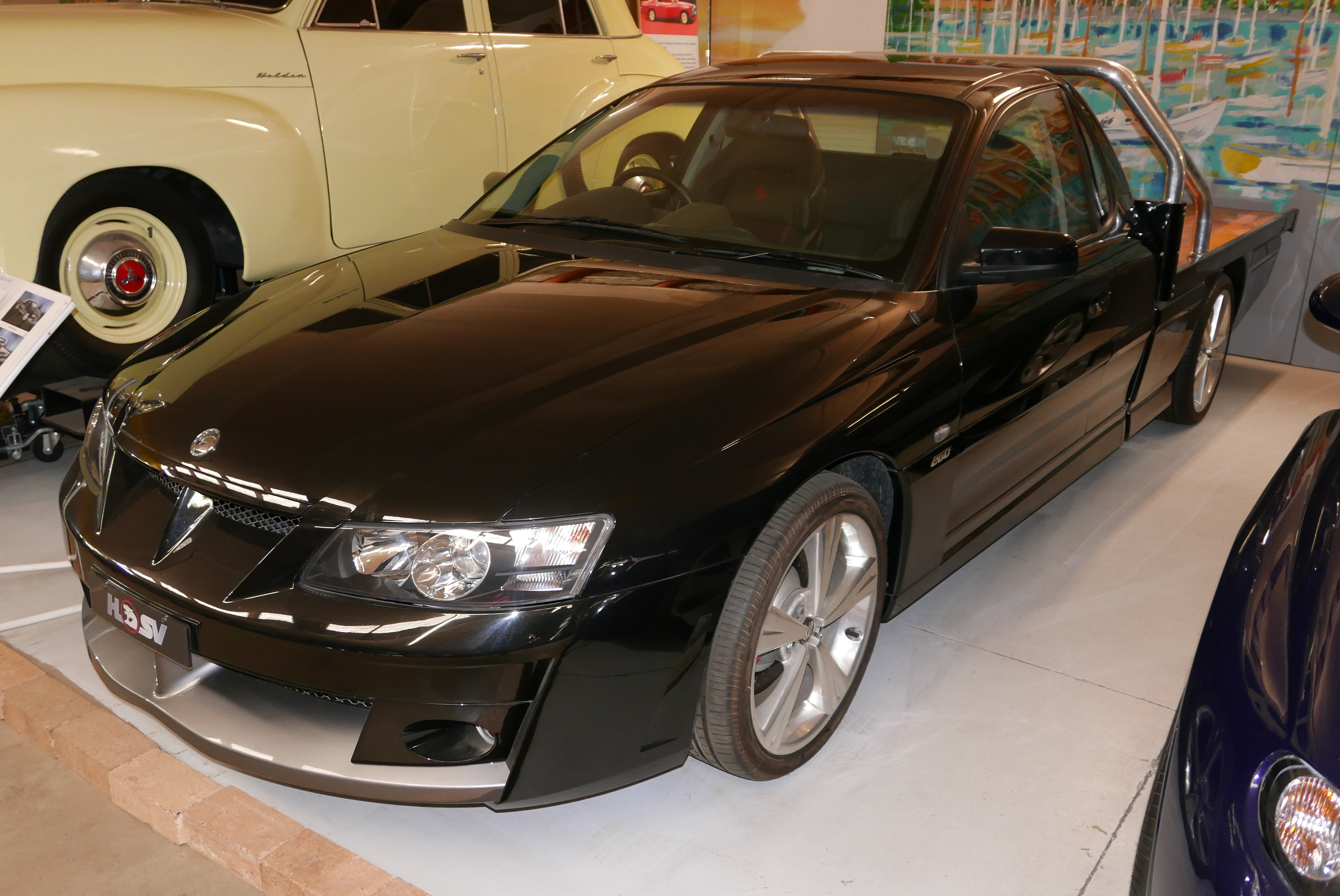
HSV Maloo (Y Series) cab chassis, concept

The VY series saw the return of the One Tonner cab-chassis utility after an 18-year hiatus. Unlike the regular VY utes the One Tonner was only offered in two trims:

- Base: Based on Commodore Executive specification. Available with 3.8-litre 152 kW (204 hp) Ecotec V6 – 4sp auto
- S : Based on Commodore S specification. Available with 3.8-litre 152 kW (204 hp) Ecotec V6 – 4sp auto

There was a VY-based cab chassis HSV Maloo concept, it was scheduled to launch in 2003 if released.

=== VZ ===
The VZ series were available with the following specifications:

- Base :Based on Commodore Executive specification. Available with 3.6-litre 175 kW (235 hp) Alloytec V6 - 6sp manual or 4sp auto or 5.7-litre 235 kW (315 hp) Generation 3 V8 - 6sp manual or 4sp auto
- S: Based on Commodore SV6 specification minus fog-lights. Available with 3.6-litre 175 kW (235 hp) Alloytec V6 - 6sp manual or 4sp auto or 5.7-litre 235 kW (315 hp) Generation 3 V8 - 6sp manual or 4sp auto
- Cross 6: AWD One-Tonner. Available with 3.6-litre 175 kW (235 hp) Alloytec V6 - 4sp automatic only
- SVZ: Based on the SV6 plus leather seats, paddle shifts on the steering wheel, Monaro CV8 rims. Available with 3.6-litre 195 kW (261 hp) Alloytec V6 - 5-speed automatic or 6-speed manual

To make room in the factory for the upcoming VE Commodore, production of the One Tonner ceased in December 2005.

== Holden Special Vehicles ==
Starting in 1990, Holden's performance outfit, Holden Special Vehicles (HSV), built a performance version of the ute named the Maloo.

== Sales ==
Holden Ute sales in Australia
2000s	Variant	2000	2001	2002	2003	2004	2005	2006	2007	2008	2009
2000s	Ute (4x2)	6,361 (Note: Numbers combine VS Ute and VU Utility, with the Holden Ute (VU) starting production in December 2000)	11,173	13,791	17,211	20,813	18,877	13,377	11,511	13,449	12,104
2000s	Crewman (4x4)					1,559	1,325	697	9	0	2
2010s		2010	2011	2012	2013	2014	2015	2016	2017	2018	2019
2010s		11,405	9,489	7,925	5,941	5,596	4,936	4,802	4,241	342	3

== See also ==
- Holden Commodore
- Ford Falcon Ute
