= Australian International Motor Show =

Australian auto show

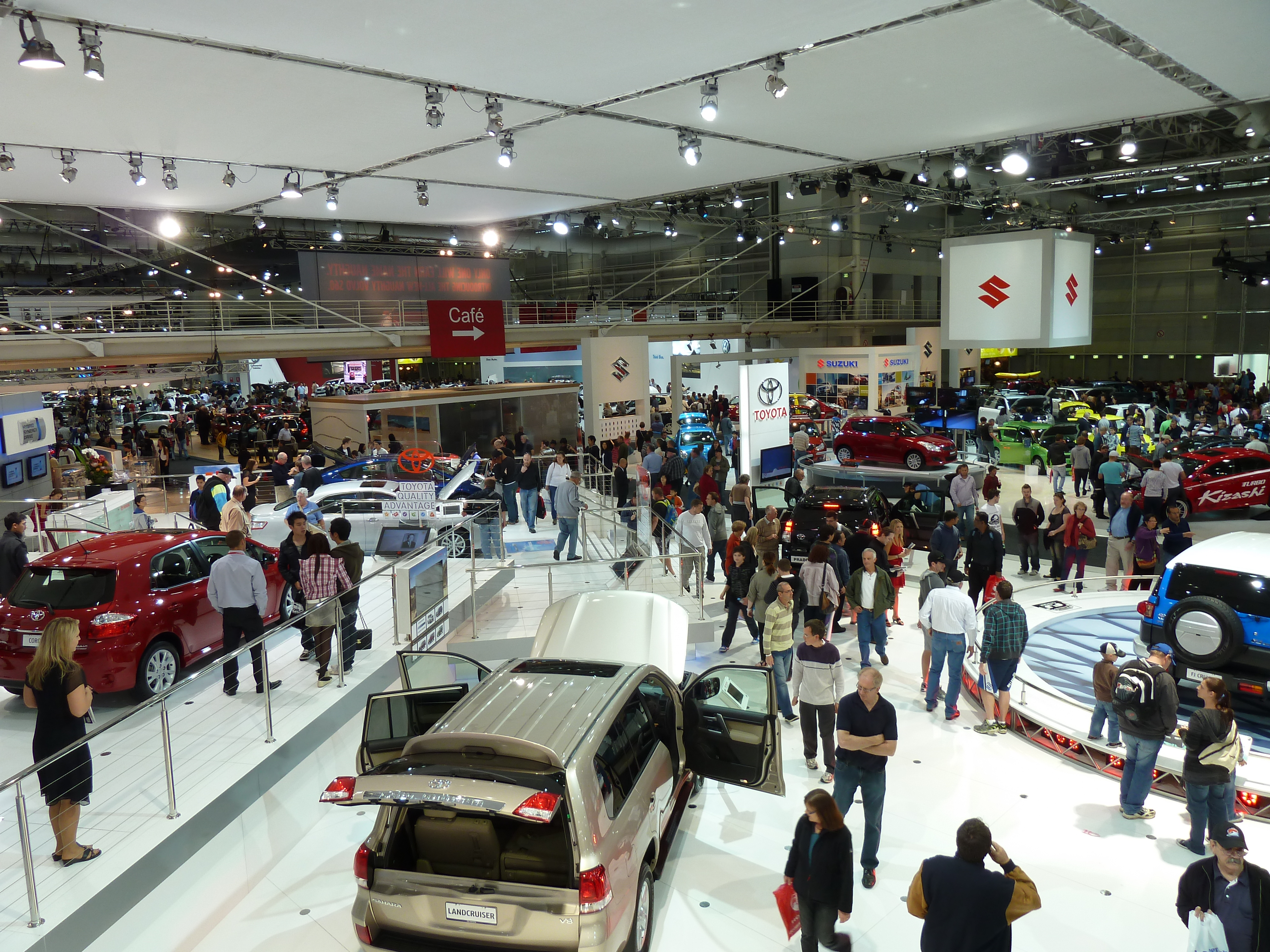
- 2010 Australian International Motor Show
- Status: Active
- Genre: Auto show
- Begins: 30 April 1925
- Ends: 2009
- Frequency: Annual (1925–2009; 2025–)
- Country: Australia
- Years active: 101
- Inaugurated: 30 April 1925
- Most recent: 10 April 2026 – 12 April 2026
- Website: melbournemotorshow.au

The Australian International Motor Show (AIMS) was an annual auto show held in Australia, alternating between the cities of Sydney and Melbourne. Prior to the Sydney event in 2010, both cities previously hosted separate annual exhibitions. Melbourne's version was known as the Melbourne International Motor Show, with Sydney hosting the Australian International Motor Show (known as the Sydney Motor Show prior to 2004).

== History ==
The Melbourne International Motor Show was held from 1925 through to 2009; it was the longest running auto show in Australia. The Sydney show was originally titled Sydney Motor Show but the 2004 show signalled the adoption of the Australian International Motor Show (AIMS) title.

AIMS continued to be held at Sydney annually until 2008, when the 2008 financial crisis and poor attendances at the 2008 show resulted in the cancellation of the 2009 show. Prior to the staging of the 2008 show in Sydney, the organisers of AIMS, the Federal Chamber of Automotive Industries (FCAI), and the Victorian Automobile Chamber of Commerce (VACC), organiser of the Melbourne International Motor Show had commenced discussions to consider options for the future staging and organisation of motor shows in Sydney and Melbourne. On 3 February 2009 it was announced that these discussions had culminated in the formation of a joint venture between FCAI and VACC to organise an automotive exhibition, which would alternate between Melbourne and Sydney biennially, commencing with Sydney in 2010. Under the joint venture, both the Sydney and Melbourne shows now use the existing Sydney title, "Australian International Motor Show" (AIMS).

=== Sydney ===
The Sydney Motor Show was held at the Sydney Showground in Moore Park until 1987. From 1988, the show was relocated to Darling Harbour at the Sydney Convention and Exhibition Centre. The first joint-venture AIMS motor was held in Sydney from 15–24 October 2010.

In 2012 the show was held from 19–28 October 2012 at the Sydney Convention and Exhibition Centre and included over 400 motor vehicles.

=== Melbourne ===
The first Melbourne Motor Show was started on 30 April 1925. Until 1996 it was held at the Royal Exhibition Building then moved to the new Melbourne Convention & Exhibition Centre complex, in Southbank. The 2009 show was the last to operate under the "Melbourne International Motor Show" title. Until 2009, the show was usually held in March but commencing in 2011 is held in July.

The Australian International Motor Show (AIMS) Joint Venture announced on 25 March that the 2013 Australian International Motor Show scheduled for Melbourne in June would not proceed.

The Melbourne Motor Show returned on 5-6 April 2025, the first traditional motor show since the 2012 Sydney event. and was held again on 10-12 April 2026.

== Dissolution ==
In a statement released on 25 February 2014, VACC and FCAI announced the dissolution of the Australian International Motor Show joint venture.

On 20 May 2014, VACC announced a joint venture with the Royal Automobile Club of Victoria (RACV) to create the Australian Motoring Festival to be held at Royal Melbourne Showgrounds on 26–29 March 2015.

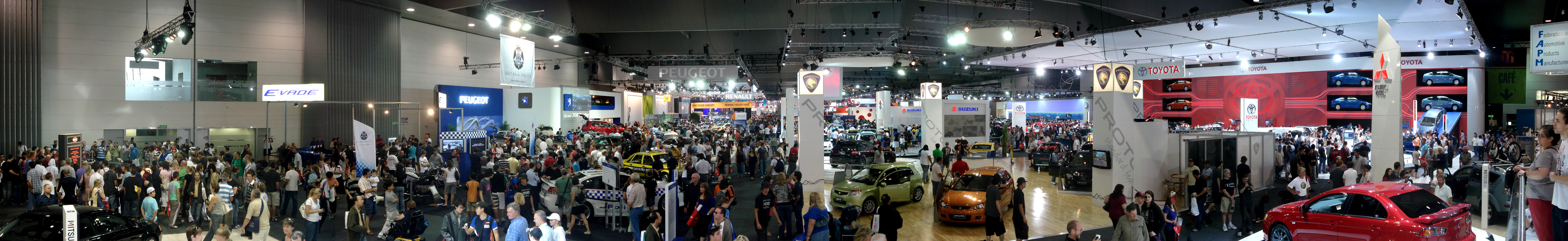
2008 Melbourne International Motor Show
