= Lakeside ATCC round =

(Queensland) Lakeside ATCC round
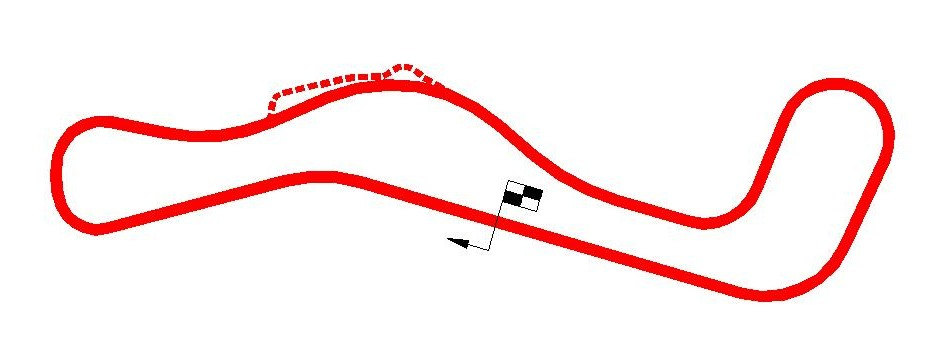
- Race Information
Venue	Lakeside International Raceway
Number of times held	29
First held	1964
Last held	1998
- Race Format
- Race 1
Laps	23
Distance	55 km
- Race 2
Laps	23
Distance	55 km
- Race 3
Laps	23
Distance	55 km
- Last Event (1998)
- Overall Winner
(Australia) Russell Ingall	Perkins Engineering
- Race Winners
(Australia) John Bowe	Dick Johnson Racing
(Australia) Russell Ingall	Perkins Engineering
(Australia) Russell Ingall	Perkins Engineering

The Lakeside ATCC round was an Australian Touring Car Championship motor racing event held at Lakeside International Raceway in Brisbane, Queensland, Australia. The event was held 29 times from 1964 to 1998, with only seven circuits having hosted more events in championship history as of 2021.

== History ==
The Lakeside round of the championship was first held in the era of single-race championships, deciding the Australian Touring Car Championship in 1964 and 1967 for two of Ian Geoghegan's five championship wins. The circuit held two further events as part of a multi-round championship in 1970 and 1971, the second of which was a replacement event for the Warwick Farm Raceway event due to concerns over the circuit's safety barriers. The circuit did not return to the calendar until 1975, but then remained on the calendar for an uninterrupted spell which continued until 1998.

The circuit hosted championship deciders in 1975, 1981 and 1983. The 1981 decider was notable for a famous race-long duel between local driver Dick Johnson's ailing Ford XD Falcon and Peter Brock's Holden VC Commodore. Johnson prevailed and won the first of his five championships in what is considered one of the greatest races in championship history. The 1983 finale was a more controversial affair, in which Gibson Motorsport boycotted the final round, resulting in championship contender George Fury forfeiting any chance of taking his maiden title. Instead, Allan Moffat won his final championship title and the only title for Mazda. Fury went on to win the Lakeside event in 1984, Nissan's first championship round victory, and 1986.

Tony Longhurst won three of his five career rounds at Lakeside in the late 1980s and early 1990s. This comprised winning the only round not won by Dick Johnson Racing in 1988, winning one of the two championship events the circuit held within the 1991 season and winning the final ATCC round to date for BMW in 1992. The circuit's proximity to Lake Kurwongbah saw two events postponed due to flooding, the 1989 event by a fortnight and the 1996 event by one week. In 1994, Larry Perkins, already a four-time Bathurst 1000 winner, won his first championship round.

In 1999, Queensland Raceway, near Ipswich, replaced Lakeside on the championship calendar. Lakeside then appeared on the second-tier V8 Lites calendar in 2000 and 2001, before the circuit closed for eight years in 2001.

== Winners ==
Year	Driver	Team	Car	Report
1964	(Australia) Ian Geoghegan	Total Team	Ford Cortina Mk.I GT	Report
1965 – 1966	not held			
1967	(Australia) Ian Geoghegan	Mustang Team	Ford Mustang GTA	Report
1968 – 1969	not held			
1970	(Australia) Norm Beechey	Shell Racing	Holden HT Monaro GTS350	
1971	(Canada) Allan Moffat	Allan Moffat Racing	Ford Boss 302 Mustang	
1972 – 1974	not held			
1975	(Australia) Colin Bond	Holden Dealer Team	Holden LH Torana SL/R 5000 L34	
1976	(Australia) Colin Bond	Holden Dealer Team	Holden LH Torana SL/R 5000 L34	
1977	(Australia) Peter Brock	Bill Patterson Racing	Holden LH Torana SL/R 5000 L34	
1978	(Canada) Allan Moffat	Allan Moffat Racing	Ford XC Falcon GS500	
1979	(Australia) Bob Morris	Ron Hodgson Motors	Holden LX Torana SS A9X	
1980	(Australia) Peter Brock	Holden Dealer Team	Holden VB Commodore	
1981	(Australia) Dick Johnson	Dick Johnson Racing	Ford XD Falcon	
1982	(Canada) Allan Moffat	Allan Moffat Racing	Mazda RX-7	
1983	(Australia) Peter Brock	Holden Dealer Team	Holden VH Commodore SS	
1984	(Australia) George Fury	Gibson Motorsport	Nissan Bluebird Turbo	
1985	(New Zealand) Jim Richards	JPS Team BMW	BMW 635 CSi	
1986	(Australia) George Fury	Gibson Motorsport	Nissan Skyline DR30 RS	
1987	(New Zealand) Jim Richards	JPS Team BMW	BMW M3	
1988	(Australia) Tony Longhurst	LoGaMo Racing	Ford Sierra RS500	
1989	(Australia) Dick Johnson	Dick Johnson Racing	Ford Sierra RS500	
1990	(Australia) Colin Bond	Colin Bond Racing	Ford Sierra RS500	
1991^{1}	(New Zealand) Jim Richards	Gibson Motorsport	Nissan Skyline R32 GT-R	
1991^{1}	(Australia) Tony Longhurst	LoGaMo Racing	BMW M3 Evolution	
1992	(Australia) Tony Longhurst	LoGaMo Racing	BMW M3 Evolution	
1993	(Australia) Alan Jones	Glenn Seton Racing	Ford EB Falcon	
1994	(Australia) Larry Perkins	Perkins Engineering	Holden VP Commodore	Report
1995	(Australia) Glenn Seton	Glenn Seton Racing	Ford EF Falcon	
1996	(Australia) Craig Lowndes	Holden Racing Team	Holden VR Commodore	
1997	(Australia) John Bowe	Dick Johnson Racing	Ford EL Falcon	
1998	(Australia) Russell Ingall	Perkins Engineering	Holden VS Commodore	

Notes

- ^1 – Lakeside hosted two rounds of the 1991 Australian Touring Car Championship, Round 4 and Round 8.

== Multiple winners ==
=== By driver ===
Wins	Driver	Years
3	(Canada) Allan Moffat	1971, 1978, 1982
3	(Australia) Peter Brock	1977, 1980, 1983
3	(Australia) Colin Bond	1975, 1976, 1990
3	(New Zealand) Jim Richards	1985, 1987, 1991-1
3	(Australia) Tony Longhurst	1988, 1991-2, 1992
2	(Australia) Ian Geoghegan	1964, 1967
2	(Australia) George Fury	1984, 1986
2	(Australia) Dick Johnson	1981, 1989

=== By team ===
Wins	Team
4	Holden Dealer Team
3	Allan Moffat Racing
3	Gibson Motorsport
3	LoGaMo Racing
3	Dick Johnson Racing
2	JPS Team BMW
2	Glenn Seton Racing
2	Perkins Engineering

=== By manufacturer ===
Wins	Manufacturer
11	Ford
10	Holden
4	BMW
3	Nissan

== Event names and sponsors ==
- 1964, 1967, 1970–71, 1975–77, 1979–85, 1987–98: Lakeside
- 1978: Round 7 Presented by Rothmans
- 1986: Motorcraft 100

== See also ==
- List of Australian Touring Car Championship races
