= 1968 Australian Touring Car Championship =

Motor racing competition

Seasons
- ← 1967 1969 →

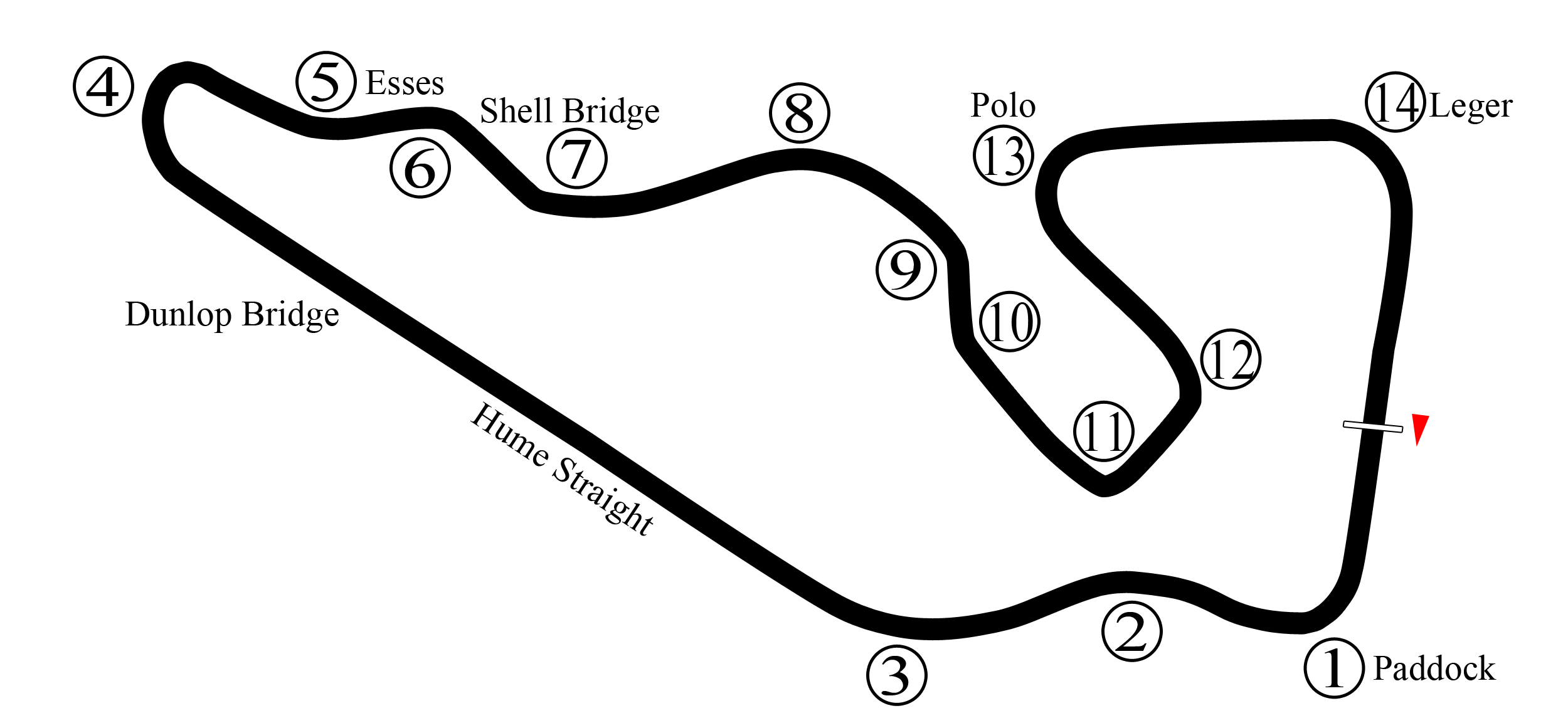
Layout of the Warwick Farm Raceway (1960-1973)

The 1968 Australian Touring Car Championship was a CAMS sanctioned Australian motor racing title open to Group C Improved Production Touring Cars. It was contested over a single race staged at the Warwick Farm circuit in New South Wales, Australia on 8 September 1968. The title, which was the ninth Australian Touring Car Championship, was won by Ian Geoghegan driving a Ford Mustang. It was the final Australian Touring Car Championship held as a single race, with the title being contested over a series of races from 1969 onwards.

== Report ==
Ian Geoghegan qualified on pole position, half a second faster than Norm Beechey who was now driving a Chevrolet Camaro SS. Bob Jane was third on the grid, with Jim McKeown and Peter Manton rounding out the top five. Geoghegan won the start and took the lead into the first corner ahead of Beechey and Jane, with the latter two almost touching halfway through the first lap. McKeown retired on lap 3 with a broken rear axle. Ian Dawson spun on the following lap while Nick Petrilli lost a wheel; a lap later Rod Coppins slowed with a loose exhaust.

Jane's engine blew on lap 9, leaving Beechey as the sole challenger to Geoghegan. Fred Gibson's pit crew displayed a sign reading 'Jane in' to inform him of Jane's retirement, but Gibson misread the sign. He slowed on the following lap and pitted, losing six positions in the process. Beechey retired on lap 12 with mechanical problems, while Foley followed suit on the next lap. This left Geoghegan with a lead of twenty seconds over Paul Fahey and Manton.

Fahey retired on lap 22, while Gibson had been making his way back through the field. Manton ran into problems on lap 28, allowing the Porsche 911 of Alan Hamilton into second and the Morris Cooper S of Darrell King into third. King attempted to close the gap to Hamilton, but collided with Graham Ryan and backed off to settle for third place. However, on the final lap, Hamilton went off the circuit and damaged a rear guard, folding it onto the tyre. King went through into second and finished over ninety seconds behind race winner Geoghegan, while Hamilton brought his car home with a blown tyre for third.

== Results ==
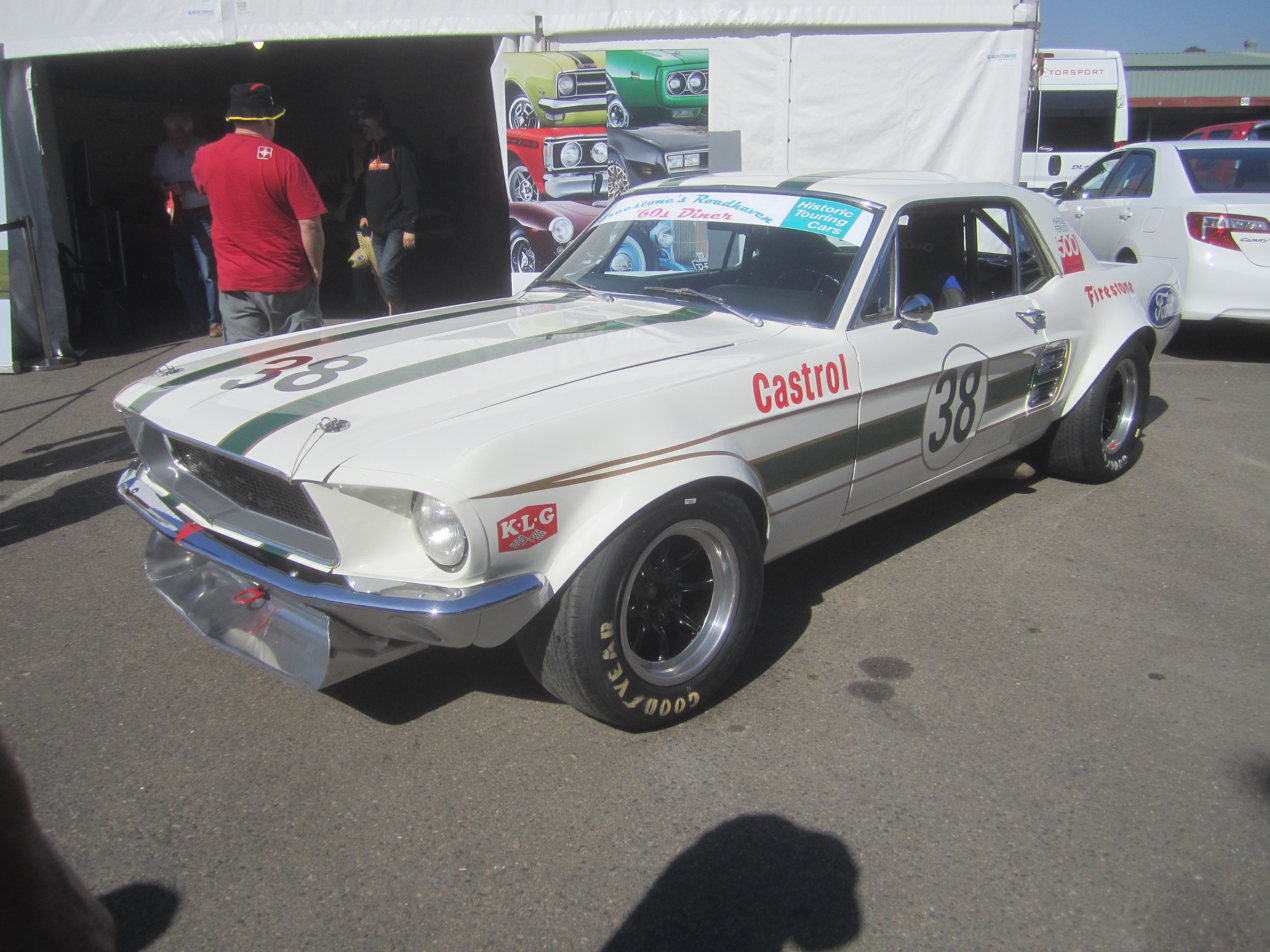
The Ford Mustang with which Ian Geoghegan won the championship. The car is pictured in 2013 in different specification.

Class winners are indicated by bold text.

Pos.	Class	No.	Driver	Entrant	Car	Laps	Time/Retired
1	Over 3000cc	1	(Australia) Ian Geoghegan	The Mustang Team	Ford Mustang	34	59:06.8
2	1101–1500cc	26	(Australia) Darrell King	D. King	Morris Cooper S	34	+1:31.0
3	1501–2000cc	19	(Australia) Alan Hamilton	Porsche Distributors (Aust./N.Z.) Pty Ltd	Porsche 911	34	+2:07.0
4	Over 3000cc	2	(Australia) Fred Gibson	N.E. Allen Competition Pty Ltd	Ford Mustang	33	+1 lap
5	Up to 1100cc	9	(Australia) Laurie Stewart	Brian Foley Motors	Morris Cooper S	33	+1 lap
6	Up to 1100cc	30	(Australia) John Millyard	Martinz Place	Morris Cooper S	33	+1 lap
7	1101–1500cc	12	(Australia) Peter Manton	Peter Manton Racing	Morris Cooper S	33	+1 lap
8	1101–1500cc	32	(Australia) Graeme Spence	K. Townsend	Austin Cooper S	33	+1 lap
9	Up to 1100cc	29	(Australia) John Humphrey	Humphreys Golden Fleece Service Station	Austin Cooper S	33	+1 lap
10	Over 3000cc	17	(Australia) Bryan Thomson	Bryan Thomson Racing	Ford Mustang	32	+2 laps
11	Up to 1100cc	37	(Australia) Richard Thurston	A.M.I. Racing Team	Toyota Corolla	31	+3 laps
12	2001–3000cc	23	(Australia) Herb Taylor	H.E. Taylor	Holden EH	28	+6 laps
13	2001–3000cc	24	(Australia) Graham Ryan	Graham Ryan Auto Repairs	Holden EH	28	+6 laps
Ret	Over 3000cc	35	(New Zealand) Ian Dawson	I.W. (Red) Dawson	Ford Mustang	23	Tyres
Ret	Over 3000cc	6	(New Zealand) Paul Fahey	P.B. Fahey	Ford Mustang	21	Gearbox
Ret	1101–1500cc	11	(Australia) Phil Barnes	Phil Barnes Motor Service	Morris Cooper S	19	
Ret	1101–1500cc	28	(Australia) Fred Seery	F.R. Seery	Morris Cooper S	15	
Ret	1101–1500cc	8	(Australia) Brian Foley	Brian Foley Motors Pty Ltd	Morris Cooper S	12	Mechanical
Ret	1501–2000cc	16	(Australia) Chris Brauer	C.D. Brauer	Ford Cortina Mark I Lotus	12	Steering
Ret	Over 3000cc	4	(Australia) Norm Beechey	Norm Beechey	Chevrolet Camaro SS	11	Mechanical
Ret	1101–1500cc	20	(Australia) Don Holland	Don Holland Motors	Morris Cooper S	8	
Ret	Over 3000cc	3	(Australia) Bob Jane	Bob Jane's Autoland	Ford Mustang	8	Camshaft
Ret	1101–1500cc	33	(Australia) Barrie Broomhall	Barrie Broomhall Motors	Morris Cooper S	6	
Ret	Over 3000cc	10	(New Zealand) Rod Coppins	R. Coppins	Ford Mustang	6	Exhaust
Ret	1101–1500cc	27	(Australia) Bruce Jones	Bruce A. Jones	Morris Cooper S	4	
Ret	2001–3000cc	21	(Australia) Nick Petrilli	N. Petrilli	Holden EH	3	Wheel
Ret	1501–2000cc	7	(Australia) Jim McKeown	Jim McKeown Motors	Ford Cortina Mark II Lotus	2	Axle
Ret	1101–1500cc	38	(Australia) Howie Sangster	H.G. Sangster	Morris Cooper S	1	
Ret	2001–3000cc	22	(Australia) Martin Chenery	M.R. Chenery	Holden EH	0	
Ret	Up to 1100cc	36	(Australia) Bob Morris	Bill Buckle Autos	Toyota Corolla	0	

== Statistics ==
- Pole position: Ian Geoghegan, 1:42.8
- Race day attendance: More than 26,000
- Fastest lap: Ian Geoghegan, 1:43.0
- Race distance: 34 laps, 123.08 km
- Average speed: 124.93 km/h
