= Jim McKeown (racing driver) =

Australian racing driver

- Nationality: Australian

Australian Touring Car Championship
- Years active: 1964–1972
- Teams: Neptune Racing Team; Tridents Racing Team; Shell Racing Team
- Starts: 21
- Wins: 2
- Poles: 1
- Best finish: 2nd in 1970

Previous series
- Toby Lee Series

James Walter McKeown (c.1937/1938 – 22 May 2023) was an Australian racing driver who competed in the Australian Touring Car Championship from 1964 to 1972, with the best finish of 2nd in the 1970 ATCC. McKeown was part of the successful Neptune Racing Team alongside Norm Beechey and Peter Manton. The team later became known as the Shell Racing Team and consisted of McKeown in a Porsche 911S, Beechey in a Holden Monaro GTS350 and Manton in a Morris Cooper S.

In addition to the Australian Touring Car Championship, McKeown also competed in the Bathurst 500 and its forerunner at Phillip Island on four occasions. He and George Reynolds took the Class D win at the 1962 Armstrong 500, five laps off the lead. McKeown drove for the Ford Works Team under Harry Firth in the 1968 Hardie-Ferodo 500, finishing 42nd with Spencer Martin in the team's only XT Falcon GT fitted with an automatic transmission. In the 1970s, McKeown raced Porsches in the Sports Sedan category, achieving a second-place finish in the 1974 Toby Lee Series at Oran Park.

== Death ==
McKeown died peacefully on 22 May 2023, at the age of 85.

== Career results ==
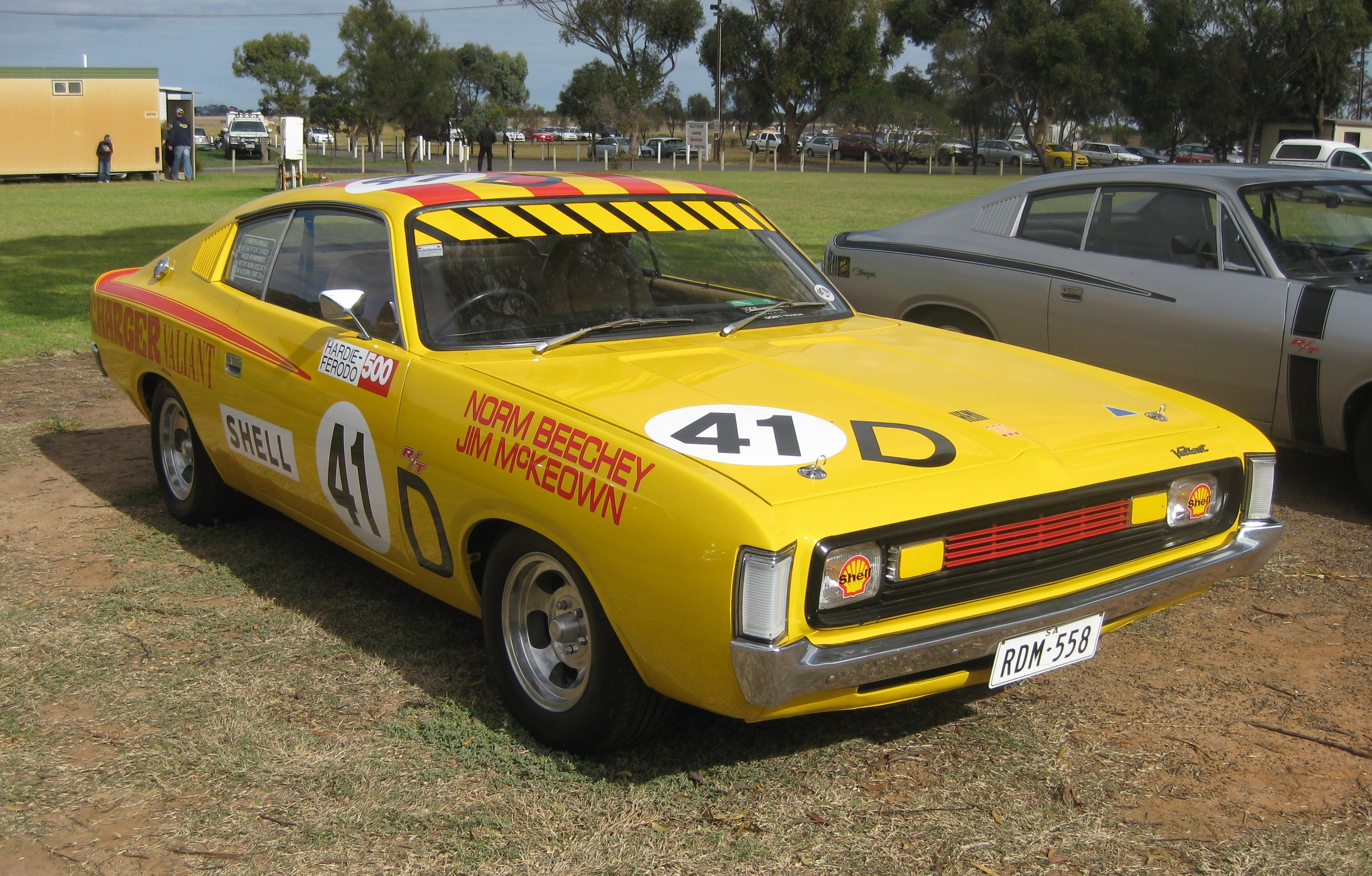
A recreation of the Chrysler VH Valiant Charger R/T E38 which was driven to 6th place in Class D of the 1971 Hardie-Ferodo 500 by Norm Beechey & Jim McKeown

Season	Title	Position	Car	Team
1967	Australian Touring Car Championship	6th	Ford Lotus Cortina	Tridents Racing Team
1969	Australian Touring Car Championship	4th	Ford Lotus Cortina	Jim McKeown Motors
1970	Australian Touring Car Championship	2nd	Porsche 911S	Shell Racing Team
1971	Australian Touring Car Championship	4th	Porsche 911S	Shell Racing Team
1972	Australian Touring Car Championship	13th	Alfa Romeo 2000 GTV	Shell Racing Team
1973	Toby Lee Series	4th	Porsche Carrera	
1974	Toby Lee Series	2nd	Porsche Carrera	

=== Complete Australian Touring Car Championship results ===
(key) (Races in bold indicate pole position) (Races in italics indicate fastest lap)

Year	Team	Car	1	2	3	4	5	6	7	8	DC	Points
1964	Neptune Racing Team	Ford Cortina Mark I Lotus	LAK; Ret								NC	-
1965	Neptune Racing Team	Ford Cortina Mark I Lotus	SAN; Ret								NC	-
1967	Tridents Racing Team	Ford Cortina Mark I Lotus	LAK; 6								NC	-
1968	Jim McKeown Motors	Ford Cortina Mark II Lotus	WAR; Ret								NC	-
1969	Jim McKeown Motors	Ford Cortina Mark II Lotus	CAL	BAT	MAL; 4	SUR; 3	SYM; 3				4th	11
1970	Jim McKeown Shell Racing Team	Porsche 911S	CAL; 3	BAT; 4	SAN; Ret	MAL; Ret	WAR; 1	LAK; 3	SYM; 1		2nd	29
1971	Shell Racing	Porsche 911S	SYM; 4	CAL; 3	SAN; 3	SUR; 5	MAL; 4	LAK; 6	ORA; 4		4th	20
1972	Shell Racing Team	Alfa Romeo 2000 GTV	SYM	CAL; DNS	BAT; 7	SAN; Ret	AIR	WAR	SUR	ORA	13th	6
