= 1965 Australian Tourist Trophy =

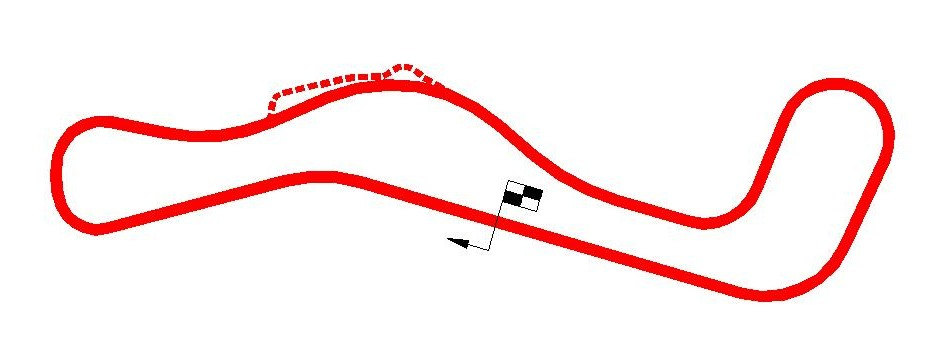
Layout of the Lakeside International Raceway

The 1965 Australian Tourist Trophy was a motor race staged at the Lakeside circuit in Queensland, Australia on 14 November 1965. It was the ninth annual Australian Tourist Trophy race. The race was open to sports cars as defined by the Confederation of Australian Motor Sport (CAMS) in its Appendix C regulations, and it was recognized by CAMS as the Australian championship for sports cars. It was won by Ian Geoghegan driving a Lotus 23b.

== Race review ==
Australian international driver Frank Gardner set the fastest practice time driving Alec Mildren's Mildren Maserati, but an engine failure during a preliminary heat resulted in Gardner being a non-starter in the Tourist Trophy. Ian Geoghegan, driving a Lotus 23, dominated the race with Greg Cusack (Lotus 23) placed second and Spencer Martin (Ferrari 250LM) third. Englishman Ken Miles, driving a Shelby Cobra 427 entered by Shelby American, posed a threat to leaders Geoghegan and Cusack until a suspension failure on lap 34 led to his retirement.

== Results ==
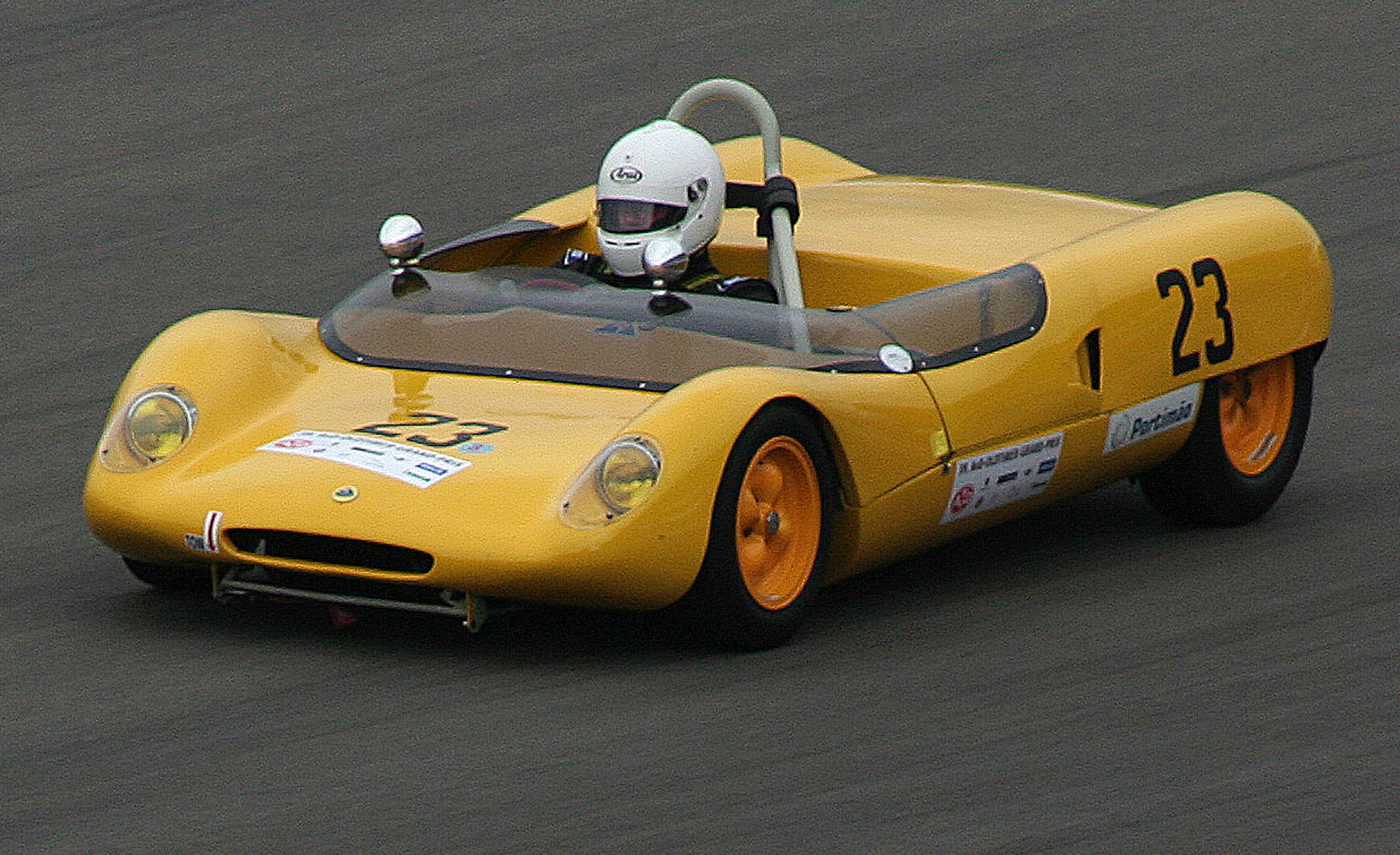
Ian Geoghegan won the 1965 Australian Tourist Trophy driving a Lotus 23b, similar to the car pictured above

Position	Driver	No.	Car	Entrant	Time / laps
1	Ian Geoghegan	5	Lotus 23b	Total Team	85:38.9
2	Greg Cusack	7	Lotus 23	G.Cusack	85:59.6
3	Spencer Martin	1	Ferrari 250LM	Scuderia Veloce	80
4	Bob Jane	6	Jaguar E Type	R. Jane	77
5	Frank Demuth	26	Lola	Lane Cove Auto Port	76
6	Wal Donnelly		Turner	W. Donnelly	74
?	Bill Gates		Lotus Elan		?
?	Errol Sakzewski	91	Porsche Carrera		?
?	Blair Salter	14	Elfin MG		?
DNF	Glyn Scott		Lotus 15	Ann Thompson	?
DNF	Ken Miles	4	Shelby Cobra 427	Shelby American	34
DNF	Denis Geary	3	Lotus 23B		23
DNF	Les Howard		Lotus 23		22
DNS	Frank Gardner	2	Mildren Maserati	Alec Mildren Racing	-
DNS	Ron Thorp	69	AC Cobra		-

=== Race statistics ===
- Race distance: 83 laps – 125 miles (200 km)
- Pole position: Ian Geoghegan (Lotus 23b), 59.9s
- Number of starters: 13
- Number of finishers: not yet ascertained
- Winner's race time: 1:25:38.90
- Winner's average speed: 87.23 mph
- Fastest lap: 60.9 - Ian Geoghegan
