= 1971 Australian Touring Car Championship =

Motor racing competition

Seasons
- ← 1970 1972 →

The 1971 Australian Touring Car Championship was an Australian motor racing competition for Group C Improved Production Touring Cars and Group E Series Production Touring Cars. It was authorised by the Confederation of Australian Motor Sport as an Australian National Title. The championship, which was the 12th running of the Australian Touring Car Championship, began at Symmons Plains Raceway on 1 March 1971 and ended at Oran Park Raceway on 8 August after seven heats.

Bob Jane won his third Australian Touring Car Championship, driving his 7.0-litre Chevrolet Camaro ZL-1. Allan Moffat finished runner-up in his Ford Boss 302 Mustang, while Ian Geoghegan was third in his Ford Mustang. Defending champion Norm Beechey finished fifth in the series, suffering from reliability problems with his Holden HT Monaro GTS350. Beechey only finished two heats of the series, one of which was a victory in the second heat at Calder Park Raceway.

== Drivers ==
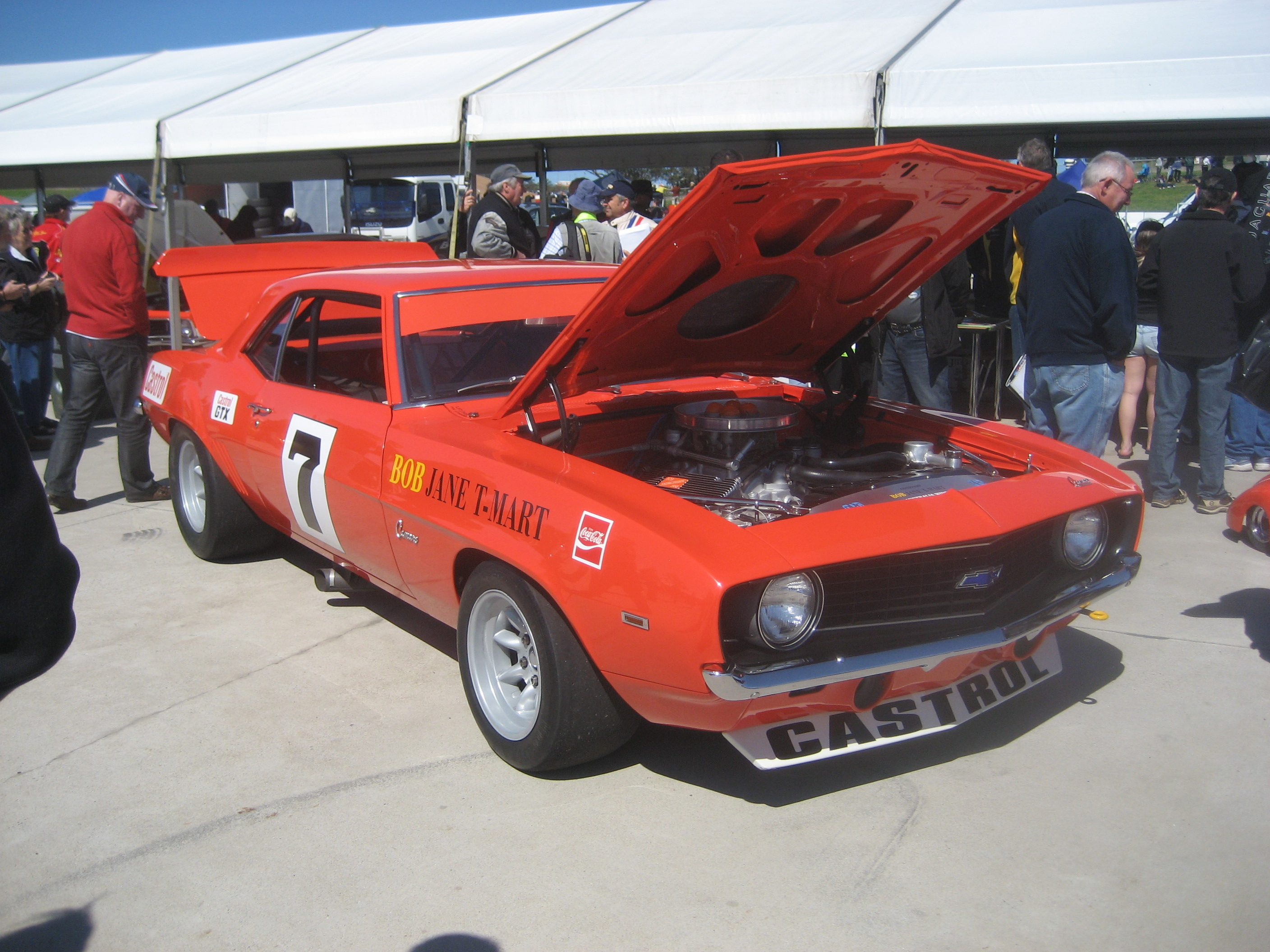
The 1969 Chevrolet Camaro ZL-1 in which Bob Jane won the championship. The car is pictured in 2010.

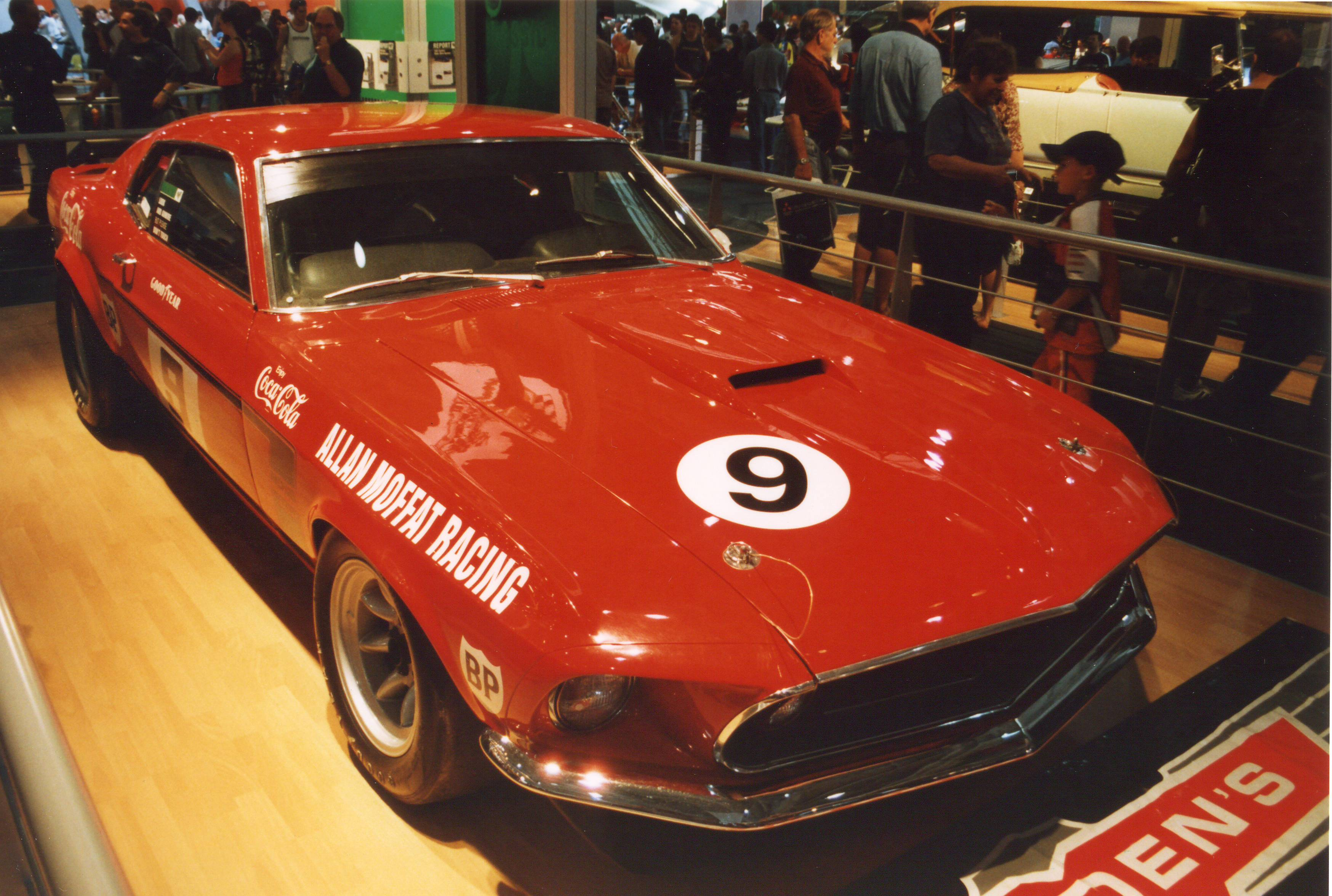
The Ford Mustang Boss 302 in which Allan Moffat placed second in the championship. The car is pictured in 2003.

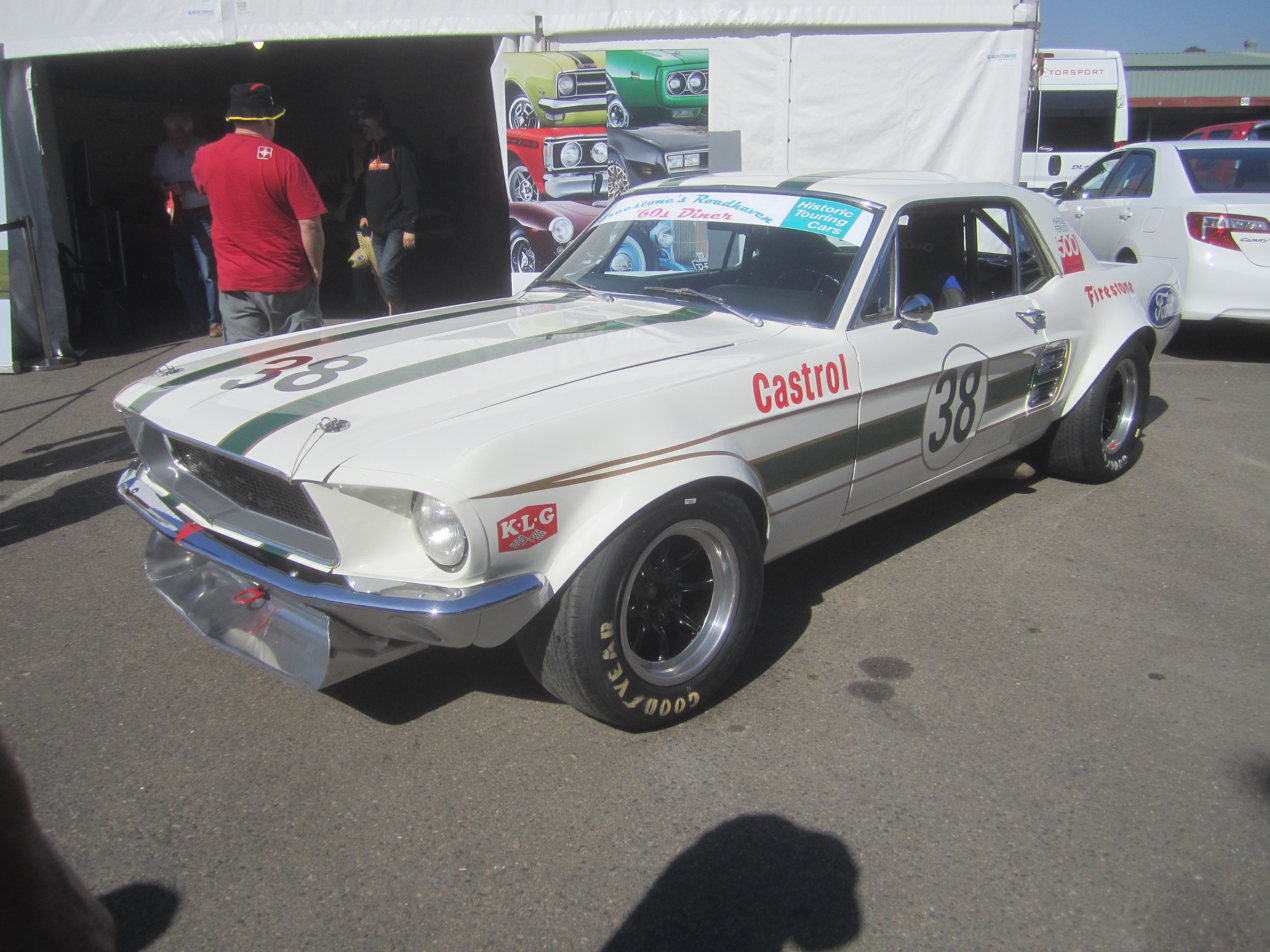
The 1967 Ford Mustang in which Ian Geoghegan placed third. The car is pictured in 2013.

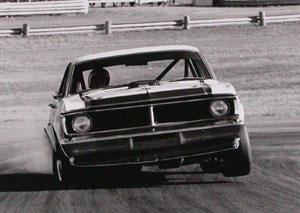
John French placed equal sixth driving Ford XY Falcon GTHOs. He is pictured above driving the Geoghegan's Sporty Cars entry at the Lakeside heat.

The following drivers competed in the 1971 championship. The list is not exhaustive.

| Entrant | Car | No. | Driver |
|---|---|---|---|
| Shell Racing | Holden HT Monaro GTS350 | 1 | (Australia) Norm Beechey |
| Shell Racing | Porsche 911S | 3 | (Australia) Jim McKeown |
| Geoghegan's Sporty Cars | Ford Mustang | 4; 11 | (Australia) Ian Geoghegan |
| B.S. Stillwell and Co | Ford Escort Mark I Twin Cam | 5 | (Australia) Graham Ritter |
| Bob Jane Racing Team | Chevrolet Camaro ZL-1 | 6; 7 | (Australia) Bob Jane |
| Allan Moffat Racing; Geoghegan's Sporty Cars | Ford XY Falcon GTHO Phase III | 6; 5 | (Australia) John French |
| Chesterfield Filter Racing | Alfa Romeo GTAm | 8 | (Australia) Brian Foley |
| Coca-Cola Team A.M.R. | Ford Boss 302 Mustang | 9; 91 | (Canada) Allan Moffat |
| Ian Hindmarsh Motors | Ford Escort Mark I Twin Cam | 10 | (Australia) Bill Fanning |
| Brayson Motors | Volvo 122S | 11 | (Australia) Andrew Miedecke |
| Dick Johnson Shell Racing | Holden LC Torana GTR XU-1 | 14 | (Australia) Dick Johnson |
| R Kent | Morris Cooper S | 16 | (Australia) Robert Kent |
| Bryan Thomson | Chevrolet Camaro | 17 | (Australia) Bryan Thomson |
| M. Brewster | Morris Cooper S | 18 | (Australia) Trevor Meehan |
| Rushford Engineering | Ford Escort Mark I Twin Cam | 20 | (Australia) John Rushford |
| Shell Racing | Morris Cooper S | 30 | (Australia) Graham Bishop |
| Andrew McComb Racing | Morris Cooper S | 40 | (Australia) Andrew McComb |
| Holden Dealer Team | Holden LC Torana GTR XU-1 | 44 | (Australia) Colin Bond |
| Noel Devine | Holden LC Torana GTR XU-1 | 62 | (Australia) Noel Devine |
| | Morris Cooper S | 90 | (Australia) Robin Bessant |
| | Holden LC Torana | | (Australia) Brian Aldred |
| Terry Allan | Chevrolet Camaro | | (Australia) Terry Allan |
| Blanchard Motors | Holden LC Torana GTR XU-1 | | (Australia) Graeme Blanchard |
| | Ford Mustang | | (Australia) Tony Calvert |
| AMI | Toyota Corolla | | (Australia) Rob Davies |
| | Holden LC Torana GTR XU-1 | | (Australia) George Giesberts |
| Bob Jane Racing Team | Ford Mustang | | (Australia) John Harvey |
| John Lewis | Holden LC Torana 2.7 | | (Australia) John Lewis |
| City State Racing Team | Holden LC Torana GTR XU-1 | | (Australia) Malcolm Ramsay |
| Allan Reid | Holden LC Torana GTR XU-1 | | (Australia) Allan Reid |
| Terry Robertson | Holden LC Torana GTR XU-1 | | (Australia) Terry Robertson |
| | Holden EH | | (Australia) Herb Taylor |
| City State Racing Team | Holden LC Torana GTR XU-1 | | (Australia) John Walker |
| | Ford Escort Mark I Twin Cam | | (Australia) Garth Wigston |
| Woodward Racing P/L | Holden LC Torana GTR XU-1 | | (Australia) Peter Woodward |
| Graham Slater | Datsun 1600 | | (Australia) Graham Slater |
| Jim Murcott | Ford Escort Mark I Twin Cam | | (Australia) Jim Murcott |

== Calendar ==
The championship was contested over a series of seven heats.

| Heat | Heat name | Circuit | Location | Date | Winner | Car | Entrant |
|---|---|---|---|---|---|---|---|
| 1 | (Tasmania) Tasmanian Touring Car Championship | Symmons Plains Racing Circuit | Launceston, Tasmania | 1 March | Allan Moffat | Ford Boss 302 Mustang | Coca-Cola Team A.M.R. |
| 2 | (Victoria (state)) Calder | Calder Park Raceway | Melbourne, Victoria | 21 March | Norm Beechey | Holden HT Monaro GTS350 | Shell Racing |
| 3 | (Victoria (state)) Marlboro Southern Sixty | Sandown Raceway | Melbourne, Victoria | 14 April | Bob Jane | Chevrolet Camaro | Bob Jane Racing Team |
| 4 | (Queensland) Surfers Paradise | Surfers Paradise International Raceway | Surfers Paradise, Queensland | 14 May | Allan Moffat | Ford Boss 302 Mustang | Coca-Cola Team A.M.R. |
| 5 | (South Australia) South Australian Touring Car Championship | Mallala Race Circuit | Mallala, South Australia | 14 June | Bob Jane | Chevrolet Camaro | Bob Jane Racing Team |
| 6 | (Queensland) Lakeside | Lakeside International Raceway | Brisbane, Queensland | 25 July | Allan Moffat | Ford Boss 302 Mustang | Coca-Cola Team A.M.R. |
| 7 | (New South Wales) Sydney Gold Cup | Oran Park Raceway | Sydney, New South Wales | 8 August | Bob Jane | Chevrolet Camaro | Bob Jane Racing Team |

== Race summaries ==
=== Symmons Plains ===
Bob Jane held the fastest time in official practice for the majority of the session with a time of 1:00.6. Allan Moffat came out with twenty minutes remaining and equalled Jane's time and was set to go faster until he ran off the circuit and damaged his front spoiler. In response, Jane set a time of 1:00.3 to take pole position ahead of Moffat, Ian Geoghegan and Norm Beechey.

The race was held in wet conditions and Jane and Geoghegan led away from the line after Moffat made a bad gear change. Jim McKeown got squeezed between John Harvey and Terry Allan, while Graham Ritter was forced onto the grass when Harvey got sideways. Geoghegan made a mistake at the hairpin and allowed Moffat back through to second place, while Allan, who started on slick tyres, spun and fell to the back of the field. Allan retired a few laps later with a blown gasket.

Moffat passed Jane fat the end of the back straight on lap 5 and began to pull away. Jane spun on lap 8, allowing Beechey into second place. Jane rejoined in front of Geoghegan and McKeown, around 25 seconds behind Beechey. McKeown passed Geoghegan for fourth, while Harvey retired with a seized engine. With the track drying out, Geoghegan took fourth place back from McKeown on lap 27, with the latter suffering from a clutch problem. Beechey began to close in on Moffat, whose lead dropped to as low as 2.5 seconds when he was held up by McKeown, while Jane was catching both Beechey and Moffat. Once clear of McKeown, Moffat was able to extend his lead again, and it became even larger when Beechey's engine blew on lap 37. Moffat took victory, five seconds ahead of Jane, while Geoghegan finished in third place, forty seconds off the lead.

=== Calder ===
After dominating the opening heat of the championship both Bob Jane and Allan Moffat retired from the Calder race. Jane's clutch failed on the first lap while Moffat retired with an overheating engine on lap 24, having already lost a number of places after leading early in the race. Norm Beechey took the lead from Moffat on lap 15 and led to the finish, followed by Ian Geoghegan and Jim McKeown. Geoghegan's second place elevated him into the championship lead with Moffat and Beechey tied for second place.

=== Sandown ===
Bob Jane and Allan Moffat continued their strong form at Sandown. The pair pulled away from the field in the first half the race to be twenty seconds clear of third-placed Ian Geoghegan and a lap ahead of the rest of the field. Norm Beechey retired with an engine problem which was leaking oil onto the clutch. Jane then encountered a problem when his car became jammed in top gear, allowing Moffat into the lead of the race.

Moffat was black-flagged on lap 25 due to a transmission oil cooler line which had come undone and was hanging underneath the car, but he continued on despite the black flag being held out on the subsequent laps. Moffat finally stopped on the last lap and, with the oil cooler line adjudged as no risk, went on to take victory. However, he was disqualified for ignoring the black flags. This gave the victory to Jane, who had stayed ahead of Geoghegan despite his problem, while Jim McKeown completed the podium.

=== Surfers Paradise ===
Allan Moffat dominated the fourth heat of the championship at Surfers Paradise. He qualified on pole position, set a new lap record and won the race by a margin of 35 seconds. Bob Jane finished second and took the championship lead from Ian Geoghegan, who finished third despite being pressured by John French, driving Moffat's Ford Falcon GTHO, for much of the race. Moffat's victory moved him to third place in the championship, just three points adrift of Jane.

=== Mallala ===
Bob Jane extended his championship lead by taking victory at Mallala. Ian Geoghegan applied pressure to Jane late in the race but was unable to pass him, finishing three-tenths of a second behind. Allan Moffat finished third despite a spin early on and then going off the track while lapping Norm Beechey. Jim McKeown and Brian Foley finished fourth and fifth respectively, one lap down on Jane, while local driver Graham Bishop took the final point in sixth place.

=== Lakeside ===
The championship tightened up at Lakeside, with Ian Geoghegan, Bob Jane and Allan Moffat finishing the race in reverse order to their respective championship positions. Moffat took an easy win from pole position, leading all the way. Jane looked set for second place until a wheel bearing failure in the closing laps, which allowed Geoghegan into second and dropped Jane to third. Norm Beechey finished fourth, only the second time he had finished a race during the season, while John French finished fifth in Geoghegan's Ford Falcon GTHO. The result left Jane in the championship lead with 34 points, Geoghegan in second place with 32 and Moffat in third with 31.

=== Oran Park ===
Bob Jane came into the final heat in the championship lead with 34 points. Ian Geoghegan was second on 32, ahead of Allan Moffat with 31. With the points system giving nine points for victory and six points for second place, if any of the three championship contenders won the race they would also claim the title. Moffat took pole position, 1.2 seconds ahead of Jane and 1.7 ahead of Geoghegan. Moffat won the start, while Jane missed a gear and lost second place to Geoghegan. Moffat built a small lead in the opening laps, but once Jane passed Geoghegan the gap began to close. Moffat stopped on lap 16 with his car stuck in second gear, allowing Jane and Geoghegan past. Moffat was able to get his car moving shortly afterwards and rejoined the race.

Moffat began closing the fifteen second gap to Jane at around one second per lap. He struggled to find a way past Geoghegan, eventually doing so around the outside of the first corner, but not without making contact. With his lead down to six seconds, Jane began to push a little harder and was able to hold the gap. A spectator then drove a Valiant Pacer road car onto the circuit, entering at the Esses and pulling up at the entry to the pit lane. In the process, he was almost hit by Moffat, who did not recall seeing the Pacer after the race. Moffat closed in on Jane in the final six laps, getting to within a few car lengths at the final corner. Jane held on to take the race win and the championship, while Moffat's second place saw him overtake Geoghegan, who finished third, for the runner-up spot in the points standings.

== Points system ==
Points were awarded as follows to the top six finishers in each heat.

| Position | 1st | 2nd | 3rd | 4th | 5th | 6th |
| Points | 9 | 6 | 4 | 3 | 2 | 1 |

Any six of the seven heats could be counted towards each drivers total.

== Championship standings ==
| Pos. | Driver | Car | Sym (Tasmania) | Cal (Victoria (state)) | San (Victoria (state)) | Sur (Queensland) | Mal (South Australia) | Lak (Queensland) | Ora (New South Wales) | Pts. |
|---|---|---|---|---|---|---|---|---|---|---|
| 1 | Bob Jane | Chevrolet Camaro | **2** | Ret | **1** | 2 | **1** | 3 | 1 | 43 |
| 2 | Allan Moffat | Ford Boss 302 Mustang | 1 | **Ret** | DSQ | **1** | 3 | **1** | **2** | 37 |
| 3 | Ian Geoghegan | Ford Mustang | 3 | 2 | 2 | 3 | 2 | 2 | 3 | 36 |
| 4 | Jim McKeown | Porsche 911S | 4 | 3 | 3 | 5 | 4 | 6 | 4 | 20 |
| 5 | Norm Beechey | Holden HT Monaro GTS350 | Ret | 1 | Ret | Ret | Ret | 4 | Ret | 12 |
| 6 | Graham Ritter | Ford Escort Mark I Twin Cam | 5 | Ret | 4 | | | | | 5 |
| 6 | John French | Ford XY Falcon GTHO Phase III | | | | 4 | | 5 | | 5 |
| 8 | John Rushford | Ford Escort Mark I Twin Cam | | 4 | | | | | | 3 |
| 8 | Brian Foley | Alfa Romeo GTAm | | | | 6 | 5 | 7 | | 3 |
| 10 | Trevor Meehan | Morris Cooper S | | 5 | | | | | | 2 |
| 10 | Colin Bond | Holden LC Torana GTR XU-1 | | | 5 | | | | | 2 |
| 10 | Bill Fanning | Ford Escort Mark I Twin Cam | | | | | | | 5 | 2 |
| 13 | Bob Kent | Morris Cooper S | 6 | | | | | | | 1 |
| 13 | Andrew McComb | Morris Cooper S | | 6 | | | | | | 1 |
| 13 | Noel Devine | Holden LC Torana GTR XU-1 | | | 6 | | | | | 1 |
| 13 | Graeme Bishop | Morris Cooper S | | | | | 6 | | | 1 |
| 13 | Dick Johnson | Holden LC Torana GTR XU-1 | | | | 7 | | 8 | 6 | 1 |
| Pos. | Driver | Car | Sym (Tasmania) | Cal (Victoria (state)) | San (Victoria (state)) | Sur (Queensland) | Mal (South Australia) | Lak (Queensland) | Ora (New South Wales) | Pts. |

| Colour | Result |
|---|---|
| Gold | Winner |
| Silver | Second place |
| Bronze | Third place |
| Green | Points classification |
| Blue | Non-points classification |
| Blue | Non-classified finish (NC) |
| Purple | Retired, not classified (Ret) |
| Red | Did not qualify (DNQ) |
| Red | Did not pre-qualify (DNPQ) |
| Black | Disqualified (DSQ) |
| White | Did not start (DNS) |
| White | Withdrew (WD) |
| White | Race cancelled (C) |
| Blank | Did not practice (DNP) |
| Blank | Did not arrive (DNA) |
| Blank | Excluded (EX) |

Bold - Pole position
