= 1963 Australian Tourist Trophy =

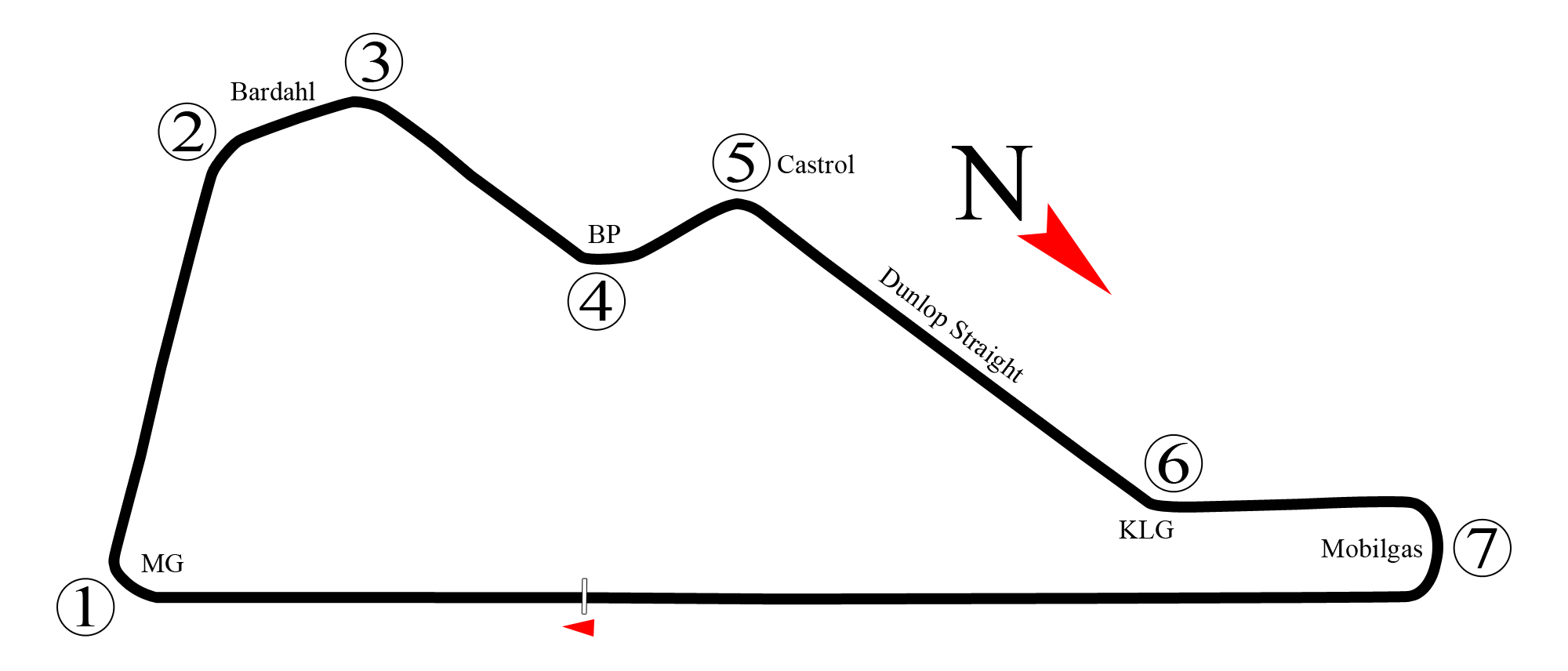
Layout of the Lowood Airfield Circuit (1946-1966)

The 1963 Australian Tourist Trophy was a motor race staged at the Lowood circuit in Queensland, Australia on 9 June 1963. It was the seventh annual Australian Tourist Trophy race, and it was recognized by the Confederation of Australian Motor Sport as the Australian championship for sports cars. The race, which was organised by the Queensland Racing Drivers' Club, was won by Ian Geoghegan, driving a Lotus 23.

== Results ==
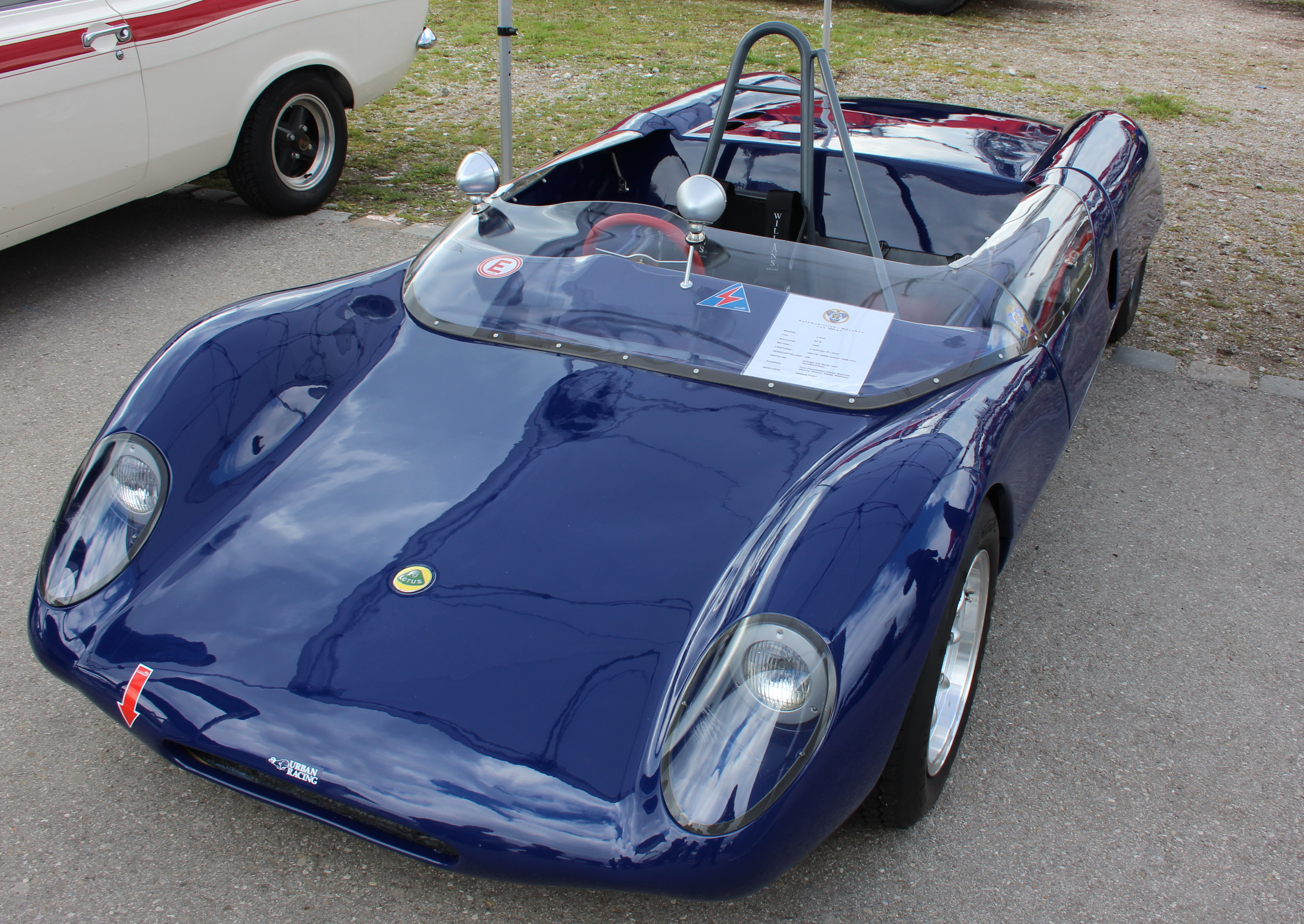
Ian Geoghegan won the race driving a Lotus 23 similar to the example pictured above

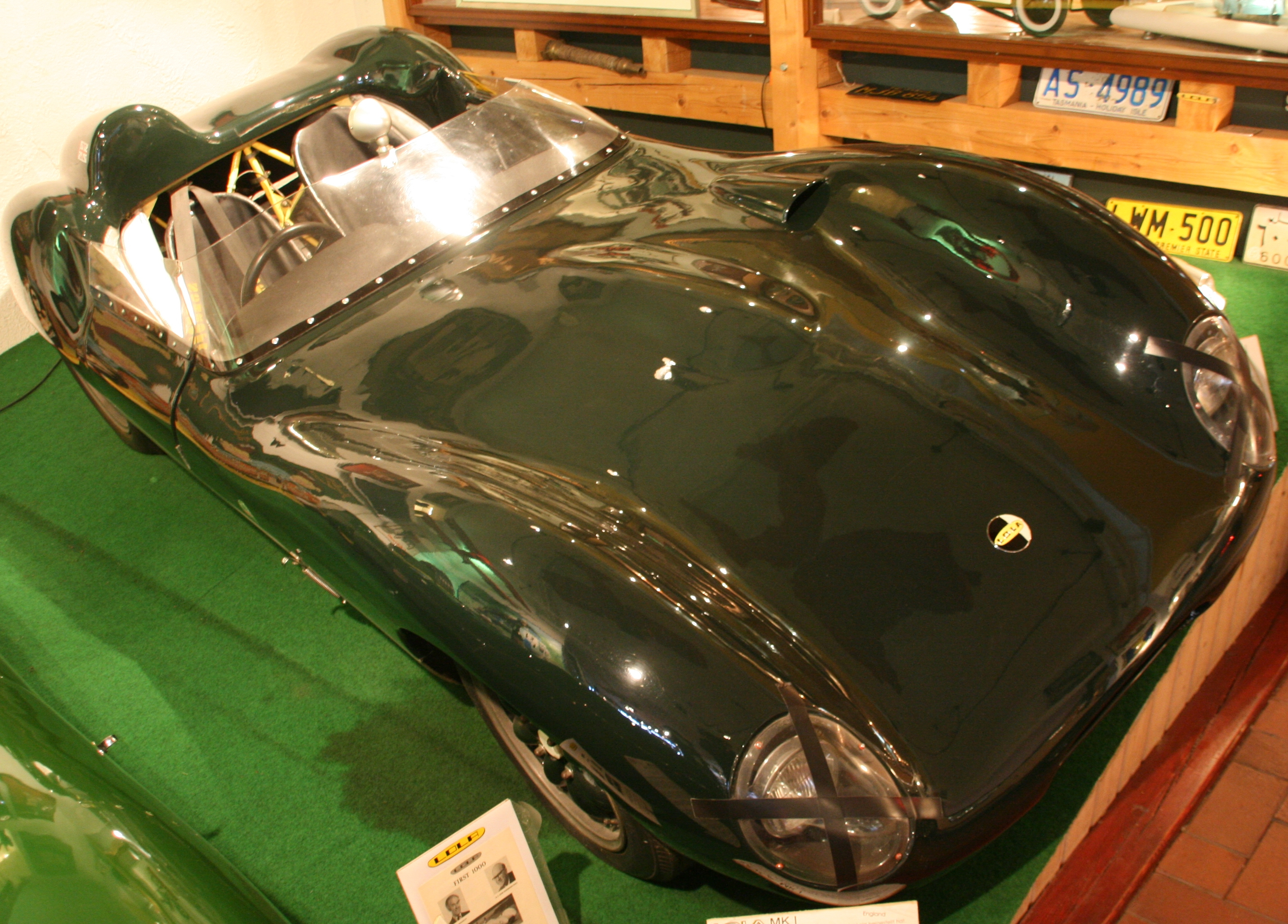
John Martin placed second in a Lola similar to the car pictured above.

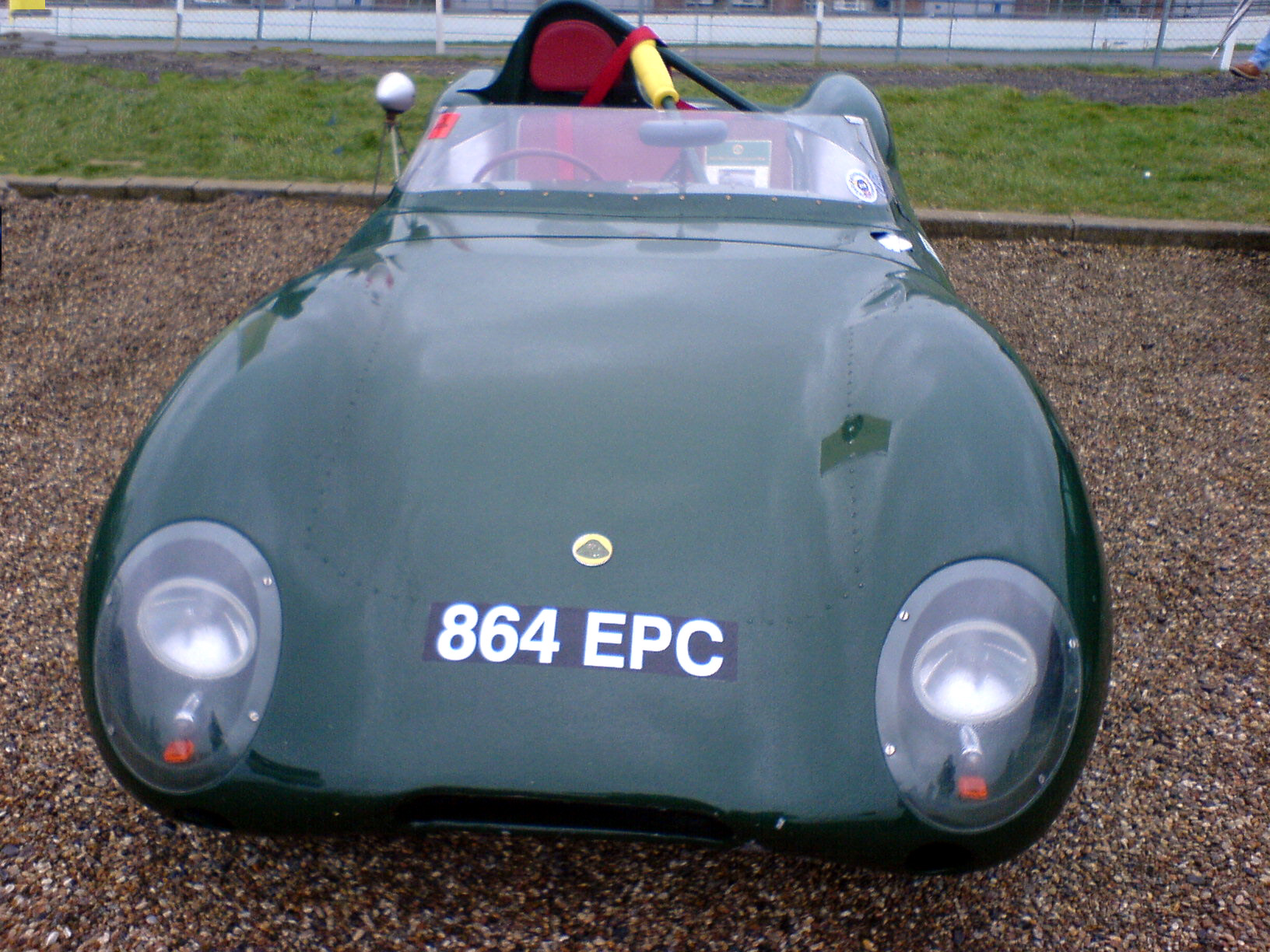
Les Howard placed third driving a Lotus XI, an example of which is pictured above.

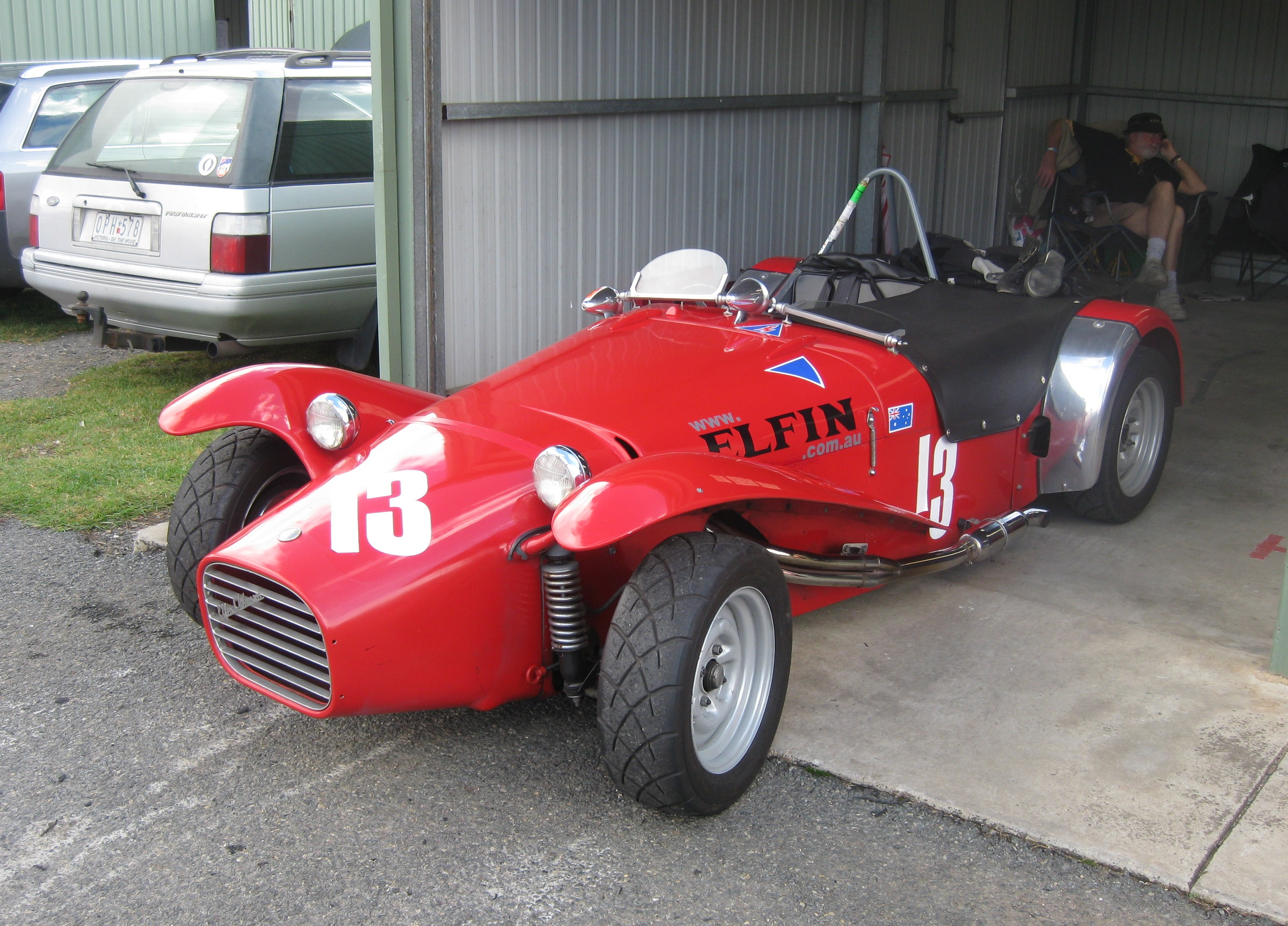
Bill Gates placed fourth in an Elfin Clubman similar to the above

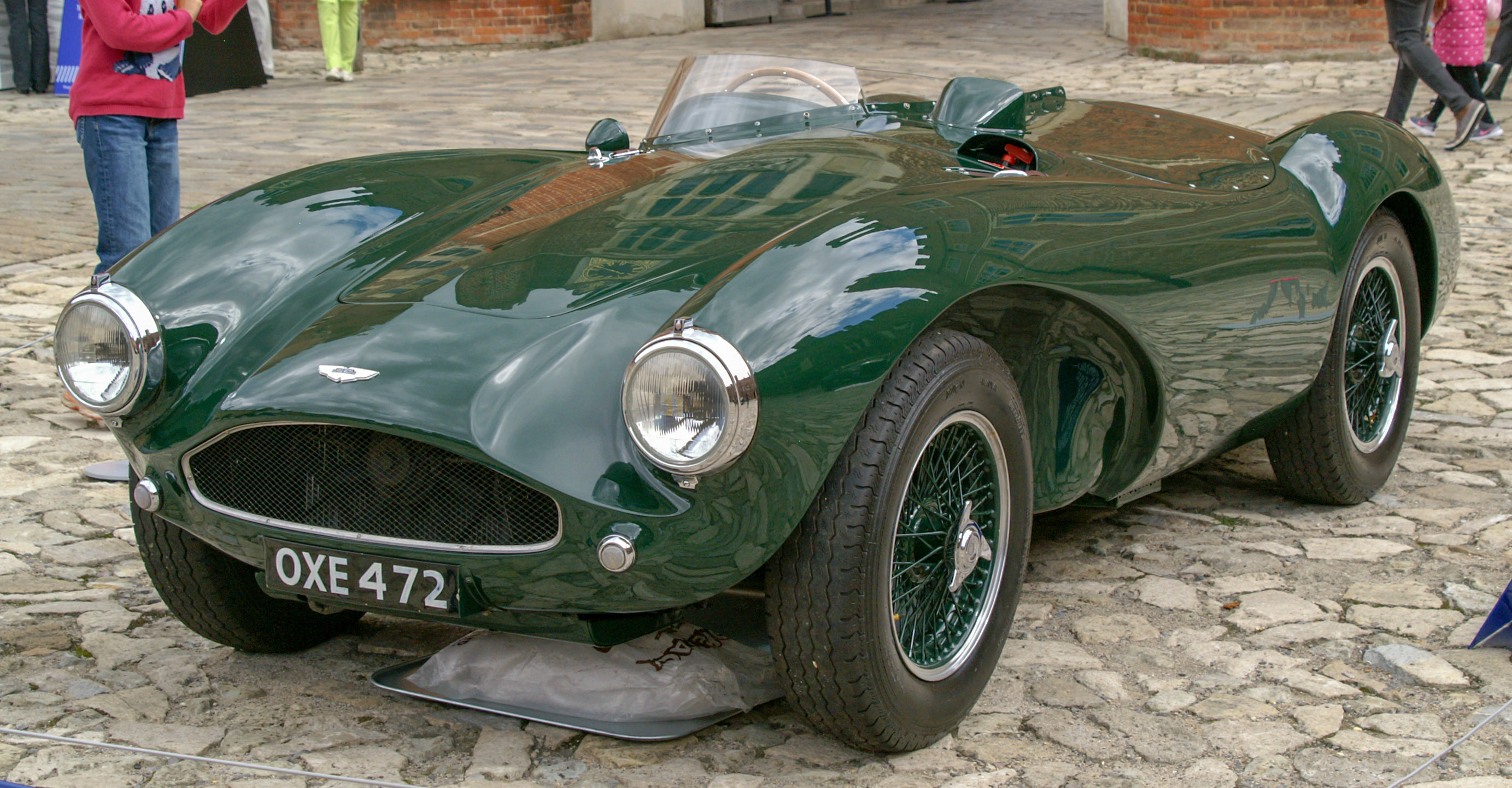
Ron Thorp placed fifth driving an Aston Martin DB3S similar to the pictured car.

Position	Driver	No.	Car	Entrant	Class pos.	Class	Laps
1	Ian Geoghegan	5	Lotus 23	Total Racing Team	1	1101 to 2000 cc	27
2	John Martin	111	Lola 1100	Martin's Neutral Bay Motors	1	Up to 1100cc	27
3	Les Howard	75	Lotus XI	Howard & Sons Racing Team	2	Up to 1100cc	27
4	Bill Gates	50	Elfin Clubman	GP Cars Racing Team	2	1101 to 2000 cc	26
5	Ron Thorp	39	Aston Martin DB3S	Ron Thorp's Bargain Barn	1	Over 2000 cc	26
6	Bill Weekes	33	Elfin	GP Cars Racing Team	3	Up to 1100cc	26
7	P. Underwood	48	Holden Special	P. Underwood	2	Over 2000 cc	25
8	Ann Thompson	21	Lotus XV Ford	Mrs A. Thompson	4	Up to 1100cc	23
9	Les Weiley	36	MGTC	Rawsthorne's Garage	3	1101 to 2000 cc	23
10	Adrian Yannuccelli	64	MGA	A. Yannuccelli	4	1101 to 2000 cc	23
11	C. Harding	58	Austin-Healey Sprite Mark 1				23
12	D. Casey	41	MGA				23
13	L. Austin	23	MGA				22
14	F. Brewer	53	Simca Special	G. Bernhagen			22
15	Brian Tebble	44	MGTD				22
16	P. Kinnane	46	Austin-Healey Sprite				22
17	G. Hawley	68	Austin-Healey Sprite Mark 1	Geary's Sports Cars			22
18	Ted Laker	101	Lotus Super 7				22
19	B. Saba	19	MGA	M. G. Car Club			21
20	K. Williams	65	Peugeot				21
21	Doug Bright	25	MGTC				21
22	B. Tapsall	45	Elford				15
DNF	John French	16	Turner	Alec Mildren		1100 to 2000 cc	23
DNF	J. York		Holden Special				22
DNF	Tony Basile	31	Porsche Carrera				21
DNF	Blair Salter	14	Elfin				18
DNF	Bev Fleming	10	Lotus XI				15
DNF	Tom Sulman	99	Lotus XV	T. N. Sulman		1100 to 2000 cc	11
DNF	K. Turner	?	Centaur				6
DNS	David Leighton	?	Triumph TR				-
DNS	Denis Geary	?	Centaur Repco Holden	Geary's Sports Cars			-
DNS	Greg Cusack	7	Elfin Mallala	Scuderia Veloce		1100 to 2000 cc	-

== Race statistics ==
- Race distance: 27 laps – 80 miles
- Number of starters: 29
- Number of finishers: 22
- Winner's race time: 55 minutes 23.0 seconds
- Fastest lap: 1 minute 57.5 seconds, Ian Geoghegan, (Lotus 23)
