= 1969 Australian Touring Car Championship =

Motor racing competition

Seasons
- ← 1968 1970 →

The 1969 Australian Touring Car Championship was a CAMS-sanctioned Australian motor racing title open to Group C Improved Production Touring Cars and Group E Series Production Touring Cars. The championship, which began at Calder Raceway on 23 March and ended at Symmons Plains Raceway on 16 November, was contested over a five heat series. It was the tenth running of the Australian Touring Car Championship and the first to be contested over a series of heats rather than as a single race.

The championship was won by Ian Geoghegan driving a Ford Mustang. It was Geoghegan's fifth and final Australian Touring Car Championship victory, creating a record that would not be equalled until 1989. It was also his fourth consecutive title, a feat which would not be achieved again until 2014. Alan Hamilton actually scored the most points across the five races, but drivers were required to drop their worst result which left Geoghegan as champion by a single point. A similar scenario would play out in 1991 with Jim Richards and Mark Skaife.

== Drivers ==
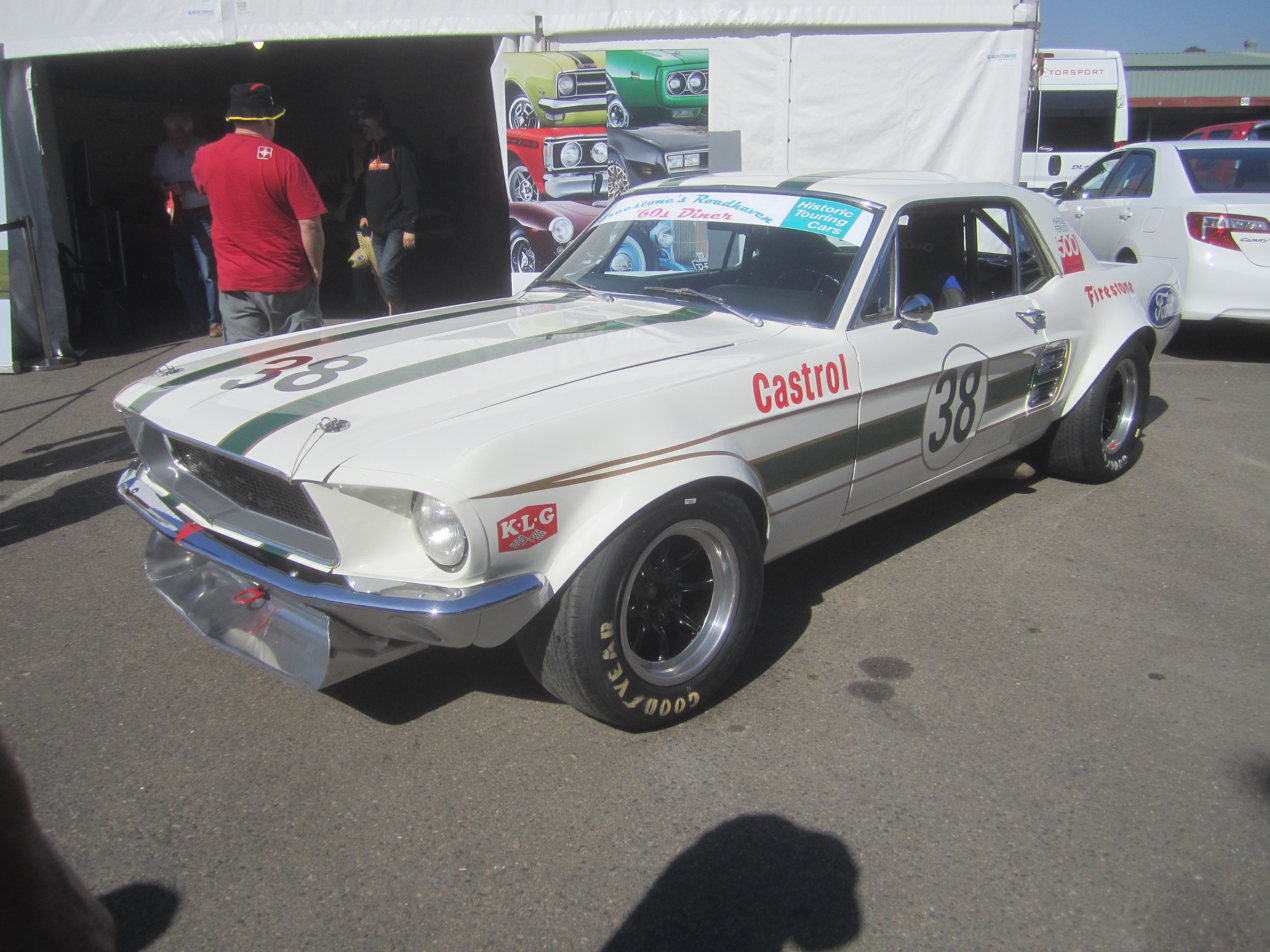
The Ford Mustang with which Ian Geoghegan won the championship. The car is pictured in 2013.

The following drivers competed in the 1969 championship. The list is not exhaustive.

Entrant	Car	No.	Driver
Mustang Team	Ford Mustang	1	(Australia) Ian Geoghegan
Peter Manton Racing	Morris Cooper S	2	(Australia) Peter Manton
Jim McKeown Motors	Ford Cortina Mark II Lotus	3	(Australia) Jim McKeown
Norm Beechey	Holden HK Monaro GTS327	4	(Australia) Norm Beechey
Terry Allan	Chevrolet Camaro	5	(Australia) Terry Allan
Bob Jane Racing Team	Ford Mustang	6; 7	(Australia) Bob Jane
Bob Jane Racing Team	Ford Mustang	6	(Australia) John Harvey
Graham Ryan	Holden EH	7	Graham Ryan
Porsche Distributors Racing	Porsche 911	9; 19; 88	(Australia) Alan Hamilton
Allan Moffat Racing	Ford Boss 302 Mustang	9	(Canada) Allan Moffat
Phil Barnes Motor Service	Morris Cooper S	11	(Australia) Phil Barnes
B.Hodgson	Ford XR Falcon GT	14	(Australia) B.Hodgson
Indianapolis Speed Shop	Chevrolet Chevy II Nova	15	(Australia) John Kay
Bryan Thomson Racing	Chevrolet Camaro	19	(Australia) Bryan Thomson
Brian Foley Motors P/L	Morris Cooper S Mk. II	28	(Australia) Brian Foley
R. Inglis	Ford Cortina Lotus	29	(Australia) Bob Inglis
C.G. Nancarrow	Morris Cooper S	30	(Australia) Cyril Nancarrow
Auto Transmission Services	Holden HR	33	(Australia) D.Wignall
M.E. Nancarrow	Ford Cortina Lotus	33	(Australia) Malcolm Nancarrow
A.M.I. Racing Team	Toyota Corolla	37	(Australia) Bob Morris
Ron Brownrigg Racing Team	Morris Cooper S	41	(Australia) Ron Brownrigg
MTR Services	Holden HK Monaro GTS327	44	(Australia) Nick Petrilli
Alec Mildren Racing	Alfa Romeo GTA	49	(Australia) John French
G. Bishop	Morris Cooper S	57	(Australia) Graeme Bishop
Brownrigg Racing Team	Ford Escort Mark I Twin Cam	58	(Australia) Allan Whiteley
Malcolm Motors	Morris Cooper S	59	(Australia) Ron Gillard
Ross Ambrose BMC	Morris Cooper S	78	(Australia) Ross Ambrose
M.Savva	Ford XT Falcon GT	85	(Australia) Mike Savva
Bessant Motors	Morris Cooper S	90	(Australia) Robin Bessant
Tony Calvert	Ford Cortina Lotus	94	(Australia) Tony Calvert
	Ford Mustang		(Australia) Robin Pare
British Leyland	Morris Cooper S		(Australia) J. Smith
AMI Racing Team	Toyota Corolla		(Australia) R Thurston
P. Cloak	Ford Cortina Lotus		(Australia) G. Wigston

== Calendar ==
The championship was contested over a series of five heats.

Heat	Heat name	Circuit	Location	Date	Winner	Car	Entrant
1	Calder	Calder Raceway	Melbourne, Victoria	23 March	Bob Jane	Ford Mustang	Bob Jane Racing Team
2	Bathurst	Mount Panorama Circuit	Bathurst, New South Wales	7 April	Ian Geoghegan	Ford Mustang	Mustang Team
3	(South Australia) South Australian Touring Car Championship	Mallala Race Circuit	Mallala, South Australia	16 June	Ian Geoghegan	Ford Mustang	Mustang Team
4	Queensland Touring Car Championship	Surfers Paradise Motor Racing Circuit	Surfers Paradise, Queensland	31 August	Norm Beechey	Holden HK Monaro GTS327	Norm Beechey
5	Tasmanian Touring Car Championship	Symmons Plains Raceway	Launceston, Tasmania	16 November	Norm Beechey	Holden HK Monaro GTS327	Norm Beechey

== Race summaries ==
=== Calder ===
Ian Geoghegan qualified on pole position with a record time of 48.3 seconds. Bob Jane was second ahead of Norm Beechey and Alan Hamilton. After blowing an engine, Beechey and his crew faced an overnight rebuild in order to make the grid. Beechey's car was repaired in time for the race and he took the lead off the start, only for Geoghegan to move past at the first corner. After a slow start, Jane passed Beechey on lap 4 and then overtook Geoghegan for the lead on lap 5. Beechey suffered another engine failure on lap 7. After conceding a five-second lead to Jane in the first two-thirds of the race, Geoghegan began closing the gap towards the end of the race. Both drivers set a new lap record of 49.1 seconds before Geoghegan made a move for the lead at the end of the straight. The Mustang's brakes faded however and Geoghegan ran wide, allowing Jane to take the win by five seconds. Hamilton finished third, one lap down on the leading pair.

=== Bathurst ===
Ian Geoghegan dominated the second round of the championship at Mount Panorama. After qualifying on pole position by over five seconds, he proceeded to build his lead by over ten seconds per lap during the race, winning by a lap over the Porsche of Alan Hamilton. Phil Barnes, driving a Morris Cooper S, finished in third place. Bob Jane had qualified second but blew an engine on lap 9, while Norm Beechey did not even start the race after an accident in practice. Hamilton did not have a smooth run, either, damaging his car's suspension in practice and having it repaired at a local workshop.

Ron Gillard, in a Cooper S, and Bob Morris, in a Corolla, battled during the early phases of the race before the Corolla's clutch failed. Morris stopped at the top of the circuit, planning to coast down to the finish on the final lap. However, the car stopped fifty yards short of the finish line and Morris had to push it to the finish. With Jane's retirement, Geoghegan took the lead in the points standings while Hamilton moved up to second place.

=== Mallala ===
Bob Jane took pole position for the Mallala round ahead of Ian Geoghegan and Allan Moffat. Norm Beechey again did not start after blowing an engine in a preliminary race. Geoghegan was left with an easy victory after Moffat retired on lap 2 and Jane retired at the halfway mark. Alan Hamilton finished second, 44 seconds behind Geoghegan, with Peter Manton in third. Only seven of the fifteen starters finished the race. Geoghegan assumed an eight-point lead in the championship over Hamilton, with Jane maintaining third place courtesy of his victory at Calder.

=== Surfers Paradise ===
Ian Geoghegan took his third pole position of the season ahead of Norm Beechey, whose time was equalled by Alan Hamilton. Geoghegan moved into the lead at the start of the race and pulled away from Beechey, before hitting a dropped exhaust pipe on lap 8. This punctured a rear tyre and the resulting pit stop left Geoghegan two laps down on Beechey.

Despite being up to four seconds a lap faster than Beechey, the race was not long enough for him to reach higher than sixth place. Beechey took his first win of the season, and the first championship race victory for Holden, with Hamilton again finishing in second place. Jim McKeown finished third. Geoghegan's troubles saw his championship lead drop to just three points over Hamilton, meaning that the title would be decided at the final round at Symmons Plains. Peter Manton moved into third place in the points standings after Jane did not take part in the race.

=== Symmons Plains ===
Ian Geoghegan led Alan Hamilton by three points coming into the final round. However, due to each driver being required to drop their worst result from the five rounds, Hamilton had to win with Geoghegan failing to score in order to take the title, as he would drop his four points for third place at Calder. Geoghegan took pole position ahead of John Harvey, driving Bob Jane's Mustang. Harvey was followed by Allan Moffat, Norm Beechey and Hamilton. Geoghegan's car failed to start at the one-minute signal and the race began while he was still in the pits. His pit crew eventually push started the car but this meant that Geoghegan would be disqualified. With Geoghegan out of the running, Hamilton just required a win to take the title. Harvey took the lead at the start ahead of Moffat and Beechey. Moffat's engine failed on lap 7, elevating Beechey and Hamilton into second and third respectively. Harvey led the race by ten seconds, with Hamilton fourteen seconds off the lead.

Tyre punctures for Harvey on laps 15 and 16 forced him out of contention, leaving Beechey in the lead and Hamilton in second. Beechey extended his lead until transmission problems saw him unable to use the lower gears. As a result, he had to slip the clutch to keep the car accelerating at low speed. Hamilton closed the gap, getting to within a car length of Beechey going into the final corner. Beechey was able to accelerate away from the Porsche on the run to the finish to take the win over Hamilton and Jim McKeown. Despite the looming disqualification, Geoghegan continued on in the race, breaking the lap record and eventually making it back on to the lead lap. With Hamilton failing to take victory, Geoghegan clinched the title by one point. Beechey's consecutive wins in the final two rounds saw him take third place in the points standings ahead of McKeown and Peter Manton.

== Points system ==
Points were awarded as follows to the top six finishers in each heat. Drivers were required to drop their worst score from the five heats.

Position	1st	2nd	3rd	4th	5th	6th
Points	9	6	4	3	2	1

== Championship standings ==
Results in parentheses are those not counted in the final points score. Points totals without parentheses are championship points; those in parentheses are total points scored.

Pos.	Driver	Car	Cal (Victoria (state))	Bat (New South Wales)	Mal (South Australia)	Sur (Queensland)	Sym (Tasmania)	Pts.
1	Ian Geoghegan	Ford Mustang	**2**	**1**	1	**6**	**DSQ**	25
2	Alan Hamilton	Porsche 911	(3)	2	2	2	2	24 (28)
3	Norm Beechey	Holden HK Monaro GTS327	Ret	DNS	DNS	1	1	18
4	Jim McKeown	Ford Cortina Lotus Mark II			4	3	3	11
5	Peter Manton	Morris Cooper S	4		3	4		10
6	Bob Jane	Ford Mustang	1	Ret	**Ret**			9
7	Phil Barnes	Morris Cooper S	5	3				6
8	Bob Inglis	Ford Cortina Lotus		4				3
8	Robin Bessant	Morris Cooper S					4	3
10	Ron Gillard	Morris Cooper S		5				2
10	Graeme Bishop	Morris Cooper S			5			2
10	John French	Alfa Romeo GTA				5		2
10	Ross Ambrose	Morris Cooper S					5	2
14	Ron Brownrigg	Morris Cooper S	6					1
14	Nick Petrilli	Holden HK Monaro GTS327		6				1
14	Malcolm Nancarrow	Ford Cortina Lotus			6			1
14	Tony Calvert	Ford Cortina Lotus					6	1
Pos.	Driver	Car	Cal (Victoria (state))	Bat (New South Wales)	Mal (South Australia)	Sur (Queensland)	Sym (Tasmania)	Pts.

Colour	Result
Gold	Winner
Silver	Second place
Bronze	Third place
Green	Points classification
Blue	Non-points classification
Blue	Non-classified finish (NC)
Purple	Retired, not classified (Ret)
Red	Did not qualify (DNQ)
Red	Did not pre-qualify (DNPQ)
Black	Disqualified (DSQ)
White	Did not start (DNS)
White	Withdrew (WD)
White	Race cancelled (C)
Blank	Did not practice (DNP)
Blank	Did not arrive (DNA)
Blank	Excluded (EX)

Bold - Pole position
