= 1977 Australian Tourist Trophy =

The 1977 Australian Tourist Trophy was a motor race staged at the Phillip Island circuit in Victoria, Australia on 13 November 1977. It was open to Group A Sports Cars and was recognized by the Confederation of Australian Motor Sport as an Australian Title. The race, which was the fifteenth Australian Tourist Trophy, was won by Ian Geoghegan of Sydney, driving the Porsche 935 of Laurie O’Neill. It was Geoghegan's third Australian Tourist Trophy victory.

== Results ==
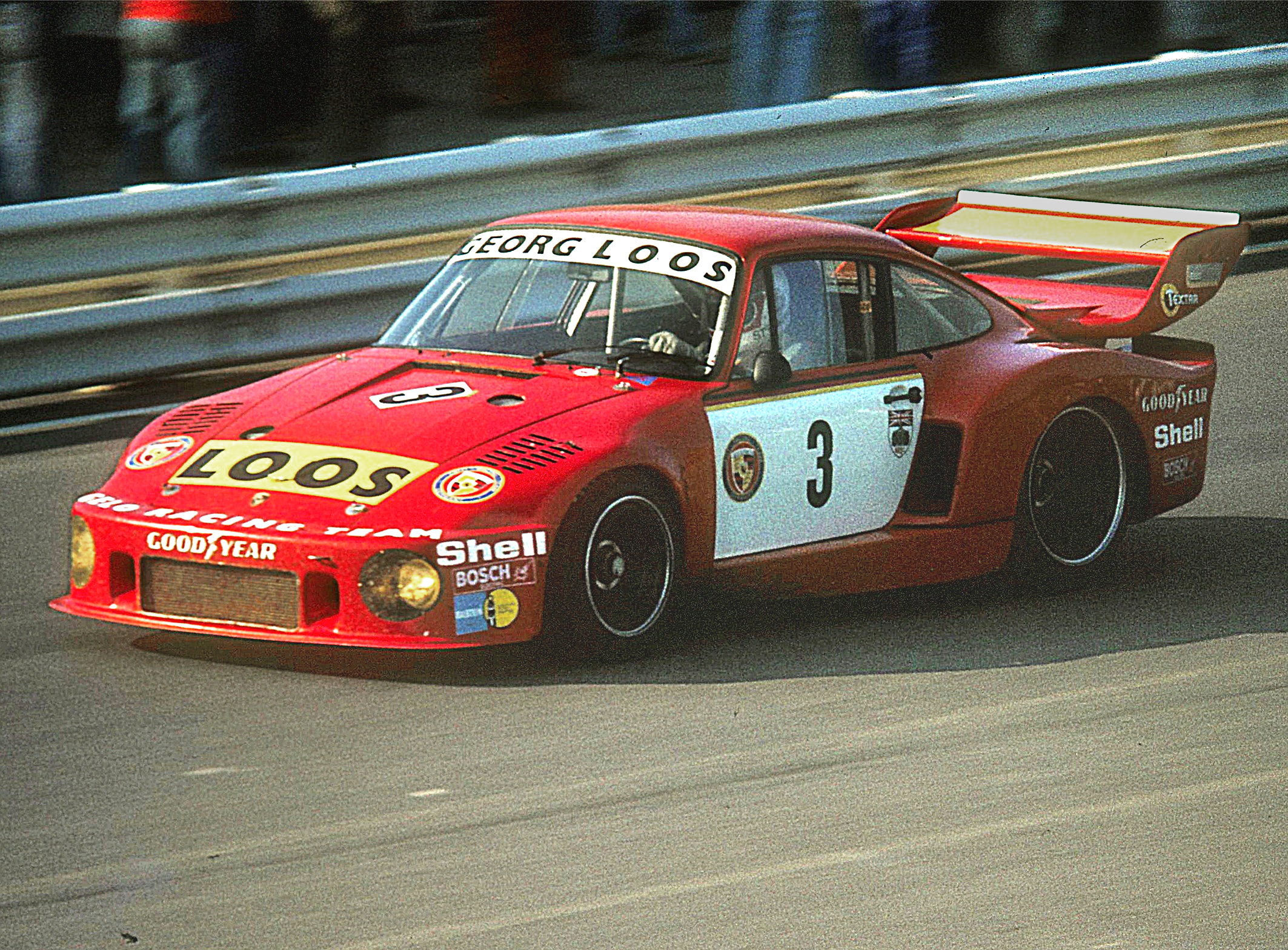
Ian Geoghegan won the 1977 Australian Tourist Trophy driving a Porsche 935, similar to the example pictured above

Position	Driver	Car
1	Ian Geoghegan	Porsche 935
2	David Richardson	Matich SR3A
3	Greg Doidge	Elfin 360
4	Peter Middleton	Boral
5	Derek Fry	Cheetah
6	Peter Jones	Cheetah

=== Race statistics ===
- Race distance: 20 laps, 60 miles, 96.54 km
- Race time : 37:27.1
