= 1966 Australian Touring Car Championship =

Motor racing competition

Seasons
- ← 1965 1967 →

Layout of the Mount Panorama Circuit (1938-1986)

The 1966 Australian Touring Car Championship was a CAMS sanctioned Australian motor racing title open to Group C Improved Production Touring Cars. It was contested over a single 20-lap race staged at the Mount Panorama Circuit near Bathurst in New South Wales, Australia on Easter Monday, 11 April 1966, and was the seventh running of the Australian Touring Car Championship. The race was sponsored by the Neptune Oil Company, Sydney.

Ian Geoghegan, driving a Ford Mustang, claimed his second Australian Touring Car Championship title and the first of four consecutive titles that he would achieve in Mustangs.

== Race summary ==
Ian Geoghegan had upgraded to a Ford Mustang and took pole position ahead of Norm Beechey, who had qualified both his Mustang and his new Chevrolet Chevy II Nova. Despite lapping quicker in the Mustang, Beechey elected to race the more powerful Chevy II Nova. Don Smith had qualified sixth in his Holden EH S4, but was unable to start due to an accident in a preliminary race.

Beechey led away from the start and gradually increased his lead during the first half of the 20-lap race, moving 9.6 seconds ahead of Geoghegan by the end of lap 8. Three cars had been retired at this point: T. McGee's Morris Cooper, Malcolm Bailey's Ford Zephyr and Bob Edgerton's Morris Cooper S.

Geoghegan started to reduce the gap on lap 9 and caught Beechey on lap 13 before passing him on lap 14. Terry Allan retired from the race on lap 13 while fellow Holden runner Warren Weldon retired on lap 16 with a broken crankshaft. Beechey's pace dropped off for the remainder of the race, with reported clutch troubles, allowing Geoghegan to take an easy victory. Kevin Bartlett, driving an Alfa Romeo GTA, was the only other driver to finish on the lead lap, albeit nearly two minutes behind Beechey. John Harvey and Phil Barnes completed the top five, one lap down on the leaders.

== Results ==
Pos.	Driver	No.	Car	Entrant	Class	Laps	Time/Remarks	Grid
1	(Australia) Ian Geoghegan	1	Ford Mustang	Total Team	Over 3000cc	20	54:30.2	1
2	(Australia) Norm Beechey^{1}	3	Chevrolet Chevy II Nova	Neptune Racing Team	Over 3000cc	20	+32.8	3
3	(Australia) Kevin Bartlett	12	Alfa Romeo GTA	Alec Mildren Racing Pty Ltd	1501–2000cc	20	+2:19.8	4
4	(Australia) John Harvey	76	Austin Cooper S	R.C. Phillips Sports Car World	1101–1500cc	19	+1 lap	5
5	(Australia) Phil Barnes	99	Morris Cooper S	Vaughan & Lane	1101–1500cc	19	+1 lap	8
6	(Australia) John French	15	Morris Cooper S	J. French	0–1100cc	18	+2 laps	10
7	(Australia) Bill Brown	71	Volvo 122S	Scuderia Veloce	1501–2000cc	18	+2 laps	13
8	(Australia) Bob Holden	13	Morris Cooper S	B.M.C. (Australia) Pty Ltd	1101–1500cc	17	+3 laps	17
9	(Australia) Don Holland	38	Morris Cooper S	Don Holland Motors	1101–1500cc	17	+3 laps	18
10	(Australia) A. Patterson	42	Ford Cortina Mark I GT	A.R. Patterson	1101–1500cc	17	+3 laps	22
11	(Australia) Peter Mander	75	Morris Cooper S	Marque Motors	1101–1500cc	17	+3 laps	19
12	(Australia) David Frazer	64	Renault R8 Gordini	Renno Motors	1101–1500cc	16	+4 laps	?
13	(Australia) John Hall	23	Holden X2	H. Taylor	2001–3000cc	16	+4 laps	24
14	(Australia) A. Barrow	82	Holden FJ	A. Barrow	2001–3000cc	16	+4 laps	28
15	(Australia) John Prisk	33	Morris Cooper	Varsity Auto Centre	0–1100cc	16	+4 laps	25
16	(Australia) Digby Cooke	84?	Morris Cooper	Marque Motors	0–1100cc	16	+4 laps	?
17	(Australia) M. Schneider	54	Morris Mini Deluxe	Marque Motors	0–1100cc	16	+4 laps	?
18	(Australia) Ross Edgerton	43	Renault R8	Ross Edgerton	0–1100cc	13	+7 laps	23
19	(Australia) G. MacDonald	45	Ford Cortina Mark I GT	Esso Servicenter	1101–1500cc	7	+13 laps	?
Ret	(Australia) Charlie Smith	100	Morris Cooper S	C.G. Smith	1101–1500cc	17		12
Ret	(Australia) Bill Stanley	84?	Morris Cooper	Marque Motors	0–1100cc	16		27
Ret	(Australia) Warren Weldon	119	Holden EH Special S4	Waggott Engineering	2001–3000cc	15	Crankshaft	7
Ret	(Australia) Bruce Wright	28	Morris Cooper S	Peter Owen Racing	1101–1500cc	14		15
Ret	(Australia) R. Lindsay	32	Renault R8 Gordini	R. Lindsay	1101–1500cc	13		26
Ret	(Australia) Terry Allan	2	Holden EH Special S4	Syndal Motors	2001–3000cc	12	Clutch failure	9
Ret	(Australia) Bob Edgerton	66	Morris Cooper S	Robert Edgerton	0–1100cc	7		?
Ret	(Australia) Malcolm Bailey	53	Ford Zephyr	M. Bailey	2001–3000cc	5		?
Ret	(Australia) T. McGee	11	Morris Cooper	Esso Servicentre (Waterloo)	0–1100cc	4		?
DNS	(Australia) Norm Beechey^{1}	2	Ford Mustang	Neptune Racing Team	Over 3000cc	-	Withdrew	(2)
DNS	(Australia) Don Smith	55	Holden EH Special S4	Smith Auto Accessories	2001–3000cc	-	Accident in preliminary race	(6)
DNS	(Australia) Alton Boddenberg	105	Chrysler Valiant	Advanx (Gosford) Motor Service	Over 3000cc	-	Clutch problems in preliminary race	(11)

Notes:

- Class winners are indicated by bold text.
- ^1 Norm Beechey qualified in both his Ford Mustang and his Chevrolet Chevy II Nova but chose to race the latter.

== Statistics ==
- Attendance: 20,000
- Pole position: Ian Geoghegan, 2:40.7
- Fastest lap: Ian Geoghegan, 2:40.4 (New record)
- Race distance: 20 laps, 123.44 km
- Winner's average speed: 135.89 km/h
