= Supercars Hall of Fame =

- Description: Recognizing champions and prominent figures in Australian Supercars
- Country: Australia
- Presented by: Supercars Championship
- Website: www.supercars.com

The Supercars Hall of Fame is a collection of individuals and events that recognise the efforts of past champions and prominent figures within the Supercars Championship in Australia.

A new inductee is announced annually at the championship's end of season gala dinner in November.

== History ==
The Hall of Fame was instituted in 1999 with the first running of what was then known as the V8 Supercars Championship Series, initially known as the Shell Championship Series. The initial inductees were five-time Australian Touring Car Champion Ian Geoghegan and four-time champion Allan Moffat. Until 2011, all of the drivers inducted have been either Australian Touring Car champions or multiple winners of the Bathurst 1000 race. Two former drivers were inducted in each of 1999 to 2002 and in 2004, while 2003 and 2010 saw no inductees added. 2005 saw the controversial inclusion of an event instead of a driver, in the Adelaide 500, the traditional season opening event. The first individual who had not driven in the series to be added to the hall of fame was Tony Cochrane, the former chairman of the sport from 1997 until 2012.

== Inductees ==
Year	Inductees
1999	Ian Geoghegan; Allan Moffat
2000	Norm Beechey; Bob Jane
2001	Peter Brock; Dick Johnson
2002	Colin Bond
2003	No inductees
2004	Fred Gibson; Bob Morris
2005	Adelaide 500
2006	Jim Richards
2007	Harry Firth
2008	Larry Perkins
2009	John Bowe
2010	No inductees
2011	Glenn Seton
2012	Tony Cochrane
2013	Jason Richards
2014	Mark Skaife
2015	Garry Rogers
2016	Ross & Jimmy Stone
2017	Neil Crompton
2018	Tom Walkinshaw
2019–2020	No inductees
2021	Jamie Whincup
2022	Craig Lowndes; Tim Schenken
2023	No inductees
2024	Wayne Cattach
2025	Marcos Ambrose
