= 1967 Australian Touring Car Championship =

Motor racing competition

Seasons
- ← 1966 1968 →

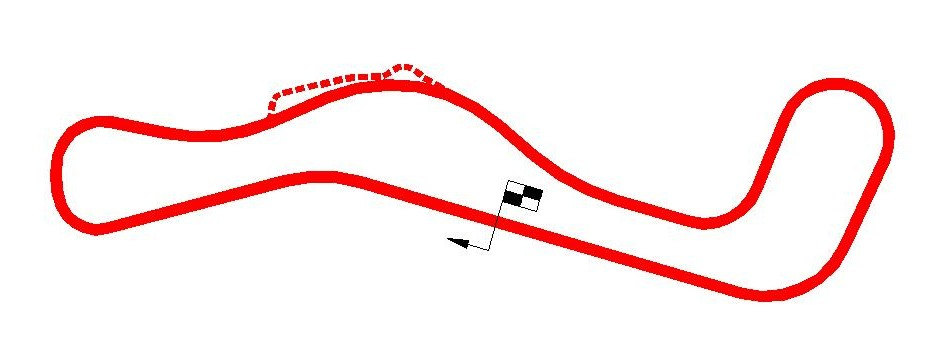
Layout of the Lakeside International Raceway

The 1967 Australian Touring Car Championship was a CAMS sanctioned national motor racing title open to Group C Improved Production Touring Cars. It was contested over a single race, staged at the Lakeside Circuit in Queensland, Australia on 30 July 1967. The title, which was the eighth Australian Touring Car Championship, was won by Ian Geoghegan, driving a Ford Mustang.

== Report ==
Grid positions for the championship were determined by the fastest lap times from preliminary heats, with Heat 1 being for cars up to 1500cc capacity and Heat 2 for the larger engined cars. Norm Beechey started his Chevrolet Chevy II Nova on pole position in the final, with Ian Geoghegan second in his new Ford Mustang, which had only arrived at the circuit on the morning of the race. Greg Cusack started third in another Mustang ahead of the Morris Cooper Ss of Brian Foley and Peter Manton.

Beechey took the lead at the start of the race ahead of Geoghegan, with Jim McKeown moving into third from sixth place on the grid. Bob Jane's Mustang became jammed in top gear on lap 2, forcing him to retire. Beechey set a new lap record of 1:04.3 as he continued to build his lead, despite a minor clutch problem which meant that he had to make clutchless shifts.

By lap 35, Terry Allan and Paul Fahey had both retired and Foley had moved into third place, with Manton running five seconds behind. The complexion of the race changed on lap 40, when the left-rear tyre of Beechey's car blew and caused him to hit the fence. Geoghegan inherited the lead and held it for the final ten laps to secure his third Australian Touring Car Championship title. Foley and Manton finished in second and third, less than twenty seconds behind Geoghegan.

== Results ==
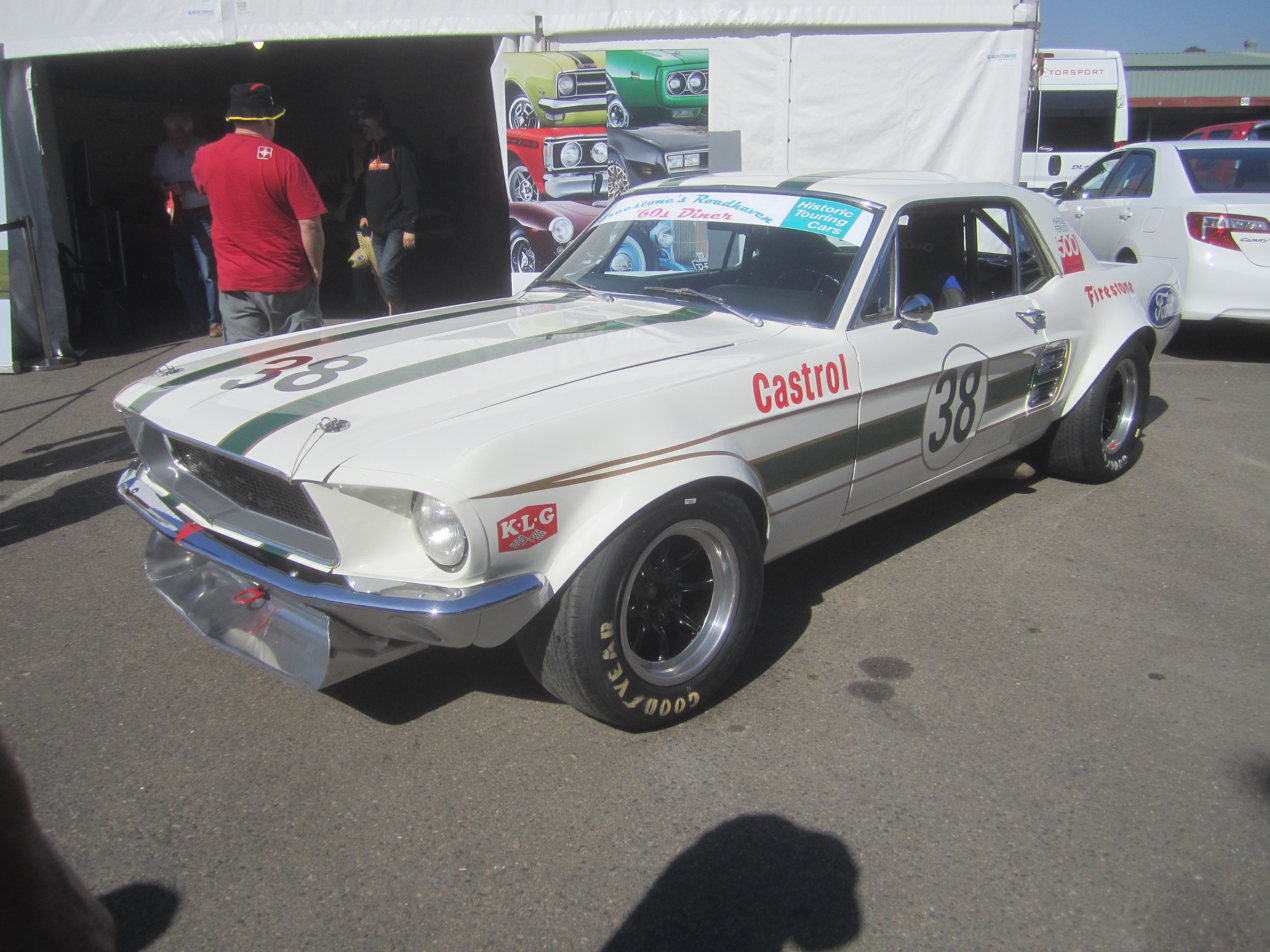
Ian Geoghegan won the championship driving this Ford Mustang. The car is pictured in 2013 in different specification.

Class winners are indicated by bold text.

Pos.	Driver	No.	Car	Entrant	Class	Laps	Time/Retired
1	(Australia) Ian Geoghegan	1	Ford Mustang	Mustang Team	Over 3000cc	50	54:43.4
2	(Australia) Brian Foley	8	Morris Cooper S	Brian Foley Motors	1101–1500cc	50	+12.0
3	(Australia) Peter Manton	2	Morris Cooper S	Tridents Racing Team	1101–1500cc	50	+16.4
4	(Australia) Kevin Bartlett	5	Alfa Romeo GTA	Mildren Racing Team	1501–2000cc	50	+52.7
5	(Australia) Greg Cusack	7	Ford Mustang	Mustang Team	Over 3000cc	49	+1 lap
6	(Australia) Jim McKeown	3	Ford Cortina Mark I Lotus	Tridents Racing Team	1501–2000cc	49	+1 lap
7	(New Zealand) Rod Coppins	10	Ford Mustang	R. Coppins	Over 3000cc	47	+3 laps
8	(Australia) John French	26	Morris Cooper S	J. French	0–1100cc	47	+3 laps
9	(Australia) John Humphrey	85	Austin Cooper S		0–1100cc	47	+3 laps
10	(Australia) John Rout	35	Morris Cooper S		1101–1500cc	46	+4 laps
11	(Australia) Gordon Clough	58	Holden EH		2001–3000cc	43	+7 laps
12	(Australia) Mike McGregor	74	Morris Cooper S			43	+7 laps
Ret	(Australia) Laurie Stewart	52	Morris Cooper S		0–1100cc	45	
Ret	(Australia) Norm Beechey	34	Chevrolet Chevy II Nova	Tridents Racing Team	Over 3000cc	39	Accident
Ret	(New Zealand) Paul Fahey	11	Ford Mustang		Over 3000cc	31	Fuel pump
Ret	(Australia) Brian Michelmore	56	Ford Cortina Mark I Lotus		1501–2000cc	28	Gearbox
Ret	(Australia) Evan Thomas	48	Holden EH		2001–3000cc	20	
Ret	(Australia) Terry Allan	19	Chevrolet Camaro		Over 3000cc	17	
Ret	(Australia) John Reilly	80	Holden EH		2001–3000cc	5	
Ret	(Australia) Bob Jane	6	Ford Mustang		Over 3000cc	2	Gearbox

== Statistics ==
- Attendance: 14,000
- Pole position: Norm Beechey, 1:03.4
- Fastest lap: Norm Beechey, 1:03.3 (137.29 km/h, 85.3 mph) - New record
- Race distance: 50 laps, 120.70 km
- Average speed of winning car: 132.34 km/h 82.31 mph
