= Norm Beechey =

Australian racing driver

- Nationality: Australian
- Born: Norman Edward Beechey; 9 July 1932 (age 94)

Australian Touring Car Championship
- Years active: 1963–1972
- Teams: Scuderia Veloce; Neptune Racing Team; Trident Racing; Shell Racing Team
- Starts: 25
- Wins: 7
- Best finish: 1st in 1965 & 1970

Championship titles
- 1965 1970: Australian Touring Car Championship; Australian Touring Car Championship

Awards
- 2000: V8 Supercars Hall of Fame

Norman Edward Beechey (born 9 July 1932) is a retired Australian race car driver, who was given the nickname "Stormin Norman" by his fans. To some, he was the closest thing Holden had to a star racing driver, before Peter Brock. Beechey competed in the Australian Touring Car Championship from 1963 to 1972 winning the title in 1965 driving a Ford Mustang and in 1970 at the wheel of a Holden Monaro. Along the way, he achieved seven round wins, and one pole position. His championship win in 1970 was the first victory by a Holden driver in the Australian Touring Car Championship.

== Career ==
Beechey began racing at the age of 22 in a Ford Customline V8. He came to prominence only a year later when he won the Olympic Touring Car Race at Albert Park, a support event at the Australian Grand Prix meeting which was held in conjunction with the 1956 Melbourne Olympic Games. As the expense of running this and two subsequent Customline V8s proved too prohibitive he reverted to a Holden 48-215 in 1959. After becoming part of David McKay’s Scuderia Veloce team he again returned to V8s, developing a Chevrolet Impala with which he won the New South Wales Touring Car Championship at Catalina Park. He progressed to a Ford Galaxie owned by Len Lukey and was then instrumental in forming the Neptune Racing Team in 1964. He raced a Holden EH S4 as part of that team alongside Jim McKeown’s Lotus Cortina and Peter Manton’s Morris Cooper S. He subsequently developed and raced a series of V8 powered Touring Cars with which he contested the Australian Touring Car Championship and other events. The first Ford Mustang to race in Australia was followed by a Chevrolet Chevy II Nova, a Chevrolet Camaro, a Holden Monaro GTS 327 and a Holden Monaro GTS 350.

Beechey retired from racing at the end of the 1972 season. He was inducted into the V8 Supercars Hall of Fame in 2000.

== Career results ==
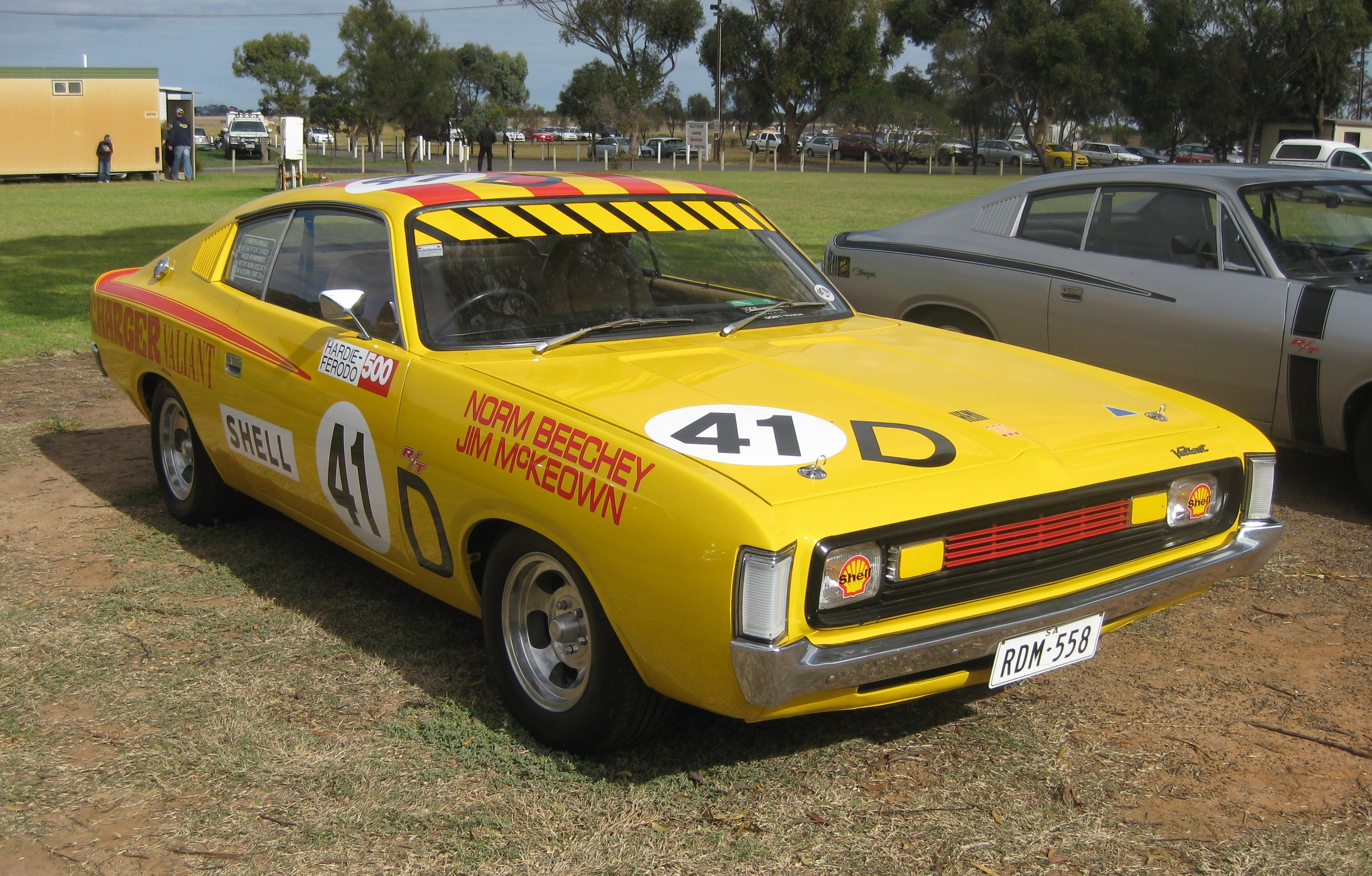
A recreation of the Chrysler VH Valiant Charger R/T E38 which was driven to 6th place in Class D of the 1971 Hardie-Ferodo 500 by Norm Beechey & Jim McKeown

Season	Title	Position	Car	Team
1964	Australian Touring Car Championship	**2nd**	Holden EH Special S4	Neptune Racing Team
1965	Australian Touring Car Championship	**1st**	Ford Mustang	Neptune Racing Team
1966	Australian Touring Car Championship	**2nd**	Chevrolet Chevy II Nova	Neptune Racing Team
1969	Australian Touring Car Championship	**3rd**	Holden HK Monaro GTS327	Norm Beechey
1970	Australian Touring Car Championship	**1st**	Holden HT Monaro GTS350	Norm Beechey Shell Race Team
1971	Australian Touring Car Championship	5th	Holden HT Monaro GTS350	Shell Racing
1972	Australian Touring Car Championship	13th	Holden HT Monaro GTS350	Shell Racing

=== Complete Australian Touring Car Championship results ===
(key) (Races in bold indicate pole position) (Races in italics indicate fastest lap)

Year	Team	Car	1	2	3	4	5	6	7	8	DC	Points
1963		Holden 48-215	MAL; Ret								NC	-
1964	Neptune Racing Team	Holden EH Special S4	LAK; 2								2nd	-
1965	Neptune Racing Team	Ford Mustang	SAN; 1								1st	-
1966	Neptune Racing Team	Chevrolet Chevy II Nova	BAT; 2								2nd	-
1967	Tridents Racing Team	Chevrolet Chevy II Nova	LAK; Ret								NC	-
1968	Norm Beechey	Chevrolet Camaro SS	WAR; Ret								NC	-
1969	Norm Beechey	Holden HK Monaro GTS327	CAL; Ret	BAT; DNS	MAL; DNS	SUR; 1	SYM; 1				3rd	18
1970	Norm Beechey Shell Race Team	Holden HT Monaro GTS350	CAL; 8	BAT; 1	SAN; 1	MAL; 2	WAR; Ret	LAK; 1	SYM; DNS		1st	33
1971	Shell Racing	Holden HT Monaro GTS350	SYM; Ret	CAL; 1	SAN; Ret	SUR; Ret	MAL; Ret	LAK; 4	ORA; Ret		5th	12
1972	Shell Racing	Holden HT Monaro GTS350	SYM; Ret	CAL; Ret	BAT; Ret	SAN; 3	AIR; DNS	WAR	SUR; DNS	ORA	13th	6

=== Complete Phillip Island/Bathurst 500 results ===
Year	Team	Co-driver	Car	Class	Laps	Overall position	Class position
1960	(Australia) Australian Motor Industries	(Australia) John French	Standard Vanguard	D	162	5th	**2nd**
1961	(Australia) W McB March	(Australia) Bill March	Renault Gordini	D	156	10th	**2nd**
1962	(Australia) Continental and General Distributors	(Australia) Greg Cusack	Citroën ID19	A	160	11th	**3rd**
1970	(Australia) N Beechey	(Australia) Bruce Hindhaugh	Chrysler VG Valiant Pacer 4 Barrell	D	39	DNF	DNF
1971	(Australia) Shell Racing	(Australia) Jim McKeown	Chrysler VH Valiant Charger R/T E38	D	127	12th	6th

Sporting positions
Preceded by Ian Geoghegan	Winner of the Australian Touring Car Championship; 1965	Succeeded by Ian Geoghegan
Preceded by Ian Geoghegan	Winner of the Australian Touring Car Championship; 1970	Succeeded by Bob Jane
