= Ian Geoghegan =

Australian racing driver

- Nationality: Australian
- Born: Ian Anthony Geoghegan; 26 April 1939 Sydney, New South Wales, Australia
- Died: 15 November 2003 (aged 64) Sydney, New South Wales, Australia
- Relatives: Tom Geoghegan (father); Leo Geoghegan (brother); Max Geoghegan (grandson)

Australian Touring Car Championship
- Years active: 1961–73 & 1978
- Teams: Geoghegan's Sporty Cars; Total Team
- Wins: 9
- Best finish: 1st in 1964, 1966, 1967, 1968 & 1969

Previous series
- 1960 1976 1976: Australian GT Championship; Australian Sports Car Champ. Australian Sports Sedan Champ.

Championship titles
- 1962 1963 1964 1965 1966 1967 1968 1969 1973 1976 1977: Bathurst 6 Hour; Australian Tourist Trophy; Australian Touring Car Champ. Australian Tourist Trophy; Australian Touring Car Champ. Australian Touring Car Champ. Australian Touring Car Champ. Australian Touring Car Champ. Bathurst 1000; Australian Sports Car Champ. Australian Tourist Trophy

Awards
- 1999: V8 Supercars Hall of Fame

Ian Anthony "Pete" Geoghegan, (26 April 1939 – 15 November 2003) was an Australian race car driver, known for a quick wit and natural driving skills. Sometimes referred to as "Pete" Geoghegan, he was one of the iconic characters of the 1960s and 1970s Australian motor racing scene. His older brother Leo was also an accomplished driver and the brothers often shared a car in endurance events.

Geoghegan was a five-time winner of the Australian Touring Car Championship, a feat matched by only three other drivers since (Dick Johnson, Mark Skaife and Jamie Whincup). He achieved this string of victories driving against competitors of the highest calibre, such as Bob Jane, Norm Beechey and Allan Moffat. He also won the prestigious Bathurst 1000 endurance race in 1973, driving an XA Falcon GT with Moffat for the Ford Works Team.

Later in his career, Geoghegan drove a Porsche Carrera to win the 1976 Australian Sports Car Championship, while also driving a Holden HQ Monaro in the Australian Sports Sedan Championship. Geoghegan was inducted into the V8 Supercars Hall of Fame in 1999.

== Career results ==
The following table lists the results obtained by Ian Geoghegan in the various national motor racing titles and major endurance races in which he competed.

Year	Title/ event	Position	Car	Entrant
1960	Australian GT Championship	**3rd**	Holden	Geoghegan Motors
1961	Australian Touring Car Championship	**2nd**	Jaguar 3.4 Litre	Geoghegan Motors Liverpool
1963	Australian Tourist Trophy	**1st**	Lotus 23	Total Racing Team
1964	Australian Touring Car Championship	**1st**	Ford Cortina GT	Total Team
1965	Australian Touring Car Championship	**2nd**	Ford Cortina Lotus	Total Team
1965	Australian Tourist Trophy	**1st**	Lotus 23	Total Team
1966	Australian Touring Car Championship	**1st**	Ford Mustang	Total Team
1967	Australian Touring Car Championship	**1st**	Ford Mustang	Mustang Team
1968	Australian Touring Car Championship	**1st**	Ford Mustang	Mustang Team
1969	Australian Touring Car Championship	**1st**	Ford Mustang	Mustang Team
1970	Australian Touring Car Championship	4th	Ford Mustang	Geoghegan's Sporty Cars
1971	Australian Touring Car Championship	**3rd**	Ford Mustang	Geoghegan's Sporty Cars
1972	Australian Touring Car Championship	4th	Ford XY Falcon GTHO Phase III	Geoghegan's Sporty Cars
1973	Australian Touring Car Championship	8th	Chrysler VH Valiant Charger R/T E49	Grace Brothers Racing
1974	Toby Lee Series	8th	Porsche 911	
1976	Australian Sports Car Championship	**1st**	Porsche Carrera	Laurex Pty Ltd
1976	Australian Sports Sedan Championship	6th	Holden HQ Monaro	Craven Mild Racing
1977	Australian Tourist Trophy	**1st**	Porsche 935	
1978	Australian Touring Car Championship	13th	Holden LX Torana SS A9X Hatchback	Bob Jane T-Marts

=== Complete Australian Touring Car Championship results ===
(key) (Races in bold indicate pole position) (Races in italics indicate fastest lap)

Year	Team	Car	1	2	3	4	5	6	7	8	DC	Points
1961	Geoghegan Motors Liverpool	Jaguar Mk.I 3.4	LOW; 2								2nd	-
1964	Total Team	Ford Cortina Mk.I GT	LAK; 1								1st	-
1965	Total Team	Ford Cortina Mk.I GT	SAN; 2								2nd	-
1966	Total Team	Ford Mustang	BAT; 1								1st	-
1967	Mustang Team	Ford Mustang	LAK; 1								1st	-
1968	Mustang Team	Ford Mustang	WAR; 1								1st	-
1969	Mustang Team	Ford Mustang	CAL; 2	BAT; 1	MAL; 1	SUR; 6	SYM; DSQ				1st	25
1970	Geoghegan's Sporty Cars	Ford Mustang	CAL; Ret	BAT; 2	SAN; 2	MAL; 1	WAR; Ret	LAK; Ret	SYM		4th	21
1971	Geoghegan's Sporty Cars	Ford Mustang	SYM; 3	CAL; 2	SAN; 2	SUR; 3	MAL; 2	LAK; 2	ORA; 3		3rd	36
1972	Geoghegan's Sporty Cars	Ford XY Falcon GTHO Phase III	SYM; Ret	CAL; 3	BAT; 1	SAN; Ret	AIR; 2	WAR; DNS	SUR; Ret	ORA; 2	4th	37
1973	Grace Brothers Racing	Chrysler VH Valiant Charger R/T E49	SYM	CAL; Ret	SAN; Ret	WAN; Ret	SUR; 2	AIR; Ret	ORA; Ret	WAR; 3	8th	15
1978	Bob Jane Racing	Holden LX Torana SS A9X	SYM; Ret	ORA	AMA	SAN; 1	WAN	CAL; 6	LAK	AIR	13th	14

=== Complete Phillip Island/Bathurst 500/1000 results ===
Year	Team	Co-drivers	Car	Class	Laps	Overall position	Class position
1960	Ecurie Dauphine	(Australia) Des West	Renault Dauphine	B	152	NA	10th
1963	Ford Australia	(Australia) Leo Geoghegan	Ford Cortina Mk.I GT	C	105	NA	DNF
1964	(Australia) Ford Motor Co	(Australia) Leo Geoghegan	Ford Cortina Mk.I GT	C	127	5th	5th
1965	(Australia) Ford Motor Co	(Australia) Leo Geoghegan	Ford Cortina Mk.I GT500	D	130	DSQ	DSQ
1967	Ford Australia	(Australia) Leo Geoghegan	Ford XR Falcon GT	D	130	**2nd**	**2nd**
1968	Ford Motor Company of Australia	(Australia) Leo Geoghegan	Ford XT Falcon GT	D	123	12th	7th
1969	Ford Australia	(Australia) Leo Geoghegan	Ford XW Falcon GTHO	D	128	5th	5th
1971	(Australia) McCluskey Ford Pty Ltd	(Australia) Brian Michelmore	Ford XY Falcon GT-HO Phase III	E	0	DNS	DNS
1973	Ford Australia	(Canada) Allan Moffat	Ford XA Falcon GT Hardtop	D	163	**1st**	**1st**
1975	(Australia) Allan Moffat Racing	(Canada) Allan Moffat	Ford XB Falcon GT Hardtop	D	109	DNF	DNF
1977	(Australia) Bob Jane 2UW Racing	(Australia) Bob Jane	Holden LX Torana SS A9X Hatchback	3001cc – 6000cc	35	DNF	DNF
1978	(Australia) Bob Jane T-Marts	(Australia) Garry Rogers	Holden LX Torana SS A9X Hatchback	A	29	DNF	DNF
1980	(Australia) Stockton Coin & Bullion Exchange Pty Ltd	(Australia) Paul Gulson	Holden VB Commodore	3001-6000cc	159	**3rd**	**3rd**
1981	(Australia) Army Reserve Racing Team	(Australia) Bob Muir	Ford XD Falcon	8 Cylinder & Over	92	28th	15th

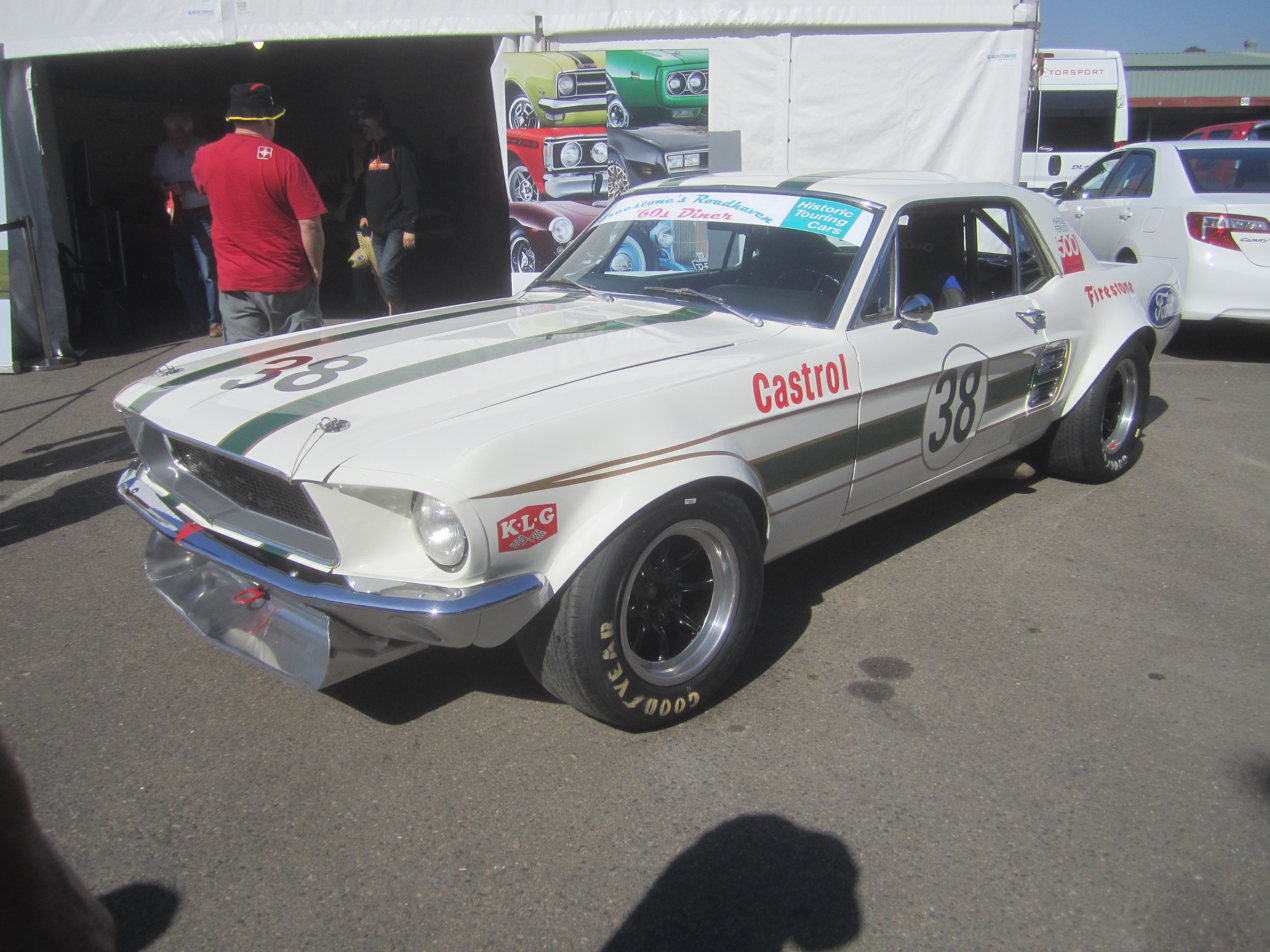
The 1967 Ford Mustang with which Ian Geoghegan won the 1967, 1968 and 1969 Australian Touring Car Championships. The car is pictured in 2013.

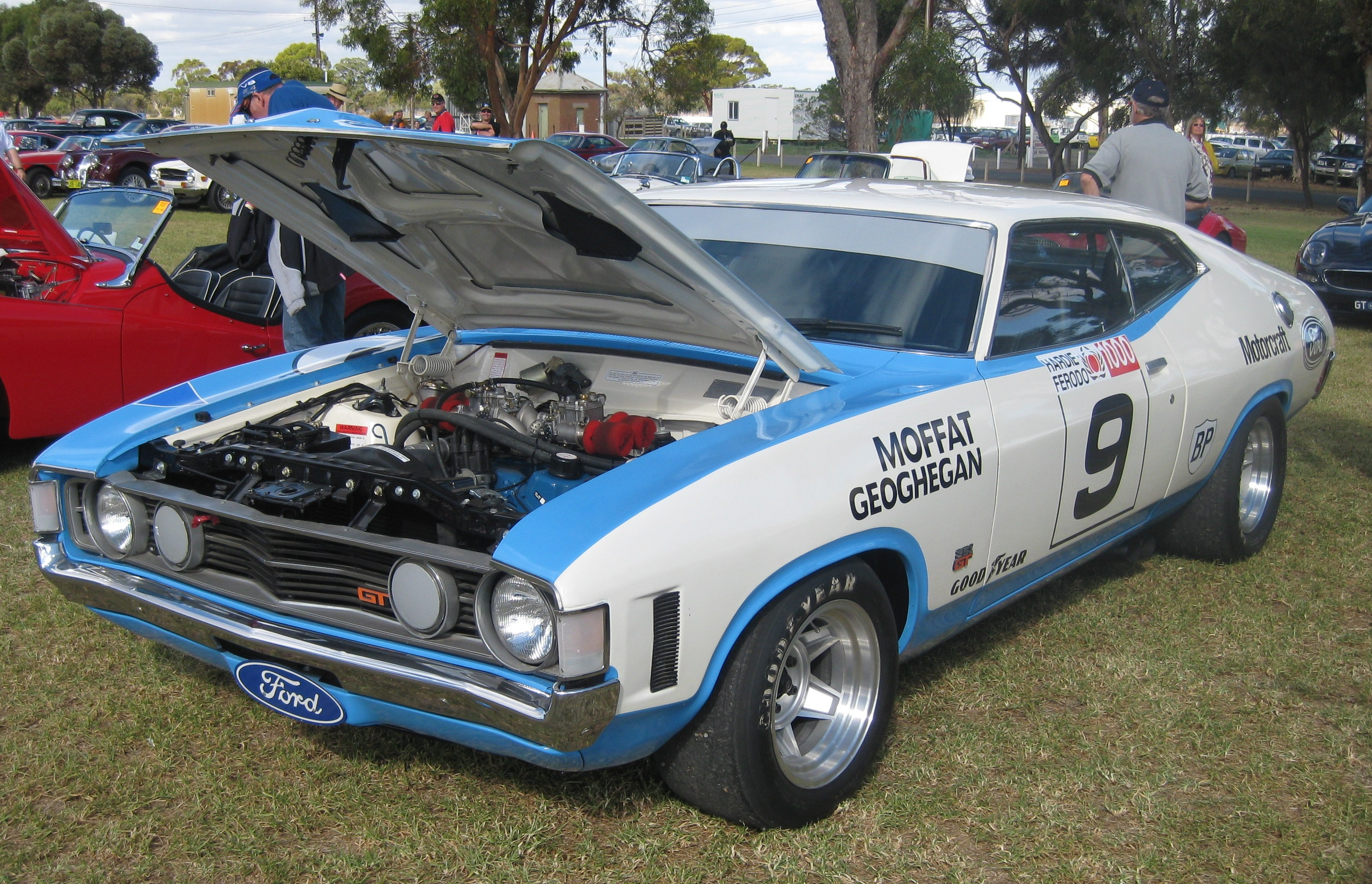
A race replica of the Ford XA Falcon GT Hardtop in which Geoghegan won the 1973 Hardie-Ferodo 1000 with Allan Moffat

Sporting positions
Preceded by Bob Jane	Winner of the Australian Touring Car Championship; 1964	Succeeded by Norm Beechey
Preceded by Norm Beechey	Winner of the Australian Touring Car Championship; 1966, 1967, 1968 & 1969	Succeeded by Norm Beechey
Preceded by Peter Brock	Winner of the Bathurst 1000; 1973 (with Allan Moffat)	Succeeded by John Goss; Kevin Bartlett
Records
Preceded by Bob Jane; 2 wins (1962 – 1974)	Most ATCC round wins 8 (1961 – 1978), 3rd win at the 1967 Australian Touring Car Championship	Succeeded by Bob Jane; 10 wins (1962 – 1974)
