= Queensland 500 =

Motorsport endurance race

- Race Information
Venue	Queensland Raceway
Number of times held	7
First held	1999
Last held	2008
- Race Format
- Race 1
Laps	161
Distance	500 km
- Last Event (2008)
- Overall Winner
(Australia) Grant Sherrin (Australia) David Russell	Howard Racing
- Race Winners
(Australia) Grant Sherrin (Australia) David Russell	Howard Racing

The Queensland 500 was a motorsport endurance race held at Queensland Raceway near Ipswich, Queensland, Australia. It was best known as a V8 Supercars race held from 1999 to 2002.

== History ==
=== Background ===
The Queensland 500 was launched by the V8 Supercars category in 1999 to replace the Sandown 500 as the two-driver endurance event in the build-up to the Bathurst 1000. Supported by the Queensland Government, it was held at the newly built Queensland Raceway. The Queensland 500 also counted for championship points, with both the 500 kilometre race and the Bathurst 1000 added to the championship in 1999 for the first time. In 1999 and 2000, Queensland Raceway hosted both the endurance event and a sprint round of the championship.

=== V8 Supercars ===
The first event in 1999 was won by Larry Perkins and Russell Ingall, who were defending champions of the 500 km event, having won the 1998 Tickford 500 at Sandown. The race proved crucial in the 1999 championship. Rather than pairing them together, the Holden Racing Team decided to split their two full-time drivers, Mark Skaife and Craig Lowndes, in the two-driver endurance races as they were both in championship contention. After Skaife suffered accident damage in an incident with Jason Bright, he could only finish 22nd, giving team-mate and eventual champion Lowndes a large points advantage with a third-place finish. In 2000, Holden Racing Team team-mates Skaife and Lowndes combined to win, this time helping Skaife in his successful championship campaign.

2001 saw a dramatic finish to the race due to a torrential rain shower. As the rain increased in the final five laps, Paul Radisich spun into a gravel trap out of the lead, giving the lead to the Perkins and Ingall entry. However, soon after, a red flag was waved, and as per the regulations the results were finalised as the standings on the second to last completed lap, meaning Radisich, driving with Steven Johnson, was still credited with the race win despite being beached in the gravel trap. 2002 saw a surprise victory in the form of David Besnard and Simon Wills, the only round win of both of their championship careers. The pair had only taken the lead on the penultimate lap when Greg Murphy ran low on fuel. The win was Ford's first round win since the Queensland 500 twelve months prior, while eventual seven-times champion Jamie Whincup also made his debut in the race.

=== Demise ===
After the collapse of original circuit owners, Motorsport Queensland took control. Their interest in the race waned and the race reverted to the status of a standard V8 Supercar sprint round from 2003. This sprint event continues to this day. The 500 km race returned to Sandown Raceway for 2003.

=== Revival ===
The race was revived from 2006 to 2008 as a GT, sportscar and touring car relay race. The Queensland 500 was run for the final time in 2008.

== Winners ==
Year	Event title	Winners	Team	Car
1999	Queensland 500	(Australia) Russell Ingall (Australia) Larry Perkins	Perkins Engineering	Holden VT Commodore
2000	Ozemail Queensland 500	(Australia) Craig Lowndes (Australia) Mark Skaife	Holden Racing Team	Holden VT Commodore
2001^{1}	V.I.P Petfoods Queensland 500	(Australia) Steven Johnson (New Zealand) Paul Radisich	Dick Johnson Racing	Ford AU Falcon
2002	V.I.P Petfoods Queensland 500	(Australia) David Besnard (New Zealand) Simon Wills	Stone Brothers Racing	Ford AU Falcon
2003 - 2005	not held			
2006	Queensland 500 Club Enduro	(United Kingdom) Rob Sherrard (Australia) Wayne Park	Wayne Park Motorsport Services	Porsche 962C; Holden Monaro 427C
2007	Queensland 500 Club Enduro	(United Kingdom) Tony Quinn (New Zealand) Craig Baird	VIP Petfoods P/L	Porsche 997 GT3 Cup
2008	Porsche Centre Gold Coast 500	(Australia) Grant Sherrin (Australia) David Russell	Howard Racing	Ford AU Falcon

Notes

- ^1 – Race was red flagged due to bad weather; results were declared as of lap 156.

== Sponsors ==
- 2000: OzEmail
- 2001–02: VIP Petfoods
- 2008: Porsche Centre Gold Coast

== See also ==
- Ipswich Super Sprint
- Sandown 500
- Phillip Island 500
- List of Australian Touring Car Championship races
