= 2008 Porsche Centre Gold Coast 500 =

The 2008 Porsche Centre Gold Coast 500 was the seventh 500km race held at Queensland Raceway. It was held on 15 November 2008, and only attracted nine entrants.

== Results ==
=== Qualifying 1 ===
Qualifying session 1 was held on Saturday, 15 November, at 10:30 a.m.

Pos	No.	Entrant	Driver	Car	Time
1	11	Lakemp	Russell Kempnich	Porsche 956	1:14.0813
2	32	Howard Racing	Grant Sherrin	Ford AU Falcon	1:14.1379
3	111	Juniper Racing	Shaun Juniper	Porsche 997 Cup Car	1:14.4265
4	29	V.I.P Petfoods Pty Ltd	Tony Quinn; Kent Quinn	Porsche GT3	1:14.8256
5	28	Sheep Station Racing	David Beard	Porsche GT3 Cup	1:16.2948
6	22	Team Pish	Steven Kepper; Terry Knight	Porsche 997 Cup Car	1:16.6513
7	55	Elite Fleet	Gary Leaton	Holden Monaro	1:19.2161
8	4	Hi-Way 1	Derek Hocking; Kim Rasker; Colin Giblett	Holden VZ Ute	1:27.7837
9	9	A Team	Stephen Pocock; Bruce LeGarde	Honda Civic	1:30.3741

=== Qualifying 2 ===
Qualifying session 2 was held on Saturday, 15 November, at 11:40 a.m.

Pos	No.	Entrant	Driver	Car	Time
1	29	V.I.P Petfoods Pty Ltd	Kent Quinn	Porsche GT3	1:13.7547
2	22	Team Pish	Terry Knight	Porsche 997 Cup Car	1:15.2913
3	55	Elite Fleet	Gary Leaton; D.Croswell	Holden Monaro	1:15.4580
4	32	Howard Racing	Grant Sherrin	Ford AU Falcon	1:15.7339
5	111	Juniper Racing	Shaun Juniper	Porsche 997 Cup Car	1:22.9772
6	4	Hi-Way 1	R.Rasker; C.Giblett	Holden VZ Ute	1:27.7751
7	28	Sheep Station Racing	Brad Rankin	Porsche GT3 Cup	1:34.4500

=== Race ===
The race was held on Saturday, 15 November, at 3:45 p.m.

Pos	No.	Entrant	Drivers	Car	Laps	Grid
Pos	No.	Entrant	Drivers	Engine	Laps	Grid
1	32	Howard Racing	Grant Sherrin; David Russell	Ford AU Falcon	155	3
1	32	Howard Racing	Grant Sherrin; David Russell	Ford Windsor 5.0L V8	155	3
2	11a	Lakemp	Russell Kempnich	Porsche 956	161*	2
2	11a	Lakemp	Russell Kempnich	Porsche Type-935 2.6L Turbo Flat-6	161*	2
2	11b	Lakemp	Roger Lago; Wayne Park	Porsche 997 Cup Car	161*	2
2	11b	Lakemp	Roger Lago; Wayne Park	Porsche 3.6L Flat-6	161*	2
3	29a	V.I.P Petfoods Pty Ltd	Kent Quinn	Porsche 996 Cup Car	161*	1
3	29a	V.I.P Petfoods Pty Ltd	Kent Quinn	Porsche 3.6L Flat-6	161*	1
3	29b	V.I.P Petfoods Pty Ltd	Tony Quinn	Porsche 997 GT3-RSR	161*	1
3	29b	V.I.P Petfoods Pty Ltd	Tony Quinn	Porsche 3.6L Flat-6	161*	1
4	22a	Team Pish	Terry Knight; Peter Mills	Porsche 996 Cup Car	149	5
4	22a	Team Pish	Terry Knight; Peter Mills	Porsche 3.6L Flat-6	149	5
4	22b	Team Pish	Steven Kepper; Matthew Coleman	Porsche 997 Cup Car	149	5
4	22b	Team Pish	Steven Kepper; Matthew Coleman	Porsche 3.6L Flat-6	149	5
5	111	Juniper Racing	Shaun Juniper; Graeme Juniper	Porsche 997 Cup Car	148	4
5	111	Juniper Racing	Shaun Juniper; Graeme Juniper	Porsche 3.6L Flat-6	148	4
6	28a	Sheep Station Racing	Brad Rankin; Roger Burman	Porsche 996 Cup Car	148	7
6	28a	Sheep Station Racing	Brad Rankin; Roger Burman	Porsche 3.6L Flat-6	148	7
6	28b	Sheep Station Racing	David Beard	Porsche 996 Turbo S	148	7
6	28b	Sheep Station Racing	David Beard	Porsche 3.6L Turbo Flat-6	148	7
6	28c	Sheep Station Racing	James Austin	Porsche 996 Cup Car	148	7
6	28c	Sheep Station Racing	James Austin	Porsche 3.6L Flat-6	148	7
7	4a	Hi-Way 1	Derek Hocking	Holden VY Commodore SS	131	8
7	4a	Hi-Way 1	Derek Hocking	Chevrolet Generation III LS1 5.7L V8	131	8
7	4b	Hi-Way 1	Kim Rasker	Holden VZ Ute SS	131	8
7	4b	Hi-Way 1	Kim Rasker	Chevrolet Generation III LS1 5.7L V8	131	8
7	4c	Hi-Way 1	Colin Giblett	Holden VT Commodore	131	8
7	4c	Hi-Way 1	Colin Giblett	Holden Ecotec 3.6L V6	131	8
7	4d	Hi-Way 1	Rod Rasker	Holden VZ Ute SS	131	8
7	4d	Hi-Way 1	Rod Rasker	Chevrolet Generation III LS1 5.7L V8	131	8
8	9a	A Team	Bruce LeGarde	Honda Civic	126	9
8	9a	A Team	Bruce LeGarde	Honda D16Y4 1.6L I4	126	9
8	9b	A Team	Stephen Pocock	Honda Civic	126	9
8	9b	A Team	Stephen Pocock	Honda EW2 1.5L I4	126	9
DNF	55a	Elite Fleet	Gary Leaton; John English	Holden VZ Monaro	75	6
DNF	55a	Elite Fleet	Gary Leaton; John English	Chevrolet Generation III LS1 5.7L V8	75	6
DNF	55b	Elite Fleet	Ryan McLeod; Dean Croswell	Holden VZ Commodore	75	6
DNF	55b	Elite Fleet	Ryan McLeod; Dean Croswell	Holden Aurora 5.0L V8	75	6

* Cars 11 and 29 finished first and second respectively, however were relegated to positions two and three after the race.
