= List of Australian Touring Car Championship races =

The list of Australian Touring Car Championship Races is a list of all the races or rounds which have been held in the combined 66-year history of the Australian Touring Car Championship, V8 Supercars Championship, and Supercars Championship.

As of the end of the 2025 season, 1,206 championship races have been held since the first race at the Gnoo Blas Motor Racing Circuit in 1960. Since then, the 1,000th championship race was held at the Albert Park Circuit in March 2019. Sandown Raceway has hosted the most events, with 55, while Wanneroo Raceway, Perth has hosted the most individual races, with 100. 88 different drivers have won an ATCC/Supercars championship race. Jamie Whincup has won the most championship races, with 125 victories.

== List of races ==
Navigation
- 1960s: 1960
- 1961
- 1962
- 1963
- 1964
- 1965
- 1966
- 1967
- 1968
- 1969
- 1970s: 1970
- 1971
- 1972
- 1973
- 1974
- 1975
- 1976
- 1977
- 1978
- 1979
- 1980s: 1980
- 1981
- 1982
- 1983
- 1984
- 1985
- 1986
- 1987
- 1988
- 1989
- 1990s: 1990
- 1991
- 1992
- 1993
- 1994
- 1995
- 1996
- 1997
- 1998
- 1999
- 2000s: 2000
- 2001
- 2002
- 2003
- 2004
- 2005
- 2006
- 2007
- 2008
- 2009
- 2010s: 2010
- 2011
- 2012
- 2013
- 2014
- 2015
- 2016
- 2017
- 2018
- 2019
- 2020s: 2020
- 2021
- 2022
- 2023
- 2024
- 2025

Results 1960–1984 sourced from:
Results 1996–2008 sourced from:

=== 1960s ===
Year	Round	Date	Circuit	Winner	Team	Car
1960		1 February	Gnoo Blas Motor Racing Circuit	David McKay	D McKay	Jaguar Mark 1
1961		3 September	Lowood Airfield Circuit	Bill Pitt		Jaguar Mark 1
1962		3 March	Longford Circuit	Bob Jane		Jaguar Mark 2
1963		15 April	Mallala Motor Sport Park	Bob Jane	R Jane	Jaguar Mark 2
1964		26 July	Lakeside International Raceway	Ian Geoghegan	Total Team	Ford Cortina Mark I GT
1965		11 April	Sandown Raceway	Norm Beechey	Neptune Racing Team	Ford Mustang
1966		10 April	Mount Panorama Circuit	Ian Geoghegan	Total Team	Ford Mustang
1967		30 July	Lakeside International Raceway	Ian Geoghegan	Mustang Team	Ford Mustang
1968		8 September	Warwick Farm Raceway	Ian Geoghegan	Mustang Team	Ford Mustang
1969	1	23 March	Calder Park Raceway	Bob Jane	Bob Jane Racing	Ford Mustang
1969	2	7 April	Mount Panorama Circuit	Ian Geoghegan	Mustang Team	Ford Mustang
1969	3	16 June	Mallala Motor Sport Park	Ian Geoghegan	Mustang Team	Ford Mustang
1969	4	31 August	Surfers Paradise Raceway	Norm Beechey	Norm Beechey	Holden HK Monaro GTS327
1969	5	16 November	Symmons Plains Raceway	Norm Beechey	Norm Beechey	Holden HK Monaro GTS327

=== 1970s ===
Year	Round	Date	Circuit	Winner	Team	Car	Race winners
1970	1	22 March	Calder Park Raceway	Allan Moffat	Allan Moffat Racing	Ford Boss 302 Mustang	
1970	2	30 March	Mount Panorama Circuit	Norm Beechey	Shell Racing Team	Holden HT Monaro GTS350	
1970	3	19 April	Sandown Raceway	Norm Beechey	Shell Racing Team	Holden HT Monaro GTS350	
1970	4	16 June	Mallala Motor Sport Park	Ian Geoghegan	Geoghegan's Sporty Cars	Ford Mustang	
1970	5	12 July	Warwick Farm Raceway	Jim McKeown	Shell Racing Team	Porsche 911S	
1970	6	26 July	Lakeside International Raceway	Norm Beechey	Shell Racing Team	Holden HT Monaro GTS350	
1970	7	15 November	Symmons Plains Raceway	Jim McKeown	Shell Racing Team	Porsche 911S	
1971	1	1 March	Symmons Plains Raceway	Allan Moffat	Team Coca-Cola AMR	Ford Boss 302 Mustang	
1971	2	21 March	Calder Park Raceway	Norm Beechey	Shell Racing Team	Holden HT Monaro GTS350	
1971	3	14 April	Sandown Raceway	Bob Jane	Bob Jane Racing Team	Chevrolet Camaro ZL-1	
1971	4	14 May	Surfers Paradise Raceway	Allan Moffat	Team Coca-Cola AMR	Ford Boss 302 Mustang	
1971	5	14 June	Mallala Motor Sport Park	Bob Jane	Bob Jane Racing Team	Chevrolet Camaro ZL-1	
1971	6	25 July	Lakeside International Raceway	Allan Moffat	Team Coca-Cola AMR	Ford Boss 302 Mustang	
1971	7	8 August	Oran Park Raceway	Bob Jane	Bob Jane Racing Team	Chevrolet Camaro ZL-1	
1972	1	6 March	Symmons Plains Raceway	Allan Moffat	Team Coca-Cola AMR	Ford Boss 302 Mustang	
1972	2	19 March	Calder Park Raceway	Bob Jane	Bob Jane Racing Team	Chevrolet Camaro ZL-1	
1972	3	3 April	Mount Panorama Circuit	Ian Geoghegan	Geoghegans Sporty Cars	Ford XY Falcon GTHO Phase III	
1972	4	16 April	Sandown Raceway	Allan Moffat	Team Coca-Cola AMR	Ford Boss 302 Mustang	
1972	5	11 June	Adelaide International Raceway	Bob Jane	Bob Jane Racing Team	Chevrolet Camaro ZL-1	
1972	6	9 July	Warwick Farm Raceway	Bob Jane	Bob Jane Racing Team	Chevrolet Camaro ZL-1	
1972	7	22 July	Surfers Paradise Raceway	Bob Jane	Bob Jane Racing Team	Chevrolet Camaro ZL-1	
1972	8	6 August	Oran Park Raceway	Allan Moffat	Team Coca-Cola AMR	Ford Boss 302 Mustang	
1973	1	5 March	Symmons Plains Raceway	Allan Moffat	Ford Motor Company	Ford XY Falcon GTHO Phase III	
1973	2	18 March	Calder Park Raceway	Allan Moffat	Ford Motor Company	Ford XY Falcon GTHO Phase III	
1973	3	15 April	Sandown Raceway	Allan Moffat	Ford Motor Company	Ford XY Falcon GTHO Phase III	
1973	4	6 May	Wanneroo Raceway	Allan Moffat	Ford Motor Company	Ford XY Falcon GTHO Phase III	
1973	5	20 May	Surfers Paradise Raceway	Peter Brock	Holden Dealer Team	Holden LJ Torana GTR XU-1	
1973	6	10 June	Adelaide International Raceway	Peter Brock	Holden Dealer Team	Holden LJ Torana GTR XU-1	
1973	7	24 June	Oran Park Raceway	Allan Moffat	Ford Motor Company	Ford XY Falcon GTHO Phase III	
1973	8	15 July	Warwick Farm Raceway	Peter Brock	Holden Dealer Team	Holden LJ Torana GTR XU-1	
1974	1	4 March	Symmons Plains Raceway	Peter Brock	Holden Dealer Team	Holden LJ Torana GTR XU-1	
1974	2	17 March	Calder Park Raceway	Peter Brock	Holden Dealer Team	Holden LJ Torana GTR XU-1	
1974	3	7 April	Sandown Raceway	Allan Moffat	Allan Moffat Racing	Ford XB Falcon GT Hardtop	
1974	4	14 April	Amaroo Park	Peter Brock	Holden Dealer Team	Holden LJ Torana GTR XU-1	
1974	5	28 April	Oran Park Raceway	Allan Moffat	Allan Moffat Racing	Ford XB Falcon GT Hardtop	Allan Moffat; Ray Gulson
1974	6	19 May	Surfers Paradise Raceway	Peter Brock	Holden Dealer Team	Holden LH Torana SL/R 5000	
1974	7	9 June	Adelaide International Raceway	Peter Brock	Holden Dealer Team	Holden LH Torana SL/R 5000	
1975	1	3 March	Symmons Plains Raceway	Colin Bond	Holden Dealer Team	Holden LH Torana SL/R 5000 L34	
1975	2	16 March	Calder Park Raceway	Allan Grice	Craven Mild Racing	Holden LH Torana SL/R 5000 L34	
1975	3	30 March	Amaroo Park	Bob Morris	Ron Hodgson Racing	Holden LH Torana SL/R 5000 L34	
1975	4	27 April	Oran Park Raceway	Allan Grice	Craven Mild Racing	Holden LH Torana SL/R 5000 L34	
1975	5	18 May	Surfers Paradise Raceway	Bob Morris	Ron Hodgson Racing	Holden LH Torana SL/R 5000 L34	
1975	6	8 June	Adelaide International Raceway	Colin Bond	Holden Dealer Team	Holden LH Torana SL/R 5000 L34	
1975	7	29 June	Lakeside International Raceway	Colin Bond	Holden Dealer Team	Holden LH Torana SL/R 5000 L34	
1976	1	29 February	Symmons Plains Raceway	John Harvey	B&D Autos	Holden LH Torana SL/R 5000 L34	
1976	2	17 March	Calder Park Raceway	Allan Moffat	Allan Moffat Racing	Ford XB Falcon GT Hardtop	
1976	3	28 March	Oran Park Raceway	Allan Moffat	Allan Moffat Racing	Ford XB Falcon GT Hardtop	Allan Grice; Allan Moffat
1976	4	11 April	Sandown Raceway	Colin Bond	Holden Dealer Team	Holden LH Torana SL/R 5000 L34	
1976	5	18 April	Amaroo Park	Charlie O'Brien	O'Brien's Transport-Shell Sport	Holden LH Torana SL/R 5000 L34	Charlie O'Brien; Allan Moffat
1976	6	6 June	Adelaide International Raceway	Allan Moffat	Allan Moffat Racing	Ford XB Falcon GT Hardtop	Allan Moffat; Allan Moffat
1976	7	27 June	Lakeside International Raceway	Colin Bond	Holden Dealer Team	Holden LH Torana SL/R 5000 L34	Allan Moffat; Colin Bond
1976	8	12 September	Sandown Raceway	Peter Brock	Team Brock	Holden LH Torana SL/R 5000 L34	
1976	9	24 October	Adelaide International Raceway	Allan Grice	Craven Mild Racing	Holden LH Torana SL/R 5000 L34	
1976	10	30 October	Surfers Paradise Raceway	Peter Brock	Team Brock	Holden LH Torana SL/R 5000 L34	
1976	11	28 November	Phillip Island Grand Prix Circuit	Colin Bond	Holden Dealer Team	Holden LH Torana SL/R 5000 L34	
1977	1	7 March	Symmons Plains Raceway	Allan Moffat	Moffat Ford Dealers	Ford XB Falcon GT Hardtop	Allan Moffat; Allan Moffat
1977	2	20 March	Calder Park Raceway	Allan Moffat	Moffat Ford Dealers	Ford XB Falcon GT Hardtop	
1977	3	27 March	Oran Park Raceway	Allan Moffat	Moffat Ford Dealers	Ford XB Falcon GT Hardtop	
1977	4	10 April	Amaroo Park	Allan Moffat	Moffat Ford Dealers	Ford XB Falcon GT Hardtop	
1977	5	17 April	Sandown Raceway	Allan Moffat	Moffat Ford Dealers	Ford XB Falcon GT Hardtop	
1977	6	5 June	Adelaide International Raceway	Colin Bond	Moffat Ford Dealers	Ford XB Falcon GT Hardtop	
1977	7	26 June	Lakeside International Raceway	Peter Brock	Bill Patterson Motors	Holden LH Torana SL/R 5000 L34	
1977	8	11 September	Sandown Raceway	Peter Brock	Bill Patterson Motors	Holden LX Torana SS A9X	
1977	9	23 October	Adelaide International Raceway	Allan Moffat	Moffat Ford Dealers	Ford XC Falcon GS500 Hardtop	
1977	10	6 November	Surfers Paradise Raceway	Allan Moffat	Moffat Ford Dealers	Ford XC Falcon GS500 Hardtop	
1977	11	20 November	Phillip Island Grand Prix Circuit	Allan Grice	Craven Mild Racing	Holden LX Torana SS A9X	
1978	1	5 March	Symmons Plains Raceway	Peter Brock	Holden Dealer Team	Holden LX Torana SS A9X	
1978	2	26 March	Oran Park Raceway	Peter Brock	Holden Dealer Team	Holden LX Torana SS A9X	
1978	3	9 April	Amaroo Park	Allan Grice	Craven Mild Racing	Holden LX Torana SS A9X	
1978	4	16 April	Sandown Raceway	Ian Geoghegan	Bob Jane T-Marts	Holden LX Torana SS A9X	
1978	5	7 May	Wanneroo Raceway	Peter Brock	Holden Dealer Team	Holden LX Torana SS A9X	Peter Brock; Peter Brock
1978	6	28 May	Calder Park Raceway	Bob Morris	Ron Hodgson Racing	Holden LX Torana SS A9X	
1978	7	25 June	Lakeside International Raceway	Allan Moffat	Moffat Ford Dealers	Ford XC Falcon GS500 Hardtop	
1978	8	8 August	Adelaide International Raceway	Colin Bond	Moffat Ford Dealers	Ford XC Falcon GS500 Hardtop	
1979	1	4 March	Symmons Plains Raceway	John Harvey	Holden Dealer Team	Holden LX Torana SS A9X	
1979	2	18 March	Calder Park Raceway	Peter Brock	Holden Dealer Team	Holden LX Torana SS A9X	
1979	3	25 March	Oran Park Raceway	Bob Morris	Ron Hodgson Racing	Holden LX Torana SS A9X	Lawrie Nelson; Bob Morris
1979	4	7 April	Sandown Raceway	Bob Morris	Ron Hodgson Racing	Holden LX Torana SS A9X	
1979	5	6 May	Wanneroo Raceway	Peter Brock	Holden Dealer Team	Holden LX Torana SS A9X	
1979	6	20 May	Surfers Paradise Raceway	Peter Brock	Holden Dealer Team	Holden LX Torana SS A9X	
1979	7	22 June	Lakeside International Raceway	Bob Morris	Ron Hodgson Racing	Holden LX Torana SS A9X	
1979	8	28 July	Adelaide International Raceway	Bob Morris	Ron Hodgson Racing	Holden LX Torana SS A9X	

=== 1980s ===
Year	Round	Date	Circuit	Winner	Team	Car	Race winners
1980	1	2 March	Symmons Plains Raceway	Peter Brock	Holden Dealer Team	Holden VB Commodore	
1980	2	15 March	Calder Park Raceway	Peter Brock	Holden Dealer Team	Holden VB Commodore	Peter Brock; Peter Brock
1980	3	30 March	Lakeside International Raceway	Peter Brock	Holden Dealer Team	Holden VB Commodore	
1980	4	13 April	Sandown Raceway	Kevin Bartlett	Nine Network Racing Team	Chevrolet Camaro Z28	Peter Brock; Kevin Bartlett
1980	5	27 April	Wanneroo Raceway	Allan Grice	Craven Mild Racing	Holden LX Torana SS A9X	Allan Grice; Allan Grice
1980	6	18 May	Surfers Paradise Raceway	Peter Brock	Holden Dealer Team	Holden VB Commodore	
1980	7	1 June	Adelaide International Raceway	Kevin Bartlett	Nine Network Racing Team	Chevrolet Camaro Z28	
1980	8	16 June	Oran Park Raceway	Bob Morris	Craven Mild Racing	Holden VB Commodore	
1981	1	1 March	Symmons Plains Raceway	Dick Johnson	Dick Johnson Racing	Ford XD Falcon	
1981	2	15 March	Calder Park Raceway	Peter Brock	Holden Dealer Team	Holden VC Commodore	Dick Johnson; Peter Brock
1981	3	22 March	Oran Park Raceway	Dick Johnson	Dick Johnson Racing	Ford XD Falcon	
1981	4	12 April	Sandown Raceway	Dick Johnson	Dick Johnson Racing	Ford XD Falcon	Dick Johnson; Dick Johnson
1981	5	26 April	Wanneroo Raceway	Peter Brock	Holden Dealer Team	Holden VC Commodore	
1981	6	3 May	Adelaide International Raceway	Peter Brock	Holden Dealer Team	Holden VC Commodore	Peter Brock; Dick Johnson
1981	7	17 May	Surfers Paradise Raceway	Dick Johnson	Dick Johnson Racing	Ford XD Falcon	
1981	8	21 June	Lakeside International Raceway	Dick Johnson	Dick Johnson Racing	Ford XD Falcon	
1982	1	14 February	Sandown Raceway	Dick Johnson	Dick Johnson Racing	Ford XD Falcon	Dick Johnson; Dick Johnson
1982	2	28 February	Calder Park Raceway	Dick Johnson	Dick Johnson Racing	Ford XD Falcon	
1982	3	7 March	Symmons Plains Raceway	Peter Brock	Holden Dealer Team	Holden VC Commodore	
1982	4	21 March	Oran Park Raceway	Kevin Bartlett	Nine Network Racing Team	Chevrolet Camaro Z28	
1982	5	4 April	Lakeside International Raceway	Allan Moffat	Peter Stuyvesant International Racing	Mazda RX-7	
1982	6	28 April	Wanneroo Raceway	Allan Grice	Re-Car Racing	Holden VH Commodore	
1982	7	2 May	Adelaide International Raceway	Dick Johnson	Dick Johnson Racing	Ford XD Falcon	
1982	8	16 May	Surfers Paradise Raceway	Allan Moffat	Peter Stuyvesant International Racing	Mazda RX-7	
1983	1	6 February	Calder Park Raceway	Allan Moffat	Peter Stuyvesant International Racing	Mazda RX-7	
1983	2	20 February	Sandown Raceway	Allan Grice	STP Roadways Racing	Holden VH Commodore SS	
1983	3	13 March	Symmons Plains Raceway	Allan Grice	STP Roadways Racing	Holden VH Commodore SS	
1983	4	24 April	Wanneroo Raceway	Allan Moffat	Peter Stuyvesant International Racing	Mazda RX-7	
1983	5	1 May	Adelaide International Raceway	Peter Brock	Holden Dealer Team	Holden VH Commodore SS	
1983	6	15 May	Surfers Paradise Raceway	Allan Moffat	Peter Stuyvesant International Racing	Mazda RX-7	
1983	7	29 May	Oran Park Raceway	Allan Moffat	Peter Stuyvesant International Racing	Mazda RX-7	
1983	8	19 June	Lakeside International Raceway	Peter Brock	Holden Dealer Team	Holden VH Commodore SS	
1984	1	18 February	Sandown Raceway	Peter Brock	Holden Dealer Team	Holden VH Commodore SS	
1984	2	11 March	Symmons Plains Raceway	Peter Brock	Holden Dealer Team	Holden VH Commodore SS	
1984	3	1 April	Wanneroo Raceway	Allan Moffat	Peter Stuyvesant International Racing	Mazda RX-7	
1984	4	13 May	Surfers Paradise Raceway	Dick Johnson	Dick Johnson Racing	Ford XE Falcon	
1984	5	27 May	Oran Park Raceway	Bob Morris	Bob Morris	Mazda RX-7	
1984	6	17 June	Lakeside International Raceway	George Fury	Nissan Motorsport Australia	Nissan Bluebird Turbo	
1984	7	1 July	Adelaide International Raceway	Allan Grice	Roadways Racing	Holden VH Commodore SS	
1985	1	10 February	Winton Motor Raceway	Jim Richards	JPS Team BMW	BMW 635 CSi	
1985	2	24 February	Sandown Raceway	Peter Brock	Mobil Holden Dealer Team	Holden VK Commodore	
1985	3	11 March	Symmons Plains Raceway	Robbie Francevic	Mark Petch Seals	Volvo 240T	
1985	4	31 March	Wanneroo Raceway	Jim Richards	JPS Team BMW	BMW 635 CSi	
1985	5	21 April	Adelaide International Raceway	Jim Richards	JPS Team BMW	BMW 635 CSi	
1985	6	28 April	Calder Park Raceway	Jim Richards	JPS Team BMW	BMW 635 CSi	
1985	7	19 May	Surfers Paradise Raceway	Jim Richards	JPS Team BMW	BMW 635 CSi	
1985	8	23 June	Lakeside International Raceway	Jim Richards	JPS Team BMW	BMW 635 CSi	
1985	9	7 July	Amaroo Park	Jim Richards	JPS Team BMW	BMW 635 CSi	
1985	10	13 July	Oran Park Raceway	Robbie Francevic	Mark Petch Seals	Volvo 240T	
1986	1	2 March	Amaroo Park	Robbie Francevic	Volvo Dealer Team	Volvo 240T	
1986	2	9 March	Symmons Plains Raceway	Robbie Francevic	Volvo Dealer Team	Volvo 240T	
1986	3	13 April	Sandown Raceway	George Fury	Peter Jackson Nissan Racing	Nissan Skyline DR30 RS	
1986	4	27 April	Adelaide International Raceway	Robbie Francevic	Volvo Dealer Team	Volvo 240T	
1986	5	6 May	Wanneroo Raceway	George Fury	Peter Jackson Nissan Racing	Nissan Skyline DR30 RS	
1986	6	18 May	Surfers Paradise Raceway	Peter Brock	Mobil Holden Dealer Team	Holden VK Commodore SS Group A	
1986	7	1 June	Calder Park Raceway	George Fury	Peter Jackson Nissan Racing	Nissan Skyline DR30 RS	
1986	8	15 June	Lakeside International Raceway	George Fury	Peter Jackson Nissan Racing	Nissan Skyline DR30 RS	
1986	9	29 June	Winton Motor Raceway	Jim Richards	JPS Team BMW	BMW 635 CSi	
1986	10	13 July	Oran Park Raceway	George Fury	Peter Jackson Nissan Racing	Nissan Skyline DR30 RS	
1987	1	1 March	Calder Park Raceway	Glenn Seton	Peter Jackson Nissan Racing	Nissan Skyline DR30 RS	
1987	2	8 March	Symmons Plains Raceway	George Fury	Peter Jackson Nissan Racing	Nissan Skyline DR30 RS	
1987	3	13 March	Lakeside International Raceway	Jim Richards	JPS Team BMW	BMW M3	
1987	4	26 April	Wanneroo Raceway	Glenn Seton	Peter Jackson Nissan Racing	Nissan Skyline DR30 RS	
1987	5	5 May	Adelaide International Raceway	Dick Johnson	Dick Johnson Racing	Ford Sierra RS Cosworth	
1987	6	31 May	Surfers Paradise Raceway	Jim Richards	JPS Team BMW	BMW M3	
1987	7	7 June	Sandown Raceway	Glenn Seton	Peter Jackson Nissan Racing	Nissan Skyline DR30 RS	
1987	8	21 June	Amaroo Park	Jim Richards	JPS Team BMW	BMW M3	
1987	9	5 July	Oran Park Raceway	Jim Richards	JPS Team BMW	BMW M3	
1988	1	6 March	Calder Park Raceway	Dick Johnson	Dick Johnson Racing	Ford Sierra RS500	
1988	2	13 March	Symmons Plains Raceway	Dick Johnson	Dick Johnson Racing	Ford Sierra RS500	
1988	3	10 April	Winton Motor Raceway	John Bowe	Dick Johnson Racing	Ford Sierra RS500	
1988	4	24 April	Wanneroo Raceway	Dick Johnson	Dick Johnson Racing	Ford Sierra RS500	
1988	5	1 May	Adelaide International Raceway	Dick Johnson	Dick Johnson Racing	Ford Sierra RS500	
1988	6	22 May	Lakeside International Raceway	Tony Longhurst	Freeport Motorsport	Ford Sierra RS500	
1988	7	29 May	Sandown Raceway	Dick Johnson	Dick Johnson Racing	Ford Sierra RS500	
1988	8	19 June	Amaroo Park	John Bowe	Dick Johnson Racing	Ford Sierra RS500	
1988	9	17 July	Oran Park Raceway	Dick Johnson	Dick Johnson Racing	Ford Sierra RS500	
1989	1	5 March	Amaroo Park	John Bowe	Dick Johnson Racing	Ford Sierra RS500	
1989	2	12 March	Symmons Plains Raceway	Dick Johnson	Dick Johnson Racing	Ford Sierra RS500	
1989	3	16 April	Lakeside International Raceway	Dick Johnson	Dick Johnson Racing	Ford Sierra RS500	
1989	4	30 April	Wanneroo Raceway	John Bowe	Dick Johnson Racing	Ford Sierra RS500	
1989	5	7 May	Mallala Motor Sport Park	Dick Johnson	Dick Johnson Racing	Ford Sierra RS500	
1989	6	21 May	Sandown Raceway	Dick Johnson	Dick Johnson Racing	Ford Sierra RS500	
1989	7	4 June	Winton Motor Raceway	George Fury	Nissan Motorsport Australia	Nissan Skyline HR31 GTS-R	
1989	8	9 July	Oran Park Raceway	Peter Brock	Mobil 1 Racing	Ford Sierra RS500	

=== 1990s ===
Year	Round	Date	Circuit	Winner	Team	Car	Race winners
1990	1	25 February	Amaroo Park	Jim Richards	Nissan Motorsport Australia	Nissan Skyline HR31 GTS-R	
1990	2	11 March	Symmons Plains Raceway	Dick Johnson	Dick Johnson Racing	Ford Sierra RS500	
1990	3	25 March	Phillip Island Grand Prix Circuit	Dick Johnson	Dick Johnson Racing	Ford Sierra RS500	
1990	4	8 April	Winton Motor Raceway	Jim Richards	Nissan Motorsport Australia	Nissan Skyline HR31 GTS-R	
1990	5	6 May	Lakeside International Raceway	Colin Bond	Caltex CXT Racing	Ford Sierra RS500	
1990	6	10 June	Mallala Motor Sport Park	Colin Bond	Caltex CXT Racing	Ford Sierra RS500	
1990	7	24 June	Wanneroo Raceway	Peter Brock	Mobil 1 Racing	Ford Sierra RS500	
1990	8	15 July	Oran Park Raceway	Jim Richards	Nissan Motorsport Australia	Nissan Skyline R32 GT-R	
1991	1	24 February	Sandown Raceway	Jim Richards	Nissan Motorsport Australia	Nissan Skyline R32 GT-R	
1991	2	10 March	Symmons Plains Raceway	Jim Richards	Nissan Motorsport Australia	Nissan Skyline R32 GT-R	
1991	3	14 April	Wanneroo Raceway	Mark Skaife	Nissan Motorsport Australia	Nissan Skyline R32 GT-R	
1991	4	28 April	Lakeside International Raceway	Jim Richards	Nissan Motorsport Australia	Nissan Skyline R32 GT-R	
1991	5	5 May	Winton Motor Raceway	Jim Richards	Nissan Motorsport Australia	Nissan Skyline R32 GT-R	
1991	6	2 June	Amaroo Park	Tony Longhurst	Benson & Hedges Racing	BMW M3 Evolution	
1991	7	23 June	Mallala Motor Sport Park	Mark Skaife	Nissan Motorsport Australia	Nissan Skyline R32 GT-R	
1991	8	14 July	Lakeside International Raceway	Tony Longhurst	Benson & Hedges Racing	BMW M3 Evolution	
1991	9	11 August	Oran Park Raceway	Mark Skaife	Nissan Motorsport Australia	Nissan Skyline R32 GT-R	
1992	1	23 February	Amaroo Park	Mark Skaife	Gibson Motorsport	Nissan Skyline R32 GT-R	Peter Brock; Mark Skaife
1992	2	8 March	Sandown Raceway	John Bowe	Dick Johnson Racing	Ford Sierra RS500	John Bowe; John Bowe
1992	3	15 March	Symmons Plains Raceway	Glenn Seton	Glenn Seton Racing	Ford Sierra RS500	Glenn Seton; Glenn Seton
1992	4	5 April	Winton Motor Raceway	Mark Skaife	Gibson Motorsport	Nissan Skyline R32 GT-R	Mark Skaife; Mark Skaife
1992	5	3 May	Lakeside International Raceway	Tony Longhurst	Benson & Hedges Racing	BMW M3 Evolution	Tony Longhurst; Tony Longhurst
1992	6	24 May	Eastern Creek Raceway	John Bowe	Dick Johnson Racing	Ford Sierra RS500	John Bowe; John Bowe
1992	7	31 May	Mallala Motor Sport Park	Mark Skaife	Gibson Motorsport	Nissan Skyline R32 GT-R	Mark Skaife; Mark Skaife
1992	8	7 June	Barbagallo Raceway	John Bowe	Dick Johnson Racing	Ford Sierra RS500	John Bowe; John Bowe
1992	9	21 June	Oran Park Raceway	Mark Skaife	Gibson Motorsport	Nissan Skyline R32 GT-R	Mark Skaife; Mark Skaife
1993	1	28 February	Amaroo Park	John Bowe	Dick Johnson Racing	Ford EB Falcon	Peter Doulman; Dick Johnson; John Bowe
1993	2	14 March	Symmons Plains Raceway	Alan Jones	Glenn Seton Racing	Ford EB Falcon	Alan Jones; Alan Jones
1993	3	4 April	Phillip Island Grand Prix Circuit	Glenn Seton	Glenn Seton Racing	Ford EB Falcon	Glenn Seton; Glenn Seton
1993	4	18 April	Lakeside International Raceway	Alan Jones	Glenn Seton Racing	Ford EB Falcon	Dick Johnson; Alan Jones
1993	5	16 May	Winton Motor Raceway	Glenn Seton	Glenn Seton Racing	Ford EB Falcon	Glenn Seton; Glenn Seton
1993	6	6 June	Eastern Creek Raceway	Glenn Seton	Glenn Seton Racing	Ford EB Falcon	Glenn Seton; Glenn Seton
1993	7	4 July	Mallala Motor Sport Park	Glenn Seton	Glenn Seton Racing	Ford EB Falcon	Mark Skaife; Glenn Seton
1993	8	11 July	Barbagallo Raceway	Jim Richards	Gibson Motorsport	Holden VP Commodore	Mark Skaife; Jim Richards
1993	9	8 August	Oran Park Raceway	Jim Richards	Gibson Motorsport	Holden VP Commodore	Peter Brock; Jim Richards
1994	1	27 February	Amaroo Park	Mark Skaife	Gibson Motorsport	Holden VP Commodore	Mark Skaife; Mark Skaife
1994	2	6 March	Sandown Raceway	Mark Skaife	Gibson Motorsport	Holden VP Commodore	Mark Skaife; Mark Skaife
1994	3	13 March	Symmons Plains Raceway	Mark Skaife	Gibson Motorsport	Holden VP Commodore	Mark Skaife; Mark Skaife
1994	4	10 April	Phillip Island Grand Prix Circuit	Glenn Seton	Glenn Seton Racing	Ford EB Falcon	Glenn Seton; Glenn Seton
1994	5	24 April	Lakeside International Raceway	Larry Perkins	Perkins Engineering	Holden VP Commodore	Dick Johnson; Larry Perkins
1994	6	15 May	Winton Motor Raceway	Glenn Seton	Glenn Seton Racing	Ford EB Falcon	Glenn Seton; Glenn Seton
1994	7	5 June	Eastern Creek Raceway	Peter Brock	Holden Racing Team	Holden VP Commodore	Peter Brock; Peter Brock
1994	8	26 June	Mallala Motor Sport Park	Mark Skaife	Gibson Motorsport	Holden VP Commodore	Jim Richards; Mark Skaife
1994	9	3 July	Barbagallo Raceway	Alan Jones	Glenn Seton Racing	Ford EB Falcon	Tony Longhurst; Alan Jones
1994	10	24 July	Oran Park Raceway	Glenn Seton	Glenn Seton Racing	Ford EB Falcon	Glenn Seton; Glenn Seton
1995	1	5 February	Sandown Raceway	Larry Perkins	Perkins Engineering	Holden VR Commodore	Larry Perkins; John Bowe
1995	2	26 February	Symmons Plains Raceway	John Bowe	Dick Johnson Racing	Ford EF Falcon	John Bowe; Peter Brock
1995	3	12 March	Mount Panorama Circuit	John Bowe	Dick Johnson Racing	Ford EF Falcon	Dick Johnson; Mark Skaife
1995	4	9 April	Phillip Island Grand Prix Circuit	Glenn Seton	Glenn Seton Racing	Ford EF Falcon	Peter Brock; Glenn Seton
1995	5	23 April	Lakeside International Raceway	Glenn Seton	Glenn Seton Racing	Ford EF Falcon	John Bowe; Glenn Seton
1995	6	21 May	Winton Motor Raceway	John Bowe	Dick Johnson Racing	Ford EF Falcon	John Bowe; John Bowe
1995	7	28 May	Eastern Creek Raceway	Mark Skaife	Gibson Motorsport	Holden VR Commodore	Glenn Seton; Mark Skaife
1995	8	9 July	Mallala Motor Sport Park	Glenn Seton	Glenn Seton Racing	Ford EF Falcon	Glenn Seton; Glenn Seton
1995	9	16 July	Barbagallo Raceway	Glenn Seton	Glenn Seton Racing	Ford EF Falcon	Glenn Seton; Glenn Seton
1995	10	6 August	Oran Park Raceway	John Bowe	Dick Johnson Racing	Ford EF Falcon	John Bowe; John Bowe
1996	1	27 January	Eastern Creek Raceway	Craig Lowndes	Holden Racing Team	Holden VR Commodore	John Bowe; Craig Lowndes; Craig Lowndes
1996	2	4 February	Sandown Raceway	Craig Lowndes	Holden Racing Team	Holden VR Commodore	Craig Lowndes; John Bowe; Glenn Seton
1996	3	25 February	Mount Panorama Circuit	John Bowe	Dick Johnson Racing	Ford EF Falcon	John Bowe; John Bowe; John Bowe
1996	4	17 March	Symmons Plains Raceway	Craig Lowndes	Holden Racing Team	Holden VR Commodore	Craig Lowndes; Craig Lowndes; Craig Lowndes
1996	5	14 April	Phillip Island Grand Prix Circuit	Larry Perkins	Perkins Engineering	Holden VR Commodore	Craig Lowndes; Larry Perkins; Glenn Seton
1996	6	28 April	Calder Park Raceway	Russell Ingall	Perkins Engineering	Holden VR Commodore	Craig Lowndes; Russell Ingall; Glenn Seton
1996	7	5 May	Lakeside International Raceway	Craig Lowndes	Holden Racing Team	Holden VR Commodore	Craig Lowndes; Craig Lowndes; Craig Lowndes
1996	8	26 May	Barbagallo Raceway	Craig Lowndes	Holden Racing Team	Holden VR Commodore	Craig Lowndes; Craig Lowndes; Craig Lowndes
1996	9	2 June	Mallala Motor Sport Park	Craig Lowndes	Holden Racing Team	Holden VR Commodore	Craig Lowndes; Craig Lowndes; Wayne Gardner
1996	10	17 July	Oran Park Raceway	Peter Brock	Holden Racing Team	Holden VR Commodore	Peter Brock; Peter Brock; Peter Brock
1997	1	15 March	Calder Park Raceway	Wayne Gardner	Wayne Gardner Racing	Holden VS Commodore	Greg Murphy; Wayne Gardner; Glenn Seton
1997	2	13 April	Phillip Island Grand Prix Circuit	Russell Ingall	Perkins Engineering	Holden VS Commodore	Glenn Seton; Russell Ingall; Larry Perkins
1997	3	27 April	Sandown Raceway	Glenn Seton	Glenn Seton Racing	Ford EL Falcon	Glenn Seton; Glenn Seton; Glenn Seton
1997	4	4 May	Symmons Plains Raceway	Greg Murphy	Holden Racing Team	Holden VS Commodore	Peter Brock; Greg Murphy; Greg Murphy
1997	5	18 May	Winton Motor Raceway	Russell Ingall	Perkins Engineering	Holden VS Commodore	Larry Perkins; Russell Ingall; Russell Ingall
1997	6	25 May	Eastern Creek Raceway	Glenn Seton	Glenn Seton Racing	Ford EL Falcon	Glenn Seton; Glenn Seton; Glenn Seton
1997	7	15 June	Lakeside International Raceway	John Bowe	Dick Johnson Racing	Ford EL Falcon	Glenn Seton; John Bowe; Russell Ingall
1997	8	6 July	Barbagallo Raceway	Peter Brock	Holden Racing Team	Holden VS Commodore	Larry Perkins; John Bowe; Greg Murphy
1997	9	13 July	Mallala Motor Sport Park	Greg Murphy	Holden Racing Team	Holden VS Commodore	Greg Murphy; Greg Murphy; Larry Perkins
1997	10	3 August	Oran Park Raceway	Greg Murphy	Holden Racing Team	Holden VS Commodore	Peter Brock; Alan Jones; Glenn Seton
1998	1	1 February	Sandown Raceway	Craig Lowndes	Holden Racing Team	Holden VS Commodore	John Bowe; Craig Lowndes; Craig Lowndes
1998	2	8 February	Symmons Plains Raceway	Craig Lowndes	Holden Racing Team	Holden VS Commodore	Glenn Seton; Craig Lowndes; Craig Lowndes
1998	3	29 March	Lakeside International Raceway	Russell Ingall	Perkins Engineering	Holden VS Commodore	John Bowe; Russell Ingall; Russell Ingall
1998	4	19 April	Phillip Island Grand Prix Circuit	Craig Lowndes	Holden Racing Team	Holden VS Commodore	Mark Skaife; Craig Lowndes; Russell Ingall
1998	5	3 May	Winton Motor Raceway	John Bowe	Dick Johnson Racing	Ford EL Falcon	Russell Ingall; John Bowe; John Bowe
1998	6	24 May	Mallala Motor Sport Park	Russell Ingall	Perkins Engineering	Holden VS Commodore	John Bowe; Russell Ingall; Craig Lowndes
1998	7	31 May	Barbagallo Raceway	Craig Lowndes	Holden Racing Team	Holden VS Commodore	Craig Lowndes; Craig Lowndes; Craig Lowndes
1998	8	21 June	Calder Park Raceway	Craig Lowndes	Holden Racing Team	Holden VS Commodore	Craig Lowndes; Jason Bargwanna; Race 3 Cancelled
1998	9	19 July	Hidden Valley Raceway	Russell Ingall	Perkins Engineering	Holden VT Commodore	Craig Lowndes; Russell Ingall; Russell Ingall
1998	10	2 August	Oran Park Raceway	Craig Lowndes	Holden Racing Team	Holden VT Commodore	Craig Lowndes; Craig Lowndes; Craig Lowndes
1999	1	28 March	Eastern Creek Raceway	Mark Skaife	Holden Racing Team	Holden VT Commodore	Mark Skaife; Mark Skaife; Craig Lowndes
1999	2	10–11 April	Adelaide Street Circuit	Craig Lowndes	Holden Racing Team	Holden VT Commodore	
1999	3	1–2 May	Barbagallo Raceway	Craig Lowndes	Holden Racing Team	Holden VT Commodore	Craig Lowndes; Craig Lowndes; Craig Lowndes
1999	4	16 May	Phillip Island Grand Prix Circuit	Mark Skaife	Holden Racing Team	Holden VT Commodore	Mark Skaife; Mark Skaife; Craig Lowndes
1999	5	6 June	Hidden Valley Raceway	Jason Bright	Stone Brothers Racing	Ford AU Falcon	Russell Ingall; Russell Ingall; Jason Bright
1999	6	27 June	Sandown Raceway	Mark Skaife	Holden Racing Team	Holden VT Commodore	Mark Skaife; Mark Skaife; Craig Lowndes
1999	7	11 July	Queensland Raceway	Garth Tander	Garry Rogers Motorsport	Holden VS Commodore	Russell Ingall; Craig Lowndes; John Bowe
1999	8	25 July	Calder Park Raceway	Mark Skaife	Holden Racing Team	Holden VT Commodore	Craig Lowndes; Mark Skaife; Garth Tander
1999	9	8 August	Symmons Plains Raceway	Mark Skaife	Holden Racing Team	Holden VT Commodore	Greg Murphy; Mark Skaife; Mark Skaife
1999	10	22 August	Winton Motor Raceway	Jason Bargwanna	Garry Rogers Motorsport	Holden VT Commodore	Jason Bargwanna; Jason Bargwanna; Jason Bargwanna
1999	11	4 September	Oran Park Raceway	Mark Skaife	Holden Racing Team	Holden VT Commodore	Mark Skaife; Mark Skaife; Mark Skaife
1999	12	18 September	Queensland Raceway	Russell Ingall; Larry Perkins	Perkins Engineering	Holden VT Commodore	
1999	13	14 November	Mount Panorama Circuit	Steven Richards; Greg Murphy	Gibson Motorsport	Holden VT Commodore	

=== 2000s ===
Year	Round	Date	Circuit	Winner	Team	Car	Race winners
2000	1	12 February	Phillip Island Grand Prix Circuit	Garth Tander	Garry Rogers Motorsport	Holden VT Commodore	Craig Lowndes; Craig Baird
2000	2	18–19 March	Barbagallo Raceway	Craig Lowndes	Holden Racing Team	Holden VT Commodore	Craig Lowndes; Craig Lowndes; Craig Lowndes
2000	3	8–9 April	Adelaide Street Circuit	Garth Tander	Garry Rogers Motorsport	Holden VT Commodore	Craig Lowndes; Mark Skaife
2000	4	30 April	Eastern Creek Raceway	Mark Skaife	Holden Racing Team	Holden VT Commodore	Mark Skaife; Paul Radisich; Russell Ingall
2000	5	21 May	Hidden Valley Raceway	Mark Skaife	Holden Racing Team	Holden VT Commodore	Mark Skaife; Mark Skaife; Garth Tander
2000	6	10 June	Canberra Street Circuit	Steven Richards	Gibson Motorsport	Holden VT Commodore	Greg Murphy; Todd Kelly; Craig Lowndes
2000	7	2 July	Queensland Raceway	Craig Lowndes	Holden Racing Team	Holden VT Commodore	Craig Lowndes; Craig Lowndes; Craig Lowndes
2000	8	16 July	Winton Motor Raceway	Jason Bargwanna	Garry Rogers Motorsport	Holden VT Commodore	Garth Tander; Glenn Seton; Jason Bargwanna
2000	9	30 July	Oran Park Raceway	Mark Skaife	Holden Racing Team	Holden VT Commodore	Mark Skaife; Russell Ingall; Mark Skaife
2000	10	20 August	Calder Park Raceway	Steven Richards	Gibson Motorsport	Holden VT Commodore	Paul Radisich; Mark Larkham; Steven Richards
2000	11	10 September	Queensland Raceway	Craig Lowndes; Mark Skaife	Holden Racing Team	Holden VT Commodore	
2000	12	8 October	Sandown Raceway	Paul Radisich	Dick Johnson Racing	Ford AU Falcon	Paul Radisich; Steven Ellery; Paul Radisich
2000	13	19 November	Mount Panorama Circuit	Garth Tander; Jason Bargwanna	Garry Rogers Motorsport	Holden VT Commodore	
2001	1	25 March	Phillip Island Grand Prix Circuit	Mark Skaife	Holden Racing Team	Holden VX Commodore	Mark Skaife; Mark Skaife
2001	2	8–9 April	Adelaide Street Circuit	Jason Bright	Holden Racing Team	Holden VX Commodore	Craig Lowndes; Jason Bright
2001	3	30 April	Eastern Creek Raceway	Mark Skaife	Holden Racing Team	Holden VX Commodore	Greg Murphy; Mark Skaife
2001	4	12–13 May	Hidden Valley Raceway	Marcos Ambrose	Stone Brothers Racing	Ford AU Falcon	Russell Ingall; Greg Murphy; Mark Skaife
2001	5	9–10 June	Canberra Street Circuit	Steven Johnson	Dick Johnson Racing	Ford AU Falcon	Steven Johnson; Steven Richards; Mark Skaife
2001	6	23–24 June	Barbagallo Raceway	Paul Radisich	Dick Johnson Racing	Ford AU Falcon	Paul Radisich; Paul Radisich; Paul Radisich
2001	7	15 July	Calder Park Raceway	Paul Morris	Paul Morris Motorsport	Holden VT Commodore	Steven Johnson; Paul Morris; Paul Morris
2001	8	29 July	Oran Park Raceway	Mark Skaife	Holden Racing Team	Holden VX Commodore	Mark Skaife; Mark Skaife
2001	9	26 August	Queensland Raceway	Paul Radisich; Steven Johnson	Dick Johnson Racing	Ford AU Falcon	
2001	10	9 September	Winton Motor Raceway	Russell Ingall	Perkins Engineering	Holden VX Commodore	Greg Murphy; Russell Ingall
2001	11	7 October	Mount Panorama Circuit	Mark Skaife; Tony Longhurst	Holden Racing Team	Holden VX Commodore	
2001	12	10–11 November	Pukekohe Park Raceway	Greg Murphy	Kmart Racing Team	Holden VX Commodore	Greg Murphy; Greg Murphy; Greg Murphy
2001	13	1–2 December	Sandown Raceway	Todd Kelly	Kmart Racing Team	Holden VX Commodore	Mark Skaife; Todd Kelly; Craig Lowndes
2002	1	16–17 March	Adelaide Street Circuit	Mark Skaife	Holden Racing Team	Holden VX Commodore	Mark Skaife; Mark Skaife
2002	2	25 March	Phillip Island Grand Prix Circuit	Mark Skaife	Holden Racing Team	Holden VX Commodore	Marcos Ambrose; Mark Skaife
2002	3	27–28 April	Eastern Creek Raceway	Mark Skaife	Holden Racing Team	Holden VX Commodore	Mark Skaife; Mark Skaife; Mark Skaife
2002	4	18–19 May	Hidden Valley Raceway	Mark Skaife	Holden Racing Team	Holden VX Commodore	Jason Bright; Mark Skaife; Mark Skaife
2002	5	8–9 June	Canberra Street Circuit	Mark Skaife	Holden Racing Team	Holden VX Commodore	Mark Skaife; Russell Ingall; Mark Skaife
2002	6	29–30 June	Barbagallo Raceway	Jason Bright	Holden Racing Team	Holden VX Commodore	Mark Skaife; Greg Murphy; Jason Bright
2002	7	28 July	Oran Park Raceway	Mark Skaife	Holden Racing Team	Holden VX Commodore	Mark Skaife; Mark Skaife
2002	8	18 August	Winton Motor Raceway	Jason Bright	Holden Racing Team	Holden VX Commodore	Jason Bright; Jason Bright
2002	9	15 September	Queensland Raceway	David Besnard; Simon Wills	Stone Brothers Racing	Ford AU Falcon	
2002	10	13 October	Mount Panorama Circuit	Mark Skaife; Jim Richards	Holden Racing Team	Holden VX Commodore	
2002	11	26–27 October	Surfers Paradise Street Circuit	Jason Bargwanna	Garry Rogers Motorsport	Holden VX Commodore	Greg Murphy; Jason Bargwanna
2002	12	9–10 November	Pukekohe Park Raceway	Greg Murphy	Kmart Racing Team	Holden VX Commodore	Mark Skaife; Greg Murphy; Todd Kelly
2002	13	30 November–1 December	Sandown Raceway	Marcos Ambrose	Stone Brothers Racing	Ford AU Falcon	Marcos Ambrose; Marcos Ambrose
2003	1	21–22 March	Adelaide Street Circuit	Mark Skaife	Holden Racing Team	Holden VY Commodore	Marcos Ambrose; Mark Skaife
2003	2	25 March	Phillip Island Grand Prix Circuit	Craig Lowndes	Ford Performance Racing	Ford BA Falcon	
2003	3	4 May	Eastern Creek Raceway	Marcos Ambrose	Stone Brothers Racing	Ford BA Falcon	
2003	4	25 May	Winton Motor Raceway	Marcos Ambrose	Stone Brothers Racing	Ford BA Falcon	
2003	5	7–8 June	Barbagallo Raceway	Marcos Ambrose	Stone Brothers Racing	Ford BA Falcon	Greg Murphy; Mark Skaife; Marcos Ambrose
2003	6	28–29 June	Hidden Valley Raceway	Marcos Ambrose	Stone Brothers Racing	Ford BA Falcon	Mark Skaife; Marcos Ambrose; Marcos Ambrose
2003	7	20 July	Queensland Raceway	Russell Ingall	Stone Brothers Racing	Ford BA Falcon	
2003	8	17 August	Oran Park Raceway	Marcos Ambrose	Stone Brothers Racing	Ford BA Falcon	
2003	9	14 September	Sandown Raceway	Mark Skaife; Todd Kelly	Holden Racing Team	Holden VY Commodore	
2003	10	12 October	Mount Panorama Circuit	Greg Murphy; Rick Kelly	Kmart Racing Team	Holden VY Commodore	
2003	11	25–26 October	Surfers Paradise Street Circuit	Russell Ingall	Stone Brothers Racing	Ford BA Falcon	Russell Ingall; Russell Ingall
2003	12	8–9 November	Pukekohe Park Raceway	Greg Murphy	Kmart Racing Team	Holden VY Commodore	Greg Murphy; Greg Murphy; Mark Skaife
2003	13	29–30 November	Eastern Creek Raceway	Marcos Ambrose	Stone Brothers Racing	Ford BA Falcon	Marcos Ambrose; Marcos Ambrose
2004	1	20–21 March	Adelaide Street Circuit	Marcos Ambrose	Stone Brothers Racing	Ford BA Falcon	Marcos Ambrose; Marcos Ambrose
2004	2	4 April	Eastern Creek Raceway	Rick Kelly	Kmart Racing Team	Holden VY Commodore	
2004	3	2 May	Pukekohe Park Raceway	Jason Bright	Paul Weel Racing	Holden VY Commodore	Marcos Ambrose; Jason Bright; Jason Bright
2004	4	22–23 May	Hidden Valley Raceway	Todd Kelly	Holden Racing Team	Holden VY Commodore	Russell Ingall; Rick Kelly; Todd Kelly
2004	5	12–13 June	Barbagallo Raceway	Jason Bright	Paul Weel Racing	Holden VY Commodore	Mark Skaife; Jason Bright; Jason Bright
2004	6	4 July	Queensland Raceway	Marcos Ambrose	Stone Brothers Racing	Ford BA Falcon	
2004	7	25 July	Winton Motor Raceway	Cameron McConville	Garry Rogers Motorsport	Holden VY Commodore	
2004	8	15 August	Oran Park Raceway	Marcos Ambrose	Stone Brothers Racing	Ford BA Falcon	Mark Skaife; Marcos Ambrose
2004	9	12 September	Sandown Raceway	Marcos Ambrose; Greg Ritter	Stone Brothers Racing	Ford BA Falcon	
2004	10	10 October	Mount Panorama Circuit	Greg Murphy; Rick Kelly	Kmart Racing Team	Holden VY Commodore	
2004	11	25–26 October	Surfers Paradise Street Circuit	Greg Murphy	Kmart Racing Team	Holden VY Commodore	Marcos Ambrose; Greg Murphy
2004	12	13–14 November	Symmons Plains Raceway	Russell Ingall	Stone Brothers Racing	Ford BA Falcon	Rick Kelly; Marcos Ambrose; David Besnard
2004	13	4–5 December	Eastern Creek Raceway	Marcos Ambrose	Stone Brothers Racing	Ford BA Falcon	Marcos Ambrose; Marcos Ambrose; Marcos Ambrose
2005	1	19–20 March	Adelaide Street Circuit	Marcos Ambrose	Stone Brothers Racing	Ford BA Falcon	Marcos Ambrose; Marcos Ambrose
2005	2	16–17 April	Pukekohe Park Raceway	Greg Murphy	Paul Weel Racing	Holden VZ Commodore	Greg Murphy; Greg Murphy; Greg Murphy
2005	3	7–8 May	Barbagallo Raceway	Steven Richards	Perkins Engineering	Holden VY Commodore	Mark Skaife; Steven Richards; Russell Ingall
2005	4	29 May	Eastern Creek Raceway	Craig Lowndes	Triple Eight Race Engineering	Ford BA Falcon	Marcos Ambrose; Craig Lowndes
2005	5	11–12 June	Shanghai International Circuit	Todd Kelly	Holden Racing Team	Holden VZ Commodore	Todd Kelly; Mark Skaife; Todd Kelly
2005	6	2–3 July	Hidden Valley Raceway	Todd Kelly	Holden Racing Team	Holden VZ Commodore	Todd Kelly; Todd Kelly; Garth Tander
2005	7	24 July	Queensland Raceway	Craig Lowndes	Triple Eight Race Engineering	Ford BA Falcon	
2005	8	14 August	Oran Park Raceway	Russell Ingall	Stone Brothers Racing	Ford BA Falcon	Steven Richards; Russell Ingall
2005	9	11 September	Sandown Raceway	Craig Lowndes; Yvan Muller	Triple Eight Race Engineering	Ford BA Falcon	
2005	10	9 October	Mount Panorama Circuit	Mark Skaife; Todd Kelly	Holden Racing Team	Holden VZ Commodore	
2005	11	22–23 October	Surfers Paradise Street Circuit	Craig Lowndes	Triple Eight Race Engineering	Ford BA Falcon	Greg Murphy; Craig Lowndes; Craig Lowndes
2005	12	22–23 October	Symmons Plains Raceway	Garth Tander	HSV Dealer Team	Holden VZ Commodore	Garth Tander; Garth Tander; Garth Tander
2005	13	26–27 November	Phillip Island Grand Prix Circuit	Marcos Ambrose	Stone Brothers Racing	Ford BA Falcon	Craig Lowndes; Marcos Ambrose; Marcos Ambrose
2006	1	25–26 March	Adelaide Street Circuit	Jamie Whincup	Triple Eight Race Engineering	Ford BA Falcon	Craig Lowndes; Jamie Whincup
2006	2	22–23 April	Pukekohe Park Raceway	Mark Skaife	Holden Racing Team	Holden VZ Commodore	Mark Skaife; Garth Tander; Mark Skaife
2006	3	13–14 May	Barbagallo Raceway	Steven Richards	Perkins Engineering	Holden VZ Commodore	Mark Skaife; Dean Canto; Mark Skaife
2006	4	3–4 June	Winton Motor Raceway	Craig Lowndes	Triple Eight Race Engineering	Ford BA Falcon	Jason Bright; Jason Richards; Craig Lowndes
2006	5	1–2 July	Hidden Valley Raceway	Craig Lowndes	Triple Eight Race Engineering	Ford BA Falcon	Mark Skaife; Jason Bright; Craig Lowndes
2006	6	22–23 July	Queensland Raceway	Garth Tander	HSV Dealer Team	Holden VZ Commodore	Garth Tander; Mark Skaife; Garth Tander
2006	7	12–13 August	Oran Park Raceway	Craig Lowndes	Triple Eight Race Engineering	Ford BA Falcon	Todd Kelly; Mark Skaife; Craig Lowndes
2006	8	3 September	Sandown Raceway	Jason Bright; Mark Winterbottom	Ford Performance Racing	Ford BA Falcon	
2006	9	8 October	Mount Panorama Circuit	Craig Lowndes; Jamie Whincup	Triple Eight Race Engineering	Ford BA Falcon	
2006	10	21–22 October	Surfers Paradise Street Circuit	Todd Kelly	Holden Racing Team	Holden VZ Commodore	Todd Kelly; Garth Tander; Rick Kelly
2006	11	11–12 November	Symmons Plains Raceway	Garth Tander	HSV Dealer Team	Holden VZ Commodore	Jason Bright; Garth Tander; Garth Tander
2006	12	24–25 November	Bahrain International Circuit	Jason Bright	Ford Performance Racing	Ford BA Falcon	Jason Bright; Garth Tander; Todd Kelly
2006	13	9–10 December	Phillip Island Grand Prix Circuit	Todd Kelly	Holden Racing Team	Holden VZ Commodore	Todd Kelly; Todd Kelly; Mark Winterbottom
2007	1	3–4 March	Adelaide Street Circuit	Todd Kelly	Holden Racing Team	Holden VE Commodore	Todd Kelly; Rick Kelly
2007	2	24–25 March	Barbagallo Raceway	Garth Tander	HSV Dealer Team	Holden VE Commodore	Garth Tander; Garth Tander; Garth Tander
2007	3	21–22 April	Pukekohe Park Raceway	Rick Kelly	HSV Dealer Team	Holden VE Commodore	Garth Tander; Garth Tander; Rick Kelly
2007	4	19–20 May	Winton Motor Raceway	Jamie Whincup	Triple Eight Race Engineering	Ford BF Falcon	Jamie Whincup; Garth Tander; Garth Tander
2007	5	10–11 June	Eastern Creek Raceway	Mark Skaife	Holden Racing Team	Holden VE Commodore	Mark Skaife; Mark Skaife; Todd Kelly
2007	6	23–24 June	Hidden Valley Raceway	Craig Lowndes	Triple Eight Race Engineering	Ford BF Falcon	Mark Skaife; Craig Lowndes; Craig Lowndes
2007	7	22–23 July	Queensland Raceway	Garth Tander	HSV Dealer Team	Holden VE Commodore	Garth Tander; Garth Tander; Garth Tander
2007	8	18–19 August	Oran Park Raceway	Lee Holdsworth	Garry Rogers Motorsport	Holden VE Commodore	Mark Skaife; Craig Lowndes; Lee Holdsworth
2007	9	16 September	Sandown Raceway	Craig Lowndes; Jamie Whincup	Triple Eight Race Engineering	Ford BF Falcon	
2007	10	7 October	Mount Panorama Circuit	Craig Lowndes; Jamie Whincup	Triple Eight Race Engineering	Ford BF Falcon	
2007	11	20–21 October	Surfers Paradise Street Circuit	Garth Tander	HSV Dealer Team	Holden VE Commodore	Garth Tander; Garth Tander; Steven Richards
2007	12	2–3 November	Bahrain International Circuit	Mark Winterbottom	Ford Performance Racing	Ford BF Falcon	Mark Winterbottom; Mark Winterbottom; Craig Lowndes
2007	13	17–18 November	Symmons Plains Raceway	Jamie Whincup	Triple Eight Race Engineering	Ford BF Falcon	Garth Tander; Jamie Whincup; Jamie Whincup
2007	14	1–2 December	Phillip Island Grand Prix Circuit	Garth Tander	HSV Dealer Team	Holden VE Commodore	Garth Tander; Garth Tander; Todd Kelly
2008	1	23–24 February	Adelaide Street Circuit	Jamie Whincup	Triple Eight Race Engineering	Ford BF Falcon	Jamie Whincup; Jamie Whincup
2008	2	8–9 March	Eastern Creek Raceway	Will Davison	Dick Johnson Racing	Ford BF Falcon	Garth Tander; Will Davison; Mark Winterbottom
2008	3	19–20 April	Hamilton Street Circuit	Garth Tander	Holden Racing Team	Holden VE Commodore	Garth Tander; Garth Tander; Garth Tander
2008	4	10–11 May	Barbagallo Raceway	Mark Winterbottom	Ford Performance Racing	Ford BF Falcon	Mark Winterbottom; Mark Winterbottom; Mark Winterbottom
2008	5	8–9 June	Sandown Raceway	Jamie Whincup	Triple Eight Race Engineering	Ford BF Falcon	Jamie Whincup; Craig Lowndes; Jamie Whincup
2008	6	5–6 July	Hidden Valley Raceway	Steven Richards	Ford Performance Racing	Ford BF Falcon	Mark Winterbottom; Garth Tander; Steven Richards
2008	7	19–20 July	Queensland Raceway	Mark Winterbottom	Ford Performance Racing	Ford BF Falcon	James Courtney; Mark Winterbottom; Mark Winterbottom
2008	8	2–3 August	Winton Motor Raceway	Garth Tander	Holden Racing Team	Holden VE Commodore	Jamie Whincup; Will Davison; Garth Tander
2008	9	13–14 September	Phillip Island Grand Prix Circuit	Garth Tander; Mark Skaife	Holden Racing Team	Holden VE Commodore	
2008	10	11–12 October	Mount Panorama Circuit	Craig Lowndes; Jamie Whincup	Triple Eight Race Engineering	Ford BF Falcon	
2008	11	25–26 October	Surfers Paradise Street Circuit	Jamie Whincup	Triple Eight Race Engineering	Ford BF Falcon	Jamie Whincup; Jamie Whincup; Jamie Whincup
2008	12	7–8 November	Bahrain International Circuit	Jamie Whincup	Triple Eight Race Engineering	Ford BF Falcon	Jamie Whincup; Jamie Whincup; Jamie Whincup
2008	13	22–23 November	Symmons Plains Raceway	Jamie Whincup	Triple Eight Race Engineering	Ford BF Falcon	Todd Kelly; Jamie Whincup; Jamie Whincup
2008	14	6–7 December	Oran Park Raceway	Garth Tander	Holden Racing Team	Holden VE Commodore	Jamie Whincup; Garth Tander; Rick Kelly
Year	Race	Date	Circuit	Winner	Team	Car	
2009	1	21 March	Adelaide Street Circuit	Jamie Whincup	Triple Eight Race Engineering	Ford FG Falcon	
2009	2	22 March	Adelaide Street Circuit	Jamie Whincup	Triple Eight Race Engineering	Ford FG Falcon	
2009	3	18 April	Hamilton Street Circuit	Jamie Whincup	Triple Eight Race Engineering	Ford FG Falcon	
2009	4	19 April	Hamilton Street Circuit	Jamie Whincup	Triple Eight Race Engineering	Ford FG Falcon	
2009	5	2 May	Winton Motor Raceway	Craig Lowndes	Triple Eight Race Engineering	Ford FG Falcon	
2009	6	3 May	Winton Motor Raceway	Craig Lowndes	Triple Eight Race Engineering	Ford FG Falcon	
2009	7	30 May	Symmons Plains Raceway	Garth Tander	Holden Racing Team	Holden VE Commodore	
2009	8	31 May	Symmons Plains Raceway	Jamie Whincup	Triple Eight Race Engineering	Ford FG Falcon	
2009	9	20 June	Hidden Valley Raceway	Jamie Whincup	Triple Eight Race Engineering	Ford FG Falcon	
2009	10	21 June	Hidden Valley Raceway	Michael Caruso	Garry Rogers Motorsport	Holden VE Commodore	
2009	11	11 July	Reid Park Street Circuit	Jamie Whincup	Triple Eight Race Engineering	Ford FG Falcon	
2009	12	12 July	Reid Park Street Circuit	James Courtney	Dick Johnson Racing	Ford FG Falcon	
2009	13	1 August	Sandown Raceway	Will Davison	Holden Racing Team	Holden VE Commodore	
2009	14	2 August	Sandown Raceway	Garth Tander	Holden Racing Team	Holden VE Commodore	
2009	15	22 August	Queensland Raceway	Jamie Whincup	Triple Eight Race Engineering	Ford FG Falcon	
2009	16	23 August	Queensland Raceway	Will Davison	Holden Racing Team	Holden VE Commodore	
2009	17	13 September	Phillip Island Grand Prix Circuit	Garth Tander; Will Davison	Holden Racing Team	Holden VE Commodore	
2009	18	11 October	Mount Panorama Circuit	Garth Tander; Will Davison	Holden Racing Team	Holden VE Commodore	
2009	19	24 October	Surfers Paradise Street Circuit	Garth Tander	Holden Racing Team	Holden VE Commodore	
2009	20	25 October	Surfers Paradise Street Circuit	Mark Winterbottom	Ford Performance Racing	Ford FG Falcon	
2009	21	7 November	Phillip Island Grand Prix Circuit	Jamie Whincup	Triple Eight Race Engineering	Ford FG Falcon	
2009	22	8 November	Phillip Island Grand Prix Circuit	Jamie Whincup	Triple Eight Race Engineering	Ford FG Falcon	
2009	23	21 November	Barbagallo Raceway	Jamie Whincup	Triple Eight Race Engineering	Ford FG Falcon	
2009	24	22 November	Barbagallo Raceway	Craig Lowndes	Triple Eight Race Engineering	Ford FG Falcon	
2009	25	5 December	Homebush Street Circuit	Garth Tander	Holden Racing Team	Holden VE Commodore	
2009	26	6 December	Homebush Street Circuit	James Courtney	Dick Johnson Racing	Ford FG Falcon	

=== 2010s ===
Year	Race	Date	Circuit	Winner	Team	Car
2010	1	19 February	Yas Marina Circuit	Jamie Whincup	Triple Eight Race Engineering	Holden VE Commodore
2010	2	20 February	Yas Marina Circuit	Jamie Whincup	Triple Eight Race Engineering	Holden VE Commodore
2010	3	26 February	Bahrain International Circuit	Jamie Whincup	Triple Eight Race Engineering	Holden VE Commodore
2010	4	27 February	Bahrain International Circuit	Jamie Whincup	Triple Eight Race Engineering	Holden VE Commodore
2010	5	13 March	Adelaide Street Circuit	Garth Tander	Holden Racing Team	Holden VE Commodore
2010	6	14 March	Adelaide Street Circuit	Garth Tander	Holden Racing Team	Holden VE Commodore
2010	7	17 April	Hamilton Street Circuit	Jamie Whincup	Triple Eight Race Engineering	Holden VE Commodore
2010	8	18 April	Hamilton Street Circuit	Jamie Whincup	Triple Eight Race Engineering	Holden VE Commodore
2010	9	1 May	Queensland Raceway	James Courtney	Dick Johnson Racing	Ford FG Falcon
2010	10	2 May	Queensland Raceway	James Courtney	Dick Johnson Racing	Ford FG Falcon
2010	11	15 May	Winton Motor Raceway	James Courtney	Dick Johnson Racing	Ford FG Falcon
2010	12	16 May	Winton Motor Raceway	James Courtney	Dick Johnson Racing	Ford FG Falcon
2010	13	19 June	Hidden Valley Raceway	Mark Winterbottom	Ford Performance Racing	Ford FG Falcon
2010	14	20 June	Hidden Valley Raceway	Jamie Whincup	Triple Eight Race Engineering	Holden VE Commodore
2010	15	10 July	Reid Park Street Circuit	Jamie Whincup	Triple Eight Race Engineering	Holden VE Commodore
2010	16	11 July	Reid Park Street Circuit	Mark Winterbottom	Ford Performance Racing	Ford FG Falcon
2010	17	12 September	Phillip Island Grand Prix Circuit	Craig Lowndes; Mark Skaife	Triple Eight Race Engineering	Holden VE Commodore
2010	18	10 October	Mount Panorama Circuit	Craig Lowndes; Mark Skaife	Triple Eight Race Engineering	Holden VE Commodore
2010	19	23 October	Surfers Paradise Street Circuit	Garth Tander; Cameron McConville	Holden Racing Team	Holden VE Commodore
2010	20	24 October	Surfers Paradise Street Circuit	Jamie Whincup; Steve Owen	Triple Eight Race Engineering	Holden VE Commodore
2010	21	13 November	Symmons Plains Raceway	Craig Lowndes	Triple Eight Race Engineering	Holden VE Commodore
2010	22	14 November	Symmons Plains Raceway	Mark Winterbottom	Ford Performance Racing	Ford FG Falcon
2010	23	20 November	Sandown Raceway	Paul Dumbrell	Rod Nash Racing	Ford FG Falcon
2010	24	21 November	Sandown Raceway	James Courtney	Dick Johnson Racing	Ford FG Falcon
2010	25	4 December	Homebush Street Circuit	Jonathon Webb	Tekno Autosports	Ford FG Falcon
2010	26	5 December	Homebush Street Circuit	Lee Holdsworth	Garry Rogers Motorsport	Holden VE Commodore
2011	1	11 February	Yas Marina Circuit	Jamie Whincup	Triple Eight Race Engineering	Holden VE Commodore
2011	2	12 February	Yas Marina Circuit	James Courtney	Holden Racing Team	Holden VE Commodore
2011	3	19 March	Adelaide Street Circuit	Garth Tander	Holden Racing Team	Holden VE Commodore
2011	4	20 March	Adelaide Street Circuit	Jamie Whincup	Triple Eight Race Engineering	Holden VE Commodore
2011	5	16 April	Hamilton Street Circuit	Rick Kelly	Kelly Racing	Holden VE Commodore
2011	6	17 April	Hamilton Street Circuit	Shane van Gisbergen	Stone Brothers Racing	Ford FG Falcon
2011	7	30 April	Barbagallo Raceway	Jamie Whincup	Triple Eight Race Engineering	Holden VE Commodore
2011	8	1 May	Barbagallo Raceway	Jason Bright	Brad Jones Racing	Holden VE Commodore
2011	9	1 May	Barbagallo Raceway	Jamie Whincup	Triple Eight Race Engineering	Holden VE Commodore
2011	10	21 May	Winton Motor Raceway	Jamie Whincup	Triple Eight Race Engineering	Holden VE Commodore
2011	11	22 May	Winton Motor Raceway	Jason Bright	Brad Jones Racing	Holden VE Commodore
2011	12	18 June	Hidden Valley Raceway	Rick Kelly	Kelly Racing	Holden VE Commodore
2011	13	19 June	Hidden Valley Raceway	Shane van Gisbergen	Stone Brothers Racing	Ford FG Falcon
2011	14	9 July	Reid Park Street Circuit	Garth Tander	Holden Racing Team	Holden VE Commodore
2011	15	10 July	Reid Park Street Circuit	Jamie Whincup	Triple Eight Race Engineering	Holden VE Commodore
2011	16	20 August	Queensland Raceway	Craig Lowndes	Triple Eight Race Engineering	Holden VE Commodore
2011	17	20 August	Queensland Raceway	Craig Lowndes	Triple Eight Race Engineering	Holden VE Commodore
2011	18	21 August	Queensland Raceway	Craig Lowndes	Triple Eight Race Engineering	Holden VE Commodore
2011	19	18 September	Phillip Island Grand Prix Circuit	Craig Lowndes; Mark Skaife	Triple Eight Race Engineering	Holden VE Commodore
2011	20	9 October	Mount Panorama Circuit	Garth Tander; Nick Percat	Holden Racing Team	Holden VE Commodore
2011	21	22 October	Surfers Paradise Street Circuit	Jamie Whincup; Sébastien Bourdais	Triple Eight Race Engineering	Holden VE Commodore
2011	22	23 October	Surfers Paradise Street Circuit	Mark Winterbottom; Richard Lyons	Ford Performance Racing	Ford FG Falcon
2011	23	12 November	Symmons Plains Raceway	Jamie Whincup	Triple Eight Race Engineering	Holden VE Commodore
2011	24	13 November	Symmons Plains Raceway	Jamie Whincup	Triple Eight Race Engineering	Holden VE Commodore
2011	25	19 November	Sandown Raceway	Rick Kelly	Kelly Racing	Holden VE Commodore
2011	26	20 November	Sandown Raceway	Jamie Whincup	Triple Eight Race Engineering	Holden VE Commodore
2011	27	3 December	Homebush Street Circuit	Craig Lowndes	Triple Eight Race Engineering	Holden VE Commodore
2011	28	4 December	Homebush Street Circuit	Mark Winterbottom	Ford Performance Racing	Ford FG Falcon
2012	1	3 March	Adelaide Street Circuit	Jamie Whincup	Triple Eight Race Engineering	Holden VE Commodore
2012	2	4 March	Adelaide Street Circuit	Will Davison	Ford Performance Racing	Ford FG Falcon
2012	3	31 March	Symmons Plains Raceway	Will Davison	Ford Performance Racing	Ford FG Falcon
2012	4	1 April	Symmons Plains Raceway	Jamie Whincup	Triple Eight Race Engineering	Holden VE Commodore
2012	5	21 April	Hamilton Street Circuit	Will Davison	Ford Performance Racing	Ford FG Falcon
2012	6	22 April	Hamilton Street Circuit	Mark Winterbottom	Ford Performance Racing	Ford FG Falcon
2012	7	5 May	Barbagallo Raceway	Mark Winterbottom	Ford Performance Racing	Ford FG Falcon
2012	8	6 May	Barbagallo Raceway	Will Davison	Ford Performance Racing	Ford FG Falcon
2012	9	6 May	Barbagallo Raceway	Will Davison	Ford Performance Racing	Ford FG Falcon
2012	10	19 May	Phillip Island Grand Prix Circuit	Mark Winterbottom	Ford Performance Racing	Ford FG Falcon
2012	11	20 May	Phillip Island Grand Prix Circuit	Will Davison	Ford Performance Racing	Ford FG Falcon
2012	12	16 June	Hidden Valley Raceway	Jamie Whincup	Triple Eight Race Engineering	Holden VE Commodore
2012	13	17 June	Hidden Valley Raceway	Craig Lowndes	Triple Eight Race Engineering	Holden VE Commodore
2012	14	7 July	Reid Park Street Circuit	Jamie Whincup	Triple Eight Race Engineering	Holden VE Commodore
2012	15	8 July	Reid Park Street Circuit	Jamie Whincup	Triple Eight Race Engineering	Holden VE Commodore
2012	16	4 August	Queensland Raceway	Craig Lowndes	Triple Eight Race Engineering	Holden VE Commodore
2012	17	5 August	Queensland Raceway	Craig Lowndes	Triple Eight Race Engineering	Holden VE Commodore
2012	18	25 August	Sydney Motorsport Park	Craig Lowndes	Triple Eight Race Engineering	Holden VE Commodore
2012	19	26 August	Sydney Motorsport Park	Jamie Whincup	Triple Eight Race Engineering	Holden VE Commodore
2012	20	16 September	Sandown Raceway	Craig Lowndes; Warren Luff	Triple Eight Race Engineering	Holden VE Commodore
2012	21	7 October	Mount Panorama Circuit	Jamie Whincup; Paul Dumbrell	Triple Eight Race Engineering	Holden VE Commodore
2012	22	20 October	Surfers Paradise Street Circuit	Jamie Whincup; Sébastien Bourdais	Triple Eight Race Engineering	Holden VE Commodore
2012	23	21 October	Surfers Paradise Street Circuit	Will Davison; Mika Salo	Ford Performance Racing	Ford FG Falcon
2012	24	3 November	Yas Marina Circuit	Jamie Whincup	Triple Eight Race Engineering	Holden VE Commodore
2012	25	3 November	Yas Marina Circuit	Jamie Whincup	Triple Eight Race Engineering	Holden VE Commodore
2012	26	4 November	Yas Marina Circuit	Jamie Whincup	Triple Eight Race Engineering	Holden VE Commodore
2012	27	17 November	Winton Motor Raceway	Jamie Whincup	Triple Eight Race Engineering	Holden VE Commodore
2012	28	18 November	Winton Motor Raceway	Craig Lowndes	Triple Eight Race Engineering	Holden VE Commodore
2012	29	1 December	Homebush Street Circuit	Craig Lowndes	Triple Eight Race Engineering	Holden VE Commodore
2012	30	2 December	Homebush Street Circuit	Will Davison	Ford Performance Racing	Ford FG Falcon
2013	1	2 March	Adelaide Street Circuit	Craig Lowndes	Triple Eight Race Engineering	Holden VF Commodore
2013	2	3 March	Adelaide Street Circuit	Shane van Gisbergen	Tekno Autosports	Holden VF Commodore
2013	3	6 April	Symmons Plains Raceway	Fabian Coulthard	Brad Jones Racing	Holden VF Commodore
2013	4	7 April	Symmons Plains Raceway	Jason Bright	Brad Jones Racing	Holden VF Commodore
2013	5	7 April	Symmons Plains Raceway	Fabian Coulthard	Brad Jones Racing	Holden VF Commodore
2013	6	13 April	Pukekohe Park Raceway	Scott McLaughlin	Garry Rogers Motorsport	Holden VF Commodore
2013	7	13 April	Pukekohe Park Raceway	Jamie Whincup	Triple Eight Race Engineering	Holden VF Commodore
2013	8	14 April	Pukekohe Park Raceway	Will Davison	Ford Performance Racing	Ford FG Falcon
2013	9	14 April	Pukekohe Park Raceway	Jason Bright	Brad Jones Racing	Holden VF Commodore
2013	10	4 May	Barbagallo Raceway	Craig Lowndes	Triple Eight Race Engineering	Holden VF Commodore
2013	11	5 May	Barbagallo Raceway	Jamie Whincup	Triple Eight Race Engineering	Holden VF Commodore
2013	12	5 May	Barbagallo Raceway	Jamie Whincup	Triple Eight Race Engineering	Holden VF Commodore
2013	13	18 May	Circuit of the Americas	Jamie Whincup	Triple Eight Race Engineering	Holden VF Commodore
2013	14	18 May	Circuit of the Americas	Jamie Whincup	Triple Eight Race Engineering	Holden VF Commodore
2013	15	19 May	Circuit of the Americas	Fabian Coulthard	Brad Jones Racing	Holden VF Commodore
2013	16	19 May	Circuit of the Americas	Jamie Whincup	Triple Eight Race Engineering	Holden VF Commodore
2013	17	15 June	Hidden Valley Raceway	Jamie Whincup	Triple Eight Race Engineering	Holden VF Commodore
2013	18	16 June	Hidden Valley Raceway	Mark Winterbottom	Ford Performance Racing	Ford FG Falcon
2013	19	16 June	Hidden Valley Raceway	Craig Lowndes	Triple Eight Race Engineering	Holden VF Commodore
2013	20	6 July	Reid Park Street Circuit	Will Davison	Ford Performance Racing	Ford FG Falcon
2013	21	7 July	Reid Park Street Circuit	Garth Tander	Holden Racing Team	Holden VF Commodore
2013	22	27 July	Queensland Raceway	Jamie Whincup	Triple Eight Race Engineering	Holden VF Commodore
2013	23	28 July	Queensland Raceway	Scott McLaughlin	Garry Rogers Motorsport	Holden VF Commodore
2013	24	28 July	Queensland Raceway	Chaz Mostert	Dick Johnson Racing	Ford FG Falcon
2013	25	24 August	Winton Motor Raceway	James Moffat	Nissan Motorsport	Nissan L33 Altima
2013	26	25 August	Winton Motor Raceway	Mark Winterbottom	Ford Performance Racing	Ford FG Falcon
2013	27	25 August	Winton Motor Raceway	James Courtney	Holden Racing Team	Holden VF Commodore
2013	28	15 September	Sandown Raceway	Jamie Whincup; Paul Dumbrell	Triple Eight Race Engineering	Holden VF Commodore
2013	29	13 October	Mount Panorama Circuit	Mark Winterbottom; Steven Richards	Ford Performance Racing	Ford FG Falcon
2013	30	26 October	Surfers Paradise Street Circuit	Craig Lowndes; Warren Luff	Triple Eight Race Engineering	Holden VF Commodore
2013	31	27 October	Surfers Paradise Street Circuit	David Reynolds; Dean Canto	Rod Nash Racing	Ford FG Falcon
2013	32	23 November	Phillip Island Grand Prix Circuit	Garth Tander	Holden Racing Team	Holden VF Commodore
2013	33	24 November	Phillip Island Grand Prix Circuit	Craig Lowndes	Triple Eight Race Engineering	Holden VF Commodore
2013	34	24 November	Phillip Island Grand Prix Circuit	Jamie Whincup	Triple Eight Race Engineering	Holden VF Commodore
2013	35	7 December	Homebush Street Circuit	Jamie Whincup	Triple Eight Race Engineering	Holden VF Commodore
2013	36	8 December	Homebush Street Circuit	Shane van Gisbergen	Tekno Autosports	Holden VF Commodore
2014	1	8 March	Adelaide Street Circuit	Jamie Whincup	Triple Eight Race Engineering	Holden VF Commodore
2014	2	8 March	Adelaide Street Circuit	Craig Lowndes	Triple Eight Race Engineering	Holden VF Commodore
2014	3	9 March	Adelaide Street Circuit	James Courtney	Holden Racing Team	Holden VF Commodore
2014	4	29 March	Symmons Plains Raceway	Jamie Whincup	Triple Eight Race Engineering	Holden VF Commodore
2014	5	29 March	Symmons Plains Raceway	Jamie Whincup	Triple Eight Race Engineering	Holden VF Commodore
2014	6	30 March	Symmons Plains Raceway	Craig Lowndes	Triple Eight Race Engineering	Holden VF Commodore
2014	7	5 April	Winton Motor Raceway	Fabian Coulthard	Brad Jones Racing	Holden VF Commodore
2014	8	5 April	Winton Motor Raceway	Lee Holdsworth	Erebus Motorsport	Mercedes-Benz E63 AMG
2014	9	6 April	Winton Motor Raceway	Mark Winterbottom	Ford Performance Racing	Ford FG Falcon
2014	10	25 April	Pukekohe Park Raceway	Jason Bright	Brad Jones Racing	Holden VF Commodore
2014	11	26 April	Pukekohe Park Raceway	Mark Winterbottom	Ford Performance Racing	Ford FG Falcon
2014	12	26 April	Pukekohe Park Raceway	Shane van Gisbergen	Tekno Autosports	Holden VF Commodore
2014	13	27 April	Pukekohe Park Raceway	Mark Winterbottom	Ford Performance Racing	Ford FG Falcon
2014	14	17 May	Barbagallo Raceway	Scott McLaughlin	Garry Rogers Motorsport	Volvo S60
2014	15	17 May	Barbagallo Raceway	Craig Lowndes	Triple Eight Race Engineering	Holden VF Commodore
2014	16	18 May	Barbagallo Raceway	Chaz Mostert	Ford Performance Racing	Ford FG Falcon
2014	17	21 June	Hidden Valley Raceway	Jamie Whincup	Triple Eight Race Engineering	Holden VF Commodore
2014	18	21 June	Hidden Valley Raceway	Jamie Whincup	Triple Eight Race Engineering	Holden VF Commodore
2014	19	22 June	Hidden Valley Raceway	Mark Winterbottom	Ford Performance Racing	Ford FG Falcon
2014	20	5 July	Reid Park Street Circuit	Jamie Whincup	Triple Eight Race Engineering	Holden VF Commodore
2014	21	5 July	Reid Park Street Circuit	Garth Tander	Holden Racing Team	Holden VF Commodore
2014	22	6 July	Reid Park Street Circuit	Jamie Whincup	Triple Eight Race Engineering	Holden VF Commodore
2014	23	2 August	Queensland Raceway	Jamie Whincup	Triple Eight Race Engineering	Holden VF Commodore
2014	24	2 August	Queensland Raceway	Jamie Whincup	Triple Eight Race Engineering	Holden VF Commodore
2014	25	3 August	Queensland Raceway	James Courtney	Holden Racing Team	Holden VF Commodore
2014	26	23 August	Sydney Motorsport Park	Shane van Gisbergen	Tekno Autosports	Holden VF Commodore
2014	27	23 August	Sydney Motorsport Park	Shane van Gisbergen	Tekno Autosports	Holden VF Commodore
2014	28	24 August	Sydney Motorsport Park	Scott McLaughlin	Garry Rogers Motorsport	Volvo S60
2014	29	14 September	Sandown Raceway	Jamie Whincup; Paul Dumbrell	Triple Eight Race Engineering	Holden VF Commodore
2014	30	12 October	Mount Panorama Circuit	Chaz Mostert; Paul Morris	Ford Performance Racing	Ford FG Falcon
2014	31	25 October	Surfers Paradise Street Circuit	Shane van Gisbergen; Jonathon Webb	Tekno Autosports	Holden VF Commodore
2014	32	26 October	Surfers Paradise Street Circuit	Jamie Whincup; Paul Dumbrell	Triple Eight Race Engineering	Holden VF Commodore
2014	33	15 November	Phillip Island Grand Prix Circuit	Scott McLaughlin	Garry Rogers Motorsport	Volvo S60
2014	34	15 November	Phillip Island Grand Prix Circuit	Jamie Whincup	Triple Eight Race Engineering	Holden VF Commodore
2014	35	16 November	Phillip Island Grand Prix Circuit	Scott McLaughlin	Garry Rogers Motorsport	Volvo S60
2014	36	6 December	Homebush Street Circuit	Jamie Whincup	Triple Eight Race Engineering	Holden VF Commodore
2014	37	6 December	Homebush Street Circuit	Jamie Whincup	Triple Eight Race Engineering	Holden VF Commodore
2014	38	7 December	Homebush Street Circuit	Shane van Gisbergen	Tekno Autosports	Holden VF Commodore
2015	1	28 February	Adelaide Street Circuit	Jamie Whincup	Triple Eight Race Engineering	Holden VF Commodore
2015	2	28 February	Adelaide Street Circuit	Fabian Coulthard	Brad Jones Racing	Holden VF Commodore
2015	3	1 March	Adelaide Street Circuit	James Courtney	Holden Racing Team	Holden VF Commodore
2015	4	28 March	Symmons Plains Raceway	Craig Lowndes	Triple Eight Race Engineering	Holden VF Commodore
2015	5	28 March	Symmons Plains Raceway	Craig Lowndes	Triple Eight Race Engineering	Holden VF Commodore
2015	6	29 March	Symmons Plains Raceway	Jamie Whincup	Triple Eight Race Engineering	Holden VF Commodore
2015	7	2 May	Barbagallo Raceway	Mark Winterbottom	Prodrive Racing Australia	Ford FG X Falcon
2015	8	2 May	Barbagallo Raceway	Mark Winterbottom	Prodrive Racing Australia	Ford FG X Falcon
2015	9	3 May	Barbagallo Raceway	Will Davison	Erebus Motorsport	Mercedes-Benz E63 AMG
2015	10	16 May	Winton Motor Raceway	Chaz Mostert	Prodrive Racing Australia	Ford FG X Falcon
2015	11	16 May	Winton Motor Raceway	Mark Winterbottom	Prodrive Racing Australia	Ford FG X Falcon
2015	12	17 May	Winton Motor Raceway	Mark Winterbottom	Prodrive Racing Australia	Ford FG X Falcon
2015	13	20 June	Hidden Valley Raceway	Chaz Mostert	Prodrive Racing Australia	Ford FG X Falcon
2015	14	20 June	Hidden Valley Raceway	Craig Lowndes	Triple Eight Race Engineering	Holden VF Commodore
2015	15	21 June	Hidden Valley Raceway	David Reynolds	Rod Nash Racing	Ford FG X Falcon
2015	16	11 July	Reid Park Street Circuit	Mark Winterbottom	Prodrive Racing Australia	Ford FG X Falcon
2015	17	12 July	Reid Park Street Circuit	Mark Winterbottom	Prodrive Racing Australia	Ford FG X Falcon
2015	18	1 August	Queensland Raceway	Mark Winterbottom	Prodrive Racing Australia	Ford FG X Falcon
2015	19	1 August	Queensland Raceway	Mark Winterbottom	Prodrive Racing Australia	Ford FG X Falcon
2015	20	2 August	Queensland Raceway	Chaz Mostert	Prodrive Racing Australia	Ford FG X Falcon
2015	21	22 August	Sydney Motorsport Park	Chaz Mostert	Prodrive Racing Australia	Ford FG X Falcon
2015	22	22 August	Sydney Motorsport Park	Jamie Whincup	Triple Eight Race Engineering	Holden VF Commodore
2015	23	23 August	Sydney Motorsport Park	Chaz Mostert	Prodrive Racing Australia	Ford FG X Falcon
2015	24	13 September	Sandown Raceway	Mark Winterbottom; Steve Owen	Prodrive Racing Australia	Ford FG X Falcon
2015	25	11 October	Mount Panorama Circuit	Craig Lowndes; Steven Richards	Triple Eight Race Engineering	Holden VF Commodore
2015	26	24 October	Surfers Paradise Street Circuit	Shane van Gisbergen; Jonathon Webb	Tekno Autosports	Holden VF Commodore
2015	27	25 October	Surfers Paradise Street Circuit	James Courtney; Jack Perkins	Holden Racing Team	Holden VF Commodore
2015	28	7 November	Pukekohe Park Raceway	Jamie Whincup	Triple Eight Race Engineering	Holden VF Commodore
2015	29	7 November	Pukekohe Park Raceway	David Reynolds	Rod Nash Racing	Ford FG X Falcon
2015	30	8 November	Pukekohe Park Raceway	Jamie Whincup	Triple Eight Race Engineering	Holden VF Commodore
2015	31	21 November	Phillip Island Grand Prix Circuit	Craig Lowndes	Triple Eight Race Engineering	Holden VF Commodore
2015	32	21 November	Phillip Island Grand Prix Circuit	Jamie Whincup	Triple Eight Race Engineering	Holden VF Commodore
2015	33	22 November	Phillip Island Grand Prix Circuit	Craig Lowndes	Triple Eight Race Engineering	Holden VF Commodore
2015	34	5 December	Homebush Street Circuit	Jamie Whincup	Triple Eight Race Engineering	Holden VF Commodore
2015	35	5 December	Homebush Street Circuit	Jamie Whincup	Triple Eight Race Engineering	Holden VF Commodore
2015	36	6 December	Homebush Street Circuit	Shane van Gisbergen	Tekno Autosports	Holden VF Commodore
2016	1	5 March	Adelaide Street Circuit	Jamie Whincup	Triple Eight Race Engineering	Holden VF Commodore
2016	2	5 March	Adelaide Street Circuit	James Courtney	Holden Racing Team	Holden VF Commodore
2016	3	6 March	Adelaide Street Circuit	Nick Percat	Lucas Dumbrell Motorsport	Holden VF Commodore
2016	4	2 April	Symmons Plains Raceway	Shane van Gisbergen	Triple Eight Race Engineering	Holden VF Commodore
2016	5	3 April	Symmons Plains Raceway	Will Davison	Tekno Autosports	Holden VF Commodore
2016	6	16 April	Phillip Island Grand Prix Circuit	Scott McLaughlin	Garry Rogers Motorsport	Volvo S60
2016	7	17 April	Phillip Island Grand Prix Circuit	Scott McLaughlin	Garry Rogers Motorsport	Volvo S60
2016	8	7 May	Barbagallo Raceway	Craig Lowndes	Triple Eight Race Engineering	Holden VF Commodore
2016	9	8 May	Barbagallo Raceway	Mark Winterbottom	Prodrive Racing Australia	Ford FG X Falcon
2016	10	21 May	Winton Motor Raceway	Tim Slade	Brad Jones Racing	Holden VF Commodore
2016	11	22 May	Winton Motor Raceway	Tim Slade	Brad Jones Racing	Holden VF Commodore
2016	12	18 June	Hidden Valley Raceway	Michael Caruso	Nissan Motorsport	Nissan L33 Altima
2016	13	19 June	Hidden Valley Raceway	Shane van Gisbergen	Triple Eight Race Engineering	Holden VF Commodore
2016	14	9 July	Reid Park Street Circuit	Jamie Whincup	Triple Eight Race Engineering	Holden VF Commodore
2016	15	10 July	Reid Park Street Circuit	Shane van Gisbergen	Triple Eight Race Engineering	Holden VF Commodore
2016	16	23 July	Queensland Raceway	Shane van Gisbergen	Triple Eight Race Engineering	Holden VF Commodore
2016	17	24 July	Queensland Raceway	Craig Lowndes	Triple Eight Race Engineering	Holden VF Commodore
2016	18	27 August	Sydney Motorsport Park	Shane van Gisbergen	Triple Eight Race Engineering	Holden VF Commodore
2016	19	28 August	Sydney Motorsport Park	Jamie Whincup	Triple Eight Race Engineering	Holden VF Commodore
2016	20	18 September	Sandown Raceway	Garth Tander; Warren Luff	Holden Racing Team	Holden VF Commodore
2016	21	9 October	Mount Panorama Circuit	Will Davison; Jonathon Webb	Tekno Autosports	Holden VF Commodore
2016	22	22 October	Surfers Paradise Street Circuit	Shane van Gisbergen; Alexandre Prémat	Triple Eight Race Engineering	Holden VF Commodore
2016	23	23 October	Surfers Paradise Street Circuit	Jamie Whincup; Paul Dumbrell	Triple Eight Race Engineering	Holden VF Commodore
2016	24	5 November	Pukekohe Park Raceway	Jamie Whincup	Triple Eight Race Engineering	Holden VF Commodore
2016	25	5 November	Pukekohe Park Raceway	Shane van Gisbergen	Triple Eight Race Engineering	Holden VF Commodore
2016	26	6 November	Pukekohe Park Raceway	Mark Winterbottom	Prodrive Racing Australia	Ford FG X Falcon
2016	27	6 November	Pukekohe Park Raceway	Jamie Whincup	Triple Eight Race Engineering	Holden VF Commodore
2016	28	3 December	Homebush Street Circuit	Jamie Whincup	Triple Eight Race Engineering	Holden VF Commodore
2016	29	4 December	Homebush Street Circuit	Shane van Gisbergen	Triple Eight Race Engineering	Holden VF Commodore
2017	1	4 March	Adelaide Street Circuit	Shane van Gisbergen	Triple Eight Race Engineering	Holden VF Commodore
2017	2	5 March	Adelaide Street Circuit	Shane van Gisbergen	Triple Eight Race Engineering	Holden VF Commodore
2017	3	8 April	Symmons Plains Raceway	Shane van Gisbergen	Triple Eight Race Engineering	Holden VF Commodore
2017	4	9 April	Symmons Plains Raceway	Fabian Coulthard	DJR Team Penske	Ford FG X Falcon
2017	5	22 April	Phillip Island Grand Prix Circuit	Fabian Coulthard	DJR Team Penske	Ford FG X Falcon
2017	6	23 April	Phillip Island Grand Prix Circuit	Chaz Mostert	Rod Nash Racing	Ford FG X Falcon
2017	7	6 May	Barbagallo Raceway	Scott McLaughlin	DJR Team Penske	Ford FG X Falcon
2017	8	7 May	Barbagallo Raceway	Scott McLaughlin	DJR Team Penske	Ford FG X Falcon
2017	9	20 May	Winton Motor Raceway	Scott McLaughlin	DJR Team Penske	Ford FG X Falcon
2017	10	21 May	Winton Motor Raceway	Shane van Gisbergen	Triple Eight Race Engineering	Holden VF Commodore
2017	11	17 June	Hidden Valley Raceway	Fabian Coulthard	DJR Team Penske	Ford FG X Falcon
2017	12	18 June	Hidden Valley Raceway	Scott McLaughlin	DJR Team Penske	Ford FG X Falcon
2017	13	8 July	Reid Park Street Circuit	Scott McLaughlin	DJR Team Penske	Ford FG X Falcon
2017	14	9 July	Reid Park Street Circuit	Jamie Whincup	Triple Eight Race Engineering	Holden VF Commodore
2017	15	29 July	Queensland Raceway	Scott McLaughlin	DJR Team Penske	Ford FG X Falcon
2017	16	30 July	Queensland Raceway	Chaz Mostert	Rod Nash Racing	Ford FG X Falcon
2017	17	19 August	Sydney Motorsport Park	Fabian Coulthard	DJR Team Penske	Ford FG X Falcon
2017	18	20 August	Sydney Motorsport Park	Jamie Whincup	Triple Eight Race Engineering	Holden VF Commodore
2017	19	17 September	Sandown Raceway	Cameron Waters; Richie Stanaway	Prodrive Racing Australia	Ford FG X Falcon
2017	20	8 October	Mount Panorama Circuit	David Reynolds; Luke Youlden	Erebus Motorsport	Holden VF Commodore
2017	21	21 October	Surfers Paradise Street Circuit	Chaz Mostert; Steve Owen	Rod Nash Racing	Ford FG X Falcon
2017	22	22 October	Surfers Paradise Street Circuit	Scott McLaughlin; Alexandre Prémat	DJR Team Penske	Ford FG X Falcon
2017	23	4 November	Pukekohe Park Raceway	Shane van Gisbergen	Triple Eight Race Engineering	Holden VF Commodore
2017	24	5 November	Pukekohe Park Raceway	Jamie Whincup	Triple Eight Race Engineering	Holden VF Commodore
2017	25	25 November	Newcastle Street Circuit	Scott McLaughlin	DJR Team Penske	Ford FG X Falcon
2017	26	26 November	Newcastle Street Circuit	Jamie Whincup	Triple Eight Race Engineering	Holden VF Commodore
2018	1	3 March	Adelaide Street Circuit	Shane van Gisbergen	Triple Eight Race Engineering	Holden ZB Commodore
2018	2	4 March	Adelaide Street Circuit	Shane van Gisbergen	Triple Eight Race Engineering	Holden ZB Commodore
2018	3	23 March	Albert Park Circuit	Scott McLaughlin	DJR Team Penske	Ford FG X Falcon
2018	4	24 March	Albert Park Circuit	Jamie Whincup	Triple Eight Race Engineering	Holden ZB Commodore
2018	5	24 March	Albert Park Circuit	Scott Pye	Walkinshaw Andretti United	Holden ZB Commodore
2018	6	25 March	Albert Park Circuit	David Reynolds	Erebus Motorsport	Holden ZB Commodore
2018	7	7 April	Symmons Plains Raceway	Jamie Whincup	Triple Eight Race Engineering	Holden ZB Commodore
2018	8	8 April	Symmons Plains Raceway	Craig Lowndes	Triple Eight Race Engineering	Holden ZB Commodore
2018	9	21 April	Phillip Island Grand Prix Circuit	Scott McLaughlin	DJR Team Penske	Ford FG X Falcon
2018	10	22 April	Phillip Island Grand Prix Circuit	Scott McLaughlin	DJR Team Penske	Ford FG X Falcon
2018	11	5 May	Barbagallo Raceway	Scott McLaughlin	DJR Team Penske	Ford FG X Falcon
2018	12	6 May	Barbagallo Raceway	Scott McLaughlin	DJR Team Penske	Ford FG X Falcon
2018	13	19 May	Winton Motor Raceway	Rick Kelly	Nissan Motorsport	Nissan L33 Altima
2018	14	20 May	Winton Motor Raceway	Fabian Coulthard	DJR Team Penske	Ford FG X Falcon
2018	15	16 June	Hidden Valley Raceway	Scott McLaughlin	DJR Team Penske	Ford FG X Falcon
2018	16	17 June	Hidden Valley Raceway	David Reynolds	Erebus Motorsport	Holden ZB Commodore
2018	17	7 July	Reid Park Street Circuit	Jamie Whincup	Triple Eight Race Engineering	Holden ZB Commodore
2018	18	8 July	Reid Park Street Circuit	Shane van Gisbergen	Triple Eight Race Engineering	Holden ZB Commodore
2018	19	21 July	Queensland Raceway	Scott McLaughlin	DJR Team Penske	Ford FG X Falcon
2018	20	22 July	Queensland Raceway	Shane van Gisbergen	Triple Eight Race Engineering	Holden ZB Commodore
2018	21	4 August	Sydney Motorsport Park	Shane van Gisbergen	Triple Eight Race Engineering	Holden ZB Commodore
2018	22	25 August	The Bend Motorsport Park	Shane van Gisbergen	Triple Eight Race Engineering	Holden ZB Commodore
2018	23	26 August	The Bend Motorsport Park	Jamie Whincup	Triple Eight Race Engineering	Holden ZB Commodore
2018	24	16 September	Sandown Raceway	Jamie Whincup; Paul Dumbrell	Triple Eight Race Engineering	Holden ZB Commodore
2018	25	7 October	Mount Panorama Circuit	Craig Lowndes; Steven Richards	Triple Eight Race Engineering	Holden ZB Commodore
2018	26	20 October	Surfers Paradise Street Circuit	Chaz Mostert; James Moffat	Tickford Racing	Ford FG X Falcon
2018	27	21 October	Surfers Paradise Street Circuit	Abandoned		
2018	28	3 November	Pukekohe Park Raceway	Shane van Gisbergen	Triple Eight Race Engineering	Holden ZB Commodore
2018	29	4 November	Pukekohe Park Raceway	Scott McLaughlin	DJR Team Penske	Ford FG X Falcon
2018	30	24 November	Newcastle Street Circuit	Scott McLaughlin	DJR Team Penske	Ford FG X Falcon
2018	31	25 November	Newcastle Street Circuit	David Reynolds	Erebus Motorsport	Holden ZB Commodore
2019	1	2 March	Adelaide Street Circuit	Scott McLaughlin	DJR Team Penske	Ford Mustang GT
2019	2	3 March	Adelaide Street Circuit	Scott McLaughlin	DJR Team Penske	Ford Mustang GT
2019	3	15 March	Albert Park Circuit	Scott McLaughlin	DJR Team Penske	Ford Mustang GT
2019	4	16 March	Albert Park Circuit	Scott McLaughlin	DJR Team Penske	Ford Mustang GT
2019	5	16 March	Albert Park Circuit	Chaz Mostert	Tickford Racing	Ford Mustang GT
2019	6	17 March	Albert Park Circuit	Scott McLaughlin	DJR Team Penske	Ford Mustang GT
2019	7	6 April	Symmons Plains Raceway	Scott McLaughlin	DJR Team Penske	Ford Mustang GT
2019	8	7 April	Symmons Plains Raceway	Shane van Gisbergen	Triple Eight Race Engineering	Holden ZB Commodore
2019	9	13 April	Phillip Island Grand Prix Circuit	Scott McLaughlin	DJR Team Penske	Ford Mustang GT
2019	10	14 April	Phillip Island Grand Prix Circuit	Fabian Coulthard	DJR Team Penske	Ford Mustang GT
2019	11	3 May	Barbagallo Raceway	Fabian Coulthard	DJR Team Penske	Ford Mustang GT
2019	12	4 May	Barbagallo Raceway	Scott McLaughlin	DJR Team Penske	Ford Mustang GT
2019	13	25 May	Winton Motor Raceway	Scott McLaughlin	DJR Team Penske	Ford Mustang GT
2019	14	26 May	Winton Motor Raceway	Scott McLaughlin	DJR Team Penske	Ford Mustang GT
2019	15	15 June	Hidden Valley Raceway	Scott McLaughlin	DJR Team Penske	Ford Mustang GT
2019	16	16 May	Hidden Valley Raceway	Scott McLaughlin	DJR Team Penske	Ford Mustang GT
2019	17	6 July	Reid Park Street Circuit	Scott McLaughlin	DJR Team Penske	Ford Mustang GT
2019	18	7 July	Reid Park Street Circuit	Shane van Gisbergen	Triple Eight Race Engineering	Holden ZB Commodore
2019	19	27 July	Queensland Raceway	Jamie Whincup	Triple Eight Race Engineering	Holden ZB Commodore
2019	20	28 July	Queensland Raceway	Scott McLaughlin	DJR Team Penske	Ford Mustang GT
2019	21	24 August	The Bend Motorsport Park	Scott McLaughlin	DJR Team Penske	Ford Mustang GT
2019	22	25 August	The Bend Motorsport Park	Scott McLaughlin	DJR Team Penske	Ford Mustang GT
2019	23	14 September	Pukekohe Park Raceway	Shane van Gisbergen	Triple Eight Race Engineering	Holden ZB Commodore
2019	24	15 September	Pukekohe Park Raceway	Scott McLaughlin	DJR Team Penske	Ford Mustang GT
2019	25	13 October	Mount Panorama Circuit	Scott McLaughlin; Alexandre Prémat	DJR Team Penske	Ford Mustang GT
2019	26	26 October	Surfers Paradise Street Circuit	Jamie Whincup; Craig Lowndes	Triple Eight Race Engineering	Holden ZB Commodore
2019	27	27 October	Surfers Paradise Street Circuit	Shane van Gisbergen; Garth Tander	Triple Eight Race Engineering	Holden ZB Commodore
2019	28	9 November	Sandown Raceway	Craig Lowndes	Triple Eight Race Engineering	Holden ZB Commodore
2019	29	9 November	Sandown Raceway	Jamie Whincup	Triple Eight Race Engineering	Holden ZB Commodore
2019	30	10 November	Sandown Raceway	Jamie Whincup; Craig Lowndes	Triple Eight Race Engineering	Holden ZB Commodore
2019	31	23 November	Newcastle Street Circuit	Shane van Gisbergen	Triple Eight Race Engineering	Holden ZB Commodore
2019	32	24 November	Newcastle Street Circuit	Jamie Whincup	Triple Eight Race Engineering	Holden ZB Commodore

=== 2020s ===
Year	Race	Date	Circuit	Winner	Team	Car
2020	1	22 February	Adelaide Street Circuit	Jamie Whincup	Triple Eight Race Engineering	Holden ZB Commodore
2020	2	23 February	Adelaide Street Circuit	Scott McLaughlin	DJR Team Penske	Ford Mustang GT
2020	3	13 March	Albert Park Circuit	Event cancelled (Note: The races were cancelled, however the event had commenced with results counted from two qualifying sessions.)		
2020	4	13 March	Albert Park Circuit	Event cancelled		
2020	5	14 March	Albert Park Circuit	Event cancelled		
2020	6	15 March	Albert Park Circuit	Event cancelled		
2020	7	27 June	Sydney Motorsport Park	Scott McLaughlin	DJR Team Penske	Ford Mustang GT
2020	8	28 June	Sydney Motorsport Park	Nick Percat	Brad Jones Racing	Holden ZB Commodore
2020	9	28 June	Sydney Motorsport Park	Scott McLaughlin	DJR Team Penske	Ford Mustang GT
2020	10	18 July	Sydney Motorsport Park	Scott McLaughlin	DJR Team Penske	Ford Mustang GT
2020	11	19 July	Sydney Motorsport Park	Nick Percat	Brad Jones Racing	Holden ZB Commodore
2020	12	19 July	Sydney Motorsport Park	Jack Le Brocq	Tickford Racing	Ford Mustang GT
2020	13	15 August	Hidden Valley Raceway	Anton de Pasquale	Erebus Motorsport	Holden ZB Commodore
2020	14	16 August	Hidden Valley Raceway	Scott McLaughlin	DJR Team Penske	Ford Mustang GT
2020	15	16 August	Hidden Valley Raceway	Jamie Whincup	Triple Eight Race Engineering	Holden ZB Commodore
2020	16	22 August	Hidden Valley Raceway	Scott McLaughlin	DJR Team Penske	Ford Mustang GT
2020	17	23 August	Hidden Valley Raceway	Scott McLaughlin	DJR Team Penske	Ford Mustang GT
2020	18	23 August	Hidden Valley Raceway	Scott McLaughlin	DJR Team Penske	Ford Mustang GT
2020	19	29 August	Reid Park Street Circuit	Jamie Whincup	Triple Eight Race Engineering	Holden ZB Commodore
2020	20	30 August	Reid Park Street Circuit	Jamie Whincup	Triple Eight Race Engineering	Holden ZB Commodore
2020	21	30 August	Reid Park Street Circuit	Scott McLaughlin	DJR Team Penske	Ford Mustang GT
2020	22	5 September	Reid Park Street Circuit	Scott McLaughlin	DJR Team Penske	Ford Mustang GT
2020	23	6 September	Reid Park Street Circuit	Shane van Gisbergen	Triple Eight Race Engineering	Holden ZB Commodore
2020	24	6 September	Reid Park Street Circuit	Shane van Gisbergen	Triple Eight Race Engineering	Holden ZB Commodore
2020	25	19 September	The Bend Motorsport Park	Fabian Coulthard	DJR Team Penske	Ford Mustang GT
2020	26	20 September	The Bend Motorsport Park	Shane van Gisbergen	Triple Eight Race Engineering	Holden ZB Commodore
2020	27	20 September	The Bend Motorsport Park	Scott McLaughlin	DJR Team Penske	Ford Mustang GT
2020	28	26 September	The Bend Motorsport Park	Scott McLaughlin	DJR Team Penske	Ford Mustang GT
2020	29	27 September	The Bend Motorsport Park	Scott McLaughlin	DJR Team Penske	Ford Mustang GT
2020	30	27 September	The Bend Motorsport Park	Cameron Waters	Tickford Racing	Ford Mustang GT
2020	31	18 October	Mount Panorama Circuit	Shane van Gisbergen; Garth Tander	Triple Eight Race Engineering	Holden ZB Commodore
2021	1	27 February	Mount Panorama Circuit	Shane Van Gisbergen	Triple Eight Race Engineering	Holden ZB Commodore
2021	2	28 February	Mount Panorama Circuit	Shane Van Gisbergen	Triple Eight Race Engineering	Holden ZB Commodore
2021	3	20 March	Sandown Raceway	Shane Van Gisbergen	Triple Eight Race Engineering	Holden ZB Commodore
2021	4	21 March	Sandown Raceway	Shane Van Gisbergen	Triple Eight Race Engineering	Holden ZB Commodore
2021	5	21 March	Sandown Raceway	Shane Van Gisbergen	Triple Eight Race Engineering	Holden ZB Commodore
2021	6	17 April	Symmons Plains Raceway	Shane Van Gisbergen	Triple Eight Race Engineering	Holden ZB Commodore
2021	7	18 April	Symmons Plains Raceway	Jamie Whincup	Triple Eight Race Engineering	Holden ZB Commodore
2021	8	18 April	Symmons Plains Raceway	Chaz Mostert	Walkinshaw Andretti United	Holden ZB Commodore
2021	9	8 May	The Bend Motorsport Park	Andre Heimgartner	Kelly Grove Racing	Ford Mustang GT
2021	10	9 May	The Bend Motorsport Park	Anton de Pasquale	Dick Johnson Racing	Ford Mustang GT
2021	11	9 May	The Bend Motorsport Park	Cameron Waters	Tickford Racing	Ford Mustang GT
2021	12	19 June	Hidden Valley Raceway	Chaz Mostert	Walkinshaw Andretti United	Holden ZB Commodore
2021	13	20 June	Hidden Valley Raceway	Shane Van Gisbergen	Triple Eight Race Engineering	Holden ZB Commodore
2021	14	20 June	Hidden Valley Raceway	Shane Van Gisbergen	Triple Eight Race Engineering	Holden ZB Commodore
2021	15	10 July	Reid Park Street Circuit	Shane Van Gisbergen	Triple Eight Race Engineering	Holden ZB Commodore
2021	16	11 July	Reid Park Street Circuit	Shane Van Gisbergen	Triple Eight Race Engineering	Holden ZB Commodore
2021	17	17 July	Reid Park Street Circuit	Cameron Waters	Tickford Racing	Ford Mustang GT
2021	18	18 July	Reid Park Street Circuit	Shane van Gisbergen	Triple Eight Race Engineering	Holden ZB Commodore
2021	19	18 July	Reid Park Street Circuit	Cameron Waters	Tickford Racing	Ford Mustang GT
2021	20	30 October	Sydney Motorsport Park	Anton de Pasquale	Dick Johnson Racing	Ford Mustang GT
2021	21	31 October	Sydney Motorsport Park	Shane van Gisbergen	Triple Eight Race Engineering	Holden ZB Commodore
2021	22	31 October	Sydney Motorsport Park	Anton de Pasquale	Dick Johnson Racing	Ford Mustang GT
2021	23	6 November	Sydney Motorsport Park	Shane van Gisbergen	Triple Eight Race Engineering	Holden ZB Commodore
2021	24	7 November	Sydney Motorsport Park	Anton de Pasquale	Dick Johnson Racing	Ford Mustang GT
2021	25	7 November	Sydney Motorsport Park	Jamie Whincup	Triple Eight Race Engineering	Holden ZB Commodore
2021	26	13 November	Sydney Motorsport Park	Anton de Pasquale	Dick Johnson Racing	Ford Mustang GT
2021	27	14 November	Sydney Motorsport Park	Anton de Pasquale	Dick Johnson Racing	Ford Mustang GT
2021	28	14 November	Sydney Motorsport Park	Will Brown	Erebus Motorsport	Holden ZB Commodore
2021	29	20 November	Sydney Motorsport Park	Shane Van Gisbergen	Triple Eight Race Engineering	Holden ZB Commodore
2021	30	21 November	Sydney Motorsport Park	Abandoned		
2021	31	5 December	Mount Panorama Circuit	Chaz Mostert; Lee Holdsworth	Walkinshaw Andretti United	Holden ZB Commodore
2022	1	5 March	Sydney Motorsport Park	Shane Van Gisbergen	Triple Eight Race Engineering	Holden ZB Commodore
2022	2	6 March	Sydney Motorsport Park	Chaz Mostert	Walkinshaw Andretti United	Holden ZB Commodore
2022	3	26 March	Symmons Plains Raceway	Shane Van Gisbergen	Triple Eight Race Engineering	Holden ZB Commodore
2022	4	27 March	Symmons Plains Raceway	Shane Van Gisbergen	Triple Eight Race Engineering	Holden ZB Commodore
2022	5	27 March	Symmons Plains Raceway	Shane Van Gisbergen	Triple Eight Race Engineering	Holden ZB Commodore
2022	6	8 April	Albert Park Circuit	Chaz Mostert	Walkinshaw Andretti United	Holden ZB Commodore
2022	7	9 April	Albert Park Circuit	Shane Van Gisbergen	Triple Eight Race Engineering	Holden ZB Commodore
2022	8	9 April	Albert Park Circuit	Shane Van Gisbergen	Triple Eight Race Engineering	Holden ZB Commodore
2022	9	10 April	Albert Park Circuit	Chaz Mostert	Walkinshaw Andretti United	Holden ZB Commodore
2022	10	30 April	Wanneroo Raceway	Shane Van Gisbergen	Triple Eight Race Engineering	Holden ZB Commodore
2022	11	1 May	Wanneroo Raceway	Will Davison	Dick Johnson Racing	Ford Mustang GT
2022	12	1 May	Wanneroo Raceway	Shane Van Gisbergen	Triple Eight Race Engineering	Holden ZB Commodore
2022	13	21 May	Winton Motor Raceway	Cameron Waters	Tickford Racing	Ford Mustang GT
2022	14	22 May	Winton Motor Raceway	Shane Van Gisbergen	Triple Eight Race Engineering	Holden ZB Commodore
2022	15	22 May	Winton Motor Raceway	Cameron Waters	Tickford Racing	Ford Mustang GT
2022	16	18 June	Hidden Valley Raceway	Anton de Pasquale	Dick Johnson Racing	Ford Mustang GT
2022	17	19 May	Hidden Valley Raceway	Cameron Waters	Tickford Racing	Ford Mustang GT
2022	18	19 May	Hidden Valley Raceway	Chaz Mostert	Walkinshaw Andretti United	Holden ZB Commodore
2022	19	9 July	Reid Park Street Circuit	Shane Van Gisbergen	Triple Eight Race Engineering	Holden ZB Commodore
2022	20	10 July	Reid Park Street Circuit	Shane Van Gisbergen	Triple Eight Race Engineering	Holden ZB Commodore
2022	21	30 July	The Bend Motorsport Park	Shane Van Gisbergen	Triple Eight Race Engineering	Holden ZB Commodore
2022	22	31 July	The Bend Motorsport Park	Shane Van Gisbergen	Triple Eight Race Engineering	Holden ZB Commodore
2022	23	31 July	The Bend Motorsport Park	Shane Van Gisbergen	Triple Eight Race Engineering	Holden ZB Commodore
2022	24	20 August	Sandown Raceway	Will Davison	Dick Johnson Racing	Ford Mustang GT
2022	25	21 August	Sandown Raceway	Shane Van Gisbergen	Triple Eight Race Engineering	Holden ZB Commodore
2022	26	21 August	Sandown Raceway	Shane Van Gisbergen	Triple Eight Race Engineering	Holden ZB Commodore
2022	27	10 September	Pukekohe Park Raceway	Will Davison	Dick Johnson Racing	Ford Mustang GT
2022	28	11 September	Pukekohe Park Raceway	Shane Van Gisbergen	Triple Eight Race Engineering	Holden ZB Commodore
2022	29	11 September	Pukekohe Park Raceway	Shane Van Gisbergen	Triple Eight Race Engineering	Holden ZB Commodore
2022	30	9 October	Mount Panorama Circuit	Shane Van Gisbergen; Garth Tander	Triple Eight Race Engineering	Holden ZB Commodore
2022	31	29 October	Surfers Paradise Street Circuit	Shane van Gisbergen	Triple Eight Race Engineering	Holden ZB Commodore
2022	32	30 October	Surfers Paradise Street Circuit	Shane van Gisbergen	Triple Eight Race Engineering	Holden ZB Commodore
2022	33	3 December	Adelaide Street Circuit	Chaz Mostert	Walkinshaw Andretti United	Holden ZB Commodore
2022	34	4 December	Adelaide Street Circuit	Broc Feeney	Triple Eight Race Engineering	Holden ZB Commodore
2023	1	11 March	Newcastle Street Circuit	Cameron Waters	Tickford Racing	Ford Mustang GT
2023	2	12 March	Newcastle Street Circuit	Shane van Gisbergen	Triple Eight Race Engineering	Chevrolet Camaro ZL1-1LE
2023	3	30 March	Albert Park Circuit	Shane Van Gisbergen	Triple Eight Race Engineering	Chevrolet Camaro ZL1-1LE
2023	4	31 March	Albert Park Circuit	Brodie Kostecki	Erebus Motorsport	Chevrolet Camaro ZL1-1LE
2023	5	1 April	Albert Park Circuit	Brodie Kostecki	Erebus Motorsport	Chevrolet Camaro ZL1-1LE
2023	6	2 April	Albert Park Circuit	Broc Feeney	Triple Eight Race Engineering	Chevrolet Camaro ZL1-1LE
2023	7	29 April	Wanneroo Raceway	Shane Van Gisbergen	Triple Eight Race Engineering	Chevrolet Camaro ZL1-1LE
2023	8	30 April	Wanneroo Raceway	Will Brown	Erebus Motorsport	Chevrolet Camaro ZL1-1LE
2023	9	30 April	Wanneroo Raceway	Broc Feeney	Triple Eight Race Engineering	Chevrolet Camaro ZL1-1LE
2023	10	20 May	Symmons Plains Raceway	Will Brown	Erebus Motorsport	Chevrolet Camaro ZL1-1LE
2023	11	21 May	Symmons Plains Raceway	Broc Feeney	Triple Eight Race Engineering	Chevrolet Camaro ZL1-1LE
2023	12	21 May	Symmons Plains Raceway	Will Brown	Erebus Motorsport	Chevrolet Camaro ZL1-1LE
2023	13	17 June	Hidden Valley Raceway	Mark Winterbottom	Team 18	Chevrolet Camaro ZL1-1LE
2023	14	18 June	Hidden Valley Raceway	Broc Feeney	Triple Eight Race Engineering	Chevrolet Camaro ZL1-1LE
2023	15	18 June	Hidden Valley Raceway	Jack Le Brocq	Matt Stone Racing	Chevrolet Camaro ZL1-1LE
2023	16	8 July	Reid Park Street Circuit	Will Brown	Erebus Motorsport	Chevrolet Camaro ZL1-1LE
2023	17	9 July	Reid Park Street Circuit	Anton de Pasquale	Dick Johnson Racing	Ford Mustang GT
2023	18	29 July	Sydney Motorsport Park	Brodie Kostecki	Erebus Motorsport	Chevrolet Camaro ZL1-1LE
2023	19	30 July	Sydney Motorsport Park	Shane Van Gisbergen	Triple Eight Race Engineering	Chevrolet Camaro ZL1-1LE
2023	20	19 August	The Bend Motorsport Park	Brodie Kostecki	Erebus Motorsport	Chevrolet Camaro ZL1-1LE
2023	21	20 August	The Bend Motorsport Park	Brodie Kostecki	Erebus Motorsport	Chevrolet Camaro ZL1-1LE
2023	22	20 August	The Bend Motorsport Park	Brodie Kostecki	Erebus Motorsport	Chevrolet Camaro ZL1-1LE
2023	23	17 September	Sandown Raceway	Broc Feeney; Jamie Whincup	Triple Eight Race Engineering	Chevrolet Camaro ZL1-1LE
2023	24	8 October	Mount Panorama Circuit	Shane Van Gisbergen; Richie Stanaway	Triple Eight Race Engineering	Chevrolet Camaro ZL1-1LE
2023	25	28 October	Surfers Paradise Street Circuit	Cameron Waters	Tickford Racing	Ford Mustang GT
2023	26	29 October	Surfers Paradise Street Circuit	David Reynolds	Grove Racing	Ford Mustang GT
2023	27	25 November	Adelaide Street Circuit	Cameron Waters	Tickford Racing	Ford Mustang GT
2023	28	26 November	Adelaide Street Circuit	Matthew Payne	Grove Racing	Ford Mustang GT
2024	1	24 February	Mount Panorama Circuit	Broc Feeney	Triple Eight Race Engineering	Chevrolet Camaro ZL1-1LE
2024	2	25 February	Mount Panorama Circuit	Will Brown	Triple Eight Race Engineering	Chevrolet Camaro ZL1-1LE
2024	3	21 March	Albert Park Circuit	Broc Feeney	Triple Eight Race Engineering	Chevrolet Camaro ZL1-1LE
2024	4	22 March	Albert Park Circuit	Will Brown	Triple Eight Race Engineering	Chevrolet Camaro ZL1-1LE
2024	5	23 March	Albert Park Circuit	Broc Feeney	Triple Eight Race Engineering	Chevrolet Camaro ZL1-1LE
2024	6	24 March	Albert Park Circuit	Nick Percat	Matt Stone Racing	Chevrolet Camaro ZL1-1LE
2024	7	20 April	Taupo International Motorsport Park	Andre Heimgartner	Brad Jones Racing	Chevrolet Camaro ZL1-1LE
2024	8	21 April	Taupo International Motorsport Park	Will Brown	Triple Eight Race Engineering	Chevrolet Camaro ZL1-1LE
2024	9	18 May	Wanneroo Raceway	Chaz Mostert	Walkinshaw Andretti United	Ford Mustang GT
2024	10	19 May	Wanneroo Raceway	Cameron Waters	Tickford Racing	Ford Mustang GT
2024	11	15 June	Hidden Valley Raceway	Broc Feeney	Triple Eight Race Engineering	Chevrolet Camaro ZL1-1LE
2024	12	16 June	Hidden Valley Raceway	Broc Feeney	Triple Eight Race Engineering	Chevrolet Camaro ZL1-1LE
2024	13	6 July	Reid Park Street Circuit	Cameron Waters	Tickford Racing	Ford Mustang GT
2024	14	7 July	Reid Park Street Circuit	Matthew Payne	Grove Racing	Ford Mustang GT
2024	15	20 July	Sydney Motorsport Park	Chaz Mostert	Walkinshaw Andretti United	Ford Mustang GT
2024	16	21 July	Sydney Motorsport Park	Chaz Mostert	Walkinshaw Andretti United	Ford Mustang GT
2024	17	17 August	Symmons Plains Raceway	Nick Percat	Matt Stone Racing	Chevrolet Camaro ZL1-1LE
2024	18	18 August	Symmons Plains Raceway	Cameron Waters	Tickford Racing	Ford Mustang GT
2024	19	15 September	Sandown Raceway	Will Brown; Scott Pye	Triple Eight Race Engineering	Chevrolet Camaro ZL1-1LE
2024	20	13 October	Mount Panorama Circuit	Brodie Kostecki; Todd Hazelwood	Erebus Motorsport	Chevrolet Camaro ZL1-1LE
2024	21	26 October	Surfers Paradise Street Circuit	Cam Waters	Tickford Racing	Ford Mustang GT
2024	22	27 October	Surfers Paradise Street Circuit	Brodie Kostecki	Erebus Motorsport	Chevrolet Camaro ZL1-1LE
2024	23	16 November	Adelaide Street Circuit	Broc Feeney	Triple Eight Race Engineering	Chevrolet Camaro ZL1-1LE
2024	24	17 November	Adelaide Street Circuit	Will Brown	Triple Eight Race Engineering	Chevrolet Camaro ZL1-1LE
2025	1	21 February	Sydney Motorsport Park	Cameron Waters	Tickford Racing	Ford Mustang GT
2025	2	22 February	Sydney Motorsport Park	Cameron Waters	Tickford Racing	Ford Mustang GT
2025	3	23 February	Sydney Motorsport Park	Cameron Waters	Tickford Racing	Ford Mustang GT
2025	4	13 March	Albert Park Circuit	Broc Feeney	Triple Eight Race Engineering	Chevrolet Camaro ZL1-1LE
2025	5	14 March	Albert Park Circuit	Cameron Hill	Matt Stone Racing	Chevrolet Camaro ZL1-1LE
2025	6	15 March	Albert Park Circuit	Will Brown	Triple Eight Race Engineering	Chevrolet Camaro ZL1-1LE
2025	7	16 March	Albert Park Circuit	Abandoned		
2025	8	12 April	Taupo International Motorsport Park	Matthew Payne	Grove Racing	Ford Mustang GT
2025	9	12 April	Taupo International Motorsport Park	Chaz Mostert	Walkinshaw Andretti United	Ford Mustang GT
2025	10	13 April	Taupo International Motorsport Park	Matthew Payne	Grove Racing	Ford Mustang GT
2025	11	10 May	Symmons Plains Raceway	Broc Feeney	Triple Eight Race Engineering	Chevrolet Camaro ZL1-1LE
2025	12	10 May	Symmons Plains Raceway	Broc Feeney	Triple Eight Race Engineering	Chevrolet Camaro ZL1-1LE
2025	13	11 May	Symmons Plains Raceway	Matthew Payne	Grove Racing	Ford Mustang GT
2025	14	7 June	Wanneroo Raceway	Ryan Wood	Walkinshaw Andretti United	Ford Mustang GT
2025	15	7 June	Wanneroo Raceway	Broc Feeney	Triple Eight Race Engineering	Chevrolet Camaro ZL1-1LE
2025	16	8 June	Wanneroo Raceway	Broc Feeney	Triple Eight Race Engineering	Chevrolet Camaro ZL1-1LE
2025	17	21 June	Hidden Valley Raceway	Broc Feeney	Triple Eight Race Engineering	Chevrolet Camaro ZL1-1LE
2025	18	21 June	Hidden Valley Raceway	Broc Feeney	Triple Eight Race Engineering	Chevrolet Camaro ZL1-1LE
2025	19	22 June	Hidden Valley Raceway	Broc Feeney	Triple Eight Race Engineering	Chevrolet Camaro ZL1-1LE
2025	20	11 July	Reid Park Street Circuit	Brodie Kostecki	Dick Johnson Racing	Ford Mustang GT
2025	21	12 July	Reid Park Street Circuit	Broc Feeney	Triple Eight Race Engineering	Chevrolet Camaro ZL1-1LE
2025	22	13 July	Reid Park Street Circuit	Broc Feeney	Triple Eight Race Engineering	Chevrolet Camaro ZL1-1LE
2025	23	9 August	Queensland Raceway	Broc Feeney	Triple Eight Race Engineering	Chevrolet Camaro ZL1-1LE
2025	24	9 August	Queensland Raceway	Will Brown	Triple Eight Race Engineering	Chevrolet Camaro ZL1-1LE
2025	25	10 August	Queensland Raceway	Broc Feeney	Triple Eight Race Engineering	Chevrolet Camaro ZL1-1LE
2025	26	14 September	The Bend Motorsport Park	Brodie Kostecki; Todd Hazelwood	Dick Johnson Racing	Ford Mustang GT
2025	27	12 October	Mount Panorama Circuit	Matthew Payne; Garth Tander	Grove Racing	Ford Mustang GT
2025	28	25 October	Surfers Paradise Street Circuit	Chaz Mostert	Walkinshaw Andretti United	Ford Mustang GT
2025	29	26 October	Surfers Paradise Street Circuit	Chaz Mostert	Walkinshaw Andretti United	Ford Mustang GT
2025	30	15 November	Sandown Raceway	Chaz Mostert	Walkinshaw Andretti United	Ford Mustang GT
2025	31	16 November	Sandown Raceway	Broc Feeney	Triple Eight Race Engineering	Chevrolet Camaro ZL1-1LE
2025	32	28 November	Adelaide Street Circuit	Brodie Kostecki	Dick Johnson Racing	Ford Mustang GT
2025	33	29 November	Adelaide Street Circuit	Broc Feeney	Triple Eight Race Engineering	Chevrolet Camaro ZL1-1LE
2025	34	30 November	Adelaide Street Circuit	Matthew Payne	Grove Racing	Ford Mustang GT

== Statistics ==
=== Milestone rounds ===
Milestone	Year	Winner/s	Team	Car	Circuit	Ref.
1st round	1960	(Australia) David McKay	D McKay	Jaguar Mark 1	Gnoo Blas Motor Racing Circuit	
100th round	1980	(Australia) Kevin Bartlett	Nine Network Racing Team	Chevrolet Camaro Z28	Sandown Raceway	
200th round	1992	(Australia) John Bowe	Dick Johnson Racing	Ford Sierra RS500	Sandown Raceway	
300th round	2001	(Australia) Mark Skaife	Holden Racing Team	Holden VX Commodore	Oran Park Raceway	
400th round	2009	(Australia) Jamie Whincup	Triple Eight Race Engineering	Ford FG Falcon	Hamilton Street Circuit	
500th round	2016	(New Zealand) Scott McLaughlin	Garry Rogers Motorsport	Volvo S60	Phillip Island Grand Prix Circuit	
600th round	2023	(Australia) Brodie Kostecki	Erebus Motorsport	Chevrolet Camaro ZL1-1LE	The Bend Motorsport Park	

=== Milestone races ===
Milestone	Year	Winner/s	Team	Car	Circuit	Ref.
1st race	1960	(Australia) David McKay	D McKay	Jaguar Mark 1	Gnoo Blas Motor Racing Circuit	
100th race	1979	(Australia) Bob Morris	Ron Hodgson Motors	Holden LX Torana SS A9X	Sandown Raceway	
200th race	1990	(New Zealand) Jim Richards	Gibson Motorsport	Nissan Skyline HR31 GTS-R	Winton Motor Raceway	
300th race	1996	(Australia) Craig Lowndes	Holden Racing Team	Holden VR Commodore	Symmons Plains Raceway	
400th race	1999	(Australia) Mark Skaife	Holden Racing Team	Holden VT Commodore	Calder Park Raceway	
500th race	2002	(Australia) Mark Skaife	Holden Racing Team	Holden VX Commodore	Pukekohe Park Raceway	
600th race	2006	(Australia) Todd Kelly	Holden Racing Team	Holden VZ Commodore	Oran Park Raceway	
700th race	2009	(Australia) Michael Caruso	Garry Rogers Motorsport	Holden VE Commodore	Hidden Valley Raceway	
800th race	2012	(Australia) Will Davison	Ford Performance Racing	Ford FG Falcon	Homebush Street Circuit	
900th race	2015	(New Zealand) Shane van Gisbergen (Australia) Jonathon Webb	Tekno Autosports	Holden VF Commodore	Surfers Paradise Street Circuit	
1,000th race	2019	(New Zealand) Scott McLaughlin	DJR Team Penske	Ford Mustang GT	Albert Park Circuit	
1,100th race	2022	(New Zealand) Shane Van Gisbergen	Triple Eight Race Engineering	Holden ZB Commodore	Winton Motor Raceway	
1,200th race	2025	(Australia) Chaz Mostert	Walkinshaw Andretti United	Ford Mustang GT	Surfers Paradise Street Circuit	

=== Rounds by circuit ===
	Circuit	Rounds	Years
1	Sandown Raceway	55	1965, 1970–1974, 1976–1989, 1991–1992, 1994–2019, 2021–2025
2	Symmons Plains Raceway	52	1969–1999, 2004–2019, 2021–2025
3	Wanneroo Raceway	46	1973, 1978–2009, 2011–2019, 2022–2025
4	Oran Park Raceway	38	1971–2008
5	Mount Panorama Circuit	34	1966, 1969–1970, 1972, 1995–1996, 1999–2025

== See also ==
- Australian Touring Car Championship
- Supercars Championship
