= List of Australian Touring Car Championship circuits =

This is a list of circuits which have hosted a round of the Australian Touring Car Championship and the V8 Supercars Championship since the championship was first held at Gnoo Blas in Orange, New South Wales, in 1960.

The shortest track used in the championship was the 1.930 km (1.199 mi) Amaroo Park circuit located in the Sydney suburb of Annangrove. The longest track used was the Longford Circuit which measured 7.242 km (4.500 mi). Sandown Raceway in Melbourne has hosted the most rounds with 55.

Of the 36 circuits that have hosted rounds of the championship, eleven have been temporary street or airfield circuits with five still in use as of the 2026 season. Nine international circuits have also been used, four in New Zealand and one each in China, Bahrain, the United Arab Emirates and the United States.

== Championship circuits ==
Key
†	Current circuits (for the 2026 season)	*	Future and returning circuits (for the 2027 and 2028 seasons)

Unless stated, all tracks are located within Australia.
All circuit maps are as a track was when last used for a series race and may in some cases differ from another version used in earlier years.

Circuit	Location	Events held	Length	Seasons	Total rounds	Map
Adelaide International Raceway	Virginia, South Australia	Adelaide ATCC round	2.410 km (1.498 mi)	1972–1988 (Note: Adelaide International Raceway hosted two rounds in 1976 and 1977.)	19	
Adelaide Street Circuit^{†}	Adelaide, South Australia	Adelaide Grand Final	3.219 km (2.000 mi)	1999–2020, 2022–2025	26	
Albert Park Circuit^{†}	(Victoria (state)) Albert Park, Victoria	Melbourne SuperSprint	5.303 km (3.295 mi)	2018–2020, 2022–2026	8	
Amaroo Park	Annangrove, New South Wales	Amaroo Park ATCC round	1.930 km (1.199 mi)	1974–1978, 1985–1994	15	
Bahrain International Circuit	Sakhir, Bahrain	Desert 400	5.412 km (3.363 mi)	2006–2008, 2010	4	
Calder Park Raceway	(Victoria (state)) Keilor, Victoria	Calder Park V8 Supercar round	2.280 km (1.417 mi)	1969–1983, 1985–1988, 1996–2001	25	
Canberra Street Circuit	Canberra, Australian Capital Territory	Canberra 400	3.990 km (2.479 mi)	2000–2002	3	
Circuit of the Americas	Elroy, Texas, United States	Austin 400	3.792 km (2.356 mi)	2013	1	
Gnoo Blas Motor Racing Circuit	Orange, New South Wales		6.030 km (3.747 mi)	1960	1	
Hamilton Street Circuit	Hamilton, Waikato, New Zealand	Hamilton 400	3.310 km (2.057 mi)	2008–2012	5	
Hidden Valley Raceway^{†}	Darwin, Northern Territory	Darwin Triple Crown	2.870 km (1.783 mi)	1998–2026 (Note: Hidden Valley Raceway hosted two rounds in 2020.)	30	
Homebush Street Circuit	Sydney Olympic Park, New South Wales	Sydney 500	3.420 km (2.125 mi)	2009–2016	8	
Lakeside International Raceway	Brisbane, Queensland	Lakeside ATCC round	2.410 km (1.498 mi)	1964, 1967, 1970–1971, 1975–1998 (Note: Lakeside International Raceway hosted two rounds in 1991.)	29	
Longford Circuit	Longford, Tasmania		7.242 km (4.500 mi)	1962	1	
Lowood Airfield Circuit	Tarampa, Queensland		4.54 km (2.82 mi)	1961	1	
Mallala Motor Sport Park	Mallala, South Australia	Mallala ATCC round	2.601 km (1.616 mi)	1963, 1969–1971, 1989–1998	14	
Mount Panorama Circuit^{†}	Bathurst, New South Wales	Bathurst 1000; Mount Panorama 500	6.213 km (3.861 mi)	1966, 1969–1970, 1972, 1995–1996, 1999–2026 (Note: Mount Panorama Circuit hosted two rounds in 2021, and in 2024.)	35	
MotorMall Wanneroo Raceway^{†} (Barbagallo Raceway)	Pinjar, Western Australia	Perth Super 440	2.411 km (1.498 mi)	1973, 1978–2009, 2011–2019, 2022–2026	47	
Newcastle Street Circuit	Newcastle East, New South Wales	Newcastle 500	2.641 km (1.641 mi)	2017–2019, 2023	4	
Oran Park Raceway	Narellan, New South Wales	Oran Park V8 Supercar round	2.620 km (1.628 mi)	1971–2008	38	
Perth Park *	Perth, Western Australia	Perth SuperSprint	TBA		0	
Phillip Island Grand Prix Circuit *	(Victoria (state)) Phillip Island, Victoria	Phillip Island 500; Phillip Island SuperSprint	4.445 km (2.762 mi)	1976–1977, 1990, 1993–2003, 2005–2019 (Note: Phillip Island Grand Prix Circuit hosted two rounds in 2009.)	30	
Pukekohe Park Raceway	Pukekohe, Auckland Region, New Zealand	Auckland SuperSprint	2.910 km (1.808 mi)	2001–2007, 2013–2019, 2022	15	
Queensland Raceway^{†}	Ipswich, Queensland	Ipswich Super 440; Queensland 500	3.126 km (1.942 mi)	1999–2019, 2025–2026 (Note: Queensland Raceway hosted two rounds in 1999 and 2000.)	25	
Reid Park Street Circuit^{†}	Townsville, Queensland	Townsville 500	2.860 km (1.777 mi)	2009–2026 (Note: Reid Park Street Circuit hosted two rounds in 2020 and 2021.)	20	
Ruapuna Raceway^{†}	Christchurch, Canterbury, New Zealand	Christchurch Super 440	3.330 km (2.069 mi)	2026	1	
Sandown Raceway^{†}	(Victoria (state)) Springvale, Victoria	Sandown 500; Sandown SuperSprint	3.104 km (1.929 mi)	1965, 1970–1974, 1976–1989, 1991–1992, 1994–2019, 2021–2025 (Note: Sandown Raceway hosted two rounds in 1976 and 1977.)	55	
Shanghai International Circuit	Shanghai, China	V8 Supercars China Round	4.603 km (2.860 mi)	2005	1	
Surfers Paradise International Raceway	Surfers Paradise, Queensland	Surfers Paradise ATCC round	3.219 km (2.000 mi)	1969, 1971–1977, 1979–1987	17	
Surfers Paradise Street Circuit^{†}	Surfers Paradise, Queensland	V8 Supercar Challenge; Gold Coast 500	2.960 km (1.839 mi)	2002–2019, 2022–2026	22	
Sydney Motorsport Park^{†} (Eastern Creek Raceway)	Eastern Creek, New South Wales	Sydney 500	3.930 km (2.442 mi)	1992–1997, 1999–2005, 2007–2008, 2012, 2014–2018, 2020–2026 (Note: Sydney Motorsport Park hosted two rounds in 2003, 2004 and 2020, and hosted four rounds in 2021.)	34	
Symmons Plains Raceway^{†}	Launceston, Tasmania	Tasmania Super 440	2.411 km (1.498 mi)	1969–1999, 2004–2019, 2021–2026	53	
Taupo International Motorsport Park^{†}	Taupō, Waikato, New Zealand	Taupō Super 440	3.321 km (2.064 mi)	2024–2026	3	
The Bend Motorsport Park^{†}	Tailem Bend, South Australia	The Bend SuperSprint; The Bend 500	3.410 km (2.119 mi)	2018–2023, 2025–2026 (Note: The Bend Motorsport Park hosted two rounds in 2020.)	9	
Warwick Farm Raceway	Warwick Farm, New South Wales	Warwick Farm ATCC round	3.621 km (2.250 mi)	1968, 1970, 1972–1973	4	
Winton Motor Raceway	(Victoria (state)) Winton, Victoria	Winton SuperSprint	3.000 km (1.864 mi)	1985–1986, 1988–1995, 1997–2004, 2006–2019, 2022	33	
Yas Marina Circuit	Abu Dhabi, United Arab Emirates	Yas Marina Circuit V8 Supercar Event	5.554 km (3.451 mi)	2010–2012	3	

== Non-championship events ==
This section refers to non-championship events held in the Group 3A era of 1993 onwards.

Circuit	Location	Events held	Length	Years	Total	Map
Adelaide Street Circuit	Adelaide, South Australia	Supercars Challenge	3.780 km (2.349 mi)	1985–1995	3	
Albert Park Circuit	(Victoria (state)) Albert Park, Victoria	Supercars Challenge	5.303 km (3.295 mi)	1996–2006, 2008–2017	21	
Calder Park Raceway	(Victoria (state)) Keilor, Victoria	TAC Peter Brock Classic	2.280 km (1.417 mi)	1995	1	
Eastern Creek Raceway	Eastern Creek, New South Wales	Winfield Triple Challenge	3.930 km (2.442 mi)	1993–1995	3	
Kuala Lumpur Street Circuit	Kuala Lumpur, Malaysia	Kuala Lumpur City Grand Prix	3.305 km (2.054 mi)	2015	1	
Mount Panorama Circuit	Bathurst, New South Wales	Bathurst 1000; Primus/FAI 1000 Classic	6.213 km (3.861 mi)	1993–1998	6	
Pukekohe Park Raceway	Pukekohe, Auckland Region, New Zealand	Mobil 1 Sprints	2.820 km (1.752 mi)	1996	1	
Sandown Raceway	(Victoria (state)) Springvale, Victoria	Sandown 500	3.104 km (1.929 mi)	1993–1998	6	
Surfers Paradise Street Circuit	(Queensland) Surfers Paradise,Queenslan	V8 Supercar Challenge	4.470 km (2.778 mi)	1994, 1996–2001	7	
Wellington Street Circuit	Wellington, Wellington Region, New Zealand	Mobil 1 Sprints	3.230 km (2.007 mi)	1996	1	
