= Kuala Lumpur City Grand Prix =

Motor racing event

The Kuala Lumpur City Grand Prix (also known as the KL City Grand Prix) was a motor racing event held on the Kuala Lumpur Street Circuit in Kuala Lumpur, Malaysia. The track and event overlay was designed and delivered by Apex Circuit Design Ltd.

The event was first held in 2015, however was cancelled in subsequent years due to legal issues.

== Circuit ==
The 3.2 kilometre, 16 corner street circuit was based in the centre of Kuala Lumpur and passed several major landmarks including the Petronas Towers.

== History ==
The inaugural event was held from 7–9 August 2015. The event's main race, the KL GT City Cup was supported by championship rounds of the Lamborghini Super Trofeo Asia and Formula Masters China series, and an exhibition of five selected cars from the Supercars Championship from Australia. Legal action in Malaysia threatened the running of the 2016 event, and eventually led to the cancellation of the event. Supercars pledged they plan to honour their contract and race at the event in 2017 pending the resolution of the legal issues. However, due to ongoing issues the event did not appear on the series' 2017 calendar. Officials are currently in talks with the organisers to hold the event at Sepang International Circuit.

=== KL GT City Cup ===
The KL GT City Cup, a race for GT3 cars, was run as a forty-minute race on the Sunday of the 2015 event. The 2015 GT City Cup was won by Japanese driver Naoki Yokomizo. Local Malaysian driver Fairuz Fauzy finished second, but only after having been forced to borrow a car from the Lamborghini Super Trofeo series for the race, having badly damaged his Lamborghini Gallardo GT3 in qualifying.

==== Winners ====
Year	Driver	Car
2015	(Japan) Naoki Yokomizo	Lamborghini Huracán LP 620-2 Super Trofeo

=== Supercars ===
Prior to the first running of the event in 2015, Supercars announced they intended to hold a full championship round at the KL City Grand Prix from 2016 onwards. They then ran a demonstration event at the 2015 event, with only five cars featuring in an exhibition, one representing each of the five marques in the championship. It featured qualifying and then three short races, with the overall winner being Chaz Mostert for Prodrive Racing Australia. Following a positive response to the demonstration, the 2016 championship round was confirmed in September 2015 with the announcement of the calendar for the 2016 season.

In June 2016, the event was cancelled due to the legal issues surrounding the event. The series has investigated moving the championship round to the nearby Sepang International Circuit, but this failed to eventuate for 2016 or 2017, leaving a gap in the series calendar. The championship round was to have been known as the KL City 400 and was to follow the International Super Sprint format, which consisted of four 100 km races across the weekend. The South East Asia Formula 4 was also due to support the event. The event was to become the series' only event outside Australia and New Zealand, and the fourth event in the series' history in Asia; following an event at the Shanghai International Circuit in China in 2005, the Desert 400 in Bahrain from 2006 to 2010 and the Yas V8 400 in the United Arab Emirates from 2010 to 2012.
