= Tony Cochrane =

Australian businessman

Tony Cochrane AM
- Cochrane in 2025

Chairman of the Gold Coast Suns
- In office 27 March 2016 – 19 March 2023
- Preceded by: John Witheriff
- Succeeded by: Bob East

Personal details
- Born: Anthony John Cochrane

Anthony John Cochrane AM is an Australian businessman, best known for event promotion and sports administration.

Cochrane was appointed a Member of the Order of Australia in the 2021 Queen's Birthday Honours.

== Event promotion ==
Cochrane has been involved in event promotion since the 1970s, and has promoted or produced tours for several international and local artists, including The Rolling Stones, Sammy Davis Jr., Placido Domingo and The Main Event Tour featuring John Farnham, Olivia Newton-John and Anthony Warlow. Cochrane once spent a week sleeping on Frank Sinatra's floor in order to convince him to return to tour Australia, despite previously vowing he never would.

Cochrane's theatre credits include Grease: The Arena Spectacular and Australian productions of musicals including The Sound of Music, Annie and Hairspray, for which he and his fellow producers won a Tony Award. He also collected ARIA's for Platinum albums. He is the global Chairman of IWEFO, International World Exhibition and Festival Organization. In 2012, Cochrane and his wife Thea founded International Events Consulting, best known for developing and touring Exhibitionism: The Rolling Stones Exhibit globally. The company entered administration in December 2020. Cochrane remained a director of Cochrane Entertainment, a company he also co-founded.

== Sports administration ==
In 1996, Cochrane and three other investors purchased the promotion rights for the Australian Touring Car Championship from IMG for $52,000. In 1997, the series was renamed to V8 Supercars, and expanded to be valued at $330 million when a stake of the sport was sold to Archer Capital in 2011. In 2012, Cochrane retired from his role as executive chairman of V8 Supercars. Cochrane was added to the V8 Supercars Hall of Fame in 2012, becoming the first person to be inducted having not raced in the championship.

In March 2014, Cochrane joined the board of the Gold Coast Suns in the Australian Football League (AFL). He was elected as the club's chairman in December 2015 and officially took over from John Witheriff in the role on 27 March 2016.

In his time as chairman he maintained his reputation for being outspoken and uncompromising, particularly in his relationship with the media. His blunt style has even seen him described as the Donald Trump of the AFL. He announced in February 2023 that he would resign as chairman after round 1 of the 2023 AFL season and was replaced by Bob East.

In 2021, SX Global, with Cochrane as president, became promoters of the new FIM Supercross World Championship.
