= V8 Supercars China Round =

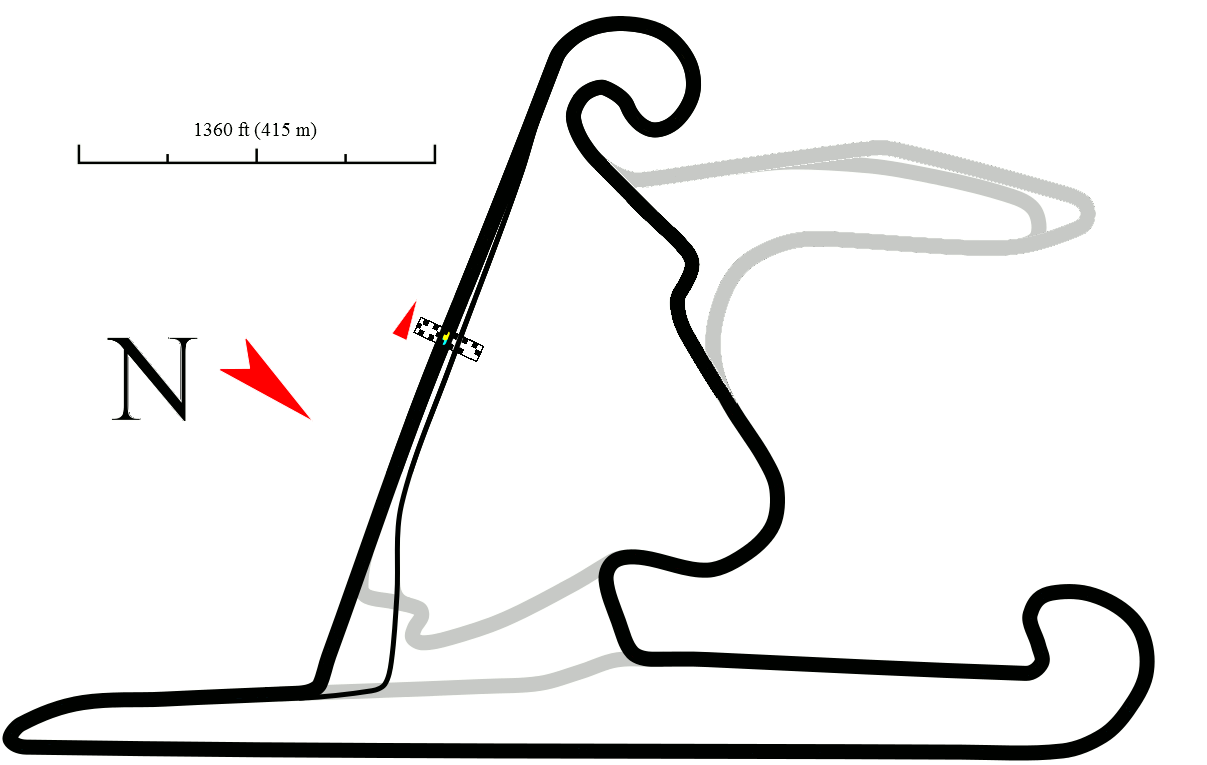
- Race Information
Venue	Shanghai International Circuit
Number of times held	1
First held	2005
Last held	2005
- Race Format
- Race 1
Laps	22
Distance	100 km
- Race 2
Laps	30
Distance	140 km
- Race 3
Laps	30
Distance	140 km
- Last Event (2005)
- Overall Winner
(Australia) Todd Kelly	Holden Racing Team
- Race Winners
(Australia) Todd Kelly	Holden Racing Team
(Australia) Mark Skaife	Holden Racing Team
(Australia) Todd Kelly	Holden Racing Team

The V8 Supercars China Round (formally known as the Buick V8 Supercars China Round) was a motor racing event for V8 Supercars that took place at the Shanghai International Circuit in Shanghai, China, in 2005.

== History ==
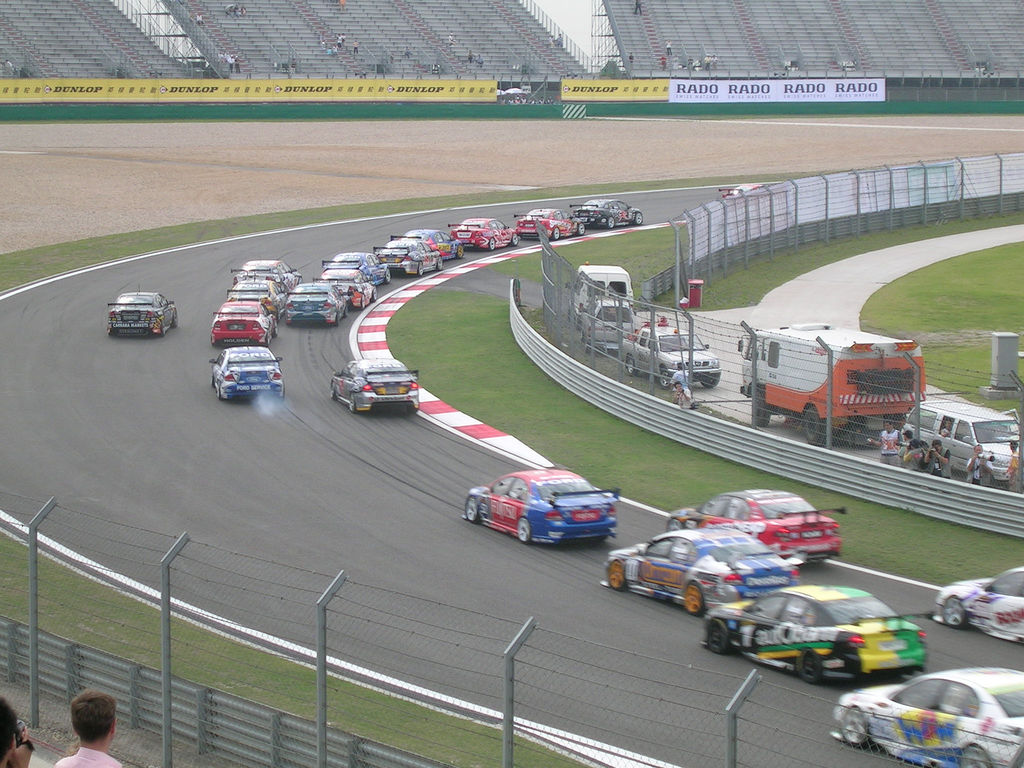
Race start in Shanghai.

The China Round was announced, initially for a 2004 date, by series chairman Tony Cochrane in early 2003, signalling the first time that V8 Supercars would race outside Australia and New Zealand. The event was eventually confirmed for June 2005, with several teams updating their liveries for the weekend, including the HSV Dealer Team entry of Rick Kelly rebranding as Team Buick for the weekend.

The race weekend itself was dominated by the Holden Racing Team, with Todd Kelly winning two of the three races, and the round, and team-mate Mark Skaife winning the other race. It was also a record fiftieth round victory for the team. In the opening race of the weekend, Mark Winterbottom hit a loose drain cover which ripped the bottom out of the chassis and ruled him out for the final two races. It was an incident which was later repeated at the 2005 Chinese Grand Prix.

While the event initially appeared on the 2006 calendar, the proposed dates were rejected by Chinese officials and the event was replaced by a round at Winton Motor Raceway. The 2006 calendar also featured another the series' second venture outside Australasia with the introduction of the Desert 400 in Bahrain.

== Winners ==
Year	Driver	Team	Car	Report
2005	(Australia) Todd Kelly	Holden Racing Team	Holden VZ Commodore	

== Event sponsors ==
- 2005: Buick

== See also ==
- List of Australian Touring Car Championship races
