= Kuala Lumpur Street Circuit =

Motorsport circuit in Kuala Lumpur, Malaysia

- Location: Kuala Lumpur
- Coordinates: 3°09′30″N 101°42′38″E
- Opened: 7 August 2015
- Closed: 9 August 2015
- Major events: KL GT City Cup; V8 Supercars; Lamborghini Super Trofeo Asia; Formula Masters China
- Length: 3.305 km (2.054 mi)
- Turns: 16
- Race lap record: 1:25.279 (Todd Kelly, Nissan Altima L33, 2015, V8 Supercars)

The Kuala Lumpur Street Circuit was a temporary street circuit located in Kuala Lumpur, Malaysia. The track hosted the 2015 Kuala Lumpur City Grand Prix for several categories and was contracted to host Supercars from 2017 to 2019. Ongoing legal issues have cancelled subsequent events at the circuit.

== Layout ==
The 3.305 km (2.054 mi) winded through central Kuala Lumpur and was designed to showcase the city to the world via television broadcasts of the event. It passed several major landmarks, including the Petronas Towers, Menara KL and Suria KLCC. One of the major overtaking spots was on Jalan Ampang, one of the main roads in Kuala Lumpur.

The initial reaction to the circuit was positive; however, the drivers visiting from the V8 Supercars series noted the track's difficulty. Chaz Mostert described the circuit as like one from a video game, while Todd Kelly described the track as the "craziest" street circuit he had ever been to. Meanwhile, other drivers cited the circuit's bumps, narrow width, and camber changes as providing a unique challenge.

The FIA Grade 3 circuit was designed by Apex Circuit Designs, who have previously designed and redeveloped a range of circuits including Dubai Autodrome, Hampton Downs and a street circuit in Bangkok, Thailand.

== History ==
The Kuala Lumpur Street Circuit was opened in August 2015 to host the Kuala Lumpur City Grand Prix. The inaugural event included a variety of action, ranging from GT3 cars in the form of a flagship GT race, the KL GT City Cup, and the Lamborghini Super Trofeo Asia, to open wheelers in the form of Formula Masters China and a touring car demonstration in the form of five cars from the International V8 Supercars Championship. Starting in 2016, the event was due to host a full championship round of V8 Supercars. The 2016 event was later cancelled due to legal issues, which remained unresolved as of 2017.

== Lap records ==
Class	Driver	Vehicle	Time	Date
Outright	(Australia) Todd Kelly	Nissan Altima L33	1:25.279	9 August 2015
Touring Cars
V8 Supercar	(Australia) Todd Kelly	Nissan Altima L33	1:25.279	9 August 2015
Sports Cars
Lamborghini Super Trofeo Asia	(Japan) Kazuki Hiramine	Lamborghini Huracán LP 620-2 Super Trofeo	1:25.387	8 August 2015
Open-Wheel Cars
Formula Masters China	(Japan) Shota Kiyohara	Tatuus FA010	1:27.002	9 August 2015
