= Supercars Championship =

Touring car racing category in Australasia

- Category: Touring car racing
- Country: Australia; New Zealand
- Inaugural season: 1997
- Drivers: 24
- Teams: 11
- Constructors: (United States) Ford; (United States) Chevrolet; (Japan) Toyota
- Tyre suppliers: Dunlop
- Drivers' champion: (Australia) Chaz Mostert
- Makes' champion: (United States) Ford
- Teams' champion: Triple Eight Race Engineering
- Official website: www.supercars.com

The Supercars Championship, also known as the Repco Supercars Championship under sponsorship and historically as V8 Supercars & Australian Touring Car Championship, is a touring car racing category in Australia and New Zealand, running as an International Series under Fédération Internationale de l'Automobile (FIA) regulations, governing the sport.

Supercars events take place in all Australian states and the Northern Territory, with the Australian Capital Territory formerly holding the Canberra 400. Usually, an international round is held in New Zealand, with events previously being held in China, Bahrain, the United Arab Emirates, and the United States. The Melbourne SuperSprint championship event is also held in support of the Australian Grand Prix. Race formats vary between each event, with sprint races between 100 and 200 kilometres (62 and 124 mi) in length, street races between 125 and 250 kilometres (78 and 155 mi) in length, and two-driver endurance races held at The Bend 500 and Bathurst. The series is broadcast in 137 countries and has an average event attendance of over 100,000. With over 285,000 in attendance annually, the Adelaide Grand Final is the most attended Supercars race in Australia.

The vehicles used in the series are loosely based on road-going cars. Cars are custom made using a control chassis, with only certain body panels being common between the road cars and race cars. The cars are controlled for "technical parity" - ensuring that teams and drivers using any of the homologated cars have a chance to build and drive a winning car.

All cars use bespoke, race prepped variants of current engines supplied by GM, Ford and Toyota. A 5.4L variant of the Ford Coyote DOHC V8 engine powering the Mustang and a 5.7L variant of the GM LTR pushrod V8 engine powering the Camaro. Toyota provides a bespoke 5.2L variant of its 2UR-GSE DOHC V8 engine for the Toyota Supra.

Originally only for Ford Falcons and Holden Commodores, the new generation V8 Supercar regulations, introduced in 2013, opened up the series to more manufacturers. Nissan were the first new manufacturer to commit to the series with four Nissan Altima L33s followed briefly by Erebus Motorsport with Mercedes-Benz E63 AMGs and Garry Rogers Motorsport with Volvo S60s. The series returned to a Ford and Holden duopoly in 2020 with the departure of Nissan, while Ford replaced the Falcon with the Mustang in 2019. Holden announced its final year of competition in 2022, to be replaced by the Chevrolet Camaro ZL1 for the 2023 season. Starting in 2026, Toyota made its debut in the championship, competing with the GR Supra.

== History ==
=== Group 3A ===
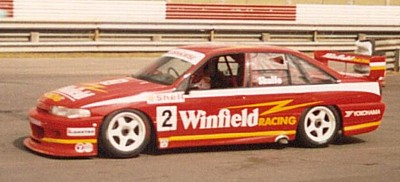
Mark Skaife's 1994 Holden VP Commodore

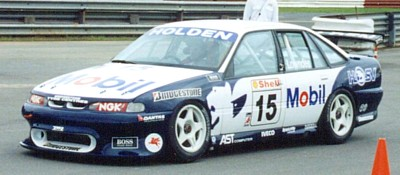
Craig Lowndes' 1996 Holden VR Commodore

The concept of a formula centred around V8-engined Fords and Holdens for the Australian Touring Car Championship had been established as early as mid-1991. With the new regulations set to come into effect in 1993, Ford and Holden were both keen to know the details of the new formula by the end of 1991, putting pressure on the Confederation of Australian Motor Sport (CAMS) to provide clarity on the matter. However, CAMS was waiting to see what the FIA did with its proposed international formula for 2.5- and 2.0-litre touring cars.

The new rules for the ATCC were announced in November 1991 and indicated that the V8 cars would be significantly faster than the smaller-engined cars. In 1992, CAMS looked at closing the performance gap between the classes, only to have protests from Ford and Holden, which did not want to see their cars beaten by the smaller cars. In June 1992, the class structure was confirmed:

- Class A: Australian-produced 5.0-litre V8-engined Fords and Holdens
- Class B: 2.0-litre cars complying with FIA Class II Touring Car regulations
- Class C: normally aspirated two-wheel drive cars complying with 1992 CAMS Group 3A Touring Car regulations:
  This class would only be eligible in 1993.

Both the Ford Falcon EB and Holden Commodore VP ran American-based engines, which were restricted to 7,500 rpm and a compression ratio of 10:1. The Holden teams had the option of using the Group A-developed 5.0-litre Holden V8 engine, although this was restricted to the second-tier privateer teams from 1994 onwards, forcing the major Holden runners to use the more expensive Chevrolet engine. The V8s were first eligible to compete in the endurance races of 1992. The distinctive aerodynamics package, consisting of large front and rear spoilers, was designed partly with this in mind, to give the new cars a better chance of beating the Nissan Skyline GT-Rs in those races.

The new rules meant that cars such as the turbocharged Nissan Skyline GT-R and Ford Sierra RS500 Cosworth were not eligible to compete in 1993, while cars such as the BMW M3 were. However, the M3 received few of the liberal concessions given to the new V8s and also had an extra 100 kilograms (220 lb) added to its minimum weight, so with the Class C cars eligible for 1993 only, the German manufacturer's attention switched to the 2.0-litre class for 1994.

Cars from all three classes would contest the 1993 Australian Touring Car Championship, as well as non-championship Australian touring car events such as the Bathurst 1000. However, for the purposes of race classification and points allocation, cars competed in two classes:

- Over 2,000 cc
- Under 2,000 cc

Originally, the 2.0-litre class cars competed in a separate race to the V8s. This was changed for the second round of 1993 after only nine entrants were in the 2.0-litre class for the first round at Amaroo Park.

With the new regulations intended to be a parity formula, protests by the Holden teams indicated that the Fords had an aerodynamic advantage after they won the opening three rounds, beating the Commodores comprehensively. After round five at Winton, Holden was granted a new front and rear wing package. The BMWs were also allowed new splitters and full DTM-specification rear wings. Disparity between the Fords and Holdens continued to be a talking point during the next few years, with various concessions given to each manufacturer to try to equalise the two cars.

From 1995, the 2.0-litre cars, now contesting their own series as super touring cars, became ineligible for the Australian Touring Car Championship. They did not contest the endurance races at Sandown and Bathurst, leaving these open solely to the 5.0-litre Ford and Holden models.

=== V8 Supercars ===
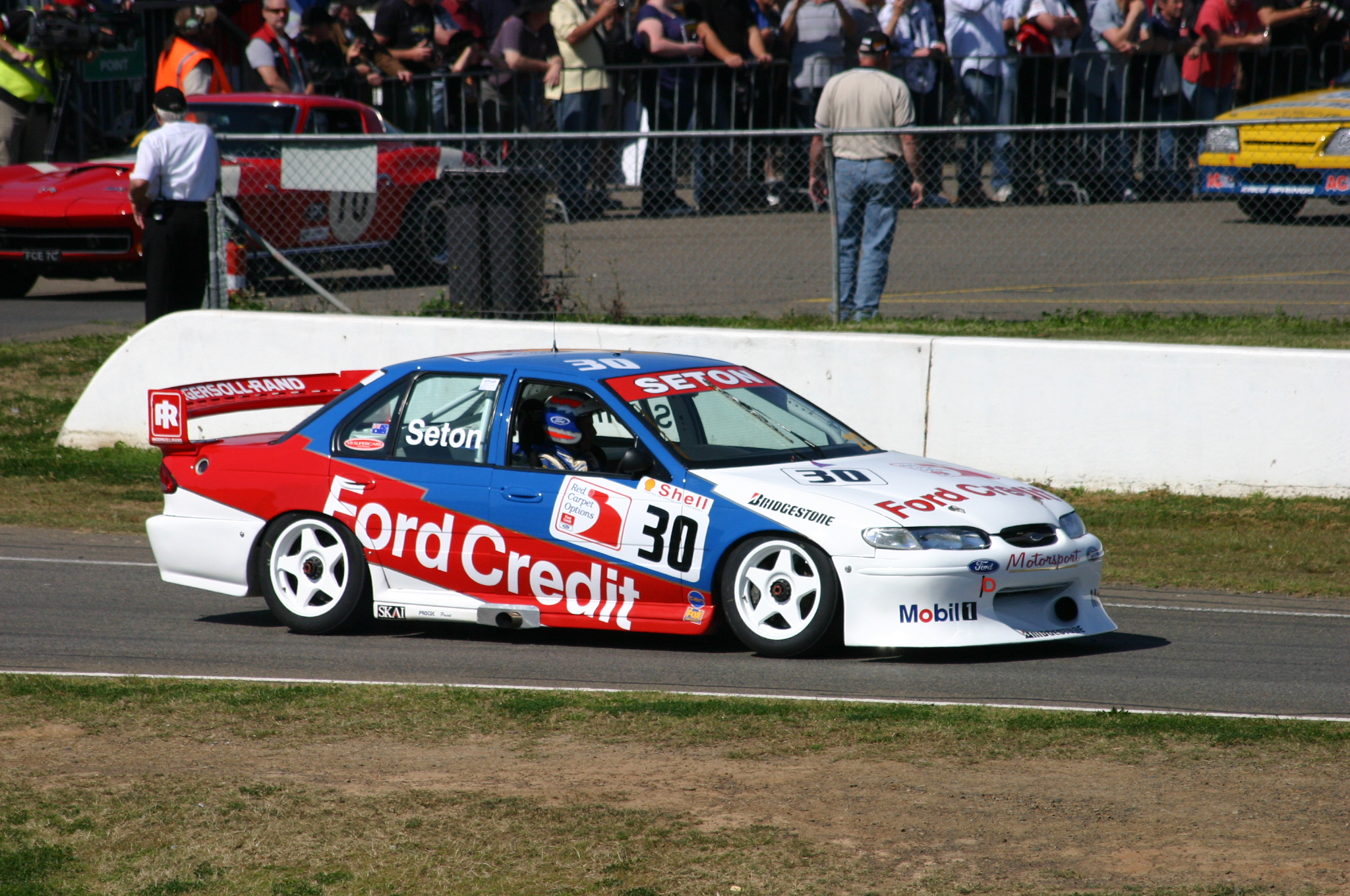
Glenn Seton's 1997 Ford Falcon EL, pictured in 2011

The Australian Vee Eight Super Car Company (AVESCO) – a joint venture between the Touring Car Entrants Group of Australia (TEGA), sports promoters IMG and the Australian Motor Sports Commission – was formed in November 1996 to run the series. This set the foundation for the large expansion of the series during the following years. The category also adopted the name 'V8 Supercars' at this time, though the cars themselves were much unchanged. A new television deal with Network Ten and Fox Sports was organised, although this had follow-on effects for the Bathurst 1000 later in the year.

In February, Tony Cochrane and James Erskine left IMG. Together with David Coe, they formed Sports and Entertainment Limited (SEL) in April 1997. TEGA would have a 75% share in AVESCO, with SEL owning the other 25%. TEGA was responsible for the rules and technical management of the series and the supply of cars and drivers, while SEL was responsible for capturing and maintaining broadcasting rights, sponsorship, licensing, and sanction agreements.

The expansion of the series began in 1998, with the first round to be held in the Northern Territory taking place at Hidden Valley Raceway. In 1999, a new street race on a shortened version of the Adelaide Grand Prix Circuit became one of the first festival-style events, which would become common in later years. Australia's capital city, Canberra, hosted its first event on the Canberra Street Circuit in 2000. In 2001, a championship round was held in New Zealand for the first time, at Pukekohe Park Raceway. In 2002, the V8 Supercar support event at the Indy 300 on the Gold Coast became a championship round, having been a non-championship event since 1994.

Major format changes were made for 1999, with the incorporation of the endurance races into the championship. Control tyres were used for the first time, with Bridgestone selected as the supplier. The series was also renamed from the "Australian Touring Car Championship" to the "Shell Championship Series", by virtue of Shell's sponsorship of the category. Reverse-grid races were introduced for multiple rounds in 2000 before being confined to just the Canberra round for 2001. Also in 2001, compulsory pit stops were introduced at certain rounds and the Top Ten Shootout was used at all rounds. The control tyre supplier changed from Bridgestone to Dunlop in 2002 and the series name was changed to the "V8 Supercar Championship Series" after Shell discontinued their sponsorship.

==== Project Blueprint ====
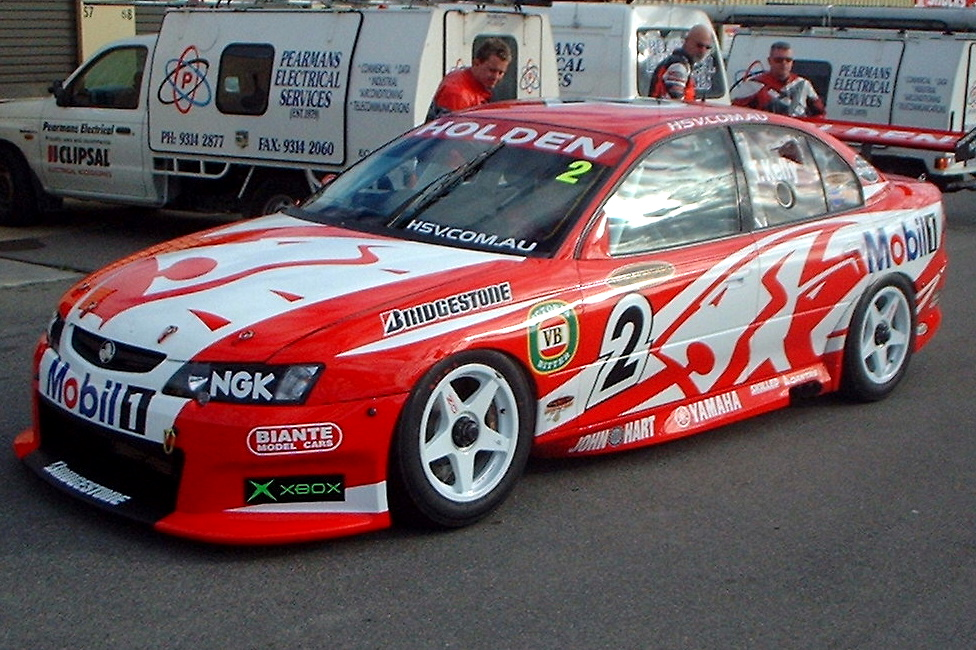
Todd Kelly's 2003 Holden VY Commodore

Discussions about parity had returned in 2000, with 100 millimetres (3.9 in) trimmed from the front spoiler of the Commodore after Holden, in particular, the Holden Racing Team, had dominated in 1998 and 1999. This was in response to the 300 millimetres (12 in) removed from the Falcon in previous seasons, and coincided with a 10 millimetres (0.39 in) trim from the Falcon's rear spoiler. The small reduction for the Holden teams was quickly addressed with both cars receiving the same front splitter shortly afterwards, but the Falcon's rear wing remained trimmed. Ford had threatened to withdraw from the series, but nothing came of this. After Holden again dominated in 2001 and 2002, a new set of regulations, dubbed "Project Blueprint", was introduced in 2003 to close the performance gap between the Commodore and the Falcon, thus creating closer, fairer racing. Project Blueprint was developed by Paul Taylor and Wayne Cattach, who spent two years designing a formula which would eliminate most of the differences between the Fords and Holdens.

Project Blueprint had the chassis pick-up points, wheelbase, track, and driving position become common across both manufacturers. The Holdens were now able and required to use double-wishbone front suspension, similar to that of the Falcon, rather than the MacPherson struts used previously, and a Watts link at the rear rather than a Panhard. The aerodynamic packages were comprehensively tested and revised and differences in the porting of each of the manufacturers' engines were also removed. The performance of the new Ford BA Falcon and Holden VY and VZ Commodores was fairly even for the next four years, with Ford winning the championship in 2003, 2004, and 2005 and Holden winning in 2006. Reverse-grid races were used at certain events in 2006 before unpopularity with the drivers, teams, and fans saw them abolished halfway through the season.

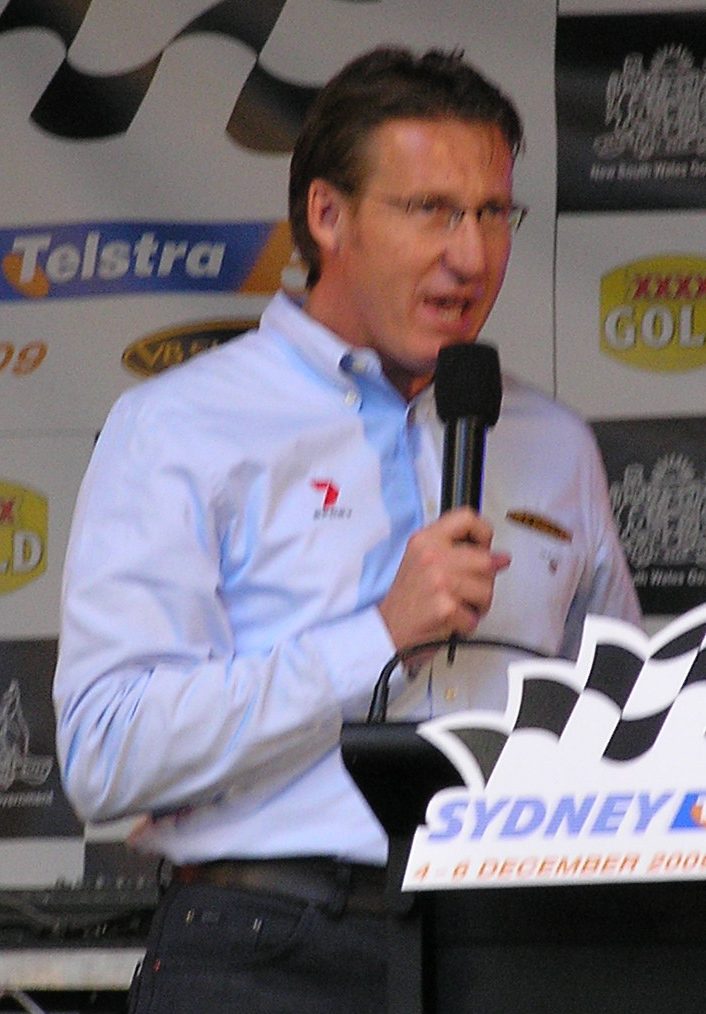
Mark Skaife, five-time series champion and leader of the new generation V8 Supercar project

The Holden VE Commodore caused controversy when it was introduced in 2007. The production model was longer, wider, and taller than the rival Ford BF Falcon and outside of the limits set by Project Blueprint. As a result, the VE race car was granted custom bodywork – namely shortened rear doors and a lowered roofline to meet the regulations. Despite this, the VE was approved for use in the series, along with the BF Falcon, after several months of preseason testing. Sequential gearboxes were introduced in 2008 and became compulsory by the end of the year. In 2009, E85 (a fuel consisting of 85% ethanol and 15% unleaded petrol) was introduced in an effort to improve the environmental image of the sport. Carbon dioxide emissions decreased by up to 50%, but fuel consumption was increased by 30% to produce the same power as before. 2009 also had the introduction of a soft compound tyre at certain events to try to improve the quality of the racing and create different strategies.

In 2005, AVESCO changed its name to V8 Supercars Australia (VESA). The series continued to expand during this time, with races held outside of Australasia for the first time. The series travelled to the Shanghai International Circuit in China in 2005, originally on a five-year agreement, however the promoter of the race dropped their support and the series did not return thereafter. 2006 saw the series travel to the Middle East, with an event held at the Bahrain International Circuit in Bahrain. Multiple new street circuits appeared on the calendar in 2008 and 2009, with new events held in Hamilton in New Zealand, Townsville in North Queensland and at Sydney Olympic Park. The series' Middle East expansion continued in 2010 with a second round held at the Yas Marina Circuit in Abu Dhabi. In November 2010, the series was granted international status by the FIA for the 2011 season, allowing the series to race at up to six international venues each year. As a result, the series name was changed to the 'International V8 Supercars Championship'.

2008 saw the separate boards of directors of VESA and TEGA merge into a single board that was solely responsible for the administration of the category. The new board of directors was composed of four TEGA representatives, two members from SEL and two independent directors. In 2011, TEGA and SEL entered a sale agreement with Australian Motor Racing Partners (AMRP), which had significant financial backing from Archer Capital. This agreement saw SEL lose its 25% stake in V8 Supercars, with Archer Capital taking up a 60% share and TEGA the other 40%. A new board of directors was appointed, with two TEGA representatives and two AMRP representatives.

In 2011, Archer Capital purchased a 65% shareholding in the series with the teams owning the other 35%. In December 2021, both Archer Capital and the teams sold their shareholdings to Race Australia Consolidated Enterprises.

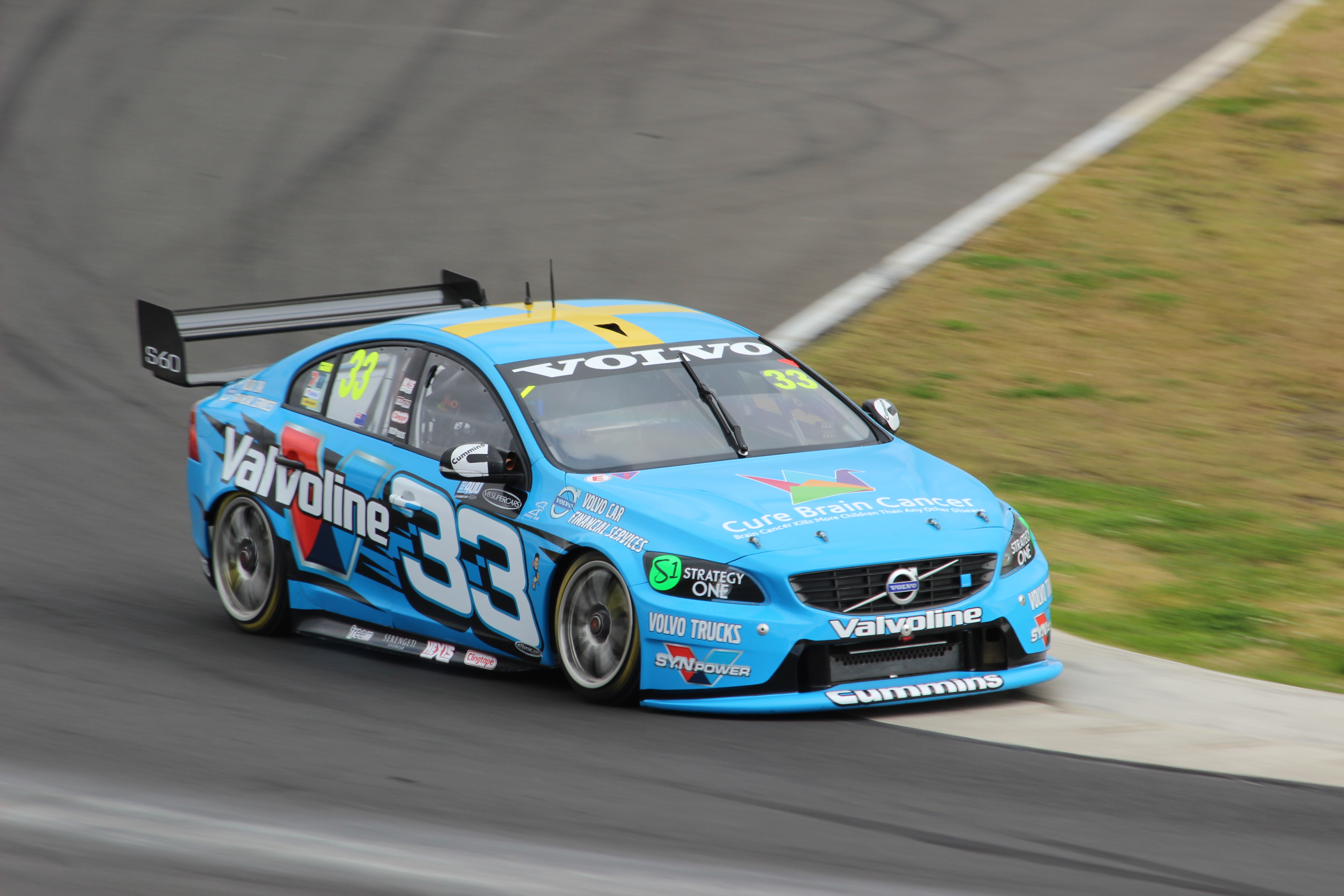
Through the new rules manufacturers such as Volvo were able to enter cars in the series.

==== New Generation V8 Supercar ====
In the middle of 2008, a project led by Mark Skaife was organised by V8 Supercars to investigate future directions for the sport. The project had the primary objective of cutting costs to $250,000 per car through the use of control parts and to create a pathway for new manufacturers to enter the series, provided that they have a four-door saloon car in mass production. The new formula, called "Car of the Future", was scheduled to be introduced before or during the 2012 season. The plan was publicly unveiled in March 2010 and was shown to incorporate several key changes to the internal workings of the car. The chassis and the cooling, fuel and electronics systems would all be changed to control parts, with changes to the engine, drivetrain, rear suspension, wheels and the control brake package. The safety of the cars was also to be reviewed and improved. While the plans were well received by all of the teams, Holden Motorsport boss Simon McNamara warned potential new manufacturers to stay out of the championship just hours after the plans were released, claiming that they would "gain nothing" from entering the series.

Major changes were revealed to include a switch from a live rear axle to independent rear suspension; the use of a rear transaxle instead of a mid-mounted gearbox; the repositioning of the fuel tank to in front of the rear axle to improve safety; replacing the windscreen with a polycarbonate unit; and a switch from 17 inches (430 mm) to 18 inches (460 mm) wheels. In 2011, it was announced that the Car of the Future would not be introduced until 2013. In February 2012, Nissan confirmed that they would enter the series under Car of the Future regulations with Kelly Racing. Later in 2012, Australian GT Championship team Erebus Motorsport announced they would be running Mercedes-Benz cars in the championship, taking over Stone Brothers Racing. In June 2013, Volvo announced it would enter the series in 2014 in a collaboration with its motorsport arm, Polestar Racing and Garry Rogers Motorsport. In November 2013 the Car of the Future moniker was dropped in favour of the name "New Generation V8 Supercar".

The series continued its international expansion in 2013, with the first event in North America held at the Circuit of the Americas in Austin, Texas. In 2015, five drivers took part in a series of demonstration races at the Kuala Lumpur Street Circuit as part of the KL City Grand Prix. This was intended to be a precursor to the series holding a championship event at the circuit in 2016, in a push from CEO James Warburton to build series exposure in Asia. The event was later cancelled due to legal issues affecting the circuit.

=== Supercars Championship ===
In April 2016, the series reached an agreement with Virgin Australia to rename the series to the Virgin Australia Supercars Championship on 1 July.

For the 2021 season, this changed to the Repco Supercars Championship on a 5-year deal, extended to an 8-year deal at the end of 2022.

==== Gen 2 Supercar ====
In December 2014, Supercars released details concerning the future of the category. New regulations, dubbed Gen2 Supercar, were introduced in 2017 to allow the use of two-door coupé body styles and turbocharged four- or six-cylinder engines. However, no teams elected to build cars to these alternate engine specifications. Cars were still required to be based on front-engined, rear-wheel drive, four-seater production cars that were sold in Australia. The chassis and control components were carried over from the New Generation V8 Supercar regulations, while engine and aerodynamic parity was reviewed. Where Holden ZB Commodore made a debut in 2018 and later, Ford Mustang S550 in the 2019 debut as the only Two-door coupe Gen2 specifications and also the successor of FG X Falcon, which been discontinued at the end of 2016.

==== Gen 3 Supercar ====
After being first announced in 2020, and after being delayed for a year due to the COVID-19 pandemic, the Gen 3 regulations were introduced for the 2023 Supercars Championship. The main aim was to create closer racing, to reduce costs and to increase road-relevance for the manufacturers. To do this, sweeping aerodynamic changes were made to cut the generated downforce. This reduced the amount of "dirty" air created, and made the cars more challenging to drive. The regulations continued previous changes to ensure technical parity between cars, helping to keep power, downforce and drag levels identical. Engines were further aligned to road going units, to increase longevity, remove the cost of manufacturing custom parts (in particular velocity stacks) and decrease the cost of a rebuild.

== Supercar specifications ==
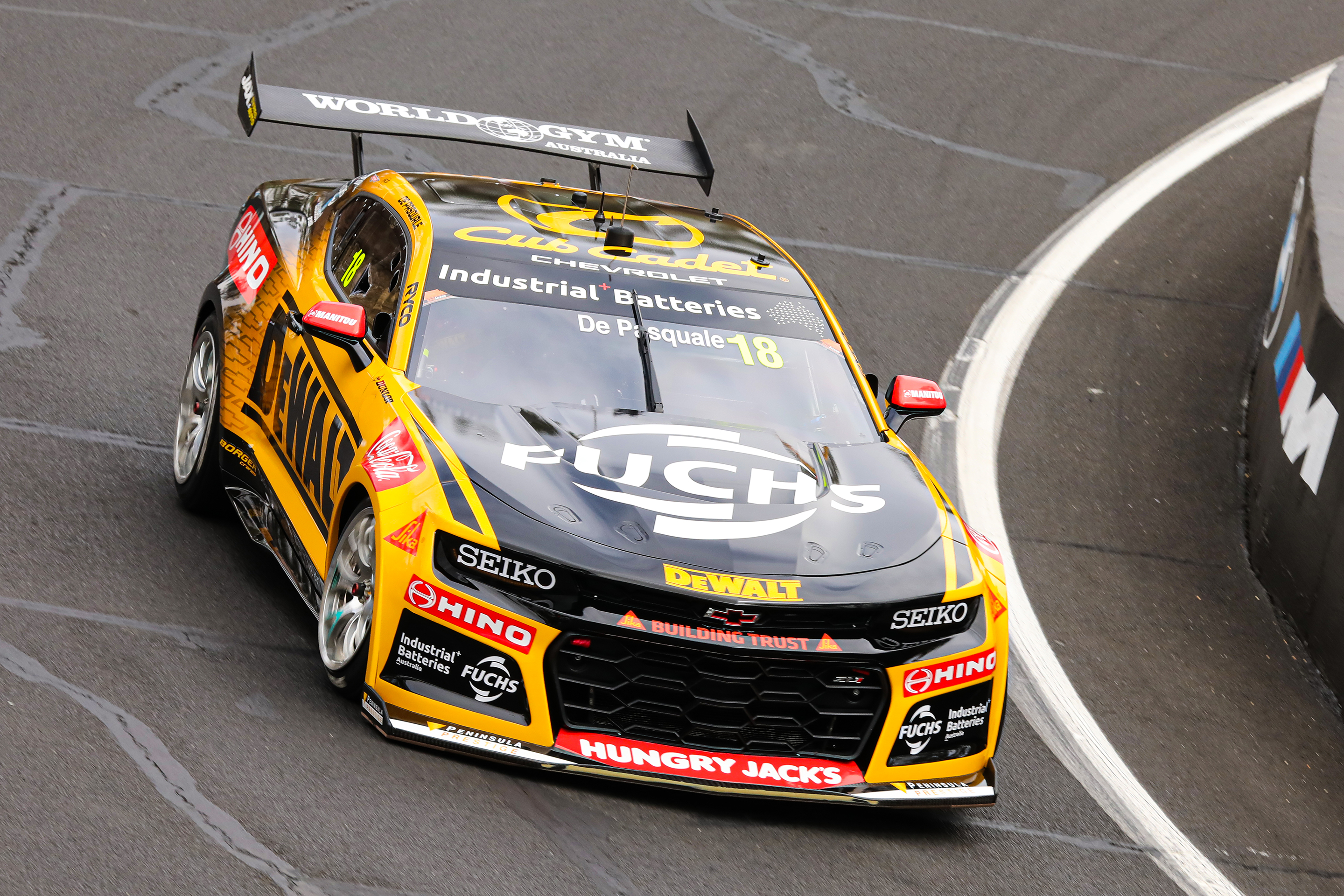
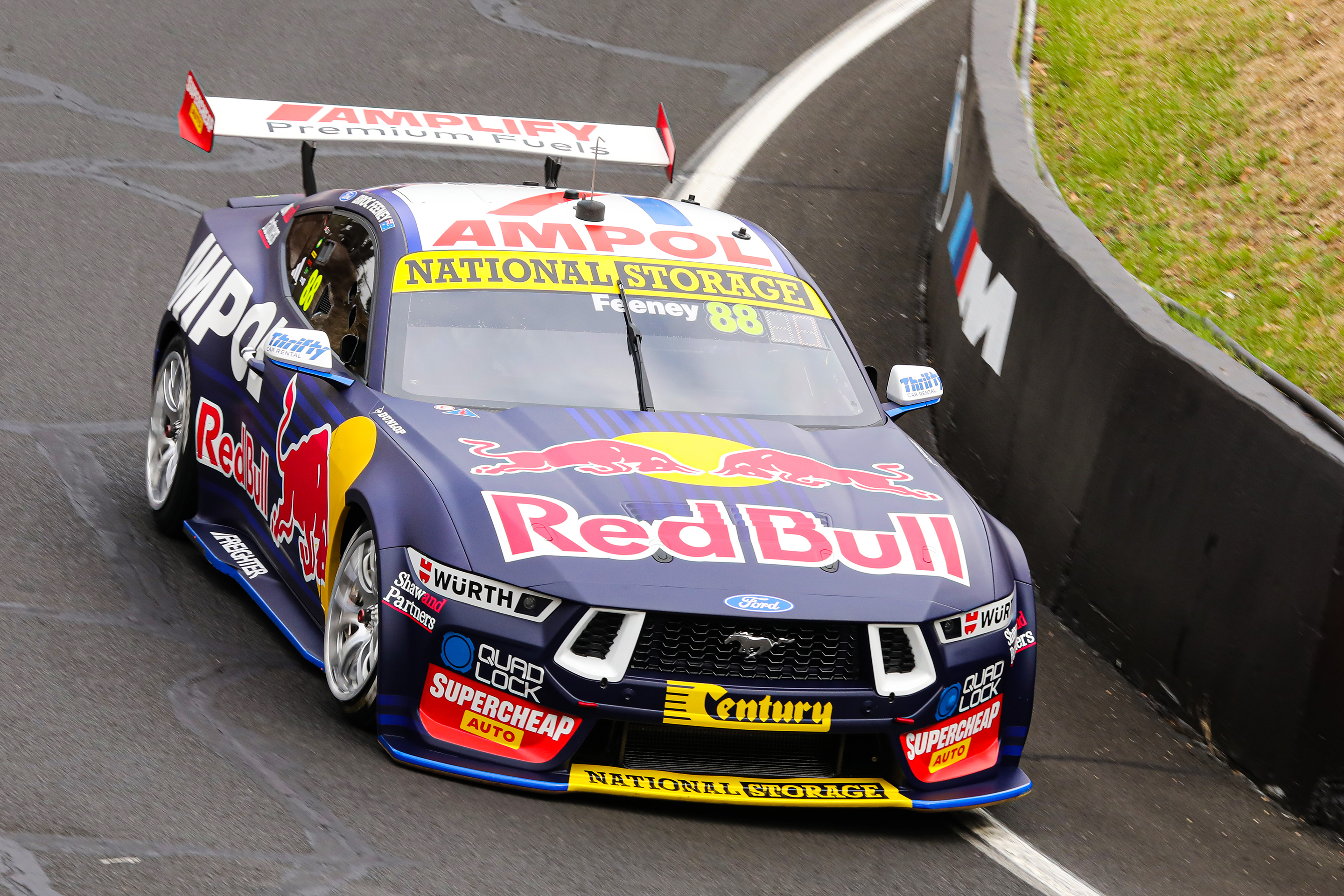

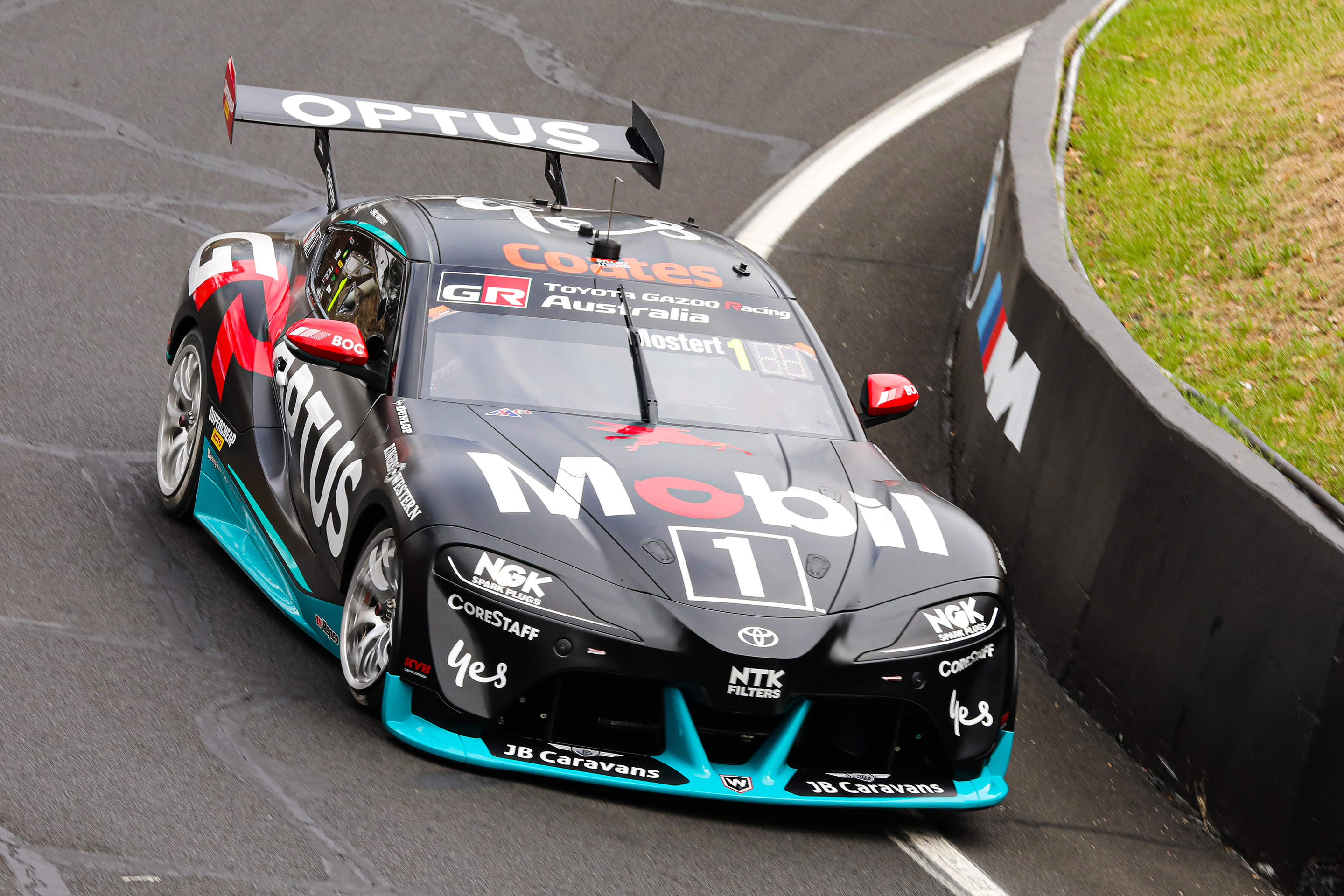
Teams race either the Chevrolet Camaro ZL1 (top), Ford Mustang GT (centre), or Toyota GR Supra (bottom).

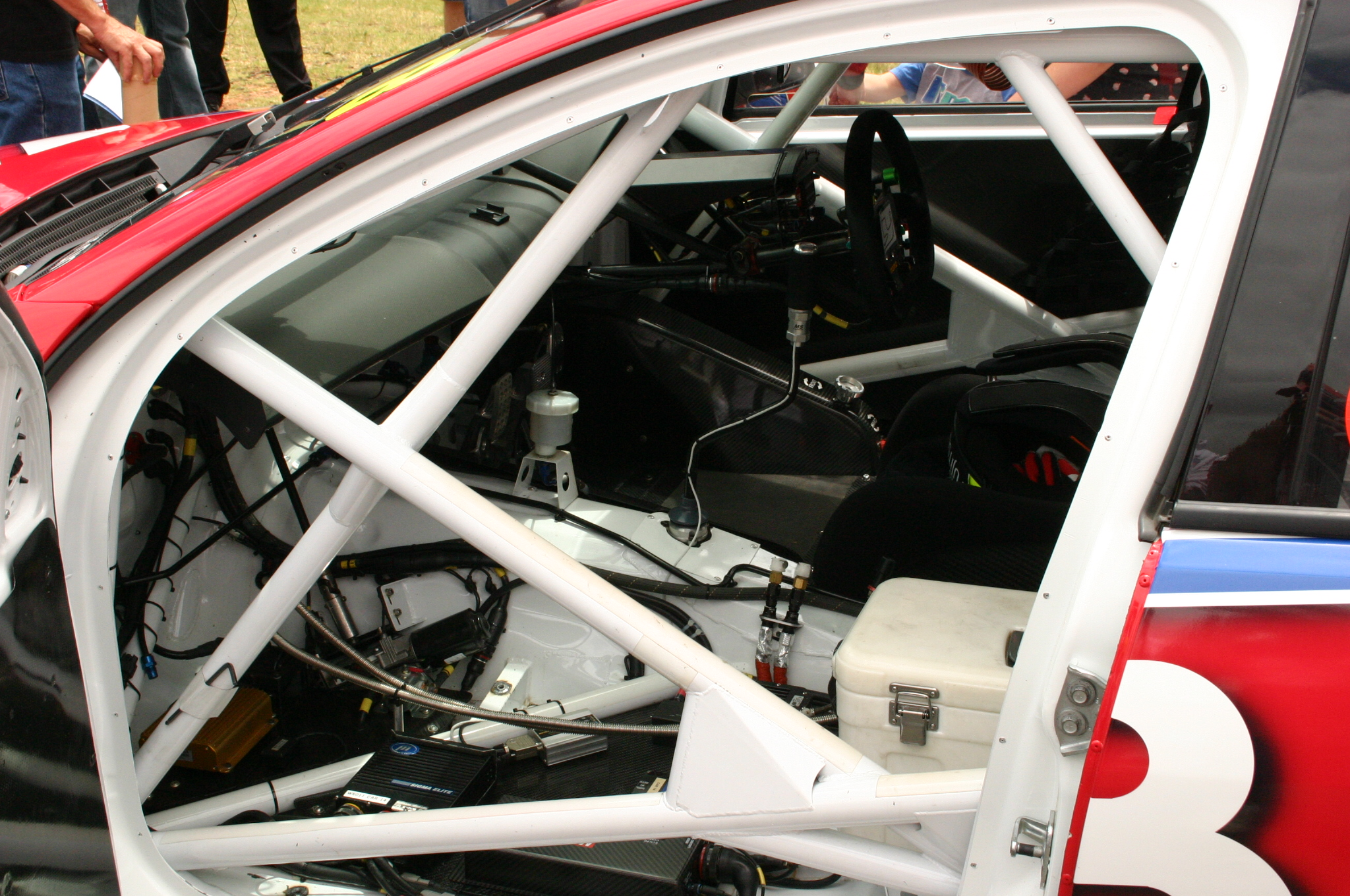
The interior of Jason Bright's 2011 Holden VE Commodore. The driver's seat, steering wheel, gear shifter and parts of the roll cage can be seen.

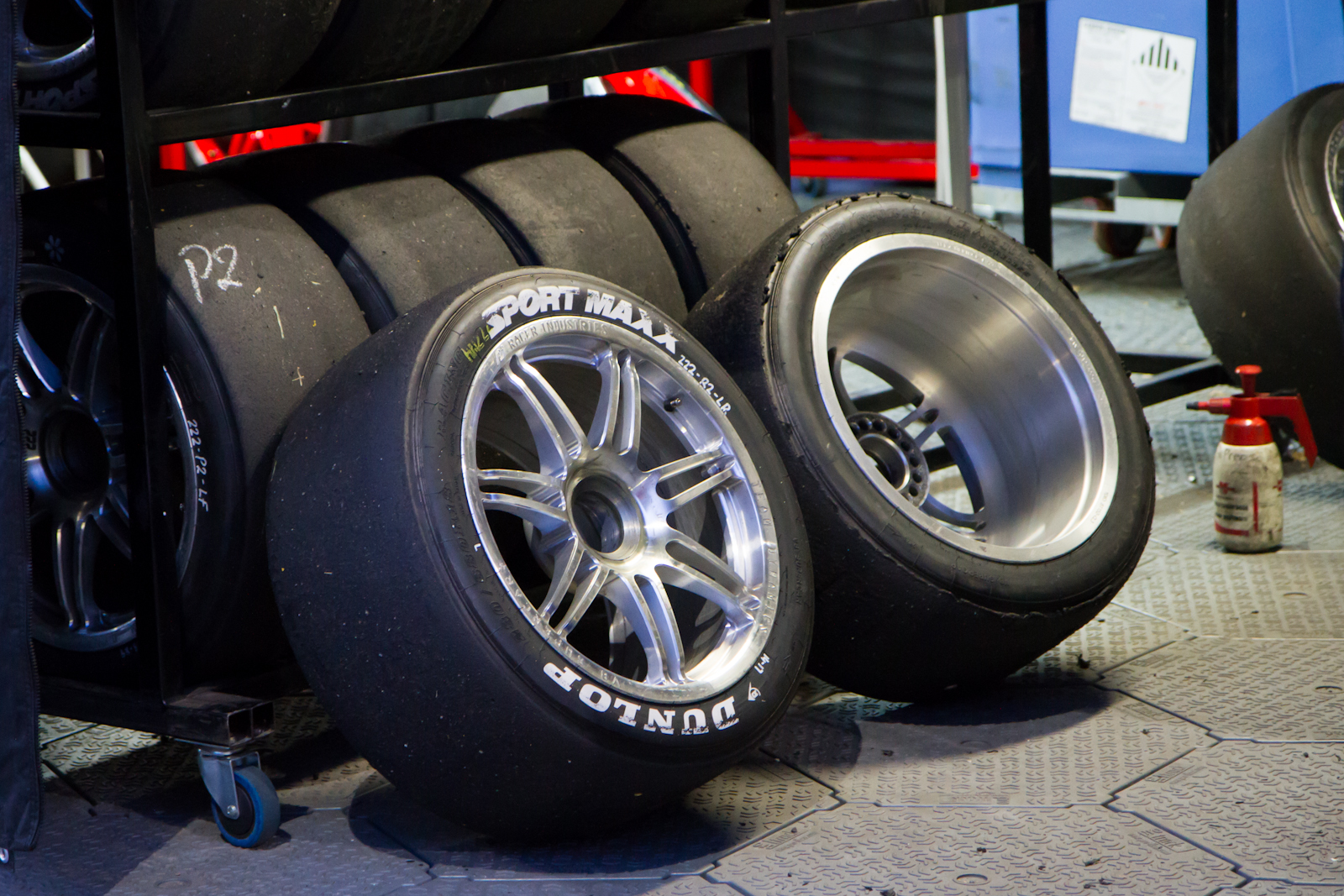
Control wheels fitted with soft compound tyres.

The current Gen 3 regulations are a complete refresh of the previous generation, with the cessation of volume car production in Australia being a major factor. The current cars are the Ford Mustang GT, Chevrolet Camaro ZL1, and the Toyota GR Supra.

The full list of regulations, Sporting and Technical, can be found on the Supercars website in the operations manual.

=== Parity ===
Supercars is a "parity formula" which attempts to ensure that competitors using any of the available car models compete on an equal basis. In this aspect, it is similar in philosophy to the NASCAR Cup Series. The category's current rules, and the charter between organisers and teams state that "..to the extent that it is possible, Competition will take place between the different makes and models of Cars as equalised by the technical parity mechanisms enshrined in the Rules.".

However, the rules go on to state that "The Category is not about equalisation of the abilities of participating Drivers and/or Teams (such equalisation could be, and is in some categories, defined as sporting parity). It is up to individual Drivers and/or Teams to Compete to the best of their abilities under the principle of technical parity."

Parity is intended to extend to aerodynamics, engine performance, and handling characteristics.

In practice, achieving technical parity has proven difficult and contentious, with a number of changes for the 2023 and 2024 season to aerodynamics and engines.

=== Bodyshell ===
The body of each car is based on its corresponding production car in Right Hand Drive and with homologation requirements. The bodies of both models are aerodynamically balanced through these homologations requirements, along with general balancing upon entering Composite and Exotic materials are generally not permitted. The tail lamps are carried over from the road car, while the windscreen is replaced by a polycarbonate unit. The cars also carry cameras for broadcasting.

The bodies are built around a chassis provided by official accredited builders, including certain race teams. Currently, Team 18 homologate the Chevrolet Camaro, Triple Eight Race Engineering homologate the Ford Mustang, Walkinshaw TWG Racing homologate the Toyota GR Supra.

Many safety features are utilised to protect the driver in the event of a crash. The fuel tank is positioned in front of the rear axle to prevent it from being damaged or ruptured in a rear end impact. The driver is seated towards the centre of the car and extra reinforcement is used on the roll cage on the driver's side to lessen the risk of injury in a side-on collision. The cars also feature a collapsible steering column and a fire extinguisher system.

=== Aerodynamics ===
All cars have an aerodynamics package consisting of a front spoiler and splitter, and a rear wing. The aerodynamics package for each manufacturer is homologated after a series of tests which ensure that the different body styles produce near-identical downforce and drag numbers.

By modern racing vehicle standards, Supercars have relatively low amounts of downforce. This is intended to make it easier to follow other cars, and make the handling more similar to road cars. The Gen 3 cars were originally reported to produce about 140 kg of downforce at 200 km/h, similar to a road-registerable Porsche 911 GT3 RS. Revisions in 2024 are stated to produce about 20% more downforce.

=== Weight ===
The minimum weight of each car is 1,335 kilograms (2,943 lb) including the driver and excluding the fuel, with a minimum load of 725 kg over the front axle. The minimum weight for the driver is 95 kg and includes the driver dressed in a full racing suit the seat and seat mountings and any ballast needed to meet the minimum weight. Some other components also have a minimum weight, such as the engine and the front uprights.

=== Engine and drivetrain ===
All cars must be front-engine, rear-wheel-drive, and powered by a V8 engine designated by Supercars for use in the respected model of car, and balanced in power and weight. Currently, the GM engine (for use in the Camaro) is a 5.7L V8 with a single camshaft and two valves per cylinder. The Ford engine (for use in the Mustang) is a 5.4L V8 with four camshafts and 4 valves per cylinder. These engines were designed to be cheaper and have a higher longevity compared to previous engines, along with being more road-relevant. The Toyota engine (for use in the GR Supra) introduced in 2026 is a 5.2L V8 with DOHC with 4 valves per cylinder.

As of the Gen3 Supercars, all engines for a given car model are built by a single engine builder - Herrod Performance Engines for the Mustang and KRE Race Engines for the Camaro. Each engine is tested on a dynamometer before delivery to ensure the power and torque characteristics are to specification, and engine allocation is randomised to preclude more powerful engines being allocated to a specific team. Engines are sealed upon delivery, and modifications are prohibited. Engine servicing is only permitted under strict conditions and after minimum distances completed with the engine. Teams are only permitted two new engines per car, per year.

Power is transferred from the engine to the rear wheels through a six-speed sequential transaxle with an integrated spool differential. The individual gear ratios and the final drive ratio are fixed with drop gears at the front of the transaxle allowing the teams to alter the overall transmission ratio for different circuits. The cars use a triple plate clutch. The cars run on E75 fuel with a fuel tank capacity of about 130 Litres.

An electronic control unit (ECU), provided by MoTeC, is used to monitor and optimise various aspects of the engine's performance. Numerous sensors in the car collect information which is then transmitted to the team, allowing them to monitor things such as tyre wear and fuel consumption and find potential problems with the car. The ECU is also used by officials during the scrutineering process. During the race it can also serve functions such as to automatically limit a car's speed.

=== Suspension ===
All cars are required to use a double wishbone setup for the front suspension and independent rear suspension. Both the front and rear suspension systems feature adjustable shock absorbers and an anti-roll bar which, as of the introduction of the Gen 3 regulations, can not be adjusted from inside the car.

=== Brakes ===
The cars use disc brakes supplied by AP Racing on the front and rear, with the master cylinders provided by AP Racing or former control brake supplier Alcon. The front discs have a diameter of 395 millimetres (15.6 in) and a six-piston caliper, while the rear discs are 355 millimetres (14.0 in) diameter and have a four-piston caliper.

=== Wheels and tyres ===
The cars use 18-inch (460 mm) control wheels, produced by Rimstock and supplied by Racer Industries, and control tyres from Dunlop. Supercars are provided with Soft, Supersoft, and Hard slick tyres as well as grooved wet tyres for each event, The requirement to use varying compounds and how many tyres need to be changed per race are dependent on the event.

=== Performance ===
The highest speed recorded in a Supercar of any generation is 300.5 km/h on the (downhill) Conrod Straight on the Mount Panorama Circuit, by Shane van Gisbergen in qualifying for the 2023 Bathurst 1000. 2024-spec cars are expected to be about 10 km/h slower.

Supercar lap times are similar to the 992 GT3 Cup cars running in the Porsche Carrera Cup Australia Championship. At the 2023 Bathurst 1000, the fastest Supercars qualifying lap recorded was 2:04.664 by Brodie Kostecki. On the same race weekend, the fastest qualifying lap recorded by the Carrera Cup cars was 2:04.6672.

While Gen 3 Supercars and NASCAR Cup Series cars have never raced on the same circuit, their relative performance against Carrera Cup cars gives some indication of how they might compare on the same track. At Circuit of the Americas, the Cup series lap record is more than three seconds per lap slower than Carrera Cup, whereas the Supercars virtually match the Carrera Cup car performance at circuits where they both race. NASCAR Cup Series cars are designed to race on superspeedways and short-track oval courses as well as road circuits. Cam Waters, after driving a Cup series car in preparation for his first NASCAR race, said that the latest-generation NASCAR cars "...feel fairly similar in some ways to the Supercars back home..Fairly heavy, the gearboxes are similar, the brakes are similar, a bit more power (in the Cup Series car)".

Compared to other modern circuit racing vehicles, V8 Supercars are quite powerful, but have relatively little downforce and mechanical grip, making them challenging to drive. The spool differential, which is very uncommon in modern racing vehicles, also requires a specific driving style unique to the series and makes it hard for drivers used to other categories to adapt quickly.

=== Cost ===
The Gen 3 Supercar regulations were intended to reduce the cost of building a car (without engine) from around $450,000 to $250,000. In practice, this did not occur, with teams reporting that rather than reduced costs, building and running costs increased by approximately 30% from Gen2 to Gen3 as of 2023. The increased costs were partly attributed to time pressures getting the cars ready while dealing with the Covid-19 pandemic in 2020-21, and the broader impact on materials costs of that period.

The costs of competing in the championship are considerably higher than the purchase price of a car. There is no budget cap, though caps have been proposed. One estimate puts the season cost for teams at "1.2 to 3 million (Australian) dollars per car" per season.

== Circuits ==
The shortest track used in the championship was the 1.930 km (1.199 mi) Amaroo Park circuit located in the Sydney suburb of Annangrove. The longest track used was the Longford Circuit which measured 7.242 km (4.500 mi). Sandown Raceway in Melbourne has hosted the most rounds with 55.

Of the 36 circuits that have hosted rounds of the championship, eleven have been temporary street or airfield circuits with five still in use as of the 2026 season. Nine international circuits have also been used, four in New Zealand and one each in China, Bahrain, the United Arab Emirates and the United States.

=== Current Events ===
Most Recent Event Name	Circuit	Contract End	Years	Ref.
Bathurst 1000	(New South Wales) Mount Panorama Circuit	2034	1966, 1969–1970, 1972, 1995–1996, 1999–2026	
Adelaide Grand Final	(South Australia) Adelaide Street Circuit	2034	1999–2020, 2022–2025	
Darwin Triple Crown	(Northern Territory) Hidden Valley Raceway	2030	1998–2026	
Melbourne SuperSprint	(Victoria (state)) Albert Park Circuit	2029	2018–2020, 2022–2026	
Taupō Super 440	(New Zealand) Taupō International Motorsport Park	2028	2024–2026	
Christchurch Super 440	(New Zealand) Euromarque Motorsport Park	2028	2026	
The Bend 500	(South Australia) The Bend Motorsport Park	2028	2018–2023, 2025–2026	
Tasmania Super 440	(Tasmania) Symmons Plains Raceway	2027	1969–1999, 2004–2019, 2021–2026	
Townsville SuperSprint	(Queensland) Reid Park Street Circuit	2027	2009–2026	
Perth Super 440	(Western Australia) Wanneroo Raceway	2027	1973, 1978–2009, 2011–2019, 2022–2026	
Gold Coast 500	(Queensland) Surfers Paradise Street Circuit	2027	2002–2019, 2022–2026	
Sandown 500	(Victoria (state)) Sandown Raceway	2027	1965, 1970–1974, 1976–1989, 1991–1992, 1994–2019, 2021–2025	
Ipswich Super 440	Queensland Raceway	2026	1999–2019, 2025–2026	
Sydney 500	(New South Wales) Sydney Motorsport Park	unknown	1992–1997, 1999–2005, 2007–2008, 2012, 2014–2018, 2020–2026	

=== Future Events ===
Future/Returning Circuits
Event Name	Circuit	Contract	Ref.
Perth SuperSprint	(Western Australia) Perth Park	2028 - TBA	
Phillip Island 500	(Victoria (state)) Phillip Island Grand Prix Circuit	2027 - 2031	

=== Former Championship Races ===
† indicates the track has been closed for racing

Former Events
Most Recent Event Name	Circuit	Years	Ref.
Adelaide ATCC round	(South Australia) Adelaide International Raceway†	1972–1988	
Amaroo Park ATCC round	(New South Wales) Amaroo Park†	1974–1978, 1985–1994	
Desert 400	Bahrain International Circuit	2006–2008, 2010	
Calder Park V8 Supercar round	(Victoria (state)) Calder Park Raceway	1969–1983, 1985–1988, 1996–2001	
Canberra 400	(Australian Capital Territory) Canberra Street Circuit†	2000–2002	
Austin 400	(United States) Circuit of the Americas	2013	
(Only race in season)	(New South Wales) Gnoo Blas Motor Racing Circuit†	1960	
Hamilton 400	(New Zealand) Hamilton Street Circuit†	2008–2012	
Sydney 500	(New South Wales) Homebush Street Circuit†	2009–2016	
Lakeside ATCC round	(Queensland) Lakeside International Raceway	1964, 1967, 1970–1971, 1975–1998	
(Only race in season)	(Tasmania) Longford Circuit†	1962	
(Only race in season)	(Queensland) Lowood Airfield Circuit†	1961	
Mallala ATCC round	(South Australia) Mallala Motor Sport Park	1963, 1969–1971, 1989–1998	
Mount Panorama 500 (not to be confused with Bathurst 1000)	(New South Wales) Mount Panorama Circuit	1966, 1969--1970, 1972, 1995--1996, 2021, 2024	
Newcastle 500	(New South Wales) Newcastle Street Circuit†	2017–2019, 2023	
Oran Park V8 Supercar round	(New South Wales) Oran Park Raceway†	1971–2008	
Auckland SuperSprint	(New Zealand) Pukekohe Park Raceway†	2001–2007, 2013–2019, 2022	
Queensland 500	(Queensland) Queensland Raceway	1999--2008	
V8 Supercars China Round	(China) Shanghai International Circuit	2005	
Surfers Paradise ATCC round	(Queensland) Surfers Paradise International Raceway†	1969, 1971–1977, 1979–1987	
V8 Supercar Challenge	(Queensland) Surfers Paradise Street Circuit	1994, 1996--2009	
The Bend SuperSprint	(South Australia) The Bend Motorsport Park	2018--2023	
Warwick Farm ATCC round	(New South Wales) Warwick Farm Raceway†	1968, 1970, 1972–1973	
Winton SuperSprint	(Victoria (state)) Winton Motor Raceway	1985–1986, 1988–1995, 1997–2004, 2006–2019, 2022	
Yas Marina Circuit V8 Supercar Event	(United Arab Emirates) Yas Marina Circuit	2010–2012	

=== Non-Championship Events ===
This section refers to non-championship events held in the Group 3A era of 1993 onwards.

† indicates the track has been closed for racing

Former Non-Championship Events
Event Name	Circuit	Years	Ref.
Supercars Challenge	(South Australia) Adelaide Street Circuit	1985–1995	
Supercars Challenge	(Victoria (state)) Albert Park Circuit	1996–2006, 2008–2017	
TAC Peter Brock Classic	(Victoria (state)) Calder Park Raceway	1995	
Winfield Triple Challenge	(New South Wales) Eastern Creek Raceway	1993–1995	
Kuala Lumpur City Grand Prix	(Malaysia) Kuala Lumpur Street Circuit†	2015	
Bathurst 1000 Primus/FAI 1000 Classic	(New South Wales) Mount Panorama Circuit	1993–1998	
Mobil 1 Sprints	(New Zealand) Pukekohe Park Raceway†	1996	
Sandown 500	(Victoria (state)) Sandown Raceway	1993–1998	
V8 Supercar Challenge	(Queensland) Surfers Paradise Street Circuit	1994, 1996–2001	
Mobil 1 Sprints	(New Zealand) Wellington Street Circuit†	1996	

== Series structure ==
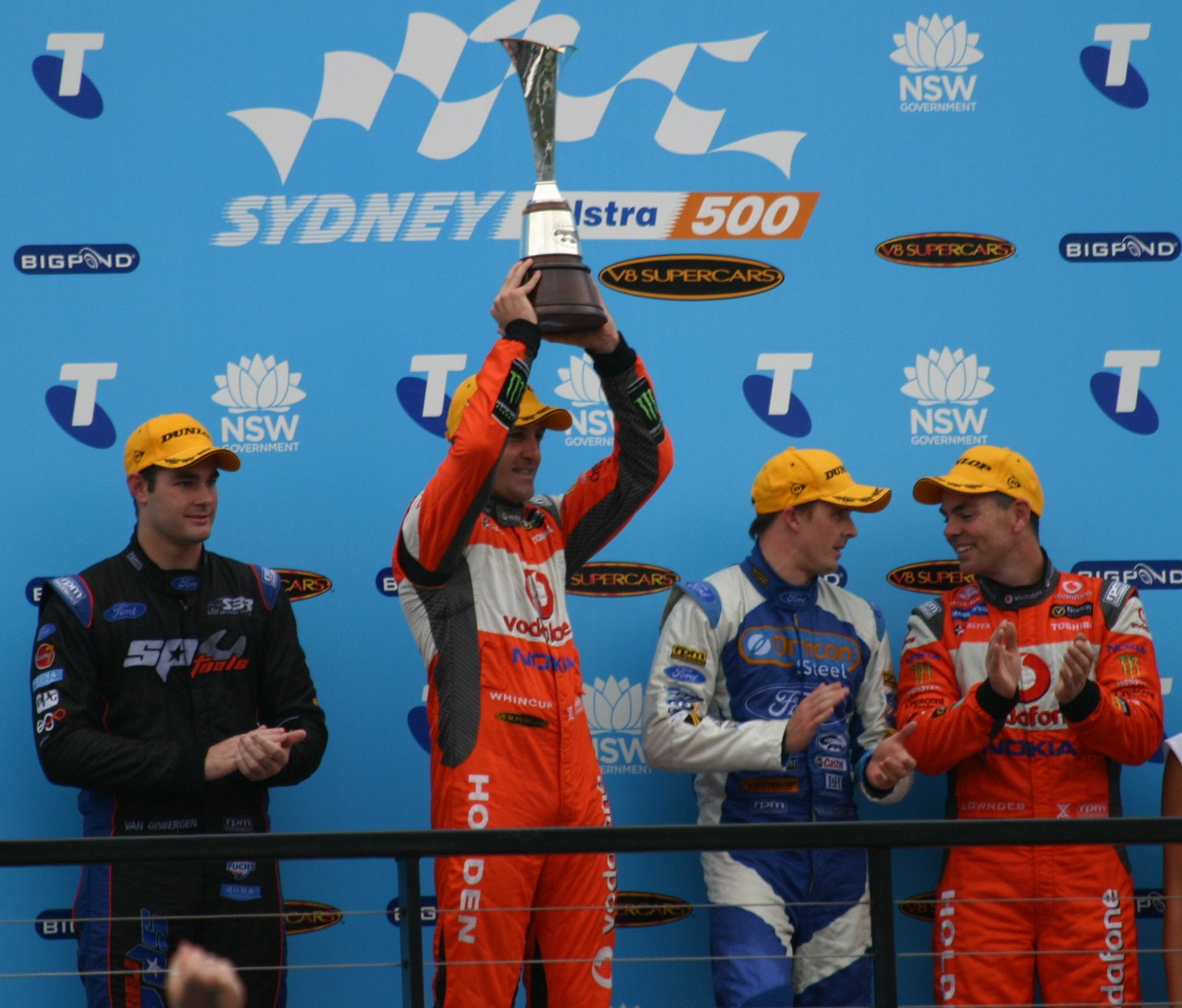
Jamie Whincup (second from left), the most successful driver in the category's history, celebrates winning the 2011 series.

=== Teams and drivers ===
In order to compete in the Supercars Championship, drivers are required to hold a Motorsport Australia Superlicence, earned by success in other high-level Australian circuit racing series (with special eligibility processes for overseas drivers).

Each car entered is required to have a Teams Racing Charter (TRC), formerly known as a Racing Entitlements Contract (REC). A TRC is a contract between Supercars and a team which outlines the team's entitlements and obligations. TRCs may be leased by their owners to another party for a maximum of two years, after which the owner must either use it themselves or sell it. A racing number is tied to each TRC, with teams able to apply for a TRC number to be changed. The defending series champion is entitled to use the number 1, with the original TRC number of that car reserved and not able to be used by another team without the agreement of its owner.

The TRCs were originally issued in 1999. Known as TEGA franchise agreements, they were divided into three categories – Level 1, Level 2 and Level 3. Twelve Level 1 franchises were issued to those teams that had competed in the series full-time since its inception in 1997:

- Dick Johnson Racing
- Garry Rogers Motorsport
- Gibson Motorsport
- Glenn Seton Racing
- John Faulkner Racing
- Holden Racing Team
- Lansvale Racing Team
- Larkham Motor Sport
- Longhurst Racing
- Perkins Engineering
- Romano Racing
- Stone Brothers Racing

A thirteenth was later issued to Bob Forbes Racing. A Level 1 franchise required a team to race at least one car at all events, and at various times allowed a team to enter up to four cars. Other teams received Level 2 and Level 3 franchises based on their level of participation. The structure was changed a number of times before the present system of 28 RECs was arrived at in 2011. Supercars bought a number of RECs as they became available in order to achieve a long-held desire to reduce the field to 28 cars.

At the end of 2013, Lucas Dumbrell Motorsport, Tony D'Alberto Racing and Triple F Racing each returned a REC to Supercars. These were put up for sale in 2014, but no bids were received. One was reclaimed by Lucas Dumbrell Motorsport in 2015 after a legal fight. At the end of 2014, a further REC was returned by James Rosenberg Racing. In April 2015, Supercars launched a tender for one REC for the 2016 season, with Triple Eight the successful bidder.

Teams consist of one to four cars, with most one-car teams forming a technical alliance with a larger team. Only the REC holders are allowed to compete at each event, although "wildcard" entries are accepted for the endurance races, with a maximum of six extra cars on top of the regular 28. Both Supercars and Development Series teams have entered wildcard entries in previous years. In 2014, the first wildcard entry for a sprint race was issued when Dick Johnson Racing entered a third car for Marcos Ambrose at the Sydney 500.

Most drivers in the series are full-time professionals paid by their teams. Exact salaries are not disclosed, but former team owner Roland Dane stated in 2024 "...the two top Supercar drivers are earning more than all their European based counterparts racing in GT3.". Pay drivers are not unknown, but reportedly make up a small minority of the Supercar field.

Teams are required to employ a co-driver for each car during the two endurance races due to the increased race distance and the need for driver substitutions during the race. Teams were able to pair their full-time drivers in one car until a rule change in 2010 that required each full-time driver to remain in his own car and be joined by a co-driver not competing full-time in the series. The Drivers Championship title is awarded to the driver who accumulates the most points over the course of the season. If there is a points tie for the series win, the champion will be decided based on the number of races won by each driver (if there is still a tie, it is based on second-place finishes and so on). Teams also compete for the Teams Championship, with the champion team being decided in the same manner as the Drivers Championship. For Teams Championship points scoring purposes, teams with four cars are separated into a pair of two-car teams, while teams with three cars are split into a two-car team and a single-car team. The Teams Championship dictates the pit lane order for the following season.

The defending champion driver has the right to carry the number 1 the following year. However, Shane van Gisbergen and Scott McLaughlin elected to retain their existing numbers in 2017, 2019, 2020, 2022 & 2023.

=== Development series ===
A second-tier series, the Dunlop Super2 Series, is run as a support category to the main series at certain events. Initially for privateers who did not have the funding of the professional teams in the late 1990s, the series now serves the dual purpose of developing young drivers before they compete in the main series and a means for main series teams to give their endurance co-drivers more racing experience prior to the endurance races. Teams in the Dunlop Super2 Series compete with cars previously used in the main series. From the 2021 Season until the end of the 2024 season the Dunlop Super2 Series would compete as a class alongside the Super3 Series V8 Supercars class racing together on track at the same time. In the year 2025 season the Super3 Series would be axed due to low grid numbers in the 2024 season reverting back to a single class of the Dunlop Series.

A third V8 Supercar-based series, the Kumho Tyres V8 Touring Car Series, had been run since 2008 until the end of 2024, but had no involvement with the Supercars Championship or Dunlop Super2 Series, instead running on the programme of the Shannons Nationals Motor Racing Championships. However, since 2016, several rounds have been run as support categories at Supercars events. It would officially become the third-tier series of V8 Supercars starting in 2019 before the category known as the Super3 Series would join as a class alongside Super2 Series Class V8 Supercars starting in the 2021 season. In the 2023 Season the V8 Touring Car Series would be revived to create an unofficial standalone fourth-tier level V8 Supercars category using V8 Supercars sold to teams that are no longer racing in the Super3 Series of the Dunlop Super2 & Super3 Series, however it would only last for that year's season. The Super3 Series would officially be axed in 2025 and become defunct due to low grid numbers with only as many as two or three cars appearing at rounds in the 2024 Dunlop Super2 & Super3 Series season.

== Qualifying ==
In 2023, there are two distinct formats for determining grid positions in races: Format 1 and Format 2. Format 1 uses a single qualifying session where all drivers participate simultaneously to establish their grid positions. Format 2, on the other hand, divides qualifying into three separate sessions. During Q1, the five slowest cars are assigned the last five grid positions, and the faster cars progress to Q2. In Q2, this process is repeated to determine the next ten grid positions. Finally, Q3 decides the top 10 grid positions. This can be done through a standard qualifying session or a 'top-ten shoot-out', where each driver has a single opportunity to set their lap time.

The selection between these qualifying formats is influenced by a variety of factors, including the layout of the track, the length of each race, and strategic considerations unique to each event. This approach allows the championship to adapt to a wide range of racing conditions and maintains a dynamic and engaging competition for participants and spectators alike, however, it is not uncommon for both Qualifying Format 1 and Format 2 to be utilised over the course of the same race weekend, especially during events that feature multiple races.

== Race formats ==
In 2023, there were three racing formats: SuperSprint, two-race rounds and endurance.

In previous years, formats included SuperSprint events, International SuperSprint events, SuperStreet events and Enduro Cup events.

=== SuperSprint ===
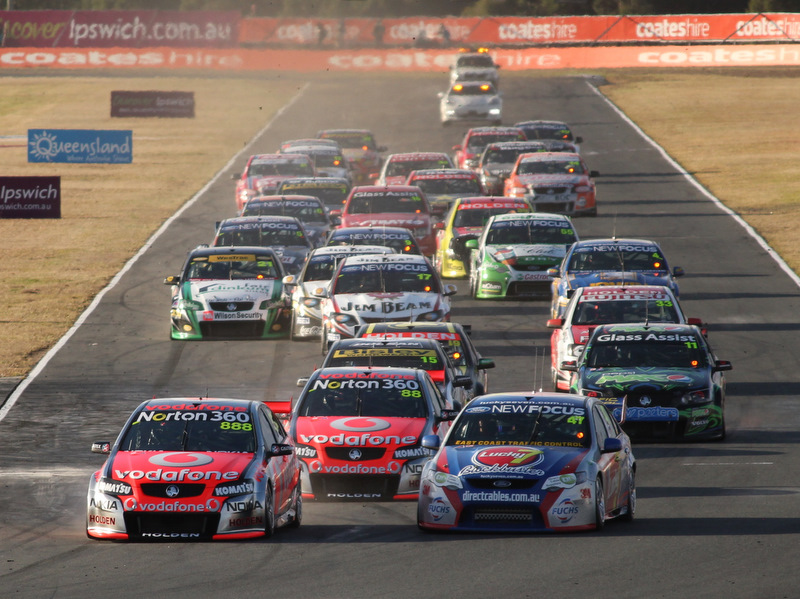
The start of a race at Queensland Raceway in 2011.

In 2023, the SuperSprint format was used for the Melbourne SuperSprint (previously known as the Melbourne 400), the Perth SuperSprint, the Tasmania SuperSprint, the Sydney SuperNight, the Darwin Triple Crown and The Bend SuperSprint.

The format was previously used for the Phillip Island SuperSprint, Winton SuperSprint and the Ipswich SuperSprint.

The SuperSprint format generally involves three (at the Melbourne Supersprint four) races, each with separate qualifying sessions, on the Saturday and the Sunday. Some races use the same qualifying format for each race while other use format 1 and 2 on different days.

In previous years, the Phillip Island and Sydney Motorsport Park events featured a single one-hour practice session on Saturday, while all other SuperSprint events have two one-hour practice sessions on the Friday with a fifteen-minute practice session on Saturday. The Winton and Ipswich events featured an extra thirty-minute session on Friday for endurance co-drivers. The SuperSprint format featured a fifteen-minute qualifying session held on Saturday to decide the grid for the race on the same day. A single twenty-minute session was held on Sunday morning to decide the grid for the Sunday race. The Darwin event also featured a top ten shootout (a session where the fastest ten qualifiers complete one flying lap each to determine the top ten on the grid) following the Sunday qualifying session. A single 120 or 150 kilometres (75 or 93 mi) race was held on Saturday with a single 250 or 300 kilometres (160 or 190 mi) race was held on Sunday.

==== International SuperSprint ====
The International SuperSprint format was used at the Auckland SuperSprint.

Three thirty-minute practice sessions are held on Friday, while Saturday and Sunday both consist of two ten-minute qualifying sessions which set the grid for the pair of 200 kilometres (120 mi) races held on each day.

=== Two-race Weekends ===
The two-race round format, previously known as the SuperStreet format, covers those races not branded as a SuperSprint or an endurance race. In 2023 the format will be used in the Newcastle 500, the Townsville 500, the Gold Coast 500 and the Adelaide 500.

This format generally involves two races on the Saturday and Sunday of the race weekend, 250 km in length. Unlike the SuperSprint, refuelling is allowed.

In previous years, two thirty-minute practice sessions took place on Friday at each SuperStreet event, while a thirty-minute practice session is held on Saturday at Adelaide. The Adelaide event features a fifteen-minute qualifying session on Friday to determine the grid for the Saturday race, while the other events have a single fifteen-minute session on Saturday. All four events feature a twenty-minute session followed by a top ten shootout both on Saturday and Sunday. The Adelaide 500, Newcastle 500, Townsville 500 and Gold Coast 500 feature a single 250 kilometres (160 mi) race on each of Saturday and Sunday.

=== Endurance races ===
In 2023, there are two endurance races, the Bathurst 1000 and the Sandown 500. In previous years, the Gold Coast race was run as an endurance race and the driver who won the most points over the three races was awarded the Enduro Cup.

This format is a single endurance race over either 500 or 1000 km with refuelling allowed and multiple drivers required. The Bathurst race takes around six hours to complete with the Sandown race taking around half that.

In previous years, the Sandown 500 and the Gold Coast 600 both featured three thirty-minute practice sessions held on Friday, with Sandown having an extra session on Saturday. Practice for the Bathurst 1000 consists of six one-hour sessions held across Thursday, Friday and Saturday. Qualifying for the Sandown 500 involves a twenty-minute session followed by a pair of 60 kilometres (37 mi) "qualifying races" held on Saturday. The grid for the first race is based on the qualifying session; the grid for the second race is based on the results of the first. The results of the second race determine the grid for the main race on Sunday. Co-drivers must compete in the first of the qualifying races while the main driver must compete in the second. The Bathurst 1000 features a single forty-minute qualifying session on Friday afternoon followed by a top ten shootout on Saturday. The Gold Coast 600 had two twenty-minute qualifying sessions, one each on Saturday and Sunday, with the Sunday session followed by a top ten shootout. The Sandown 500 and Bathurst 1000 both have a twenty-minute warm-up session on Sunday morning.

The Sandown 500 and the Bathurst 1000 feature single races held on Sunday, at 500 kilometres (310 mi) and 1,000 kilometres (620 mi) in length respectively. The Gold Coast 600 consisted of two 300 kilometres (190 mi) races with one held on Saturday and one on Sunday.

=== Points systems ===
Between the founding of the championship and the current season, many different points scoring systems have been used. In the first few years, the same basic system as Formula 1 was used. Since the 1980s, separate point systems have been developed, some of which were based on the length of the race or which took into account whether there was only one long-distance race or several short races in a championship round. This should give the races a better weighting.

==== 2008–2024 ====
Points are awarded as follows at all championship events. Various different points scales are applied to events having one, two, three or four races, ensuring that a driver will be awarded 300 points for winning all races at any event. Points are awarded to all cars that have covered 75% of the race distance, provided they are running at the completion of the final lap and with a final lap time within 200% of the race winner's fastest lap. At the endurance events, both drivers earn the total points awarded to the finishing position of the car.

Points Scale	Position																													
Points Scale	1st	2nd	3rd	4th	5th	6th	7th	8th	9th	10th	11th	12th	13th	14th	15th	16th	17th	18th	19th	20th	21st	22nd	23rd	24th	25th	26th	27th	28th	29th	30th
Endurance-race 1000 km	300	276	258	240	222	204	192	180	168	156	144	138	132	126	120	114	108	102	96	90	84	78	72	66	60	54	48	42	36	30
Endurance-race 500 km (2019)	250	230	215	200	185	170	160	150	140	130	120	115	110	105	100	95	90	85	80	75	70	65	60	55	50	45	40	35	30	25
Endurance-race 500 km (2008–2012)	200	184	172	160	148	136	128	120	112	104	96	92	88	84	80	76	72	68	64	60	56	52	48	44	40	36	32	28	24	20
Two-race	150	138	129	120	111	102	96	90	84	78	72	69	66	63	60	57	54	51	48	45	42	39	36	33	30	27	24	21	18	15
Three-race	100	92	86	80	74	68	64	60	56	52	48	46	44	42	40	38	36	34	32	30	28	26	24	22	20	18	16	14	12	10
Four-race	75	69	64	60	55	51	48	45	42	39	36	34	33	31	30	28	27	25	24	22	21	19	18	16	15	13	12	10	9	7
Sprint races (2009–2019)	50	46	43	40	37	34	32	30	28	26	24	23	22	21	20	19	18	17	16	15	14	13	12	11	10	9	8	7	6	5

==== 2025–present ====
Starting from the year 2025, a finals system was introduced to the championship. In this system, drivers compete throughout the sprint cup and enduro cup to earn points to qualify for entry into the finals. Ten drivers are awarded entry into the finals, with the finals occurring as knockout events across the races of the last three rounds of the season.

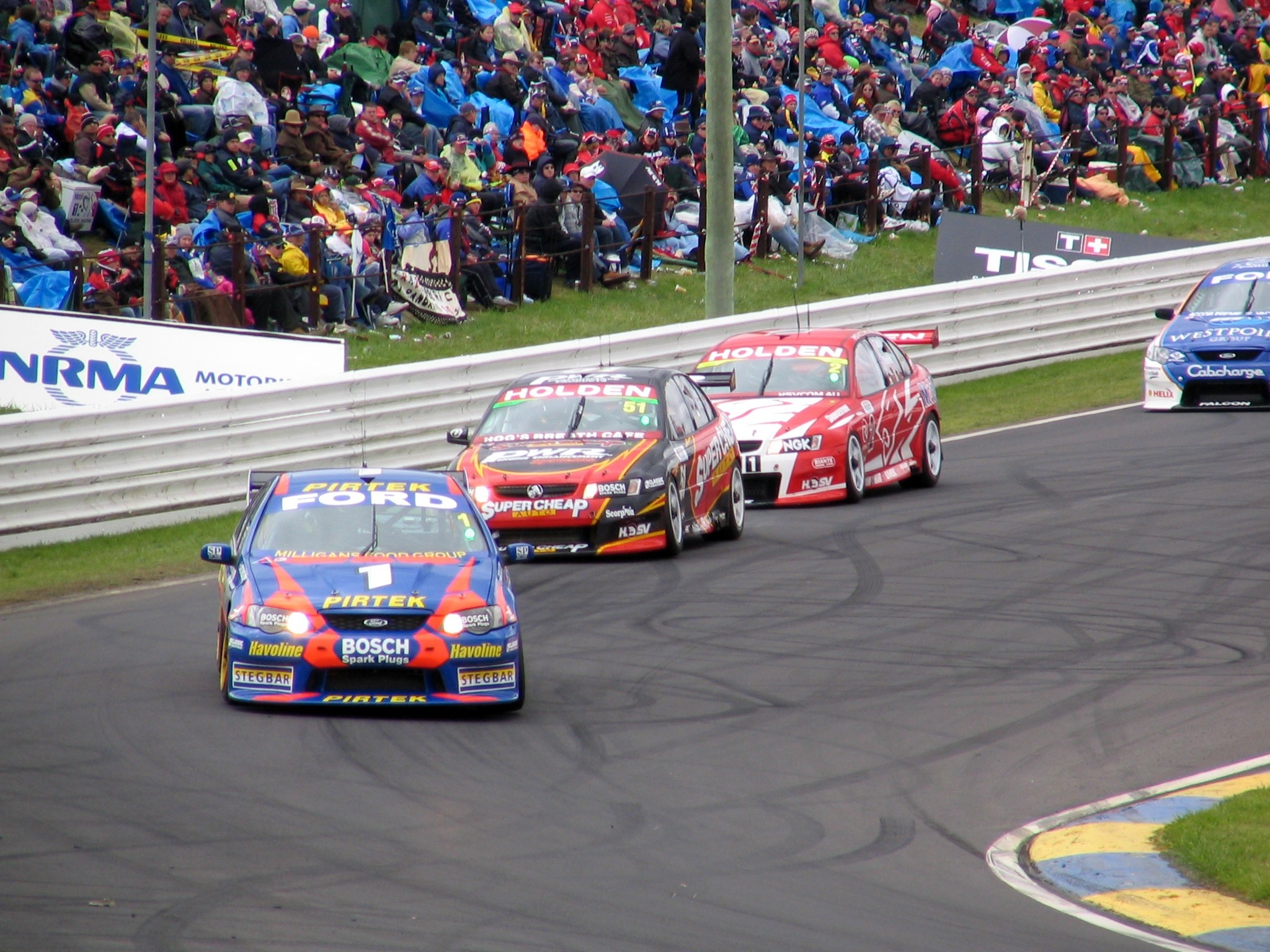
Cars on track during the 2005 Bathurst 1000.

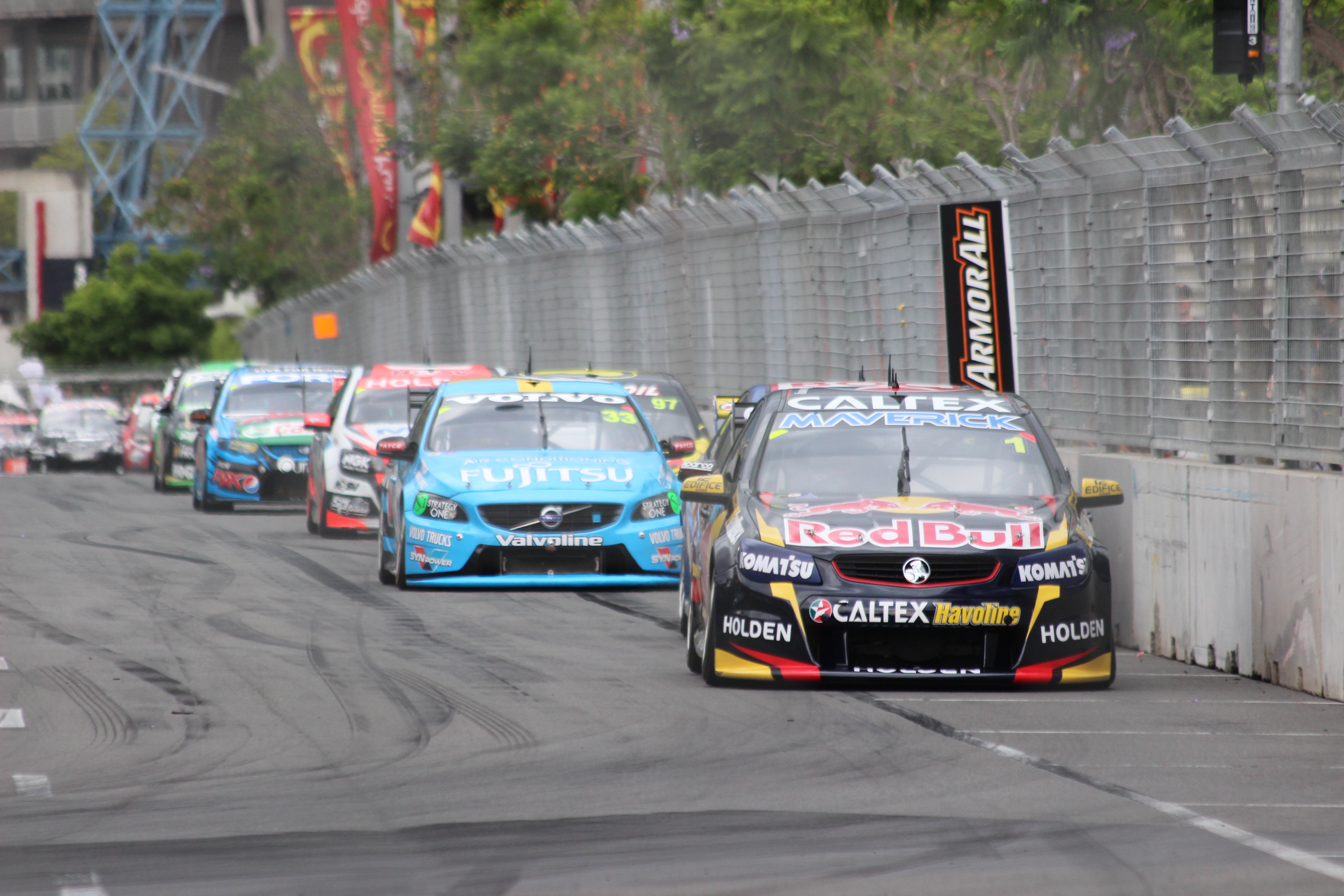
The field on lap one at the 2014 Sydney NRMA 500

=== Bathurst 1000 ===
The Bathurst 1000, also known as the "Great Race" and held in some form since 1960, is the most famous race on the Supercars calendar, as well as the longest both in terms of race distance and race time. The race is run over 161 laps of the Mount Panorama Circuit, 1,000 kilometres (620 mi) in total, taking between six and seven hours to complete. The event has historically attracted crowds of nearly 200,000 people. The Peter Brock Trophy, named after nine-time Bathurst 1000 winner Peter Brock, is awarded to the winners of the race. The trophy was introduced in 2006 following Brock's death in a crash at the Targa West rally one month prior to the race.

=== Adelaide 500 ===
The Adelaide 500, also known as the "Clipsal 500", "Superloop 500", "Vailo Adelaide 500" and "BP Adelaide Grand Final" under former sponsorship names, is the premier car race in South Australia. It is the largest V8 Supercars race in the country by crowd numbers. Beginning in 1999, the race is held in the eastern streets of the Adelaide CBD, on a reduced version of the Adelaide Street Circuit previously used by the Grand Prix. There was no race in 2021 after the contract was not renewed by Liberal premier Steven Marshall, before it was revived in 2022 with a new contract under by subsequent Labor premier Peter Malinauskas, who had pledged its return during the 2022 South Australian state election. Held over four days, the event consists of two 250 kilometre races for the V8 Supercars, and additionary practise and qualifying races. The event has several categories of races throughout the four days, including Super2 Series, Formula 5000, SuperUtes Series, Touring Car Masters, Australian GT, and the Australian Carrera Cup as well as others. The race is accompanied by live music performances, of which the likes of Kiss, Keith Urban and Robbie Williams have previously performed, as well as food, activities, and an RAAF F/A 18A Hornet display each day in the skies above the city.

=== Sandown 500 ===
The Sandown 500 was first held as a six-hour race in 1964 and has been labelled as the traditional "Bathurst warm-up" race. Like the Bathurst 1000, the Sandown 500 is run over 161 laps. Due to the shorter track length of Sandown Raceway, the race is only 500 kilometres (310 mi) and runs for between three and four hours. The Sandown 500 was not held for Supercars from 1999 to 2002 and from 2008 to 2011. During these years, the 500 kilometres (310 mi) endurance races took place at Queensland Raceway (1999–2002) and the Phillip Island Grand Prix Circuit (2008–2011).

== Media coverage ==
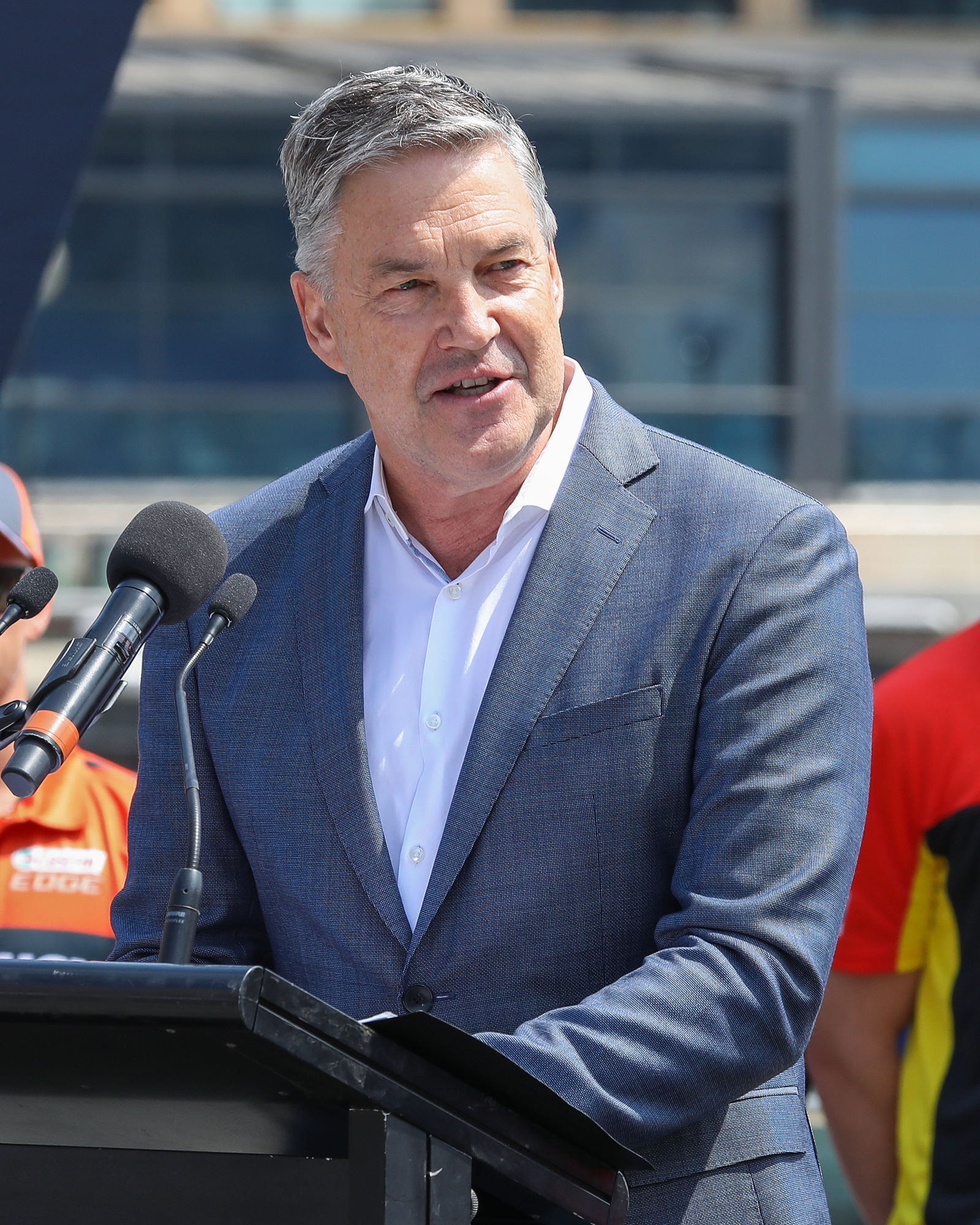
Long-time series commentator Neil Crompton at the 2020 season launch.

=== Television ===
The series is currently broadcast on Fox Sports and the Seven Network. Fox Sports shows all practice and qualifying sessions live along with the races. Seven shows only seven events live which are Adelaide, Melbourne, Townsville, Sandown, Bathurst, Gold Coast and Newcastle with the rest shown as a highlights package after the races have finished. The coverage is produced by Supercars Media, a specialist production company for Supercars Australia. Supercars Media provides the commentary for each race, with former champion and Bathurst winner Mark Skaife as lead commentator, along with Neil Crompton as expert commentator. Both Fox Sports and Seven use their own commentary team for pre- and post-race coverage. Supercars Media records the series in 1080i high-definition, with many cars carrying four or more onboard-cameras, though HD coverage is available only to subscribers of Foxtel HD.

Prior to the 1984 Australian Touring Car Championship season (ATCC), the series did not have a common TV home, splitting between ABC and Channel 7, as the track owners controlled the TV rights for their specific round.

In 1984, CAMS intervened and prevented the track owners from obtaining their own TV rights and instead negotiated a contract with the ABC. The only race that was not shown in 1984 on the ABC was the Calder Park round, as Channel 7 already had a long term deal with Calder Park.

In 1985, the coverage moved full time to Channel 7. Due to reasons unknown, the first round was missed in certain regions and was shown as highlights at the second round. This was how it was until 1996 except for events where the ATCC was a support act (Australian GP F1 - Channel 9 and Indy Cars - Channel 9 / 10 on the Gold Coast) or non-championship race (ie: ATCC Endurance Championship - Sandown 400/500 - ABC). Most races were same day delayed coverage to avoid the emptiness between ATCC and support races.

In 1996, the season was brought forward and the time between events was shortened to avoid conflicting with that year's Olympic Games in Atlanta (Channel 7 being the rights holder for the Olympics), meaning the final round was in June instead of its traditional slot of August / September.

Due to the Olympics, Channel 10 broadcast the Sandown 500 for 1996. This was considered a practice run for Channel 10.

The Bathurst 500 / 1000 was shown exclusively on Channel 7 from 1963 until 1996, and then from 1997 was packaged as part of the AVESCO TV Contract.

The V8 Supercars were broadcast on Network Ten and Fox Sports from 1997 as part of the AVESCO TV Contract.

This contract allowed simulcasting of the Channel 10 coverage on Fox Sports.

Select support events for the V8 Supercars were shown live, others were shown in Channel 10's Trackside series, which was broadcast either the following weekend or fortnight after the event.

In 2000, select races (FAI 1000) were produced and broadcast in widescreen (16:9). However, the public was not able to see this feed until it was rebroadcast on Foxtel on their Bathurst channel and when it was released to DVD in the 2020s.

In 2001, as Digital TV arrived in Australia, every race was produced and broadcast in native widescreen (16:9) on Channel 10 Digital.

For analogue TV viewers, they received a letterbox feed (excluding Round 1, which provided analogue viewers with their own feed, which was too demanding, so opted for a letterbox simulcast instead from Round 2 on-wards), while international and Fox Sports users were shown a 4:3 feed. For every Split screen (ie: going for an interview, showing pit stops, pit reporters, going onboard, etc while showing track cameras), the feeds shown were within the 4:3 frame but were in their native 16:9 widescreen format, giving analogue and international viewers a glimpse of what they were missing out on.

For 2001 Clipsal 500 and Bathurst 1000, an interactive feed was available, with the following being broadcast at the 2001 Clipsal 500:

- Digital 1 - Normal Ten Telecast (simulcast)
- Digital 2 - Multiview Channel (Bill McDonald hosting, views in cars, iso cameras, pit interviews, aerials etc)
- Digital 3 - Leaderboards

And the following were broadcast at the 2001 Bathurst 1000:

- Digital 1 - Main telecast in 16:9 widescreen (simulcast)
- Digital 2 - Alternate race view (onboards, helicopter camera, behind the leaders, leader cam (when other battles were being shown on Digital 1)
- Digital 3 - Top of the mountain camera
- Digital 4 - Leader board

Due to low viewership, this was never repeated after season 2001.

From 2002, the V8 Supercars Greatest Hits Volume 2 (to Volume 4) DVDs and from the 2003 season, the V8 Supercars and Bathurst 1000 highlight DVDs, produced by Sony Music Video, were released in native widescreen (16:9).

At the 2002 Bathurst 1000, a ticker was used to show live positions. It was moved from beside the lap counter to the bottom of the screen in 2003.

In 2003, Bigpond became the exclusive Streaming provider for Bigpond Broadband Customers only.

This included live practice, qualifying and top ten shootouts, ad free racing (delayed) as well as live onboard and telemetry from your selected driver.

This also included exclusive interviews and highlight packages.

This ended in 2007 when Supercars Australia started to produce the coverage.

In 2004, Foxtel Digital was launched and by 2005 was showing races in widescreen.

At the Bathurst 1000 in 2004, Sky Cam, which hovered above the pit lane, was introduced. The camera ran on a wire from the Pedestrian Overpass to Turn 1 and had 360 degree tilt and pan.

The camera would be used in other events after its successful run at Bathurst.

This initial contract with Channel 10 and Fox Sports ended at the conclusion of the 2006 season.

Channel 7 regained the rights from 2007 to 2012, then extended to 2014 (due to a lack of competitive tenders at the end of 2012 forcing Supercars Australia to default to Channel 7 for two more seasons). During 2013 and 2014, Channel 7's deal did not cover their production costs.

In 2007, Supercars Australia started to produce the coverage, rather than relying on the broadcasters.

While Channel 7 had the rights, Network Ten and Fox Sports continued to broadcast the series once a year for the Melbourne 400 championship races, which are a support category at the Formula One Rolex Australian Grand Prix, which was broadcast by Ten and Fox Sports. All support category races were tied up with the Formula One Australian Grand Prix broadcast rights as a package.

Then the rights were returned to Network Ten and Fox Sports from 2015 to 2020.

The deal included Channel 10 showing six events live and showing one hour highlight packages for the rest of the season.

Fox Sports would show all sessions live, ad free (during sessions only) and in HD.

In 2020, Seven Network and Foxtel signed a five-year deal worth $200 million to televise the Repco Supercars Championship from 2021 to 2025. Seven Network broadcast six rounds live and showed highlights for the rest of the season. Foxtel's deal remains the same, it showed all races live and ad free on Fox Sports.

In 2025, the calendar changing to a NASCAR playoffs style series, meant the contract that Fox Sports and Channel 7 are currently under prevents Channel 7 from showing Friday Races live (Eastern Creek, Townsville and Adelaide having Friday races), even though Channel 7 has the rights to showing these events live.

The rights for the series beyond 2025 have yet to be announced.

Ten's television series RPM, which has aired from 1997 to 2008, in 2011 and from 2015 - 2020, has covered Supercars, alongside other motorsports. From 2007 to 2014, Seven broadcast a weekly 25-minute show titled V8Xtra on non-racing weekends. The dedicated Supercars program covered news and feature items relating to the series. Since 2015, Fox Sports has broadcast a similar show, Inside Supercars, a weekly one-hour long program featuring a panel led by Rust and Mark Skaife. In the same year, Fox Sports also launched an observational show Supercars Life, featuring behind the scenes footage from race weekends and features on drivers' lives away from the track. In 2018, Inside Supercars was superseded by a new show on Fox Sports, Supercars Trackside. Instead of being filmed in a studio midweek, the show is filmed on the Thursday before and the Sunday after each race meeting at the circuit.

The television broadcast of the Bathurst 1000 has won a Logie Award for the Most Outstanding Sports Coverage seven times (Note: year won is for the prior years coverage and are shown in Bold): 1979, 1985, 1998 (nominated), 2000, 2001 (nominated), 2002 (nominated), 2006, 2007 (nominated), 2008, 2009 (nominated), 2010, 2012 (nominated), 2015 (nominated), 2017 (nominated), and most recently won in 2018 for the 2017 Bathurst 1000.

Foxtel broadcast the 2018 Bathurst 1000 in 4K resolution, the first such broadcast in Australian sport.

==== Current TV broadcasters ====
Supercars races are broadcast on the following channels:

Country	TV network	Free/pay	Coverage	Notes
**Australia**	**Seven Network**	**Free**	**Live/Highlights**	**Seven events shown live with all others shown in highlight packages.**
**Australia**	**Fox Sports**	**Pay**	**Live**	**Includes live coverage of practice, qualifying sessions and top ten shootouts.**
**New Zealand**	**Sky Sport**	**Pay**	**Live**	**Includes live coverage of practice, qualifying sessions and top ten shootouts.**
Asia	SPOTV	Pay	Live/Delayed	Only races are shown (expect Melbourne SuperSprint event)
Catalonia	Esport3 (TVC)	Free	Live/Delayed	Live online (in English), Delayed on TV (in Catalan)
Germany	Sportdigital1+	Pay	Live/Delayed	Only races shown.
Indonesia	BTV	Free	Delayed	Only races shown
Ireland	TNT Sports	Pay	Live	Only races shown.
United Kingdom	TNT Sports	Pay	Live	Only races shown.
Netherlands	Ziggo Sport	Pay	Live/Delayed	
Norway	V Sport	Pay	Live	
United States	Racer Network	Pay	Live and on Demand	Includes live coverage of races
Worldwide outside Australia and New Zealand	YouTube via SuperView	Pay	Live and on Demand	Includes live coverage of practice, qualifying sessions, and supporting races.
Vietnam	Viettel	Pay	Live	Melbourne SuperSprint events only.

=== Other media ===
The series has its own live streaming pay-per-view service, Superview. The service, which started in 2013, currently shows all races as well as qualifying sessions. In 2021 the service was brought to YouTube which shows complete broadcasts including support races. The service is not available in New Zealand and Australia due to their current broadcasting rights with Sky Sport and Fox Sports.

The series has its own website, which contains information about the series, drivers, teams and events and news articles, and a radio show, V8 Insiders. News is also featured on motorsport websites such as Speedcafe and V8Sleuth. A media deal with News Corp Australia has been in place since 2009.

=== Video games ===
Supercars have made several licensed appearances in video games, including in Codemasters' V8 Supercars series in the 2000s and Turn 10 Studios' Forza series in the 2010s. From 2011 to 2014, an online championship, sanctioned by Supercars, was contested on iRacing. In 2017, Supercars launched an eSports competition using Forza Motorsport 6 and Forza Motorsport 7, which expanded to six rounds in 2018. The Supercars Eseries moved to the iRacing platform in 2019 with championship teams including Triple Eight Race Engineering and Walkinshaw Andretti United entering teams into the series alongside eSports teams. An additional Eseries was held in mid 2020 with all championship drivers competing during the hiatus caused by the COVID-19 pandemic.

== Records ==
- **Bold** denotes drivers, teams and manufacturers who drive in the 2026 Supercars Championship.
- Italics denotes drivers who co-drive in the 2026 Supercars Championship.
- Figures accurate as of 26 November 2023 (after Race 28 of the 2023 Supercars Championship).
- Records include the Australian Touring Car Championship (1960–1998), the Shell Championship Series (1999–2001), the V8 Supercar Championship Series (2002–2010), International V8 Supercars Championship (2011–2016) and the Supercars Championship (2016–present).

=== Driver records ===
Championships
	Driver	Titles
1	(Victoria (state)) Jamie Whincup	7
2	(New South Wales) Ian Geoghegan	5
2	(Queensland) Dick Johnson	5
2	(New South Wales) Mark Skaife	5
5	(Victoria (state)) Bob Jane	4
5	(Canada) Allan Moffat	4
5	(New Zealand) Jim Richards	4
8	(Victoria (state)) Peter Brock	3
8	(Victoria (state)) Craig Lowndes	3
8	(New Zealand) Scott McLaughlin	3
8	(New Zealand) Shane van Gisbergen	3

Race wins
	Driver	Wins
1	(Victoria (state)) Jamie Whincup	124
2	(Victoria (state)) Craig Lowndes	110
3	(New South Wales) Mark Skaife	90
4	(New Zealand) Shane van Gisbergen	80
5	(Western Australia) Garth Tander	57
6	(New Zealand) Scott McLaughlin	56
7	(Victoria (state)) Peter Brock	48
8	(New South Wales) Glenn Seton	40
9	(New South Wales) Mark Winterbottom	39
10	(Canada) Allan Moffat	36

Race starts
	Driver	Starts
1	(Victoria (state)) Craig Lowndes	675
2	(Western Australia) Garth Tander	643
3	(New South Wales) Mark Winterbottom	611
4	(South Australia) Russell Ingall	589
5	(Victoria (state)) Rick Kelly	580
6	(Victoria (state)) Jason Bright	578
7	(Victoria (state)) Jamie Whincup	555
8	(Victoria (state)) **James Courtney**	542
9	(New South Wales) Todd Kelly	540
10	(Victoria (state)) **Will Davison**	533

=== Teams and Manufacturers ===
- Figures accurate as of 13 April 2026 (after Race 9 of the 2026 Supercars Championship).
- Records include the Australian Touring Car Championship (1960–1998), the Shell Championship Series (1999–2001), the V8 Supercar Championship Series (2002–2010), International V8 Supercars Championship (2011–2016) and the Supercars Championship (2016–present).

Race wins
	Team	Wins
1	**Triple Eight Race Engineering**	252
2	**Walkinshaw Andretti United**	192
3	**Dick Johnson Racing**	148
4	**Tickford Racing**	78
5	HSV Dealer Team	50
6	Gibson Motorsport	47
7	Holden Dealer Team/Advantage Racing	42
7	Glenn Seton Racing	42
9	Stone Brothers Racing	40
10	Allan Moffat Racing	33

Race wins
	Manufacturer	Wins
1	Holden	617
2	**Ford**	452
3	**Chevrolet**	65
4	Nissan	31
5	BMW	17
6	Volvo	11
7	Mazda	8
8	Jaguar	4
9	**Toyota**	3
10	Porsche	2
10	Mercedes-Benz	2

Drivers' championships by manufacturer (1960–2025)
Rank	Manufacturer	Championships
1	**Ford**	28
2	Holden	23
3=	**Chevrolet**	4
3=	Jaguar	4
5	Nissan	3
6	BMW	2
7=	Mazda	1
7=	Volvo	1

== See also ==
- Australian Touring Car Championship
- List of Australian Touring Car and V8 Supercar champions
- List of Australian Touring Car Championship races
- List of Australian Touring Car and V8 Supercar driver records
- Supercars Hall of Fame

== Bibliography ==
- West, Luke (15 July 2021). Supercars: The Holden vs Ford Era. Gelding Street Press. ISBN 978-1-925946-99-4.
