= Desert 400 =

(Bahrain) Desert 400
- Race Information
Venue	Bahrain International Circuit
Number of times held	4
First held	2006
Last held	2010
- Race Format
- Race 1
Laps	37
Distance	200 km
- Race 2
Laps	37
Distance	200 km
- Last Event (2010)
- Overall Winner
(Australia) Jamie Whincup	Triple Eight Race Engineering
- Race Winners
(Australia) Jamie Whincup	Triple Eight Race Engineering
(Australia) Jamie Whincup	Triple Eight Race Engineering

The Desert 400 was a V8 Supercar motor racing event held at the Bahrain International Circuit in Manama, Bahrain. It was held from 2006 to 2008 and in 2010.

== History ==
First held in 2006, the Desert 400 was only the second V8 Supercar championship event to be held outside Australia and New Zealand, following a single event at the Shanghai International Circuit in China in 2005. The Bahrain event was originally held in November as one of the final rounds in the season's calendar. In 2008, local Bahrain driver Fahad Al Musalam made a guest appearance in the event for Team Kiwi Racing. The 2009 event did not take place, as the scheduled event in November 2009 was postponed to February 2010 in order to link up with the new Yas V8 400 event, held in nearby Abu Dhabi.

The racing itself was dominated by Ford Performance Racing and Triple Eight Race Engineering, each winning two events at the track. Jamie Whincup was the only driver to win multiple events at the circuit, winning in 2008 and 2010 in a Triple Eight prepared Ford and Holden respectively.

=== Demise ===
In late 2010, V8 Supercars announced the event was to be discontinued for 2011, citing the congested nature of the circuit's early season schedule. V8 Supercar would maintain a presence in the Middle East until 2012, at Abu Dhabi, however the championship no longer features an event in the region.

== Circuit ==
The Paddock layout of Bahrain International Circuit, used from 2006 to 2008 at the Desert 400.

The series used the Bahrain International Circuit's shorter Paddock layout for the series' first three visits. For the final Desert 400 in 2010, the addition of GP2 Asia to the V8 Supercar weekend led to the event using the full Grand Prix layout for the first time, a layout normally used in the Bahrain Grand Prix.

== Winners ==
Year	Driver	Team	Car	Report
2006	(Australia) Jason Bright	Ford Performance Racing	Ford BF Falcon	Report
2007	(Australia) Mark Winterbottom	Ford Performance Racing	Ford BF Falcon	Report
2008	(Australia) Jamie Whincup	Triple Eight Race Engineering	Ford BF Falcon	Report
2009	not held due to being postponed to February 2010 to have the race link with the 2010 Yas V8 400 in the schedule.			
2010	(Australia) Jamie Whincup	Triple Eight Race Engineering	Holden VE Commodore	Report

== Multiple winners ==
=== By driver ===
Wins	Driver	Years
2	(Australia) Jamie Whincup	2008, 2010

=== By team ===
Wins	Team
2	Ford Performance Racing
2	Triple Eight Race Engineering

=== By manufacturer ===
Wins	Manufacturer
3	Ford

== Event sponsors ==
- 2008: Gulf Air

== See also ==
- Yas V8 400
- List of Australian Touring Car Championship races
