= Yas Marina Circuit V8 Supercar Event =

V8 Supercar racing event

(United Arab Emirates) Yas Marina Circuit V8 Supercar Event
- Race Information
Venue	Yas Marina Circuit
Number of times held	3
First held	2010
Last held	2012
- Race Format
- Race 1
Laps	12
Distance	70 km
- Race 2
Laps	12
Distance	70 km
- Race 3
Laps	12
Distance	70 km
- Last Event (2012)
- Overall Winner
(Australia) Jamie Whincup	Triple Eight Race Engineering
- Race Winners
(Australia) Jamie Whincup	Triple Eight Race Engineering
(Australia) Jamie Whincup	Triple Eight Race Engineering
(Australia) Jamie Whincup	Triple Eight Race Engineering

The Yas Marina Circuit V8 Supercar Event was a V8 Supercars motor racing event held at the Yas Marina Circuit in Abu Dhabi, United Arab Emirates. The event was held from 2010 to 2012.

== History ==
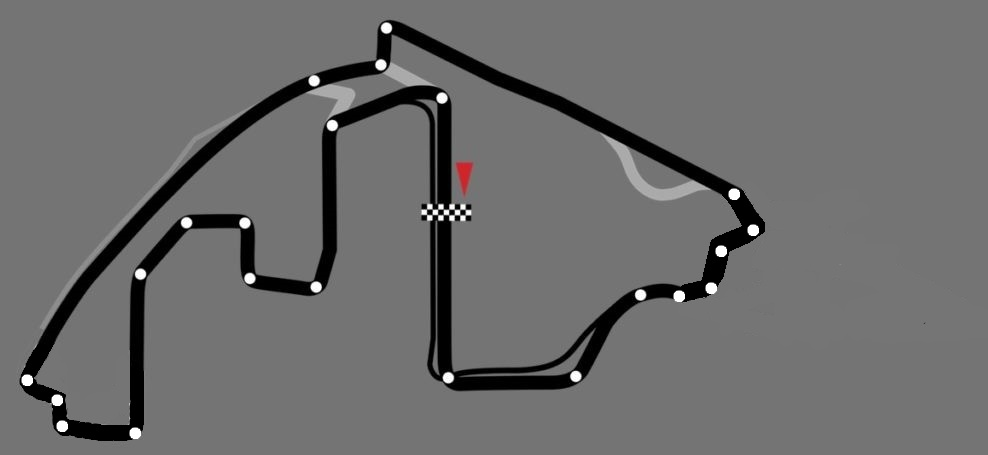
Corkscrew layout was used in 2010 and 2011

The inaugural Yas V8 400 in 2010 was the opening event of the 2010 V8 Supercar Championship Series, becoming the first, and so far only, event outside Australia to open a championship season. The 2010 event was held as the first part of a double-header in the Middle East to start the season, which included the Desert 400 at the Bahrain International Circuit one week later.

The first event at Yas Marina Circuit was won by Jamie Whincup, who dominated the weekend, winning both of the races. Whincup also was the overall winner of the second event in 2011, taking one race win with James Courtney taking the other following a fortuitous safety car. Whincup again dominated in the final year of the event in 2012, winning all three races.

=== Layout ===
For 2010 and 2011, the race used a shorter version of the Abu Dhabi Grand Prix track used for Formula One, with a "corkscrew" section between Turn 3 and halfway down the back straight. This shortened the track to 4.7 km, with lap times of approximately 2 minutes. The 2012 race moved to the full 5.5 km Grand Prix circuit, as the V8 Supercars event was part of the support bill to the 2012 Abu Dhabi Grand Prix weekend.

=== Format ===
In 2010 and 2011, the event featured two 200 km races across the weekend. For 2012, the race format was shortened to three 66 km sprint races. These featured lunchtime starts to allow primetime Australian television broadcasts, and not to clash with the Formula One schedule.

=== Demise ===
The event was initially scheduled to continue into 2013, once again supporting the Abu Dhabi Grand Prix. However, with the Grand Prix support bill expanding to include rounds of the GP2 Series and GP3 Series championships, there was no longer space for the V8 Supercars, and the round was removed from the 2013 calendar.

== Winners ==
Year	Driver	Team	Car	Report
2010	(Australia) Jamie Whincup	Triple Eight Race Engineering	Holden VE Commodore	Report
2011	(Australia) Jamie Whincup	Triple Eight Race Engineering	Holden VE Commodore	Report
2012	(Australia) Jamie Whincup	Triple Eight Race Engineering	Holden VE Commodore	Report

== Multiple winners ==
=== By driver ===
Wins	Driver	Years
3	(Australia) Jamie Whincup	2010, 2011, 2012

=== By team ===
Wins	Team
3	Triple Eight Race Engineering

=== By manufacturer ===
Wins	Manufacturer
3	Holden

== Event names ==
- 2010–11: Yas V8 400
- 2012: Yas Marina Circuit V8 Supercar Event

== See also ==
- Desert 400
- List of Australian Touring Car Championship races
