= Sandown SuperSprint =

Motor racing event in Australia

(Victoria (state)) Sandown SuperSprint
- Race Information
| Venue | Sandown Raceway |
| Number of times held | 38 |
| First held | 1965 |
| Last held | 2026 |
- Race Format
- Race 1
| Laps | 79 |
| Distance | 250 km |
- Race 2
| Laps | 79 |
| Distance | 250 km |
- Last Event (2026)
- Overall Winner
| (Australia) Matt Payne | Grove Racing |
- Race Winners
| (Australia) Brodie Kostecki | Dick Johnson Racing |
| (New Zealand) Matt Payne | Grove Racing |

The Sandown SuperSprint was a Supercars motor racing event held at Sandown Raceway in Melbourne, Victoria, Australia. The event was a semi-regular part of the Supercars Championship—and its previous incarnations, the Australian Touring Car Championship, Shell Championship Series and V8 Supercars Championship between 1965 and 2011, and returned to the championship in 2021.

== Format ==
The event was staged over a three-day weekend, from Friday to Sunday. Three thirty-minute practice sessions were held, two on Friday, one of them was a co-driver session, and one on Saturday. Saturday featured a three-part qualifying session which decides the grid positions for the following 110 kilometre race. Two separated ten-minute qualifying sessions were held on Sunday, which decided the grid for the following 110 km races.

== History ==
Opened in 1962, Sandown Raceway has traditionally been known as the host of endurance races, the first of which was held in 1964, an event which later evolved into the Sandown 500 event. As well as this, Sandown has a long history of hosting sprint rounds of the championship with the circuit hosting the most rounds in championship history. Sandown held its first championship sprint round in 1965, as the only event of the 1965 Australian Touring Car Championship. The race was won by Norm Beechey, who won by over a lap despite starting from towards the back of the grid after mechanical problems in qualifying. Sandown would not hold another championship event until 1970, when the series had expanded to seven rounds.

Since then, in various forms and with the exception of 1975, 1990 and 1993, Sandown has been included in every running of the Australian Touring Car Championship, which later became known as V8 Supercars. From 1972 to 1974, Allan Moffat won three consecutive event wins at the circuit, while in 1976 and 1977 Sandown hosted both a sprint round and the Sandown 500 as part of each championship. In 1978, five-time champion Ian Geoghegan won his last championship round in a Bob Jane Racing entry. Throughout the 1980s, Dick Johnson tied Moffat as the most successful driver at the event with four wins. Dick Johnson's eponymous team won three further events in 1992, 2000 and 2010. In 2000, Steven Ellery won his only career race at the event. The 2001 and 2002 events were the final events of each championship, however in both years the championship had already been decided by the time of the Sandown round. In 2001, Todd Kelly scored his first championship round win. In 2002, Marcos Ambrose gave the Ford AU Falcon a round win in the last event of its largely unsuccessful era as the pre-eminent Ford model.

Meanwhile, in 1999 the annual 500 kilometre endurance race left Sandown and moved to Queensland Raceway, with the endurance events also joining the championship calendar for the first time since 1977. With the 500 kilometre endurance race and the Bathurst 1000 now regular fixtures of the championship, when the Sandown 500 returned to the calendar from 2003 to 2007, the sprint round became obsolete. The sprint round then returned from 2008 to 2011 in the period in which the Phillip Island 500 replaced Sandown's endurance race. In the final sprint round to date in 2011, Will Davison won the round despite only finishing fourth and third in a rain-affected weekend.

In 2020, the 500 was again scheduled to be moved, this time to The Bend Motorsport Park, which itself was not held due to the COVID-19 pandemic. Because of this, Sandown was initially scheduled to host its first sprint event since 2011, but the event was also later cancelled altogether due to the COVID-19 pandemic. Sandown was initially given reserve status on the 2021 calendar, and was then scheduled to replace the Melbourne 400 after the postponement of the 2021 Australian Grand Prix. Shane van Gisbergen won all three races, including the first from 17th on the grid, only two weeks after breaking his collarbone in a mountain biking accident.

== Winners ==
| Year | Driver | Team | Car | Report |
|---|---|---|---|---|
| 1965 | (Australia) Norm Beechey | Neptune Racing Team | Ford Mustang | Report |
| 1966 – 1969 | not held | | | |
| 1970 | (Australia) Norm Beechey | Beechey Shell Racing Team | Holden Monaro HT GTS350 | |
| 1971 | (Australia) Bob Jane | Bob Jane Racing | Chevrolet Camaro ZL-1 | |
| 1972 | (Canada) Allan Moffat | Allan Moffat Racing | Ford Boss 302 Mustang | |
| 1973 | (Canada) Allan Moffat | Ford Works Team | Ford XY Falcon GTHO Phase III | |
| 1974 | (Canada) Allan Moffat | Allan Moffat Racing | Ford XA Falcon GT Hardtop | |
| 1975 | event cancelled | | | |
| 1976^{1} | (Australia) Colin Bond | Holden Dealer Team | Holden LH Torana SL/R 5000 L34 | |
| 1977^{1} | (Canada) Allan Moffat | Allan Moffat Racing | Ford XB Falcon GT | |
| 1978 | (Australia) Ian Geoghegan | Bob Jane Racing | Holden LX Torana A9X | |
| 1979 | (Australia) Bob Morris | Ron Hodgson Motors | Holden LX Torana SS 5000 A9X | |
| 1980 | (Australia) Kevin Bartlett | Nine Network Racing Team | Chevrolet Camaro Z28 | |
| 1981 | (Australia) Dick Johnson | Dick Johnson Racing | Ford XD Falcon | |
| 1982 | (Australia) Dick Johnson | Dick Johnson Racing | Ford XD Falcon | |
| 1983 | (Australia) Allan Grice | Roadways Racing | Holden VH Commodore SS | |
| 1984 | (Australia) Peter Brock | Holden Dealer Team | Holden VH Commodore SS | |
| 1985 | (Australia) Peter Brock | Holden Dealer Team | Holden VK Commodore | |
| 1986 | (Australia) George Fury | Gibson Motorsport | Nissan Skyline DR30 RS | |
| 1987 | (Australia) Glenn Seton | Gibson Motorsport | Nissan Skyline DR30 RS | |
| 1988 | (Australia) Dick Johnson | Dick Johnson Racing | Ford Sierra RS500 | |
| 1989 | (Australia) Dick Johnson | Dick Johnson Racing | Ford Sierra RS500 | |
| 1990 | not held | | | |
| 1991 | (New Zealand) Jim Richards | Gibson Motorsport | Nissan Skyline BNR32 GT-R | |
| 1992 | (Australia) John Bowe | Dick Johnson Racing | Ford Sierra RS500 | |
| 1993 | not held | | | |
| 1994 | (Australia) Mark Skaife | Gibson Motorsport | Holden VP Commodore | Report |
| 1995 | (Australia) Larry Perkins | Perkins Engineering | Holden VR Commodore | Report |
| 1996 | (Australia) Craig Lowndes | Holden Racing Team | Holden VR Commodore | |
| 1997 | (Australia) Glenn Seton | Glenn Seton Racing | Ford EL Falcon | |
| 1998 | (Australia) Craig Lowndes | Holden Racing Team | Holden VS Commodore | |
| 1999 | (Australia) Mark Skaife | Holden Racing Team | Holden VT Commodore | Report |
| 2000 | (New Zealand) Paul Radisich | Dick Johnson Racing | Ford AU Falcon | |
| 2001 | (Australia) Todd Kelly | Kmart Racing Team | Holden VX Commodore | Report |
| 2002 | (Australia) Marcos Ambrose | Stone Brothers Racing | Ford AU Falcon | Report |
| 2003 – 2007 | not held ^{2} | | | |
| 2008 | (Australia) Jamie Whincup | Triple Eight Race Engineering | Ford BF Falcon | Report |
| 2009 | (Australia) Will Davison | Holden Racing Team | Holden VE Commodore | Report |
| 2010 | (Australia) James Courtney | Dick Johnson Racing | Ford FG Falcon | |
| 2011 | (Australia) Will Davison | Ford Performance Racing | Ford FG Falcon | |
| 2012 – 2019 | not held ^{2} | | | |
| 2020 | not held due to COVID-19 pandemic | | | |
| 2021 | (New Zealand) Shane van Gisbergen | Triple Eight Race Engineering | Holden ZB Commodore | |
| 2022 | (New Zealand) Shane van Gisbergen | Triple Eight Race Engineering | Holden ZB Commodore | |
| 2023 – 2024 | not held | | | |
| 2025 | (Australia) Chaz Mostert | Walkinshaw Andretti United | Mustang S650 | |

Notes

- ^1 – In 1976 and 1977, Sandown Raceway also hosted a second championship round, the Hang Ten 400.
- ^2 – From 2003 to 2007 and from 2012 to 2019, Sandown Raceway hosted the Sandown 500 as a championship round.

== Multiple winners ==
=== By driver ===
| Wins | Driver | Years |
|---|---|---|
| 4 | (Canada) Allan Moffat | 1972, 1973, 1974, 1977 |
| 4 | (Australia) Dick Johnson | 1981, 1982, 1988, 1989 |
| 2 | (Australia) Norm Beechey | 1965, 1970 |
| 2 | (Australia) Peter Brock | 1984, 1985 |
| 2 | (Australia) Glenn Seton | 1987, 1997 |
| 2 | (Australia) Craig Lowndes | 1996, 1998 |
| 2 | (Australia) Mark Skaife | 1994, 1999 |
| 2 | (Australia) Will Davison | 2009, 2011 |
| 2 | (New Zealand) Shane van Gisbergen | 2021, 2022 |

=== By team ===
| Wins | Team |
|---|---|
| 7 | Dick Johnson Racing |
| 4 | Gibson Motorsport |
| 4 | Holden Racing Team |
| 3 | Allan Moffat Racing |
| 3 | Holden Dealer Team |
| 3 | Triple Eight Race Engineering |
| 2 | Bob Jane Racing |

=== By manufacturer ===
| Wins | Manufacturer |
|---|---|
| 16 | Ford |
| 16 | Holden |
| 3 | Nissan |
| 2 | Chevrolet |

== Event names and sponsors ==
- 1965, 1972–74, 1976–82, 1984, 1987–89, 1991–92, 1994–2001: Sandown
- 1970: Sterling Southern 60
- 1971: Marlboro Southern Sixty
- 1983: International Motor Show Trophy
- 1985: Pye Audio Round 2
- 1986: Castrol Challenge
- 2002: Betta Electrical V8 Ultimate
- 2008: Midas 400
- 2009–11: Norton 360 Sandown Challenge
- 2021–22: Penrite Oil Sandown SuperSprint

== See also ==
- List of Australian Touring Car Championship races
