= 1964 Australian Touring Car Championship =

Motor racing competition

Seasons
- ← 1963 1965 →

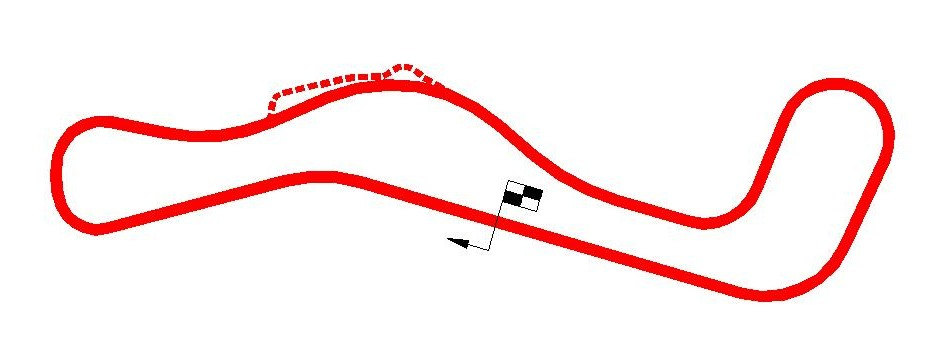
Layout of the Lakeside International Raceway

The 1964 Australian Touring Car Championship was a CAMS sanctioned national motor racing title for drivers of Appendix J Touring Cars and Group E Series Production Touring Cars. The championship, which was the fifth Australian Touring Car Championship, was contested over a single race staged at the Lakeside International Raceway in Queensland, Australia, on 26 July 1964. The race was won by Ian Geoghegan, the first of his five Australian Touring Car Championship titles. Geoghegan drove a Ford Cortina GT in what was the first Australian Touring Car Championship victory for a Ford driver and the first time that a Jaguar driver did not win the title.

== Race ==
Lakeside's proximity to Brisbane ensured a large crowd as for the first time the race appeared wide open with many fancied runners. The Jaguars had faded (although Bob Jane's Mark 2 was a potential front runner) partly due to the rise of the Ford Cortina in either its GT specification or the Lotus-tuned version, of which only Jim McKeown's was ready in time for the race. For the first time Holden was a front runner with the S4 version of the EH. In the lead up to the race Ian Geoghegan rolled and destroyed his Cortina and a factory test car was driven up from Melbourne to get him back into the race.

Qualifying consisted of four ten lap heats, with cars sorted based on engine capacity. Only twenty places were available on the grid, with times from the heats deciding which drivers qualified for the race. The first heat, for cars up to 1300cc, was won by Peter Manton, just ahead of Brian Foley and Ron Clarke. John French, Steve Harvey, Richard Arblaster and Brendan Hare also qualified. The second heat, for cars between 1300 and 2000cc, saw McKeown take victory of Geoghegan after the two collided early on. Harry Firth, Glyn Scott and Brian Michelmore were the other qualifiers. The third heat was for cars between 2000 and 2600cc and was won by Barry Seton ahead of Des West, Bob Lidgate and Malcolm Bailey. Bruce Neville and John Reilly both crashed during the heat, while Warren Weldon suffered gearbox problems. The final heat was for cars over 2600cc. Jane took an easy win ahead of Brian Muir, Norm Beechey and Clem Smith. Despite qualifying for the race, Lidgate withdrew to allow Weldon on to the grid. McKeown gained pole position ahead of Geoghegan, Jane, Muir, Beechey and Manton.

Muir, Jane and Beechey made the best of the start and took up the top three positions ahead of Geoghegan and McKeown. McKeown was able to pass Geoghegan for fourth by the end of the first lap, with the top five pulling away from the rest of the field. McKeown then passed Beechey and Jane on the next two laps to move into second, while Smith crashed on lap 2. Michelmore retired with mechanical problems on lap 5. McKeown took the lead from Muir on lap 7, while Beechey and Geoghegan were battling hard for fourth. Firth had dropped eight seconds behind the top five at this stage, while Weldon had made his way from the back of the grid to thirteenth.

Jane moved into second place on lap 11 and took the lead on the following lap when McKeown made a mistake and dropped to third behind Muir. Weldon locked a brake on lap 15, hitting the bank and rolling his car on its side just short of where Smith had crashed earlier. Five laps later, McKeown, under pressure from Beechey, clipped Weldon's car and spun into the fence. Meanwhile, Jane was building a lead over Muir, which got out to over 100 metres, before his car began suffering from a clutch problem on lap 31. Muir took the lead and Geoghegan and Beechey both passed Jane on the following lap. Muir led for the next six laps until his left-rear tyre went soft and he pitted for a replacement. While fetching the spare wheel, one crewman accidentally handed his motel keys to another crewman trying to open the boot lid. The delay cost Muir two laps and his chance of victory.

Beechey held the lead under increasing pressure from Geoghegan, who was able to take the lead on lap 43. Geoghegan held on for the last seven laps to take the win, just 1.2 seconds ahead of Beechey. Jane, despite his clutch problems, finished in third, thirty seconds behind, while Foley and Manton were the last finishers on the lead lap. Scott, Muir, French, Seton and Firth completed the top ten.

== Results ==
Class winners are indicated by bold text.

| Pos. | Class | No. | Driver | Entrant | Car | Laps | Time/Retired |
|---|---|---|---|---|---|---|---|
| 1 | 1301–2000cc | 5 | (Australia) Ian Geoghegan | Total Team | Ford Cortina Mark I GT | 50 | 58:29.5 |
| 2 | Over 2600cc | 4 | (Australia) Norm Beechey | Neptune Racing Team | Holden EH Special S4 | 50 | +1.2 |
| 3 | Over 2600cc | 7 | (Australia) Bob Jane | Autoland Australia | Jaguar Mark 2 4.1 | 50 | +30.8 |
| 4 | 1001–1300cc | 8 | (Australia) Brian Foley | P&R Williams Pty Ltd | Morris Cooper S | 50 | +44.9 |
| 5 | 1001–1300cc | 18 | (Australia) Peter Manton | Neptune Racing Team | Morris Cooper S | 50 | |
| 6 | 1301–2000cc | 25 | (Australia) Glyn Scott | Max Volkers Racing Team | Ford Cortina Mark I GT | 49 | +1 lap |
| 7 | Over 2600cc | 1 | (Australia) Brian Muir | Scuderia Veloce Pty Ltd | Holden EH Special S4 | 49 | +1 lap |
| 8 | 1001–1300cc | 76 | (Australia) John French | Peter Uscinski Pty Ltd | Morris Cooper S | 48 | +2 laps |
| 9 | 2001–2600cc | 51 | (Australia) Barry Seton | BP Boomerang Service Station | Holden 48-215 | 48 | +2 laps |
| 10 | 1301–2000cc | 81 | (Australia) Harry Firth | Ford Motor Company of Australia | Ford Cortina Mark I GT | 47 | +3 laps |
| 11 | 1001–1300cc | 17 | (Malaysia) Richard Arblaster | K.B. Nicholson Motors | Austin Cooper S | 47 | +3 laps |
| 12 | Up to 1000cc | 28 | (Australia) Steve Harvey | K.B. Nicholson Motors | Morris Cooper | 40 | +10 laps |
| 13 | 2001–2600cc | 10 | (Australia) Malcolm Bailey | Malcolm S Bailey | Ford Zephyr | 37 | +13 laps |
| 14 | Up to 1000cc | 47 | (Australia) Brendan Hare | Brendan Hare | Renault 750 | 32 | +18 laps |
| Ret | 1001–1300cc | 14 | (Australia) Ron Clarke | Scuderia Veloce Pty Ltd | Morris Cooper S | 43 | Accident |
| Ret | 2001–2600cc | 27 | (Australia) Des West | Waggott Engineering Pty Ltd | Holden 48-215 | 37 | Engine |
| Ret | 1301–2000cc | 3 | (Australia) Jim McKeown | Neptune Racing Team | Ford Cortina Mark I Lotus | 19 | Accident |
| Ret | 2001–2600cc | 91 | (Australia) Warren Weldon | Waggott Engineering Pty Ltd | Holden 48-215 | 14 | Accident |
| Ret | 1301–2000cc | 67 | (Australia) Brian Michelmore | Brian Michelmore | Ford Cortina Mark I GT | 4 | Mechanical |
| Ret | Over 2600cc | 46 | (Australia) Clem Smith | Clem Smith Motors | Chrysler Valiant RV1 | 1 | Accident |
| DNS | 2001–2600cc | 75 | (Australia) Bob Lidgate | Bob Lidgate | Holden | | Withdrew^{1} |

Notes:

- ^1 Bob Lidgate originally qualified for the race but withdrew his entry to allow Warren Weldon, who had gearbox troubles in his qualifying heat, to start the race.

== Statistics ==
- Pole position: Jim McKeown
- Fastest lap: Bob Jane, 1:08.6 (126.68 km/h)
- Race distance: 50 laps, 120.70 km
- Average speed: 123.81 km/h
