= Brian Foley (racing driver) =

Brian Patrick Foley (born 1934) is an Australian retired racing driver. He was active from the late 1950s through to 1974. Foley competed in Touring Car, GT and Sports Sedan categories and also contested numerous production car endurance races. His career highlights included a victory in the 1965 Lowood 4 Hour, second place in the 1967 Australian Touring Car Championship and a third-place finish in the 1965 Armstrong 500, all three attained driving a Morris Cooper S.

== Early career ==
Foley started racing in the late 1950s, subsequently driving a variety of cars from the British Motor Corporation including Austin A30, Austin A40 Farina, Austin Lancer, Austin-Healey Sprite and Morris Cooper S. He placed ninth in Class C in the 1960 Armstrong 500 at Phillip Island driving an Austin Lancer for the B.M.C. works team. The following year, Foley placed third in the 1961 Australian GT Championship driving an Austin-Healey Sprite.

== Australian Touring Car Championship ==
Foley contested the Australian Touring Car Championship in 1960, 1964, 1965, 1967, 1968, 1969, 1970 and 1971. His best finish was a second place in 1967 driving a Morris Cooper S.

== Bathurst 1000 ==
Foley contested the Bathurst 1000 (and forerunners) each year from 1960 to 1971 and again in 1974. Highlights included a win in Class A in the 1961 Armstrong 500 driving a Studebaker Lark and third outright (and a Class C win) in the 1965 Armstrong 500 in a Morris Cooper S.

== Results ==
Year	Championship	Position	Car	Entrant
1960	Australian Touring Car Championship	1st in Class	Austin A40 Farina	Kinsley Pty Ltd
1960	Australian GT Championship	12th	Kinsley Sprite	Kinsley Motors
1961	Australian GT Championship	3rd	Austin-Healey Sprite	B Foley
1962	Australian GT Championship	5th	Lotus Elite	B Foley
1963	Australian GT Championship	4th	Austin-Healey Sprite Mark IIa	P&R Williams
1964	Australian Touring Car Championship	4th	Morris Cooper S	P&R Williams Pty Ltd
1965	Australian Touring Car Championship	15th	Morris Cooper S	
1967	Australian Touring Car Championship	2nd	Morris Cooper S	Brian Foley Motors
1970	Australian Touring Car Championship	5th	Porsche 911S	Chesterfield Filter Racing
1971	Australian Touring Car Championship	8th	Alfa Romeo GTAm	Chesterfield Filter Racing
