= 1970 Australian Touring Car Championship =

Motor racing competition

Seasons
- ← 1969 1971 →

The 1970 Australian Touring Car Championship was a CAMS-sanctioned motor racing title for drivers of Group C Improved Production Touring Cars and Group E Series Production Touring Cars. The title, which was the 11th Australian Touring Car Championship, began at Calder Park Raceway on 22 March 1970 and ended at Symmons Plains Raceway on 15 November after seven heats.

The 1970 ATCC saw Norm Beechey drive his Holden Monaro HT GTS350 to victory over the Porsche 911S of teammate Jim McKeown. Finishing in third and fourth place were the Ford Mustangs of Bob Jane and four-time defending champion Ian Geoghegan.

Allan Moffat's victory in the opening round at Calder Park created history as the Canadian became the first non-Australian born driver to win an ATCC race. It was the first of an eventual 32 ATCC round wins for Moffat before his final win in Round 3 of the 1984 championship at Wanneroo Park.

== Drivers ==
The following drivers competed in the 1970 championship. The list is not exhaustive.

Entrant	Car	No.	Driver
Geoghegan's Sporty Cars	Ford Mustang	1; 31	(Australia) Ian Geoghegan
Peter Manton Shell Racing Team	Morris Cooper S	2; 21	(Australia) Peter Manton
Jim McKeown Shell Racing Team	Porsche 911S	3; 7	(Australia) Jim McKeown
Bob Jane Shell Racing Team	Ford Mustang	3; 6; 7; 27	(Australia) Bob Jane
Norm Beechey Shell Racing Team	Holden HT Monaro GTS350	4; 24	(Australia) Norm Beechey
B. S. Stillwell & Co. P/L	Ford Escort Mark I Twin Cam	5; 6	(Australia) Graham Ritter
Scuderia Veloce	Porsche 911S	5; 6; 34	(Australia) Bill Brown
Chesterfield Filter Racing	Porsche 911S	8	(Australia) Brian Foley
Team Coca-Cola A.M.R.	Ford Boss 302 Mustang; Ford XW Falcon GTHO Phase II	9; 41	(Canada) Allan Moffat
Chris Brauer	Ford Mustang	10; 11	(Australia) Chris Brauer
B. J. Auto Service P/L	Morris Cooper S	10; 66	(Australia) Bob Brown
Indianapolis Speed Shop	Chevrolet Chevy II Nova	14	(Australia) John Kay
	Ford Escort Mark I Twin Cam	14	(Australia) Garth Wigston
Alto Ford P/L	Ford Escort Mark I Twin Cam	15	(Australia) Bob Holden
	Volvo 142S	15	(Australia) Gerry Lister
Terry Robertson Motors	Holden HK Monaro GTS327	11	(Australia) Bruce Rae
Bryan Thomson Racing	Chevrolet Camaro SS	17	(Australia) Bryan Thomson
Dick Johnson Shell Racing Team	Holden LC Torana GTR	22	(Australia) Dick Johnson
	Holden EH	23	(Australia) Herb Taylor
John Humphrey	Austin Cooper S	25	(Australia) John Humphrey
	Morris Cooper	25	(Australia) Jim Smith
	Ford Falcon	28	(Australia) Colin Noble
Bob Inglis	Ford Cortina	29	(Australia) Bob Inglis
	Morris Cooper S	29	(Australia) Rick Radford
	Holden Monaro	32	(Australia) Lawrie Nelson
Shell Racing Team	Ford Cortina Lotus	33	(Australia) Malcolm Nancarrow
Ian Hindmarsh Motors	Ford Cortina Mark I Lotus	34	(Australia) Bill Fanning
	Morris Cooper S	34	(Australia) Paul Hudson
	Holden	35	(Australia) Garry Rogers
	Holden	36	(Australia) George Spilio
	Morris Cooper S	36	(Australia) Robin Bessant
	Morris Cooper	42	(Australia) Malcolm Brewster
T. Calvert	Ford Mustang	43	(Australia) Tony Calvert
	Morris Cooper	44	(Australia) Digby Cooke
	Toyota Corolla	47	(Australia) Robert Davies
British Leyland Racing Team	Morris Cooper S	49	(Australia) John French
Terry Allan	Chevrolet Camaro SS	50	(Australia) Terry Allan
D. Elliott	Ford Mustang	51	(Australia) Robin Pare
	Morris Cooper S	52	(Australia) Jeff Leighton
	Toyota Corolla	54	(Australia) Bill Brenchley
	Toyota Corolla	55	(Australia) Ian Brown
	Morris Cooper S	56	(Australia) Phil Webb
	Morris Cooper S	62	(Australia) Ted Brewster
John Lewis	Holden LC Torana	64	(Australia) John Lewis
	Morris Cooper S	64	(Australia) Anthony Bishop
	Morris Cooper S	64	(Australia) Tony Watts
	Datsun 1600	65	(Australia) Barry Tapsall
	Ford Cortina Lotus	65	(Australia) Norm Watts
	Morris Cooper S	67	(Australia) Barrie Broomhall
	Holden	68	(Australia) Norm Gown
	Morris Cooper S	70	(Australia) Frank Hunt
	Datsun 1600	71	(Australia) John Roxburgh
Bob Collison	Morris Cooper S	110	(Australia) Bob Collinson
	Morris Cooper	79	(Australia) Robert Kent
	Morris Cooper	79	(Australia) Bob Tweedie
	Morris Cooper S	81	(Australia) Robert Wilson
	Toyota Corolla	82	(Australia) Bill Evans
	Morris Cooper	82	(Australia) Bruce Jones
	Morris Cooper S	85	(Australia) Ross Ambrose
	Ford Escort Mark I Twin Cam	86	(Australia) John Bassett
	Ford Escort Mark I Twin Cam	89	(Australia) Richard Knight
	Holden	92	(Australia) Peter Peters
	Morris Cooper S	94	(Australia) G. Finen
	Alfa Romeo 1750 GTV	94	(Australia) Doug Gardiner
	Morris Cooper	95	(Australia) Ken Miller
	Datsun	96	(Australia) Don Jenkins
	Hillman Imp	97	(Australia) Roger Withers
	Ford Escort Mark I Twin Cam	98	(Australia) Andrew McComb
Graham Collier	Morris Cooper S	99	(Australia) Phil Barnes
	Ford XW Falcon GTHO Phase I		(Australia) Roy Griffiths
	Holden HT Monaro GTS350		(Australia) Nick Petrilli

== Calendar ==
The championship was contested over a series of seven heats.

Heat	Race name	Circuit	Location	Date	Winner	Entrant
1	(Victoria (state)) Calder	Calder Park Raceway	Melbourne, Victoria	22 March	Allan Moffat	Team Coca-Cola A.M.R.
2	(New South Wales) Bathurst	Mount Panorama Circuit	Bathurst, New South Wales	30 March	Norm Beechey	Norm Beechey Shell Racing Team
3	(Victoria (state)) Sterling Southern 60	Sandown Raceway	Melbourne, Victoria	19 April	Norm Beechey	Norm Beechey Shell Racing Team
4	(South Australia) South Australian Touring Car Championship	Mallala Motor Sport Park	Mallala, South Australia	16 June	Ian Geoghegan	Geoghegan's Sporty Cars
5	(New South Wales) AJC Trophy	Warwick Farm Raceway	Sydney, New South Wales	12 July	Jim McKeown	Jim McKeown Shell Racing Team
6	(Queensland) Lakeside	Lakeside International Raceway	Brisbane, Queensland	26 July	Norm Beechey	Norm Beechey Shell Racing Team
7	(Tasmania) Tasmanian Touring Car Championship	Symmons Plains Racing Circuit	Launceston, Tasmania	15 November	Jim McKeown	Jim McKeown Shell Racing Team

== Race summaries ==
=== Calder ===
Allan Moffat took pole position for the opening round of the championship ahead of Ian Geoghegan and Bob Jane. Geoghegan challenged Moffat for the lead at the first corner but Moffat held the position. Norm Beechey, starting down the order, made his way into fourth place on the first lap before passing both Jane and Geoghegan at the beginning of lap 2. He eventually passed Moffat for the lead before making slight contact with a lapped car, forcing him to pull over to the side of the track and pull the guard off of his front tyre.

Jane had already made a pit stop and Geoghegan lost a rear wheel while Beechey was stopped, leaving Moffat with a sizeable lead. Meanwhile, the Porsches of Brian Foley and Jim McKeown were battling for second place. Beechey had enough pace to catch Moffat and retake the lead on lap 33 before he had to pit to change a front tyre. Moffat cruised to an easy victory from there, with Foley finishing in second place ahead of McKeown, Jane, Bob Brown and Bill Fanning. Beechey returned to the track with three laps left and set a new lap record of 47.7 seconds.

=== Bathurst ===
Ian Geoghegan took pole position with a time of 2:29.9, 1.4 seconds clear of Bob Jane. Allan Moffat completed the front row while Norm Beechey and Brian Foley started on the second row ahead of Jim McKeown and Chris Brauer. Beechey used the straight-line speed of his Holden Monaro to take the lead going up Mountain Straight. After dropping to seventh off the line, Moffat made his way back up to third behind Beechey and Geoghegan during the first lap before both Geoghegan and Moffat passed Beechey going down Conrod Straight. Geoghegan and Moffat pulled away from the rest of the field over the next two laps, while Beechey began to suffer with a misfire. On lap 4 Moffat slowed with a spark plug problem which eventually led to his retirement, giving Geoghegan a break over Beechey and Jane who were battling hard for second place. Nick Petrilli also retired when a piston let go. Jane spun at Forrest's Elbow a few laps later, taking the pressure off of Beechey.

Geoghegan was running the race on worn tyres, as his supplier Firestone did not have new tyres available. As a result, Beechey was able to easily reduce Geoghegan's lead in the second half of the race. At the same time, Phil Barnes began slowing up in his Morris Cooper S, allowing Peter Manton, Bob Holden and Roy Griffiths past. Beechey took the lead going into Murray's Corner on lap 18 and pulled away to take victory. Geoghegan held on for second place while Jane finished third despite his spin. The Porsches of McKeown and Foley finished fourth and fifth respectively while Brauer was the final point-scorer in sixth.

=== Sandown ===
Allan Moffat took his second pole position of the season at Sandown, with Norm Beechey qualifying on the front row ahead of Ian Geoghegan, Bob Jane and Jim McKeown. Beechey took the lead at the start and led all the way to the finish, setting a new lap record in the process. Moffat held second place over Geoghegan until lap 25 when he began having engine dramas, allowing Geoghegan to pass. Jane battled with the Porsches of McKeown and Brian Foley early on before McKeown retired on lap 15, while Foley made contact with a fence and allowed Jane to take fourth place. Foley recovered to finish fifth ahead of Graham Ritter's Ford Escort.

=== Mallala ===
Brian Foley took pole position at the Mallala round, giving Porsche its first pole position in the championship. Jim McKeown and Allan Moffat started the race with wet tyres after rain fell during the morning of the race. Moffat built an early lead before the track started to dry out, which led to the retirement of McKeown due to overheating tyres. Norm Beechey moved into second place and was catching Moffat when his clutch started to slip, allowing Ian Geoghegan and Foley to pass. Moffat's clutch then failed, gifting the lead to Geoghegan. Foley experienced a change in handling which was found to be caused by a broken roll-bar bracket when he made a pit stop. This allowed Beechey to take second place behind Geoghegan while Foley would still manage to finish third. Bill Brown finished fourth ahead of Bob Jane and Peter Manton.

=== Warwick Farm ===
Allan Moffat again qualified on pole position for the fifth round of the championship at Warwick Farm. However, he spun at the first corner and was collected by Ian Geoghegan, while Brian Foley and Bill Brown were also caught up in the incident. Moffat, Geoghegan and Foley all retired from the race while Brown was able to continue. Jim McKeown, after making a good start, had missed the accident and Norm Beechey had moved up to second place. Beechey lost a rear wheel, giving second place to Bob Jane and allowing Brown on to the podium. McKeown took victory, Porsche's first in the championship, ahead of Jane, Brown, Phil Barnes, Chris Brauer and John Humphrey. The victory brought McKeown into championship contention, eight points behind Beechey and five behind Geoghegan with eighteen points still on offer.

=== Lakeside ===
The Lakeside event was marred by a pair of bad accidents. One of the support races saw one driver killed and another seriously injured. Chris Brauer then suffered career-ending injuries in the touring car championship race. Allan Moffat made a poor start from pole position which resulted in Bob Jane and Brian Foley squeezing together. Jane was then pushed into Brauer's car, which left the circuit and slammed into the end of an armco barrier. The race continued with yellow flags at the first corner. Moffat was black flagged for attempting to pass in the yellow flag zone. Ian Geoghegan led the race until lap 7 when he retired with engine problems. Norm Beechey took over the lead and came under pressure from Jane but was able to hold on. Beechey and Jane remained in first and second until the end of the race with Jim McKeown completing the podium. Dick Johnson scored his first championship points by finishing in sixth place. Beechey's victory was enough to secure the title with one race remaining.

=== Symmons Plains ===
Allan Moffat took his fifth pole position of the season, driving his new Ford XW Falcon GTHO Phase II, dubbed the "Super Falcon". Along with Norm Beechey, however, Moffat did not start the race after both drivers blew their engines in practice. The race was held in wet conditions and second-fastest qualifier Jim McKeown took the lead at the start, while Bob Jane lost traction off the start and lost a place to Bryan Thomson. The wet conditions suited McKeown's Porsche and he took a one-lap victory over Thomson with Jane a further lap back in third. The result saw McKeown pass Jane for second place in the championship.

== Championship standings ==
=== Points system ===
Points were awarded as follows to the top six finishers in each heat.

Position	**1st**	**2nd**	**3rd**	**4th**	**5th**	**6th**
Points	9	6	4	3	2	1

=== Championship points ===
Pos.	Driver	Car	CAL (Victoria (state))	BAT (New South Wales)	SAN (Victoria (state))	MAL (South Australia)	WAR (New South Wales)	LAK (Queensland)	SYM (Tasmania)	Pts.
1	Norm Beechey	Holden HT Monaro GTS350	8	1	1	2	Ret	1	DNS	33
2	Jim McKeown	Porsche 911S	3	4	Ret	Ret	1	3	1	29
3	Bob Jane	Ford Mustang	4	3	4	5	2	2	3	28
4	Ian Geoghegan	Ford Mustang	Ret	**2**	2	1	Ret	Ret		21
5	Brian Foley	Porsche 911S	2	5	5	**3**	Ret			14
6	Allan Moffat	Ford Boss 302 Mustang	**1**	Ret	**3**	Ret	**Ret**	**Ret**	**DNS**	13
7	Bill Brown	Porsche 911S				4	3	4		10
8	Bryan Thomson	Chevrolet Camaro SS			Ret				2	6
9	Phil Barnes	Morris Cooper S		10			4			3
9	Robin Pare	Ford Mustang							4	3
9	Chris Brauer	Ford Mustang		6			5	Ret		3
12	Bob Brown	Morris Cooper S	5							2
12	John French	Morris Cooper S						5		2
12	Tony Calvert	Ford Mustang							5	2
12	Peter Manton	Morris Cooper S	14	7	7	6	Ret	Ret	6	2
16	Bill Fanning	Ford Cortina Lotus	6							1
16	Graham Ritter	Ford Escort Twin Cam			6					1
16	John Humphrey	Austin Cooper S					6	Ret		1
16	Dick Johnson	Holden LC Torana GTR		15				6		1
Pos.	Driver	Car	CAL (Victoria (state))	BAT (New South Wales)	SAN (Victoria (state))	MAL (South Australia)	WAR (New South Wales)	LAK (Queensland)	SYM (Tasmania)	Pts.

Colour	Result
Gold	Winner
Silver	Second place
Bronze	Third place
Green	Points classification
Blue	Non-points classification
Blue	Non-classified finish (NC)
Purple	Retired, not classified (Ret)
Red	Did not qualify (DNQ)
Red	Did not pre-qualify (DNPQ)
Black	Disqualified (DSQ)
White	Did not start (DNS)
White	Withdrew (WD)
White	Race cancelled (C)
Blank	Did not practice (DNP)
Blank	Did not arrive (DNA)
Blank	Excluded (EX)

Bold - Pole position
