= 2002 V8 Supercars Sandown round =

2002 Supercar Championship event

(Victoria (state)) 2002 Betta Electrical V8 Ultimate
Event Information
- Round 13 of 13 in the 2002 V8 Supercar Championship Series
- Date: 29 November–1 December 2002
- Location: Melbourne, Victoria
- Venue: Sandown Raceway
- Weather: Fine

Results
Race 1
| Distance | 48 laps | 150 km |
| Pole position | Marcos Ambrose; Stone Brothers Racing | 1:11.0674 |
| Winner | Marcos Ambrose; Stone Brothers Racing | 58:30.4851 |
Race 2
| Distance | 96 laps | 300 km |
| Winner | Marcos Ambrose; Stone Brothers Racing | 2:28:23.0280 |
Round Results
| First | Marcos Ambrose; Stone Brothers Racing | 240 pts |
| Second | Greg Murphy; Tom Walkinshaw Racing Australia | 166 pts |
| Third | Mark Skaife; Holden Racing Team | 163 pts |

The 2002 V8 Supercars Sandown round (known for naming rights reasons as the 2002 Betta Electrical V8 Ultimate) was the thirteenth and final round of the 2002 V8 Supercar Championship Series. It was the 31st ATCC/V8 Supercar event to be held at Sandown in the sprint format and was held on the weekend of 29 November to 1 December at the Sandown Raceway in Melbourne, Victoria.

Marcos Ambrose dominated the round by taking pole position and winning both races en route to taking overall round honours. In qualifying, Ambrose exhibited noticeably stronger pace than the rest of the field. In the races, his lead was never in question and won comfortably in a lights-to-flag effort. Greg Murphy claimed second overall to help cement second in the championship standings while Mark Skaife claimed third for the round.

== Background ==
The event was held on the weekend of 29 November to 1 December 2002. It was the 31st ATCC/V8 Supercar event to be held at Sandown Raceway and consisted of one 150 km race followed by a 300 km final which would reward double points.

Mark Skaife entered the round as the champion, having already sewn up the championship at the tenth round of the championship at Bathurst. Second place was still up for grabs with the primary contenders being Jason Bright, Marcos Ambrose and Greg Murphy.

=== Entry list ===
There were 35 drivers entered into the event with no necessitation for pre-qualifying.

Paul Stokell replaced Anthony Tratt at Paul Little Racing for undisclosed reasons, Simon Wills became the sixth driver to compete for Imrie Motorsport, and Matthew White returned with his privateer outfit. Paul Morris returned to the series after missing the previous rounds on the Gold Coast and New Zealand while the team undertook extensive repair work following Morris' accident at the Bathurst 1000.

Garth Tander was entered under the number 427 for this round in reference to Garry Rogers Motorsport winning the Bathurst 24 Hour for Holden in the Monaro 427.

This was the last V8 Supercar event in which the VT Holden Commodore would be utilised.

== Race report ==
=== Qualifying ===
Ambrose claimed pole position with a time nearly two tenths faster than nearest competitor, Greg Murphy. Ambrose was the only driver to set a time below the 1 minute 11 second bracket.

| Pos | No | Name | Team | Vehicle | Time |
|---|---|---|---|---|---|
| 1 | 4 | (Australia) Marcos Ambrose | Stone Brothers Racing | Ford Falcon (AU) | 1:10.9872 |
| 2 | 1 | (Australia) Mark Skaife | Holden Racing Team | Holden Commodore (VX) | 1:11.1006 |
| 3 | 9 | (Australia) David Besnard | Stone Brothers Racing | Ford Falcon (AU) | 1:11.1941 |
| 4 | 8 | (Australia) Russell Ingall | Perkins Engineering | Holden Commodore (VX) | 1:11.2898 |
| 5 | 2 | (Australia) Jason Bright | Holden Racing Team | Holden Commodore (VX) | 1:11.2979 |
| 6 | 51 | (New Zealand) Greg Murphy | Tom Walkinshaw Racing Australia | Holden Commodore (VX) | 1:11.3264 |
| 7 | 00 | (Australia) Craig Lowndes | 00 Motorsport | Ford Falcon (AU) | 1:11.3372 |
| 8 | 31 | (Australia) Steven Ellery | Steven Ellery Racing | Ford Falcon (AU) | 1:11.3934 |
| 9 | 888 | (Australia) John Bowe | Brad Jones Racing | Ford Falcon (AU) | 1:11.4100 |
| 10 | 15 | (Australia) Todd Kelly | Tom Walkinshaw Racing Australia | Holden Commodore (VX) | 1:11.4813 |
| 11 | 3 | (Australia) Cameron McConville | Lansvale Racing Team | Holden Commodore (VX) | 1:11.5797 |
| 12 | 16 | (New Zealand) Steven Richards | Perkins Engineering | Holden Commodore (VX) | 1:11.5835 |
| 13 | 40 | (Australia) Cameron McLean | Paragon Motorsport | Ford Falcon (AU) | 1:11.6319 |
| 14 | 65 | (Brazil) Max Wilson | Briggs Motorsport | Ford Falcon (AU) | 1:11.6377 |
| 15 | 021 | (New Zealand) Jason Richards | Team Kiwi Racing | Holden Commodore (VT) | 1:11.6519 |
| 16 | 02 | (Australia) Rick Kelly | Holden Young Lions | Holden Commodore (VX) | 1:11.7259 |
| 17 | 35 | (Australia) Jason Bargwanna | Garry Rogers Motorsport | Holden Commodore (VX) | 1:11.7367 |
| 18 | 17 | (Australia) Steven Johnson | Dick Johnson Racing | Ford Falcon (AU) | 1:11.8553 |
| 19 | 427 | (Australia) Garth Tander | Garry Rogers Motorsport | Holden Commodore (VX) | 1:11.8650 |
| 20 | 7 | (Australia) Rodney Forbes | 00 Motorsport | Ford Falcon (AU) | 1:11.8821 |
| 21 | 11 | (Australia) Larry Perkins | Perkins Engineering | Holden Commodore (VX) | 1:11.9042 |
| 22 | 21 | (Australia) Brad Jones | Brad Jones Racing | Ford Falcon (AU) | 1:11.9165 |
| 23 | 10 | (Australia) Mark Larkham | Larkham Motorsport | Ford Falcon (AU) | 1:11.9384 |
| 24 | 18 | (New Zealand) Paul Radisich | Dick Johnson Racing | Ford Falcon (AU) | 1:11.9928 |
| 25 | 27 | (Australia) Neil Crompton | 00 Motorsport | Ford Falcon (AU) | 1:12.0160 |
| 26 | 5 | (Australia) Glenn Seton | Glenn Seton Racing | Ford Falcon (AU) | 1:12.0681 |
| 27 | 66 | (Australia) Tony Longhurst | Briggs Motorsport | Ford Falcon (AU) | 1:12.0763 |
| 28 | 46 | (New Zealand) John Faulkner | John Faulkner Racing | Holden Commodore (VX) | 1:12.0929 |
| 29 | 43 | (Australia) Paul Weel | Paul Weel Racing | Ford Falcon (AU) | 1:12.1094 |
| 30 | 29 | (Australia) Paul Morris | Paul Morris Motorsport | Holden Commodore (VX) | 1:12.1927 |
| 31 | 54 | (New Zealand) Craig Baird | Rod Nash Racing | Holden Commodore (VX) | 1:12.2773 |
| 32 | 600 | (Australia) Dean Canto | Briggs Motorsport | Ford Falcon (AU) | 1:12.5183 |
| 33 | 24 | (Australia) Matthew White | Matthew White Racing | Holden Commodore (VT) | 1:12.6007 |
| 34 | 75 | (Australia) Paul Stokell | Paul Little Racing | Ford Falcon (AU) | 1:13.1061 |
| 35 | 14 | (New Zealand) Simon Wills | Imrie Motorsport | Holden Commodore (VX) | 1:13.2836 |

=== Top fifteen shootout ===
| Pos | No | Name | Team | Vehicle | Time |
|---|---|---|---|---|---|
| 1 | 4 | (Australia) Marcos Ambrose | Stone Brothers Racing | Ford Falcon (AU) | 1:11.0674 |
| 2 | 00 | (Australia) Craig Lowndes | 00 Motorsport | Ford Falcon (AU) | 1:11.2144 |
| 3 | 9 | (Australia) David Besnard | Stone Brothers Racing | Ford Falcon (AU) | 1:11.7020 |
| 4 | 51 | (New Zealand) Greg Murphy | Tom Walkinshaw Racing Australia | Holden Commodore (VX) | 1:11.9537 |
| 5 | 16 | (New Zealand) Steven Richards | Perkins Engineering | Holden Commodore (VX) | 1:12.1726 |
| 6 | 31 | (Australia) Steven Ellery | Steven Ellery Racing | Ford Falcon (AU) | 1:12.1952 |
| 7 | 3 | (Australia) Cameron McConville | Lansvale Racing Team | Holden Commodore (VX) | 1:12.2909 |
| 8 | 15 | (Australia) Todd Kelly | Tom Walkinshaw Racing Australia | Holden Commodore (VX) | 1:12.2948 |
| 9 | 8 | (Australia) Russell Ingall | Perkins Engineering | Holden Commodore (VX) | 1:12.3225 |
| 10 | 65 | (Brazil) Max Wilson | Briggs Motorsport | Ford Falcon (AU) | 1:12.3240 |
| 11 | 021 | (New Zealand) Jason Richards | Team Kiwi Racing | Holden Commodore (VT) | 1:12.3651 |
| 12 | 888 | (Australia) John Bowe | Brad Jones Racing | Ford Falcon (AU) | 1:12.3897 |
| 13 | 2 | (Australia) Jason Bright | Holden Racing Team | Holden Commodore (VX) | 1:13.2296 |
| 14 | 40 | (Australia) Cameron McLean | Paragon Motorsport | Ford Falcon (AU) | 1:13.4826 |
| 15 | 1 | (Australia) Mark Skaife | Holden Racing Team | Holden Commodore (VX) | no time |

=== Race 1 ===
| Pos | No | Name | Team | Vehicle | Laps | Time/Retired | Grid |
|---|---|---|---|---|---|---|---|
| 1 | 4 | (Australia) Marcos Ambrose | Stone Brothers Racing | Ford Falcon (AU) | 48 | 58:30.4851 | 1 |
| 2 | 51 | (New Zealand) Greg Murphy | Tom Walkinshaw Racing Australia | Holden Commodore (VX) | 48 | + 6.391 | 4 |
| 3 | 9 | (Australia) David Besnard | Stone Brothers Racing | Ford Falcon (AU) | 48 | + 7.624 | 3 |
| 4 | 15 | (Australia) Todd Kelly | Tom Walkinshaw Racing Australia | Holden Commodore (VX) | 48 | + 15.727 | 8 |
| 5 | 1 | (Australia) Mark Skaife | Holden Racing Team | Holden Commodore (VX) | 48 | + 24.474 | 15 |
| 6 | 16 | (New Zealand) Steven Richards | Perkins Engineering | Holden Commodore (VX) | 48 | + 30.975 | 5 |
| 7 | 00 | (Australia) Craig Lowndes | 00 Motorsport | Ford Falcon (AU) | 48 | + 40.887 | 2 |
| 8 | 427 | (Australia) Garth Tander | Garry Rogers Motorsport | Holden Commodore (VX) | 48 | + 42.675 | 19 |
| 9 | 888 | (Australia) John Bowe | Brad Jones Racing | Ford Falcon (AU) | 48 | + 43.183 | 12 |
| 10 | 31 | (Australia) Steven Ellery | Steven Ellery Racing | Ford Falcon (AU) | 48 | + 48.562 | 6 |
| 11 | 17 | (Australia) Steven Johnson | Dick Johnson Racing | Ford Falcon (AU) | 48 | + 49.212 | 18 |
| 12 | 27 | (Australia) Neil Crompton | 00 Motorsport | Ford Falcon (AU) | 48 | + 49.882 | 25 |
| 13 | 43 | (Australia) Paul Weel | Paul Weel Racing | Ford Falcon (AU) | 48 | + 56.076 | 29 |
| 14 | 65 | (Brazil) Max Wilson | Briggs Motorsport | Ford Falcon (AU) | 48 | + 56.930 | 10 |
| 15 | 66 | (Australia) Tony Longhurst | Briggs Motorsport | Ford Falcon (AU) | 48 | + 1:00.381 | 27 |
| 16 | 021 | (New Zealand) Jason Richards | Team Kiwi Racing | Holden Commodore (VT) | 48 | + 1:01.227 | 11 |
| 17 | 600 | (Australia) Dean Canto | Briggs Motorsport | Ford Falcon (AU) | 48 | + 1:01.763 | 32 |
| 18 | 21 | (Australia) Brad Jones | Brad Jones Racing | Ford Falcon (AU) | 48 | + 1:02.239 | 22 |
| 19 | 46 | (New Zealand) John Faulkner | John Faulkner Racing | Holden Commodore (VX) | 48 | + 1:02.681 | 28 |
| 20 | 35 | (Australia) Jason Bargwanna | Garry Rogers Motorsport | Holden Commodore (VX) | 48 | + 1:25.635 | 17 |
| 21 | 54 | (New Zealand) Craig Baird | Rod Nash Racing | Holden Commodore (VX) | 47 | + 1 lap | 31 |
| 22 | 5 | (Australia) Glenn Seton | Glenn Seton Racing | Ford Falcon (AU) | 47 | + 1 lap | 26 |
| 23 | 10 | (Australia) Mark Larkham | Larkham Motorsport | Ford Falcon (AU) | 47 | + 1 lap | 23 |
| 24 | 75 | (Australia) Paul Stokell | Paul Little Racing | Ford Falcon (AU) | 47 | + 1 lap | 34 |
| 25 | 8 | (Australia) Russell Ingall | Perkins Engineering | Holden Commodore (VX) | 47 | + 1 lap | 9 |
| 26 | 7 | (Australia) Rodney Forbes | 00 Motorsport | Ford Falcon (AU) | 47 | + 1 lap | 20 |
| 27 | 29 | (Australia) Paul Morris | Paul Morris Motorsport | Holden Commodore (VX) | 47 | + 1 lap | 30 |
| 28 | 14 | (New Zealand) Simon Wills | Imrie Motorsport | Holden Commodore (VX) | 47 | + 1 lap | 35 |
| 29 | 18 | (New Zealand) Paul Radisich | Dick Johnson Racing | Ford Falcon (AU) | 47 | + 1 lap | 24 |
| 30 | 11 | (Australia) Larry Perkins | Perkins Engineering | Holden Commodore (VX) | 46 | + 2 laps | 21 |
| 31 | 3 | (Australia) Cameron McConville | Lansvale Racing Team | Holden Commodore (VX) | 46 | + 2 laps | 7 |
| Ret | 02 | (Australia) Rick Kelly | Holden Young Lions | Holden Commodore (VX) | 25 | Retired | 16 |
| Ret | 24 | (Australia) Matthew White | Matthew White Racing | Holden Commodore (VT) | 17 | Retired | 33 |
| Ret | 2 | (Australia) Jason Bright | Holden Racing Team | Holden Commodore (VX) | 15 | Retired | 13 |
| Ret | 40 | (Australia) Cameron McLean | Paragon Motorsport | Ford Falcon (AU) | 12 | Retired | |
Fastest Lap: Marcos Ambrose (Stone Brothers Racing) - 1:11.6658 on lap 10

=== Race 2 ===
| Pos | No | Name | Team | Vehicle | Laps | Time/Retired | Grid |
|---|---|---|---|---|---|---|---|
| 1 | 4 | (Australia) Marcos Ambrose | Stone Brothers Racing | Ford Falcon (AU) | 96 | 02:28:23.0280 | 1 |
| 2 | 1 | (Australia) Mark Skaife | Holden Racing Team | Holden Commodore (VX) | 96 | + 7.534 | 5 |
| 3 | 51 | (New Zealand) Greg Murphy | Tom Walkinshaw Racing Australia | Holden Commodore (VX) | 96 | + 11.371 | 2 |
| 4 | 2 | (Australia) Jason Bright | Holden Racing Team | Holden Commodore (VX) | 96 | + 17.131 | 33 |
| 5 | 02 | (Australia) Rick Kelly | Holden Young Lions | Holden Commodore (VX) | 96 | + 17.285 | 32 |
| 6 | 888 | (Australia) John Bowe | Brad Jones Racing | Ford Falcon (AU) | 96 | + 17.826 | 9 |
| 7 | 9 | (Australia) David Besnard | Stone Brothers Racing | Ford Falcon (AU) | 96 | + 26.196 | 3 |
| 8 | 66 | (Australia) Tony Longhurst | Briggs Motorsport | Ford Falcon (AU) | 96 | + 31.728 | 15 |
| 9 | 43 | (Australia) Paul Weel | Paul Weel Racing | Ford Falcon (AU) | 96 | + 35.304 | 13 |
| 10 | 31 | (Australia) Steven Ellery | Steven Ellery Racing | Ford Falcon (AU) | 96 | + 36.497 | 10 |
| 11 | 35 | (Australia) Jason Bargwanna | Garry Rogers Motorsport | Holden Commodore (VX) | 96 | + 37.271 | 20 |
| 12 | 5 | (Australia) Glenn Seton | Glenn Seton Racing | Ford Falcon (AU) | 96 | 41.257 | 22 |
| 13 | 17 | (Australia) Steven Johnson | Dick Johnson Racing | Ford Falcon (AU) | 96 | + 41.809 | 11 |
| 14 | 11 | (Australia) Larry Perkins | Perkins Engineering | Holden Commodore (VX) | 96 | + 53.411 | 30 |
| 15 | 7 | (Australia) Rodney Forbes | 00 Motorsport | Ford Falcon (AU) | 96 | + 1:09.432 | 26 |
| 16 | 21 | (Australia) Brad Jones | Brad Jones Racing | Ford Falcon (AU) | 95 | + 1 lap | 18 |
| 17 | 00 | (Australia) Craig Lowndes | 00 Motorsport | Ford Falcon (AU) | 95 | + 1 lap | 7 |
| 18 | 021 | (New Zealand) Jason Richards | Team Kiwi Racing | Holden Commodore (VT) | 95 | + 1 lap | 16 |
| 19 | 8 | (Australia) Russell Ingall | Perkins Engineering | Holden Commodore (VX) | 95 | + 1 lap | 25 |
| 20 | 10 | (Australia) Mark Larkham | Larkham Motorsport | Ford Falcon (AU) | 95 | + 1 lap | 23 |
| 21 | 40 | (Australia) Cameron McLean | Paragon Motorsport | Ford Falcon (AU) | 91 | + 5 laps | 34 |
| 22 | 600 | (Australia) Dean Canto | Briggs Motorsport | Ford Falcon (AU) | 87 | + 9 laps | 17 |
| 23 | 65 | (Brazil) Max Wilson | Briggs Motorsport | Ford Falcon (AU) | 82 | + 14 laps | 14 |
| Ret | 14 | (New Zealand) Simon Wills | Imrie Motorsport | Holden Commodore (VX) | 67 | Retired | 28 |
| Ret | 18 | (New Zealand) Paul Radisich | Dick Johnson Racing | Ford Falcon (AU) | 62 | Retired | 29 |
| Ret | 15 | (Australia) Todd Kelly | Tom Walkinshaw Racing Australia | Holden Commodore (VX) | 62 | Retired | 4 |
| Ret | 427 | (Australia) Garth Tander | Garry Rogers Motorsport | Holden Commodore (VX) | 62 | Retired | 8 |
| Ret | 16 | (New Zealand) Steven Richards | Perkins Engineering | Holden Commodore (VX) | 51 | Retired | 6 |
| Ret | 27 | (Australia) Neil Crompton | 00 Motorsport | Ford Falcon (AU) | 50 | Retired | 12 |
| Ret | 46 | (New Zealand) John Faulkner | John Faulkner Racing | Holden Commodore (VX) | 46 | Retired | 19 |
| Ret | 75 | (Australia) Paul Stokell | Paul Little Racing | Ford Falcon (AU) | 29 | Retired | 24 |
| Ret | 3 | (Australia) Cameron McConville | Lansvale Racing Team | Holden Commodore (VX) | 24 | Retired | 31 |
| Ret | 29 | (Australia) Paul Morris | Paul Morris Motorsport | Holden Commodore (VX) | 22 | Retired | 27 |
| Ret | 54 | (New Zealand) Craig Baird | Rod Nash Racing | Holden Commodore (VX) | 18 | Retired | 21 |
| DNS | 24 | (Australia) Matthew White | Matthew White Racing | Holden Commodore (VT) | | Did not start | |
Fastest Lap: David Besnard (Stone Brothers Racing) - 1:12.060 on lap 62

== Championship points ==
Round points tally

| Pos. | No | Driver | Team | Pts |
|---|---|---|---|---|
| 1 | 4 | (Australia) Marcos Ambrose | Stone Brothers Racing | 240 |
| 2 | 51 | (New Zealand) Greg Murphy | Tom Walkinshaw Racing Australia | 166 |
| 3 | 1 | (Australia) Mark Skaife | Holden Racing Team | 163 |
| 4 | 9 | (Australia) David Besnard | Stone Brothers Racing | 109 |
| 5 | 888 | (Australia) John Bowe | Brad Jones Racing | 88 |

Drivers' Championship standings

| Pos. | No | Driver | Team | Pts |
|---|---|---|---|---|
| 1 | 1 | (Australia) Mark Skaife | Holden Racing Team | 2227 |
| 2 | 51 | (New Zealand) Greg Murphy | Tom Walkinshaw Racing Australia | 1569 |
| 3 | 4 | (Australia) Marcos Ambrose | Stone Brothers Racing | 1498 |
| 4 | 2 | (Australia) Jason Bright | Holden Racing Team | 1459 |
| 5 | 15 | (Australia) Todd Kelly | Tom Walkinshaw Racing Australia | 1345 |
