= 1965 Australian Touring Car Championship =

Motor racing competition

Seasons
- ← 1964 1966 →

The 1965 Australian Touring Car Championship was a CAMS sanctioned motor racing title open to Group C Improved Production Touring Cars. It was contested over a single 40-lap race staged at Sandown Raceway in Melbourne, Victoria, Australia on 11 April 1965. It was the sixth Australian Touring Car Championship title to be awarded and the first to be contested by cars complying with Group C regulations.

The championship was won by Norm Beechey, driving a Ford Mustang. It was the first ATCC to be won with a V8-engined car and the first of five ATCC titles won by drivers of Ford Mustangs. It was Beechey's first of two Australian Touring Car Championship wins.

== Race summary ==
The change in regulations from Appendix J to Group C had disadvantaged most heavily those driving Holdens, like Brian Muir, and Bob Jane's Jaguar, as the practice of overboring engines was effectively outlawed, making 4.1 litre Jaguars and 3.4-litre Holdens ineligible.

Jane qualified his new Ford Mustang on pole position, recording a time of 1:20.9. Beechey, also in a Mustang, had lapped in 1:20.8 in Friday practice, but could only manage a 1:34.3 in official practice. John Raeburn, driving a Ford Galaxie, and Jim McKeown, driving a Ford Cortina Lotus, completed the front row. The reigning champion Ian Geoghegan lined up in eighth place on the grid.

Jane made the best of the start while Muir passed Raeburn for second place going into the second corner, but Raeburn was able to retake the position going up the back straight. Jane led by six seconds at the end of lap 1, while Beechey had made his way up to fifth place. He took second place halfway through lap 2 and began closing the gap to Jane, setting a new lap record of 1:20.8 in the process. He caught Jane on lap 7 and passed him at the first corner on lap 8. Brian Foley pitted on lap 11 with a broken brake line while Stan Starcevich retired on lap 14 with a broken differential. Jane retired on lap 23 when his engine overheated, which left Beechey leading by more than a lap over McKeown and Geoghegan. The two Cortina drivers swapped positions twice before the crankshaft on McKeown's car broke with six laps remaining, elevating Muir into third place. Muir then lost the position to Allan Moffat, as he thought that Moffat was a lap down, but was able to retake the place before the end of the race.

Beechey took a comfortable victory, winning by a margin of one lap over Geoghegan and Muir. Moffat finished fourth ahead of Raeburn and Manton.

== Results ==
=== Starting grid ===
The starting grid was decided by times set in official practice. Class leaders are indicated by bold text.

Pos.	Class	No.	Driver	Entrant	Car	Time	Gap
1	Over 3000cc	5	(Australia) Bob Jane	Bob Jane South Yarra Car Sales	Ford Mustang	1:20.9	
2	Over 3000cc	21	(Australia) John Raeburn	Sir Gawaine Baillie	Ford Galaxie	1:24.9	+4.0
3	1501–2000cc	3	(Australia) Jim McKeown	Neptune Racing Team	Ford Cortina Mark I Lotus	1:25.2	+4.3
4	2001–3000cc	10	(Australia) Brian Muir	Heldon Motors P/L	Holden EH Special S4	1:26.3	+5.4
5	1101–1500cc	2	(Australia) Peter Manton	Neptune Racing Team	Morris Cooper S	1:26.7	+5.8
6	1501–2000cc	18	(Canada) Allan Moffat	A. Moffat	Ford Cortina Mark I Lotus	1:27.0	+6.1
7	1101–1500cc	8	(Australia) Brian Foley	Brian Foley Motors	Morris Cooper S	1:27.3	+6.4
8	1501–2000cc	1	(Australia) Ian Geoghegan	Total Team	Ford Cortina Mark I Lotus	1:27.4	+6.5
9	Over 3000cc	9	(Australia) Clem Smith	Clem Smith Motors	Chrysler Valiant R Series	1:28.6	+7.7
10	1101–1500cc	6	(Australia) John Harvey	Sports Car World	Austin Cooper S	1:30.0	+9.1
11			(Australia) Jim Russell		Morris Cooper S	1:31.6	+10.7
12	2001–3000cc	11	(Australia) Stan Starcevich	S. J. Starcevich	Holden EH Special S4	1:32.8	+11.9
13	Over 3000cc	4	(Australia) Norm Beechey	Neptune Racing Team	Ford Mustang	1:34.3	+13.4
14	1501–2000cc	20	(Australia) Robin Pare	Don Elliott	Ford Cortina Mark I Lotus	1:36.1	+15.2
15	2001–3000cc	15	(Australia) Ken Hastings	Road Racing Repairs	Holden 48-215 (Note: The official history: Australian Touring Car Championship - 50 Years lists all four Holdens as being EH S4s, but also includes images of two Holden 48-215 models competing in the race. An image on page 59 confirms that Muir drove an EH and the race report in Sports Car World says that Starcevich drove a "179 Holden", so it could not have been a 48-215. The two 48-215s must therefore have been driven by Hastings and McLean. Additionally, David McKay's race report in Modern Motor describes Hasting's car as an "elderly 2.2-litre Holden", supporting the assertion that it was not an EH S4.)	1:36.7	+15.8
16	2001–3000cc	14	(Australia) Ron McLean	Roberts Auto Spares	Holden 48-215	1:41.2	+20.3
17	Over 3000cc	17	(Australia) Dick Roberts	Wentworth Motors Pty. Ltd.	Chrysler Valiant R Series	1:41.4	+20.5
18	Under 1100cc	22	(Australia) Ewen Frazer	Ewen Frazer	Morris Cooper S	1:41.6	+20.7

=== Race ===
Class winners are indicated by bold text.

Pos.	Class	No.	Driver	Entrant	Car	Laps	Time/Retired	Grid
1	Over 3000cc	4	(Australia) Norm Beechey	Neptune Racing Team	Ford Mustang	40	56:37.7	13
2	1501–2000cc	1	(Australia) Ian Geoghegan	Total Team	Ford Cortina Mark I Lotus	39	+1 lap	8
3	2001–3000cc	10	(Australia) Brian Muir	Heldon Motors P/L	Holden EH Special S4	39	+1 lap	4
4	1501–2000cc	18	(Canada) Allan Moffat	A. Moffat	Ford Cortina Mark I Lotus	39	+1 lap	6
5	Over 3000cc	21	(Australia) John Raeburn	Sir Gawaine Baillie	Ford Galaxie	39	+1 lap	2
6	1101–1500cc	2	(Australia) Peter Manton	Neptune Racing Team	Morris Cooper S	39	+1 lap	5
7	1101–1500cc	6	(Australia) John Harvey	Sports Car World	Austin Cooper S	38	+2 laps	10
8			(Australia) Jim Russell		Morris Cooper S	37	+3 laps	11
9	Over 3000cc	9	(Australia) Clem Smith	Clem Smith Motors	Chrysler Valiant R Series	37	+3 laps	9
10	1501–2000cc	20	(Australia) Robin Pare	Don Elliott	Ford Cortina Mark I Lotus	35	+5 laps	14
11	2001–3000cc	15	(Australia) Ken Hastings	Road Racing Repairs	Holden 48-215	33	+7 laps	15
12	2001–3000cc	14	(Australia) Ron McLean	Roberts Auto Spares	Holden 48-215	33	+7 laps	16
13	Under 1100cc	22	(Australia) Ewen Frazer	Ewen Frazer	Morris Cooper S	32	+8 laps	18
14	Over 3000cc	17	(Australia) Dick Roberts	Wentworth Motors Pty. Ltd.	Chrysler Valiant R Series	32	+8 laps	17
15	1101–1500cc	8	(Australia) Brian Foley	Brian Foley Motors	Morris Cooper S	32	+8 laps	7
Ret	1501–2000cc	3	(Australia) Jim McKeown	Neptune Racing Team	Ford Cortina Mark I Lotus	34	Crankshaft	3
Ret	Over 3000cc	5	(Australia) Bob Jane	Bob Jane South Yarra Car Sales	Ford Mustang	23	Overheating	1
Ret	2001–3000cc	11	(Australia) Stan Starcevich	S. J. Starcevich	Holden EH Special S4	14	Differential	12

== Statistics ==
- Fastest race lap: Norm Beechey, 1:20.8
- Race distance: 40 laps, 124.12 km
- Average speed: 131.43 km/h
