= Australian Touring Car Championship =

Predecessor to the V8 Supercar Championship Series

- Category: Touring car racing
- Country: Australia; New Zealand
- Inaugural season: 1960; 66 years ago
- Drivers: 24
- Teams: 11
- Constructors: (United States) Chevrolet • (United States) Ford • (Japan) Toyota
- Tyre suppliers: Dunlop
- Drivers' champion: (Australia) Chaz Mostert
- Makes' champion: (United States) Chevrolet
- Teams' champion: Triple Eight Race Engineering
- Official website: www.supercars.com

The Australian Touring Car Championship (ATCC) is a touring car racing award held in Australia since 1960. The series itself is no longer contested, but the title lives on, with the winner of the Repco Supercars Championship awarded the trophy and title of Australian Touring Car Champion.

== History ==
The first Australian Touring Car Championship was held in 1960 as a single race for Appendix J Touring Cars. This was reflected the rising popularity of races held for passenger sedans; as opposed to those for purpose built open wheel racing cars, or sports cars. The race was held at the Gnoo Blas Motor Racing Circuit in Orange in rural New South Wales, west of Sydney. It was won by journalist racer, David McKay driving a Jaguar 3.4 Litre prepared by his own racing team, which to this point had been better known for preparing open-wheel and sports racing cars.

The early years of the ATCC saw the annual event held mostly at rural circuits, before finally visiting a major city circuit, Lakeside Raceway on the outskirts of Brisbane in 1964. This race was also the first not won by a Jaguar with Ian Geoghegan driving a Ford Cortina GT to win the first of his five titles. From 1965 the title would largely be won by an American V8 powered muscle car, most notably the Ford Mustang which would be used to win five consecutive titles in 1965 to 1969 with (Norm Beechey) and Geoghegan. The first championship victory by the driver of an Australian car was that of Beechey in 1970 driving a Holden HT Monaro GTS350. As of 4 December 2011 Beechey and Jamie Whincup are the only two people to have won the championship in both a Ford and a Holden. The 1971 and 1972 championships were won by 1962 and 1963 champion Bob Jane who drove a 7.0 litre Chevrolet Camaro ZL-1 in 1971 before CAMS rule changes forced Jane to use the smaller 5.7 litres 350 Chevrolet in the Camaro in 1972.

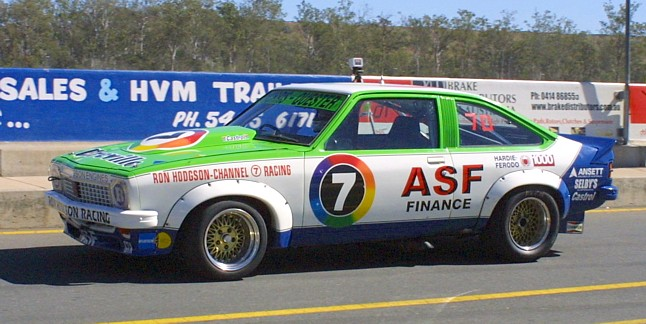
1979 Champion Bob Morris (Holden Torana)

A major shift occurred in 1973. The championship had grown from a single race into a multi-event series in 1969, but the competition had not changed markedly. The 'Supercar scare' that had rocked the buildup to 1972 Bathurst 500 forced sweeping changes through touring car regulations. The Improved Touring Car regulations which governed the ATCC, known at the time as Group C were amalgamated with the more basic Group E Series Production Touring Cars regulations which governed the Bathurst touring car endurance race in a compromise between the two, creating a single class for touring car racing that would hold sway of Australian Touring Car racing until the introduction of Group A in 1985.

This period saw a rise in the tribal style conflicts between Holden and Ford and in particular the two marques leading drivers, respectively Peter Brock and Allan Moffat who between them would claim seven of the eras 12 championships (and nine of the associated Bathurst victories). By the mid-1980s Group C had become wracked with infighting and almost random parity adjustments between competing marques.

Attention focussed purely on Holden and Ford had blurred as European and Japanese manufacturers joined the Australian agents of the two big American companies, the trend starting in 1981 with BMW, Mazda and Nissan. The international Group A regulations that already utilised by European and Japanese touring car series came into full effect in Australia from 1985 and allowed the international manufacturers to compete on equal terms. Holden was forced briefly into catchup phase and all but backed out of the sport in 1992 after Group A had been dominated by more track-focused production cars such as the turbocharged Ford Sierra RS500 and various Nissan Skylines, as well as the BMW M3.

By the mid-1980s, a number of the leading teams including the Holden Dealer Team, Dick Johnson Racing, JPS Team BMW and the Peter Jackson Nissan team had begun to make a lot of noise about the very little amount of prize money on offer for their efforts in crisscrossing the country in pursuit of the title. In 1984, the final year of the Group C rules, it was estimated that the Brisbane based Johnson team had covered some 20,000 km in travelling to and from championship meetings, often for as little as AU$1,500 for a win. When CAMS increased the title to 10 rounds in 1986, with little change to the prize money, the teams were threatening that the ATCC would see smaller and smaller grids unless CAMS found a series sponsor. The sponsor that was found was oil giant Shell who put up some $275,000 worth of prize money from the 1987 ATCC, ensuring the long-term future of the series.

1992 saw the unhappy demise of Group A and with the international touring car scene fragmenting in several directions (moving towards DTM, Super Touring and Super GT) Australia forged its own path evolving the Group A specification Holden Commodores and re-introducing the Ford Falcon into the new Group 3A regulations that would later be renamed as V8 Supercar.

The ATCC continued to be used until the end of the 1998 season, after which V8 Supercar organisers altered the name of the series, eventually adopting its present identity, the Supercars Championship.

== ATCC champions and records ==
Accurate to the 2025 Sandown 500. Current full-time drivers are highlighted in bold text. Part-time drivers are highlighted in italics.

=== Event starts by driver (Top-10) ===
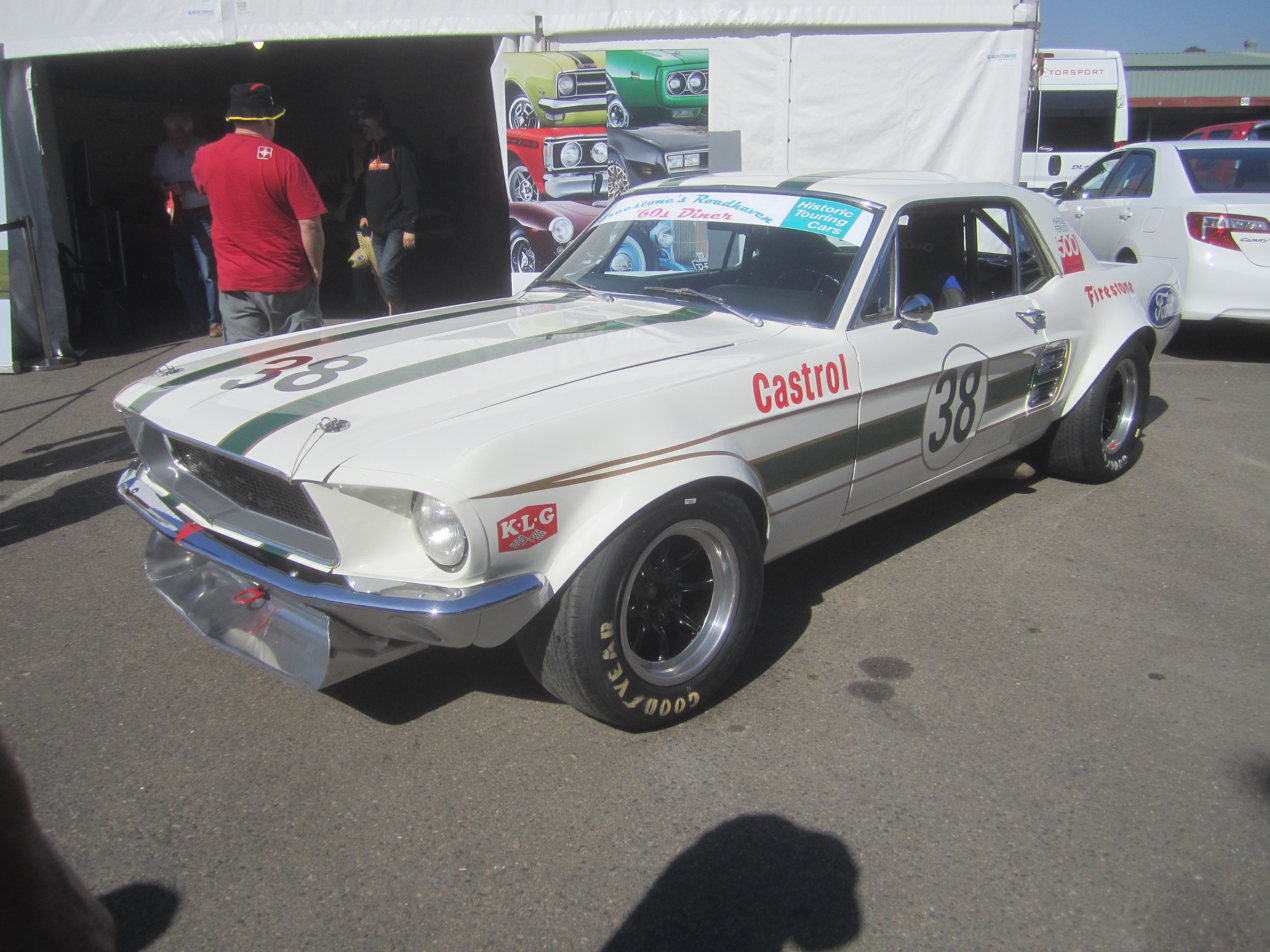
The Ford Mustang with which Ian Geoghegan won the 1967, 1968 and 1969 Australian Touring Car Championships, pictured in 2013.

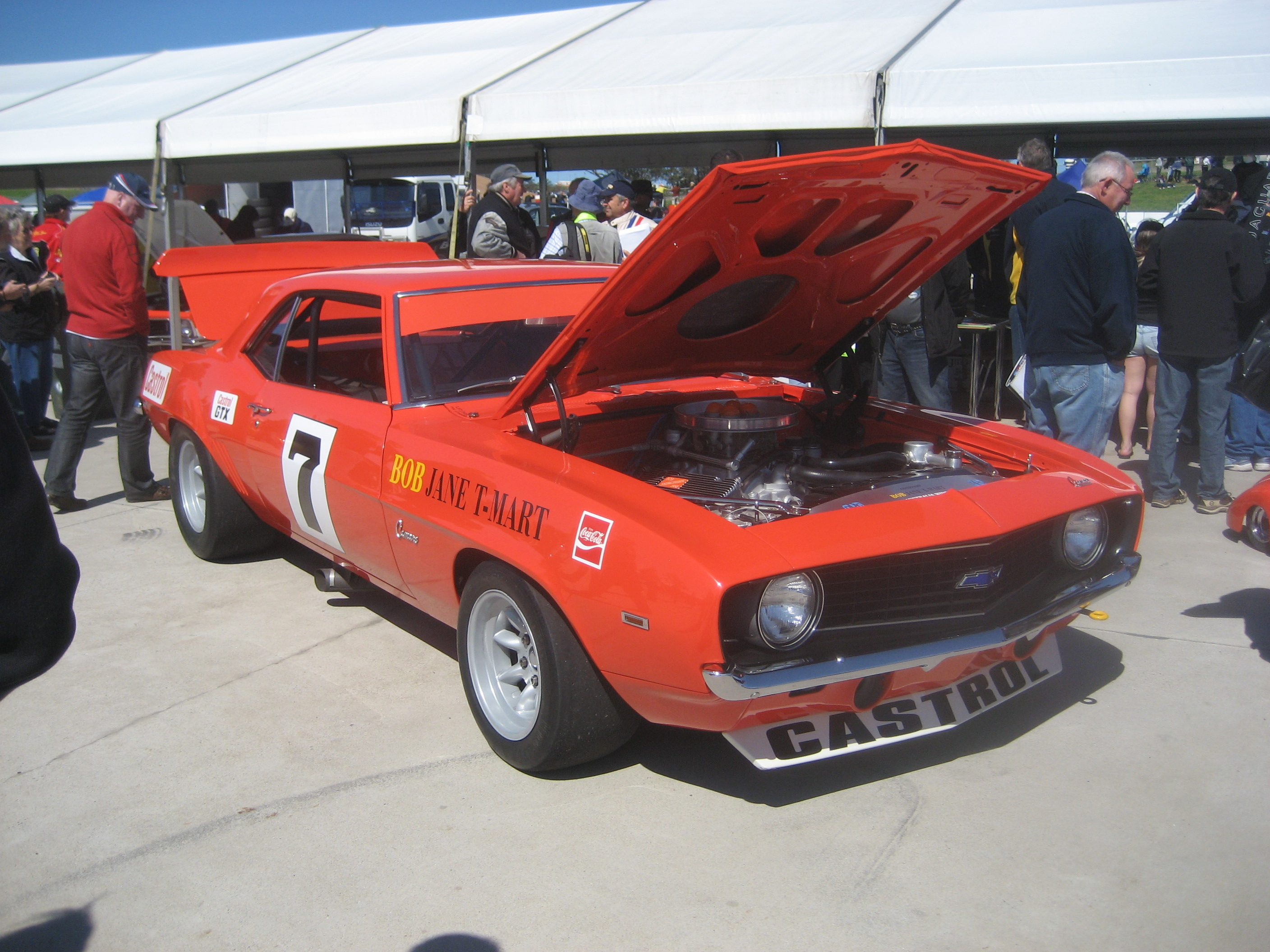
The Chevrolet Camaro ZL-1 in which Bob Jane won the 1971 Australian Touring Car Championship.

	Driver	Seasons	Starts
1	(Australia) Craig Lowndes	1996, 1998–2025	306
2	(Australia) Garth Tander	1998–2025	294
3	(Australia) Mark Winterbottom	2003–2025	289
4	(Australia) **Will Davison**	2004–2025	269
4	(Australia) **James Courtney**	2005–2025	269
5	(Australia) Rick Kelly	2001–2020	265
6	(Australia) Jason Bright	1997–2018	260
7	(Australia) Jamie Whincup	2002–2025	259
8	(Australia) Russell Ingall	1996–2016, 2021	254
9	(Australia) Todd Kelly	1999–2017	243
10	(Australia) Lee Holdsworth	2004–2025	233

=== Race wins by driver (Top-10) ===
	Driver	Seasons	Wins
1	(Australia) Jamie Whincup	2002–2025	125
2	(Australia) Craig Lowndes	1996, 1998–2025	110
3	(Australia) Mark Skaife	1987–2011	90
4	(New Zealand) Shane van Gisbergen	2007–2023	80
5	(Australia) Garth Tander	1998–2025	58
6	(New Zealand) Scott McLaughlin	2012–2020	56
7	(Australia) Peter Brock	1972–1997, 2002, 2004	48
8	(Australia) Glenn Seton	1984, 1986–2008, 2010	40
8	(Australia) Mark Winterbottom	2003–2025	40
10	(Canada) Allan Moffat	1965, 1970–1979, 1982–1984, 1988–1989	36

=== Pole positions by driver (Top-10) ===
	Driver	Poles
1	(Australia) Jamie Whincup	92
2	(New Zealand) Scott McLaughlin	76
3	(Australia) Peter Brock	57
4	(Australia) Craig Lowndes	43
5	(Australia) Mark Skaife	41
5	(New Zealand) Shane van Gisbergen	41
7	(Canada) Allan Moffat	39
8	(Australia) Mark Winterbottom	36
9	(Australia) Garth Tander	30
10	(Australia) Dick Johnson	28

=== Championship wins by driver ===
	Driver	Championships	Years
1	(Australia) Jamie Whincup	7	2008, 2009, 2011, 2012, 2013, 2014, 2017
2	(Australia) Ian Geoghegan	5	1964, 1966, 1967, 1968, 1969
2	(Australia) Dick Johnson	5	1981, 1982, 1984, 1988, 1989
2	(Australia) Mark Skaife	5	1992, 1994, 2000, 2001, 2002
5	(Australia) Bob Jane	4	1962, 1963, 1971, 1972
5	(Canada) Allan Moffat	4	1973, 1976, 1977, 1983
5	(New Zealand) Jim Richards	4	1985, 1987, 1990, 1991
8	(Australia) Peter Brock	3	1974, 1978, 1980
8	(Australia) Craig Lowndes	3	1996, 1998, 1999
8	(New Zealand) Scott McLaughlin	3	2018, 2019, 2020
8	(New Zealand) Shane van Gisbergen	3	2016, 2021, 2022
12	(Australia) Norm Beechey	2	1965, 1970
12	(Australia) Glenn Seton	2	1993, 1997
12	(Australia) Marcos Ambrose	2	2003, 2004
15	(Australia) David McKay	1	1960
15	(Australia) Bill Pitt	1	1961
15	(Australia) Colin Bond	1	1975
15	(Australia) Bob Morris	1	1979
15	(New Zealand) Robbie Francevic	1	1986
15	(Australia) John Bowe	1	1995
15	(Australia) Russell Ingall	1	2005
15	(Australia) Rick Kelly	1	2006
15	(Australia) Garth Tander	1	2007
15	(Australia) **James Courtney**	1	2010
15	(Australia) Mark Winterbottom	1	2015
15	(Australia) **Brodie Kostecki**	1	2023
15	(Australia) **Will Brown**	1	2024
15	(Australia) **Chaz Mostert**	1	2025

=== Championship wins by manufacturer ===
	Manufacturer	Championships	Years
1	**Ford**	25	1964, 1965, 1966, 1967, 1968, 1969, 1973, 1976, 1977, 1981, 1982, 1984, 1988, 1989, 1993, 1995, 1997, 2003, 2005, 2006, 2008, 2009, 2017, 2019, 2020
1	Holden	25	1970, 1974, 1975, 1978, 1979, 1980, 1994, 1996, 1998, 1999, 2000, 2001, 2002, 2004, 2007, 2010, 2011, 2012, 2013, 2014, 2015, 2016, 2018, 2021, 2022
3	**Chevrolet**	5	1971, 1972, 2023, 2024, 2025
4	Jaguar	4	1960, 1961, 1962, 1963
5	Nissan	3	1990, 1991, 1992
6	BMW	2	1985, 1987
7	Mazda	1	1983
7	Volvo	1	1986

== See also ==
- V8 Supercars
- List of Australian Touring Car and V8 Supercar champions
- List of Australian Touring Car Championship races
