= Holden EH =

Automobile produced by Holden in Australia from 1963 to 1965

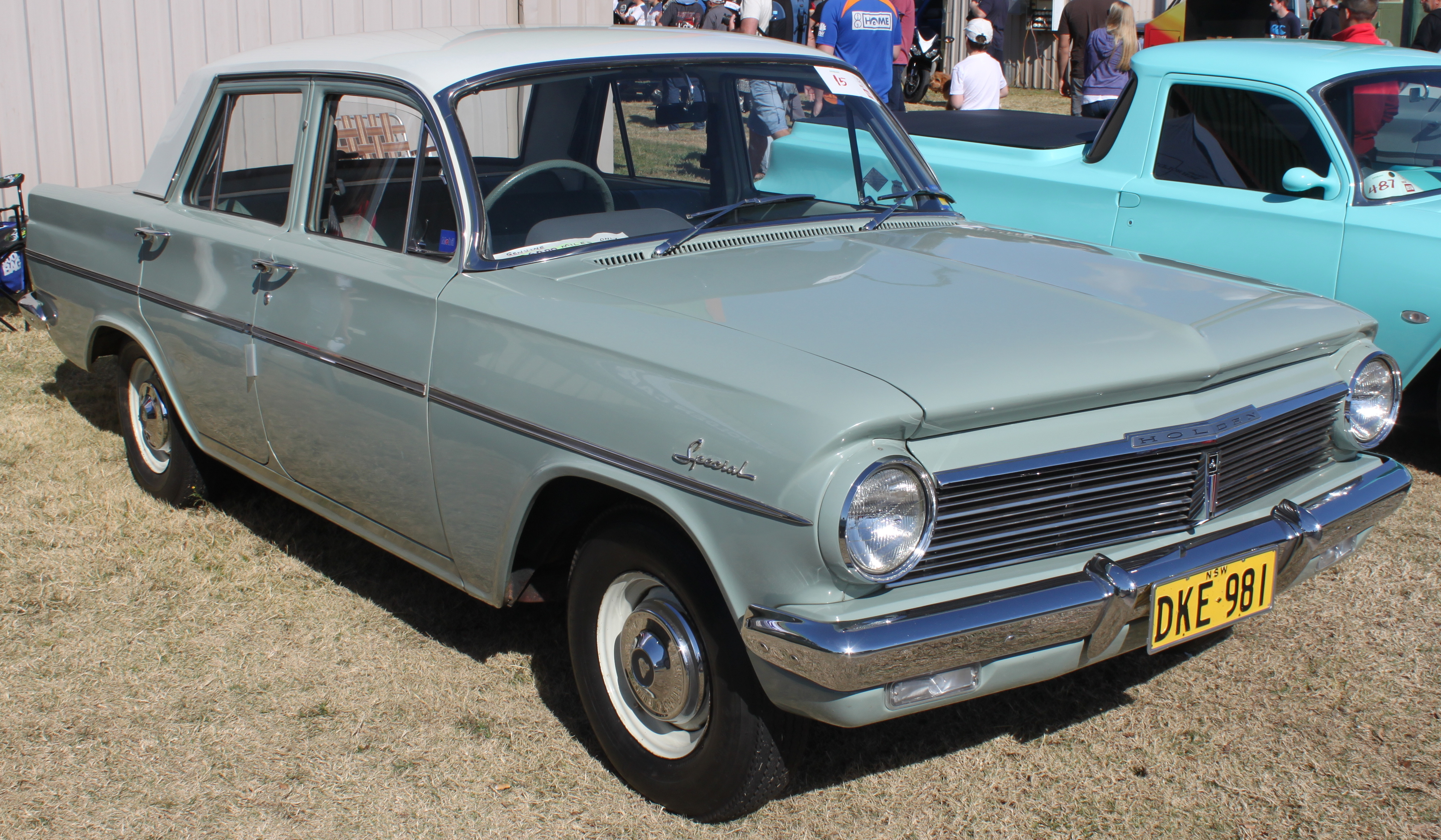
- Holden Special sedan

Overview
- Manufacturer: Holden
- Also called: Holden Standard; Holden Special; Holden Premier; Holden Utility; Holden Panel Van
- Production: August 1963–February 1965
- Designer: Stan Parker

Body and chassis
- Class: Mid-size
- Body style: 4-door sedan 5-door station wagon 2-door coupé utility 2-door panel van
- Layout: FR layout

Powertrain
- Engine: 2.4L GMH 149 I6; 2.9L GMH 179 I6
- Transmission: 3spd manual 3spd Hydra-Matic automatic

Dimensions
- Wheelbase: 106.0 inches (2692mm)
- Length: 177.6 inches (4511mm)
- Width: 68.0 inches (1727mm)
- Height: 58.2 inches (1478mm)
- Kerb weight: 2464lb (1118kg)

Chronology
- Predecessor: Holden EJ
- Successor: Holden HD

The Holden EH is an automobile produced by Holden in Australia from 1963 to 1965. The EH was publicly released on 26 August 1963, replacing the Holden EJ series, and was the first Holden to incorporate the new red engine, with a seven main bearing crankshaft instead of the four main bearing crankshaft used in the grey engine. The newly released Red engine initially came in two capacities that being the 100 hp 149 and the 115 hp 179 cubic inch displacement. Standard issue on all models (except Premiers) was the 149 CID in either the manual or Hydramatic transmission. A lower compression 95 hp 149 was also available as an option, except on Premiers. The Premier models only received the larger 179 (HP cast block) and initially only with the Hydramatic transmission. The Hydramatic was a four-stage automatic transmission with a column shift although it effectively worked as a three-speed unit, except at full throttle. The manual transmission was a 3 speed column shift with non synchromesh first gear with synchromesh only on the second and third (top) gear. The first EH with a 179 CID engine combined with a manual gearbox was called the "EH-S4", (officially EH225M-S4) and was fitted with an upgraded manual gearbox, having stronger gears than in the 149 gear box. Other upgrades included clutch and brakes and a few other minor changes. The mainstream release of the 179 engine mated to the three speed manual transmission option across all models occurred on 10 February 1964.

A total of 256,959 EH Holdens were produced and sold from 1963 to 1965, when the EH was replaced by the Holden HD series.

== Range ==
The Holden EH range was offered in the following models:

- Standard Sedan
- Standard Station Sedan
- Special Sedan
- Special Station Sedan
- S4 Special Sedan
- Premier Sedan
- Premier Station Sedan
- Utility
- Panel van

The Station Sedan name was used on all station wagon models.

"Standard" models were basic, with no side badging, and were mostly fitted with 149-cubic-inch engines, rubber floor mats and single-tone acrylic paint finish. "Special" models came equipped with stainless moulding strips all round, special badges and optional two-tone paint jobs, still in acrylic paint. The "Premier" was the top of the range model, with a 179-cubic-inch engine and Hydramatic transmission, leather interior, bucket seats, fold-down centre armrest in the back seat, carpets, metallic paint, a centre console incorporating a heater/demister, a handbrake warning light, a boot light (in sedan models) and chrome-plated wheel trims. Contrary to popular belief a car radio was not standard equipment for the Premier. The Standard EH was the same price as its predecessor (EJ) at £1051.

The S4 Special was introduced in September 1963 for racing homologation purposes - a minimum of 100 were required to be built & sold. These featured a 179 engine, manual transmission with hardened gears, a 12 imp gal (55 L) fuel tank (9 imp gal (41 L) was standard), a more comprehensive tool kit, metal lined brake shoes and a larger tailshaft. Six were produced at the Holden Dandenong Plant and 120 at the Holden Pagewood Plant.

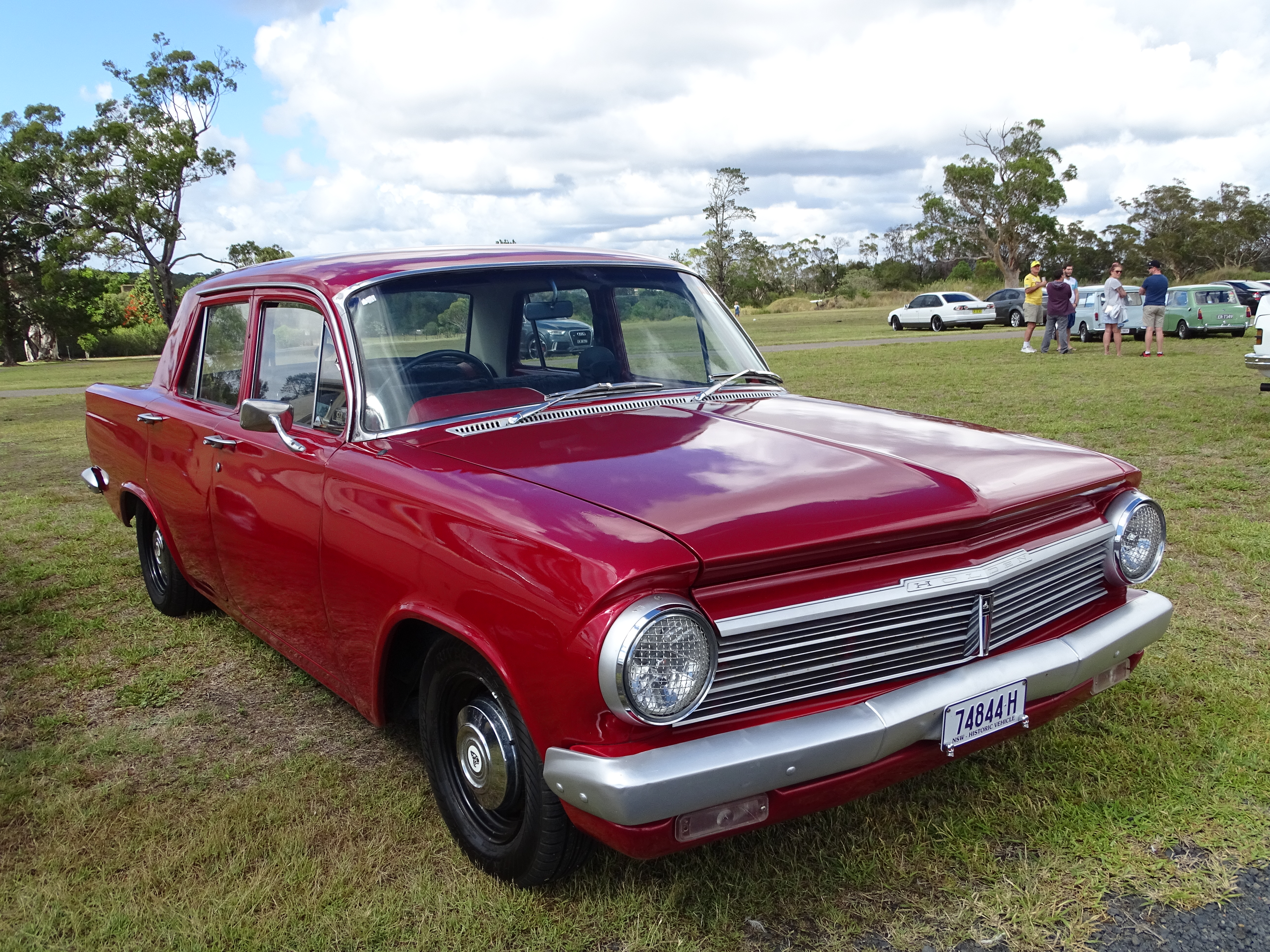
Holden Standard Sedan

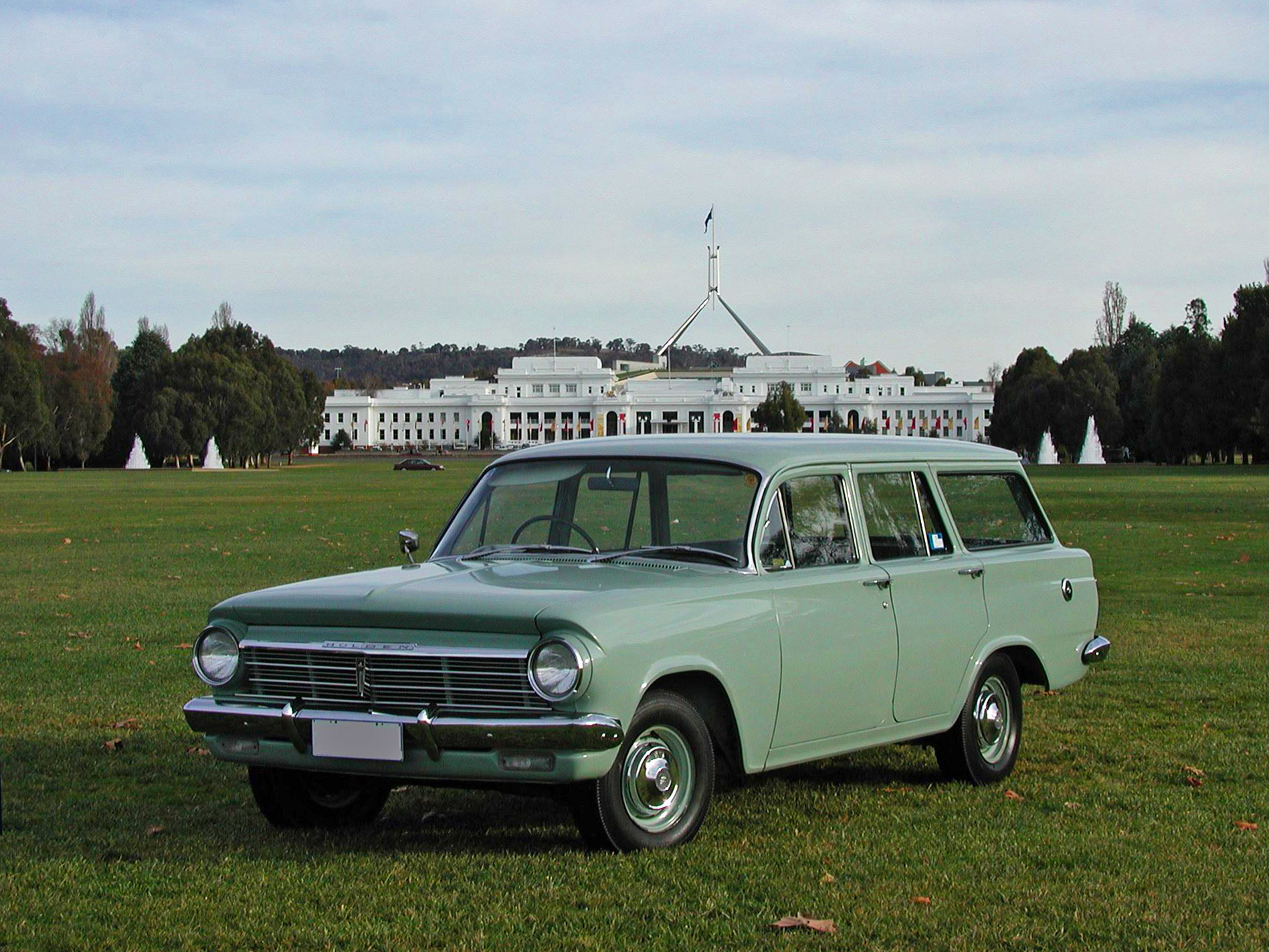
Holden Standard Station Sedan

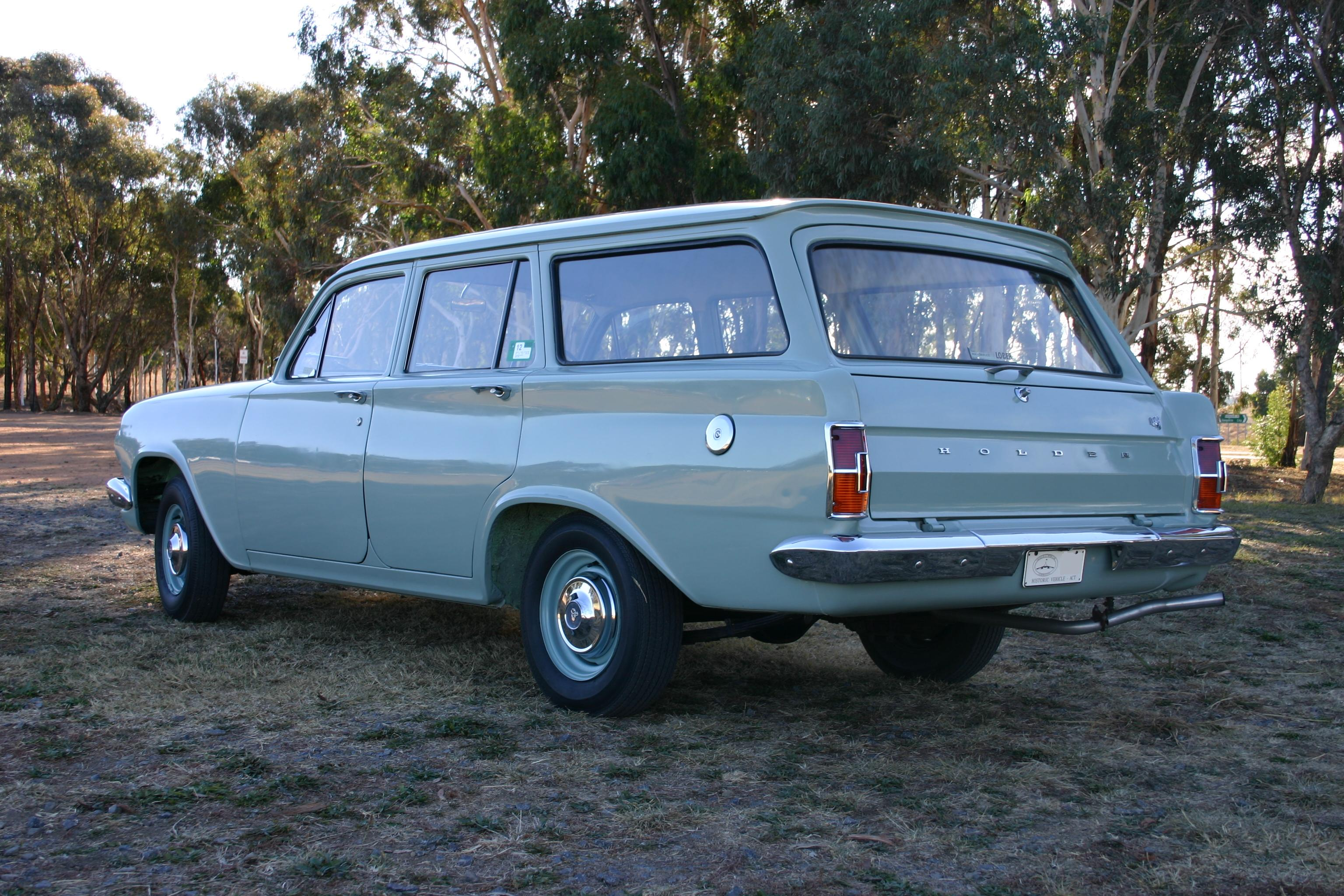
Holden Standard Station Sedan

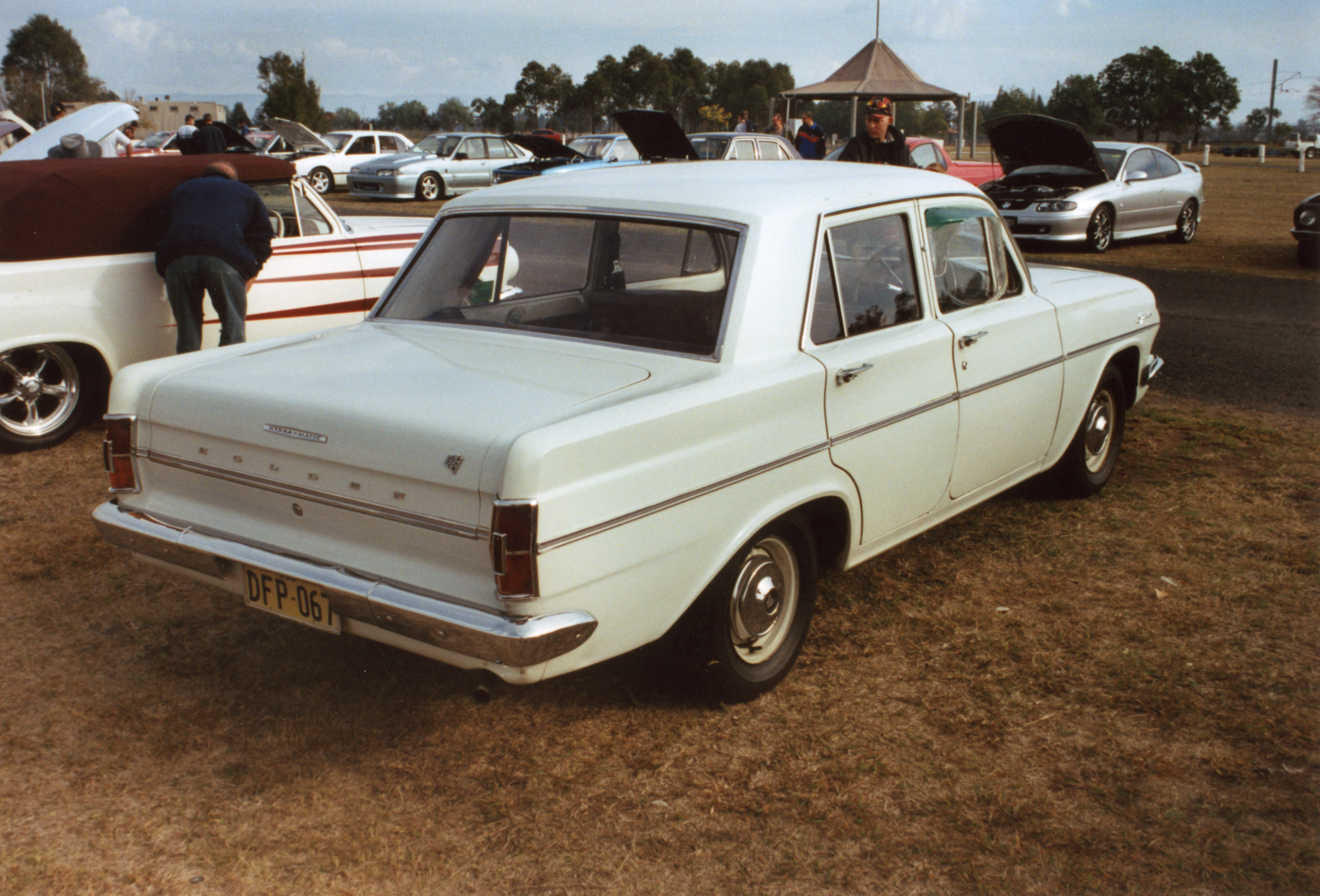
Holden Special Sedan

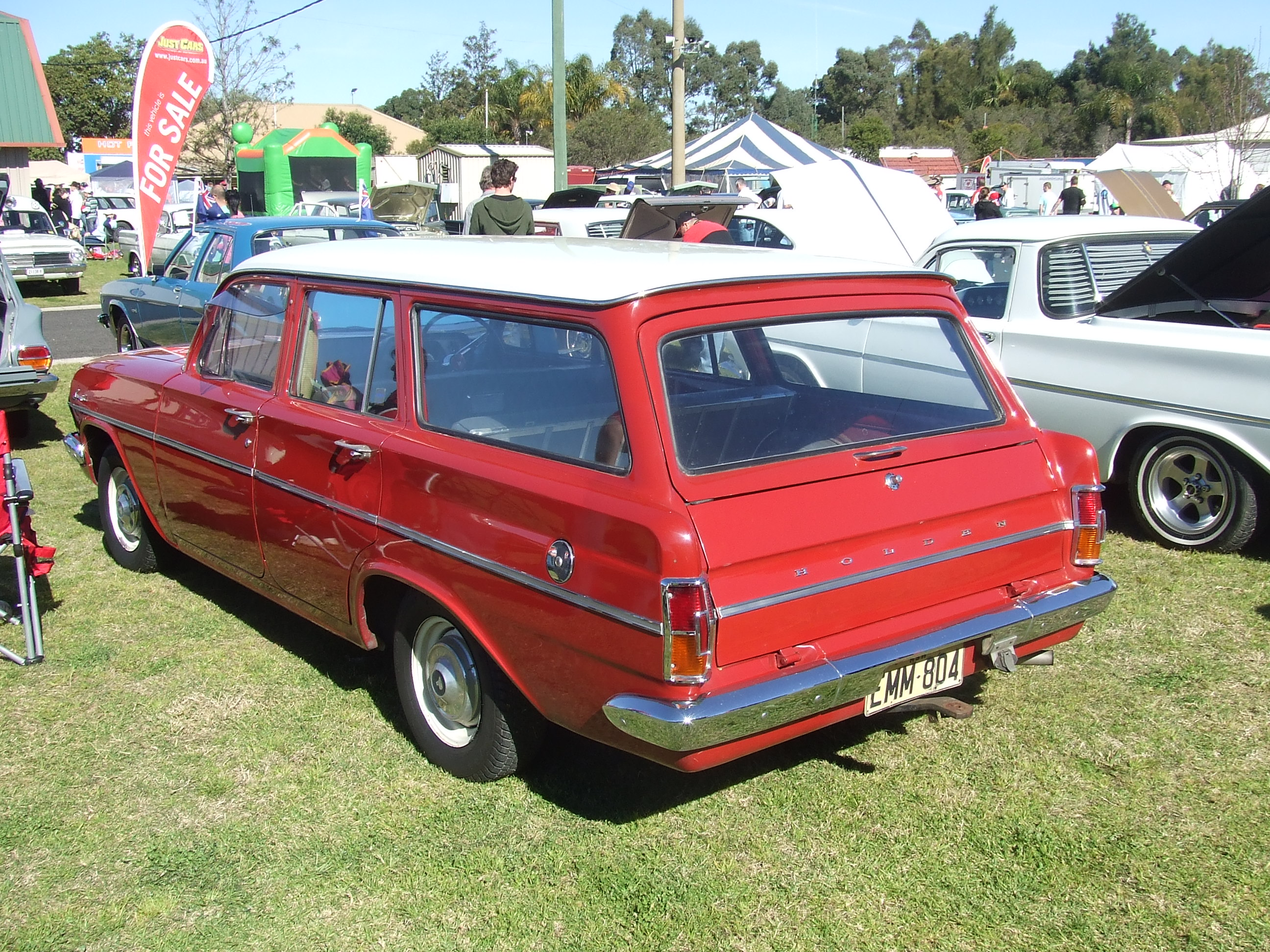
Holden Special Station Sedan

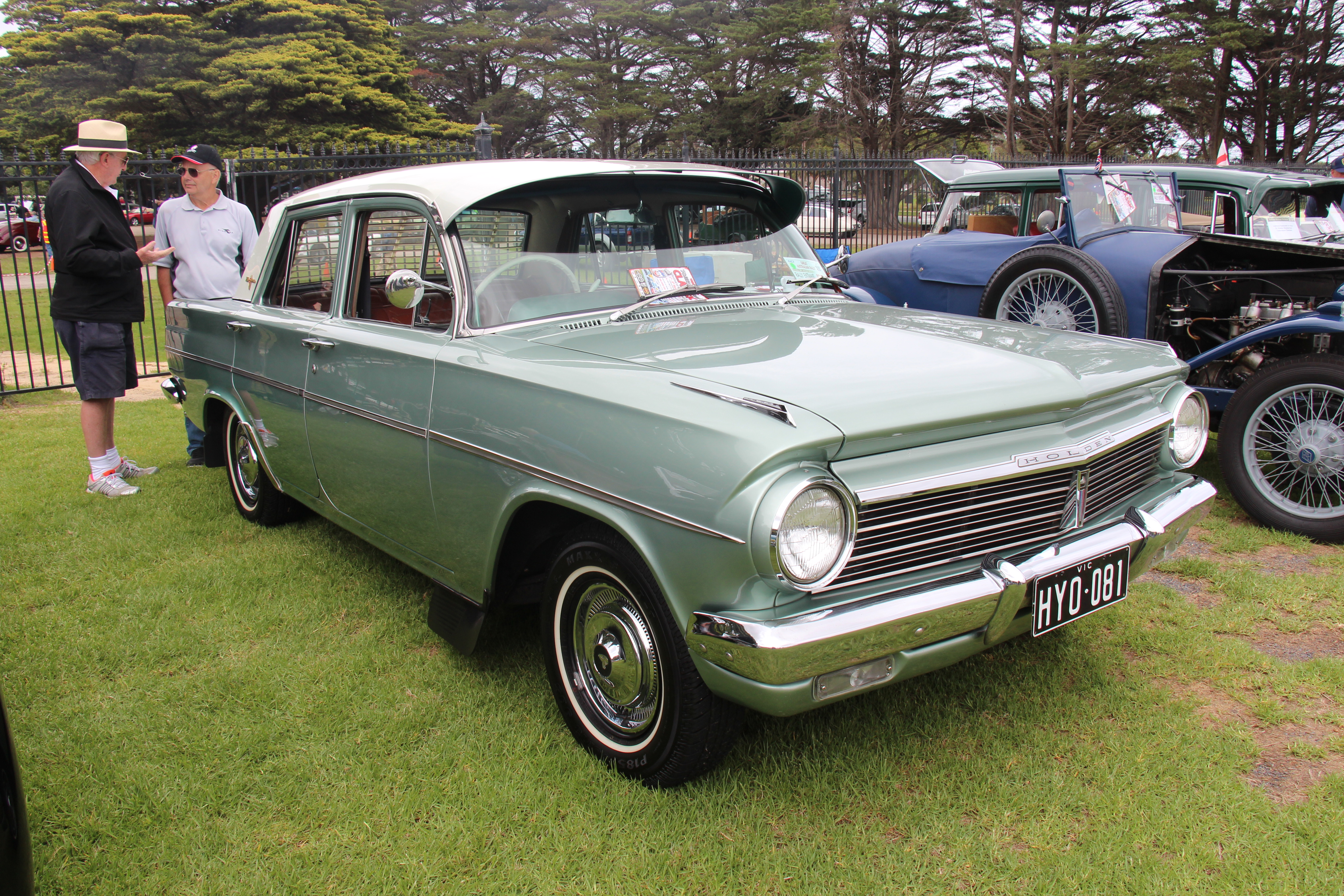
Holden Premier sedan

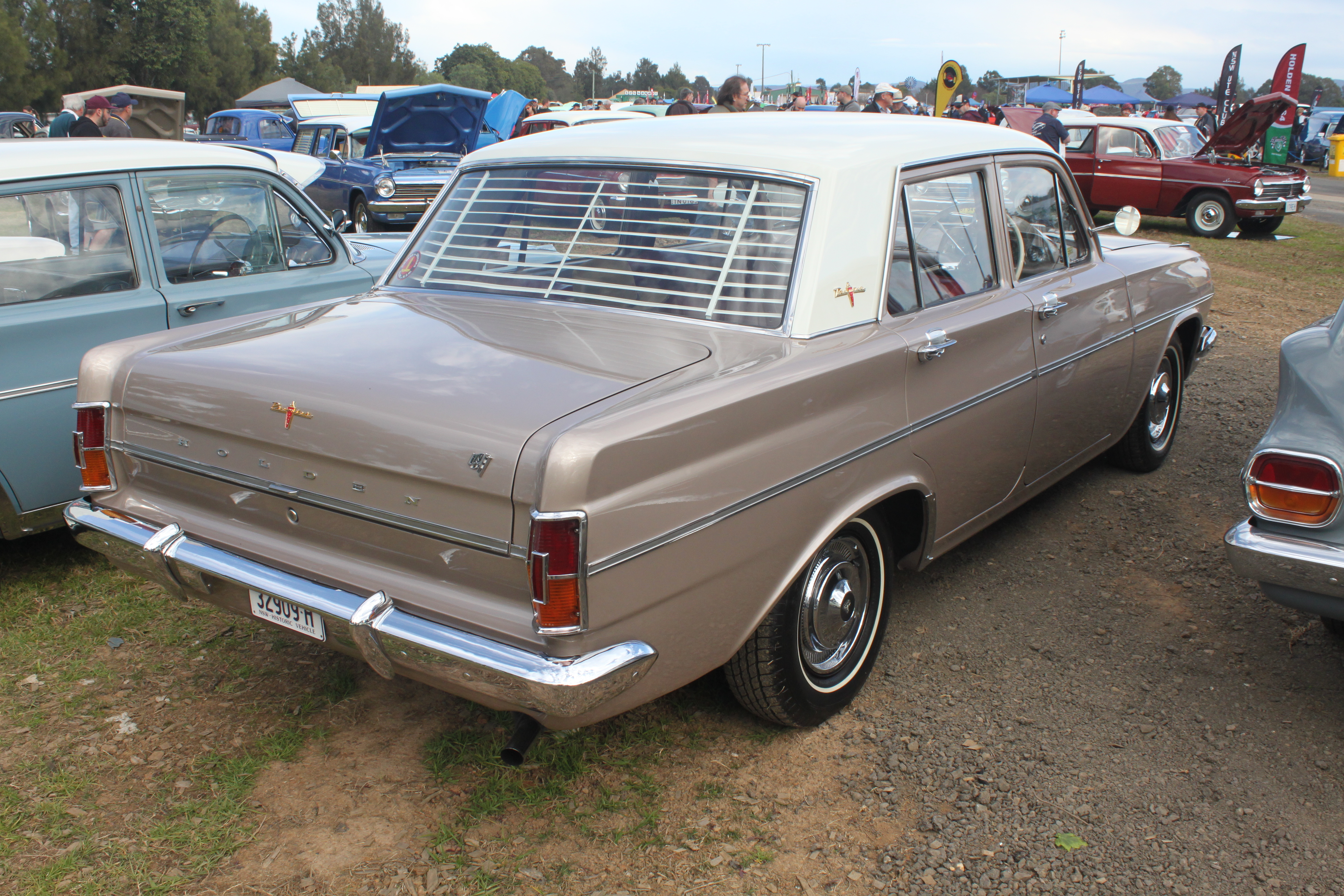
Holden Premier sedan

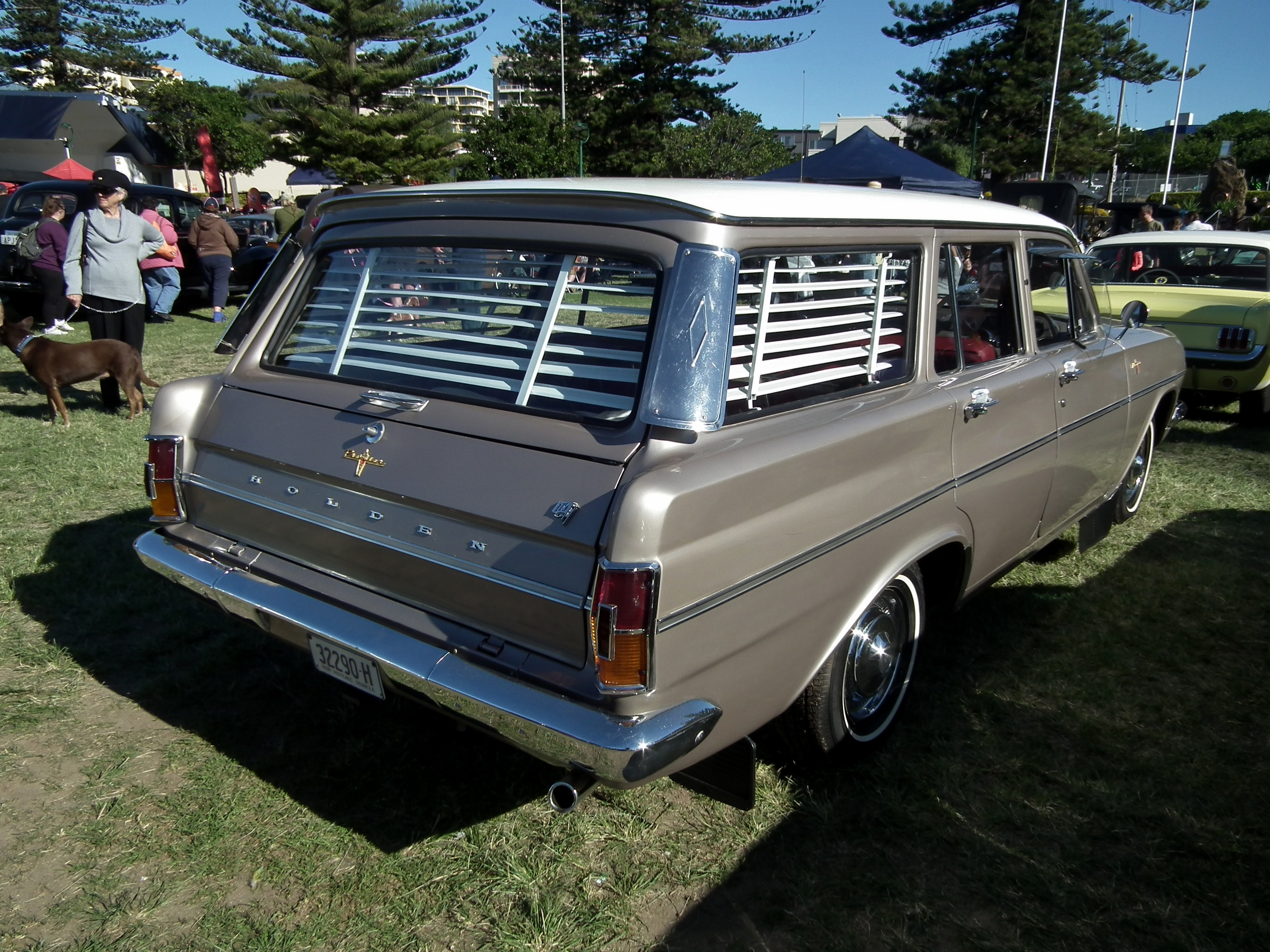
Holden Premier Station Sedan

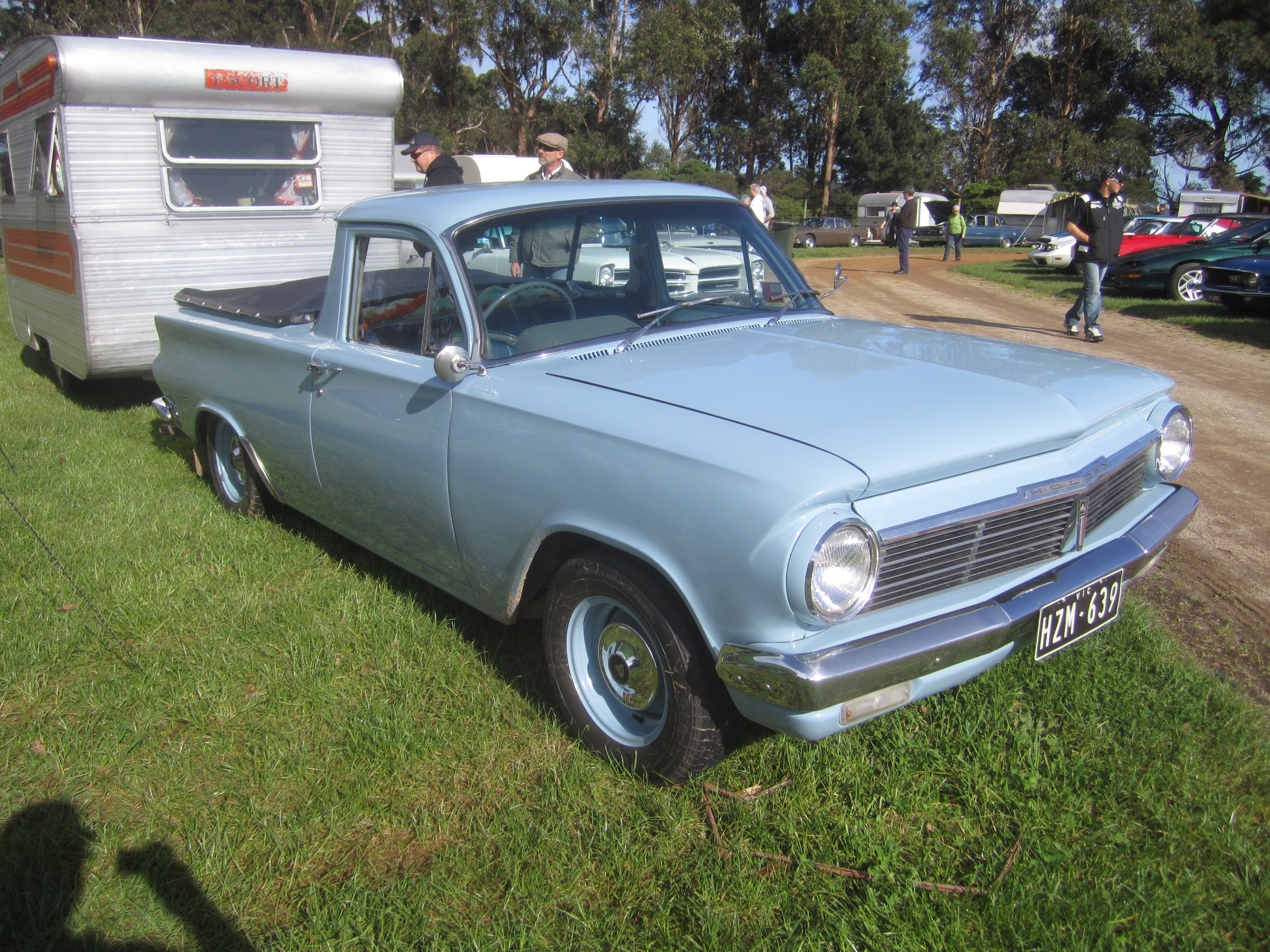
Holden Utility

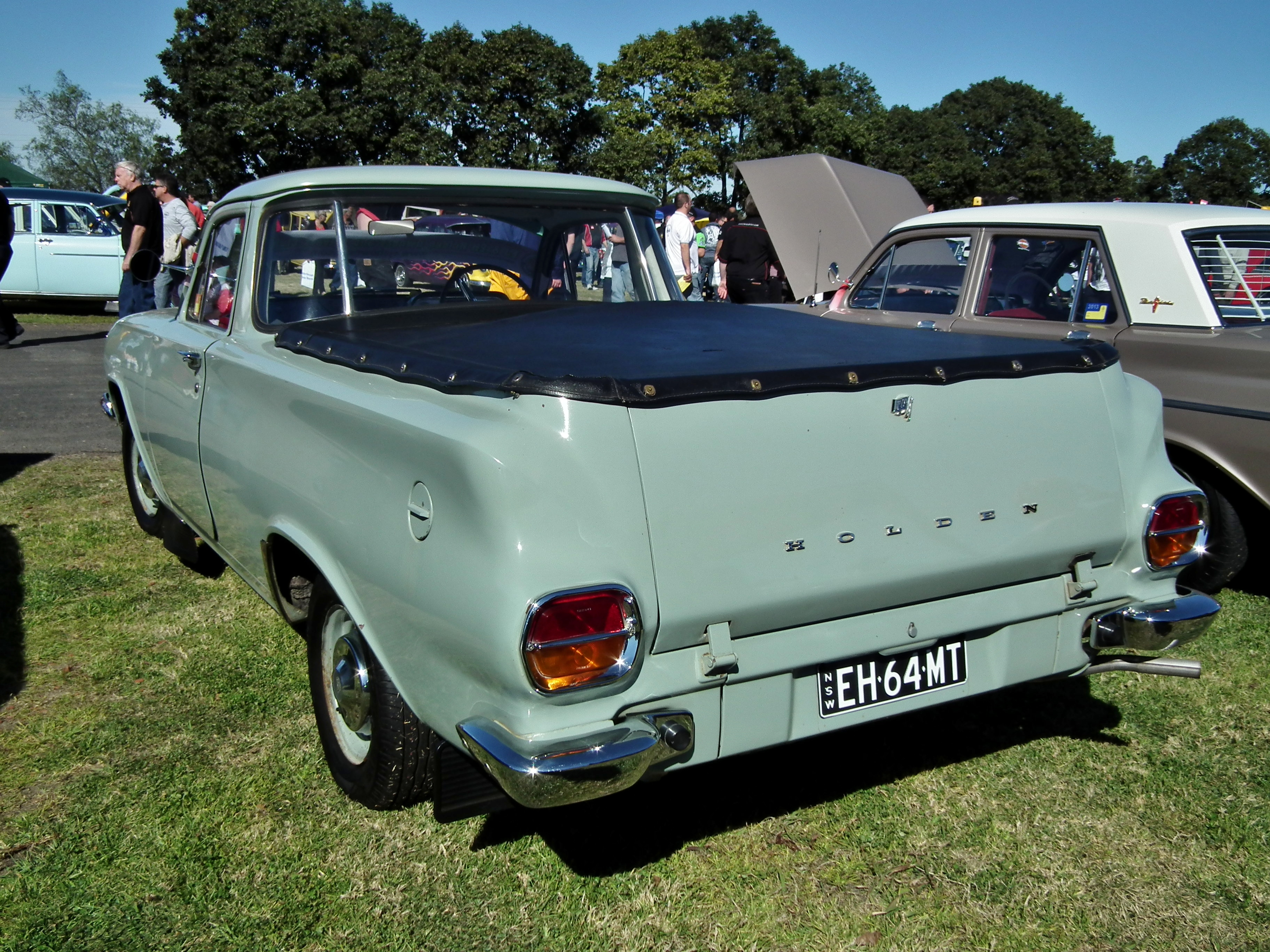
Holden Utility

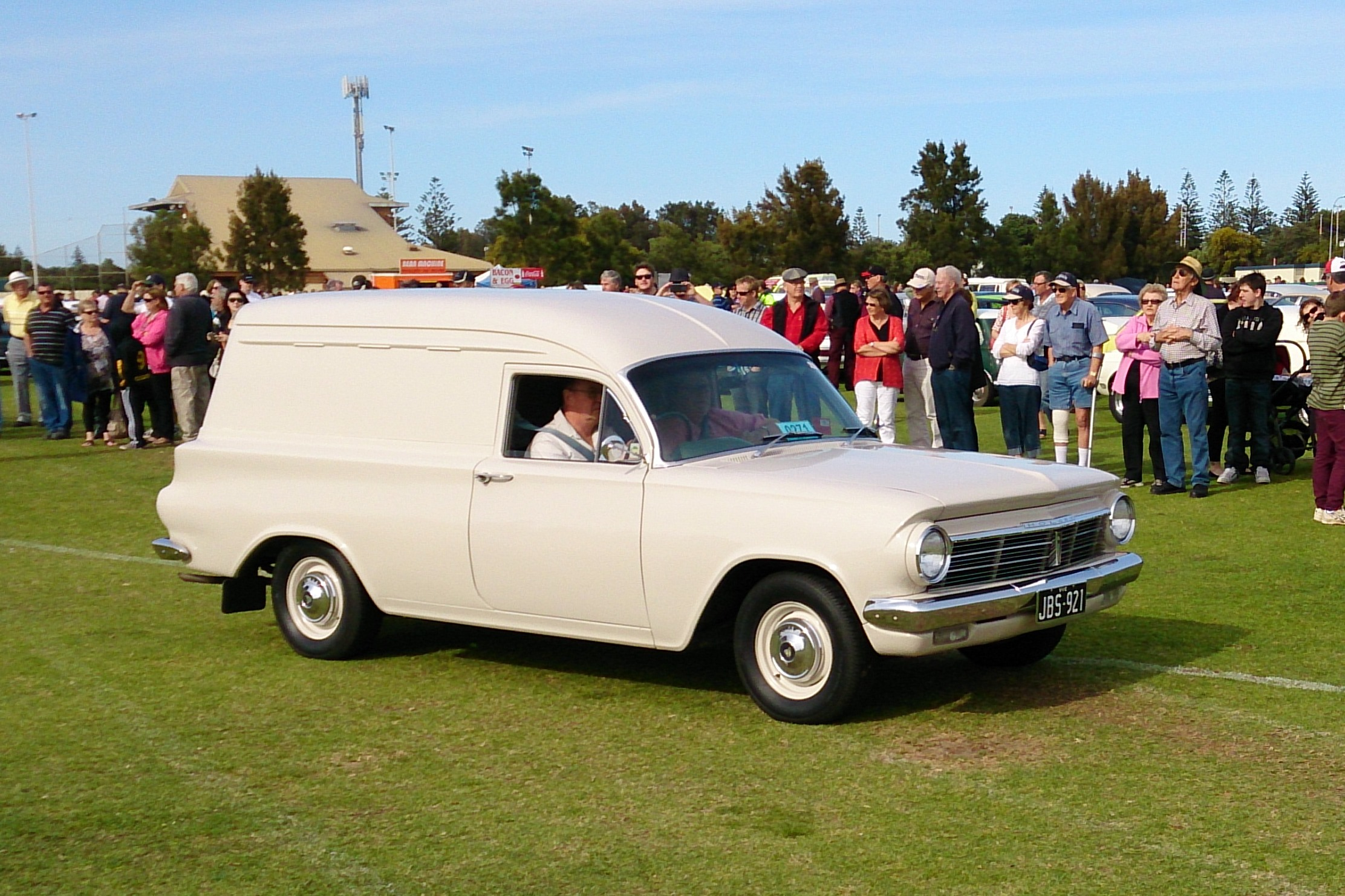
Holden Panel Van

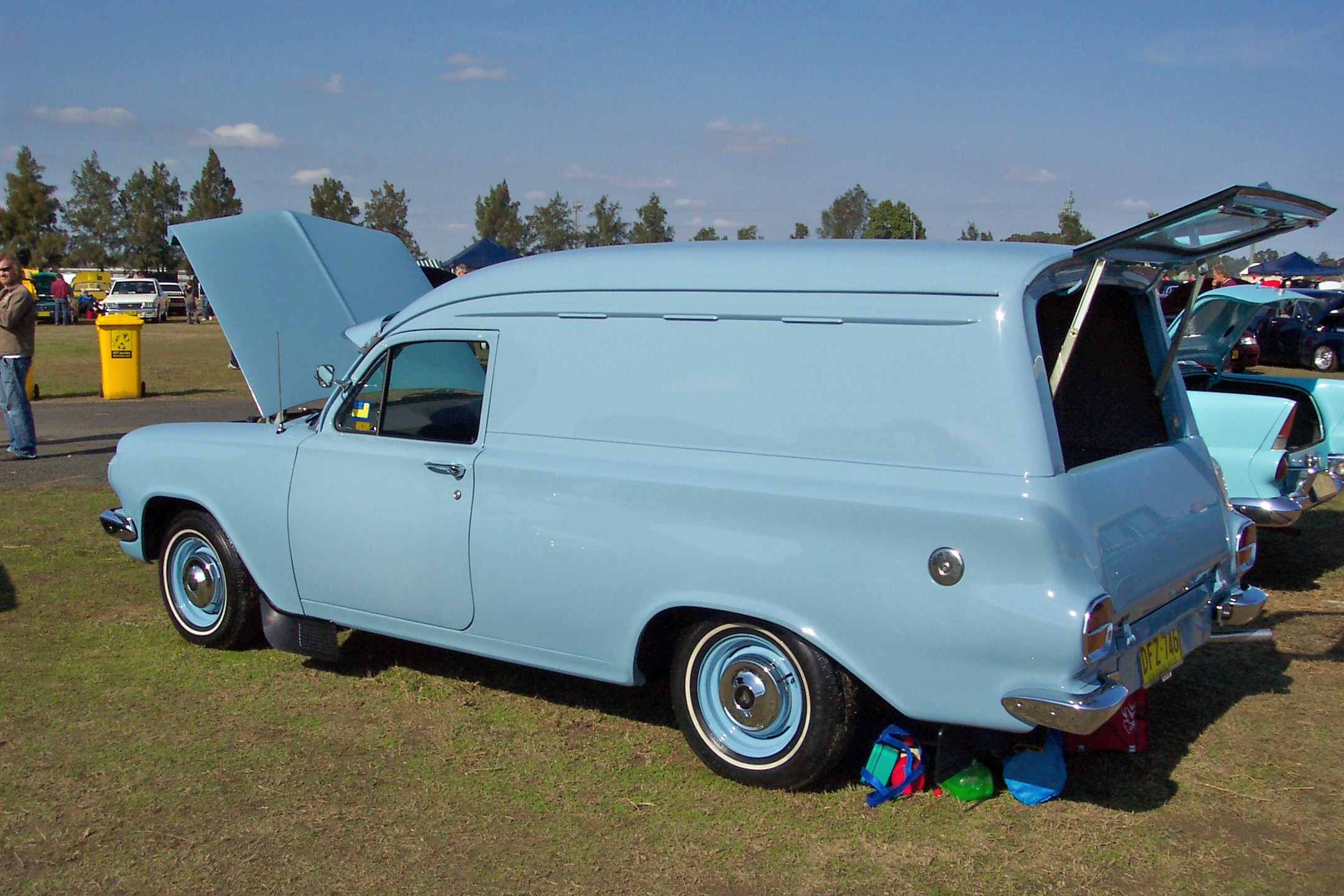
Holden Panel Van
