= 1957 Round Australia Trial (Mobilgas) =

1957 Round Australia Trial Mobilgas Rally
← Previous event	Next event →
- Host country: Australia
- Rally base: Melbourne
- Dates run: 21 August – 8 September 1957
- Stages: 35
- Stage surface: Tarmac and Gravel
- Overall distance: 14,480 km (9,000 miles)

Statistics
- Crews: 86 at start, 52 at finish

Overall results
- Overall winner: (Australia) Laurie Whitehead (Australia) Kevin Young

The 1957 Round Australia Trial, officially the Mobilgas Rally was the seventh running of the Round Australia Trial. The rally took place between 21 August and 8 September 1957. The event covered 14,480 kilometres around Australia. It was won by Laurie Whitehead and Kevin Young, driving a Volkswagen 1200.

== Results ==
Pos	No	Entrant	Drivers	Car	Penalties (Points)
1	76	(Australia) Laurie Whitehead	(Australia) Laurie Whitehead (Australia) Kevin Young	Volkswagen 1200	13
2	23	(Australia) S.J. Vaughan	(Australia) Jack Vaughan (Australia) Bob Lancet	Volkswagen 1200	28
3	18	(Australia) J.R. Hall	(Australia) John Hall (Australia) Colin Wilkinson	Volkswagen 1200	36
4	10	(Australia) E.B. Perkins	(Australia) Eddie Perkins (Australia) Les Perkins	Volkswagen 1200	65
5	50	(Australia) R.L. Foreman	(Australia) Bob Foreman (Australia) John McDougall	Volkswagen 1200	77
6	52	(Australia) Greg Cusack	(Australia) Greg Cusack (Australia) Pat Lawless	Volkswagen 1200	90
7	43	(Australia) Mrs Geordie Anderson	(Australia) Geordie Anderson (Australia) Bill Pitt (Australia) J. Abercrombie	Jaguar Mark VIII	172
8	97	(Australia) A.J. Thiel	(Australia) Ard Thiel (Australia) Mick Kimpton	Standard Vanguard Phase III	187
9	8	(Australia) A.D. Hughes	(Australia) Doug Hughes (Australia) Ken Limbrick (Australia) Ken Harper	Standard Vanguard Phase III	199
10	102	(Australia) Team Fiebig and Holness	(Australia) Lance Fiebig (Australia) Brian Holness	Holden FE	209
11	64	(Australia) Team Darby and Ruston	(Australia) Phillip Darby (Australia) John Ruston	Volkswagen 1200	215
12	12	Coles Stores Australia	(Australia) Dave Anderson (Australia) Laurie McAlister (Australia) Jack Kelley	Holden FE	223
13	62	(Australia) Doug Whiteford	(Australia) Doug Whiteford (Australia) Harry Russell	Peugeot 403	227
14	72	(Australia) Portland's Leading Traders	(Australia) Geoff Ackerman (Australia) Roy Petrie	Volkswagen 1200	231
15	35	(Australia) S.G. McGlashan	(Australia) Stan McGlashan (Australia) Patrick O'Sullivan	Volkswagen 1200	240
16	1	(Australia) Westco Motors	(Australia) Ken Anderson (Australia) M. McFadyen	Simca Aronde	263
17	60	(Australia) Diamond and Roberts	(Australia) Ron Diamond (Australia) Downes Roberts (Australia) Max McPherson	Holden FE	302
18	3	(Australia) H.H. Gunn	(Australia) Harvey Gunn (Australia) Cyril Lyons	Holden FE	322
19	98	(Australia) H.C. Heathorne & Company Limited	(Australia) Don Elliot (Australia) Mick Watt	Morris Minor 1000	328
20	55	(Australia) George Winton	(Australia) George Winton (Australia) Mal Eastmond	Volkswagen 1200	336
21	22	(New Zealand) Alma and Gerald McMillan	(New Zealand) Alma McMillan (New Zealand) Gerald McMillan	Volkswagen 1200	383
22	77	(Australia) Team Hay and Gault	(Australia) Jack Hay (Australia) Max Gault	Simca Aronde	394
23	58	(Australia) Claude Ruwolt	(Australia) Claude Ruwolt (Australia) Louise Ruwolt	Peugeot 403	448
24	101	(Australia) S.L. Archer	(Australia) Terry Archer (Australia) Don Dunoon	Volkswagen 1200	472
25	5	(Australia) Team Lindner and Boles	(Australia) William Lindner (Australia) Levi Boles	Volkswagen 1200	492
26	73	(Australia) H.R. Smith	(Australia) Harry Smith (Australia) Peter Staines	Volkswagen 1200	504
27	93	(Germany) Dr. Ing. h.c. F. Porsche KG	(Australia) Tom Jackson (Australia) David McKay	Porsche 356 A	539
28	26	(Australia) Claridge Motors Limited	(Australia) Fred Claridge (Australia) Len Claridge (Australia) Max Steer	Holden FE	561
29	41	(Australia) Malcolm McPherson, Jr.	(Australia) Malcolm McPherson, Jr. (Australia) Robert Stevens	Volkswagen 1200	602
30	68	(Australia) C.R. Turner	(Australia) Claude Turner (Australia) Bob Holden	Hillman Minx	618
31	44	(Australia) Hasthorpe Brothers	(Australia) George Hasthorpe (Australia) J. Hasthorpe (Australia) E. Pentland	Holden FE	685
32	16	(Australia) Frank Bradshaw	(Australia) Frank Bradshaw (Australia) Geoff Fortune (Australia) S. Armstrong	Holden FE	695
33	75	(Australia) Keith Gamble	(Australia) Keith Gamble (Australia) Lorna Gamble	Volkswagen 1200	719
34	31	(Australia) H.R. Krieg	(Australia) Harry Krieg (Australia) K. Moore (Australia) Albert Calnan	Holden FE	792
35	48	(Australia) Federal Woollen Mills Limited	(Australia) Jim Keddie (Australia) Arthur Smith (Australia) Robert Riley	Ford 1954 Customline	865
36	79	(Australia) Team Leech and Vincent	(Australia) Ron Leech (Australia) George Vincent	Holden FJ	924
37	32	(Australia) Eric Anderson Radio-Television Pty Ltd	(Australia) Peter Anderson (Australia) Terence Allen	Holden FE	960
38	63	(Australia) H.L. Firth	(Australia) Harry Firth (Australia) Maurie Monk	Standard Vanguard Phase III	1,018
39	40	(Australia) Team Holden, Sharpley and McNamara	(Australia) Keith Holden (Australia) Alan Sharpley (Australia) B. McNamara	Ford Zephyr Mark II	1,081
40	21	(Australia) Bill Hurley	(Australia) Jack Place (Australia) Bill Hurley	Volkswagen 1200	1,140
41	7	(Australia) Zupps Motors	(Australia) Evan Thomas (Australia) Garth Llewellyn (Australia) Jack Phillpott	Volkswagen 1200	1,168
42	38	(Australia) Brifield Service Station	(Australia) Alan Jack (Australia) R. Burns	Simca Aronde	1,183
43	37	(Australia) L.E. Howes	(Australia) Lawrence Howes (Australia) James Davenport	Volkswagen 1200	1,190
44	53	(Australia) K.E. Jones	(Australia) Keith Jones (Australia) N. Wise (Australia) Max Duncan	Holden FE	1,204
45	30	(Australia) G.N. Horner	(Australia) George Horner (Australia) Robert Mills	Ford 1956 Customline	1,290
46	67	(New Caledonia) Agence Alma	(New Caledonia) Jacques Leraux (Australia) Phil Irving (New Caledonia) Andre Jacquet	Citroën DS 19	1,493
47	100	(Japan) Toyota Motor Sales Company Limited	(Japan) Kunio Kaminomura (Australia) Lindsey Hedley (Japan) Kojiro Kondo	Toyopet Crown Model RS Deluxe	1,515
48	17	(New Zealand) Noel Dickson	(New Zealand) Noel Dickson (New Zealand) John Chapman	Ford Anglia	1,712
49	2	(Australia) C.C. Scott	(Australia) Cliff Scott (Australia) Ron Jones (Australia) John Slade (Australia) Tom O'Brien	Ford 1950 Custom	1,902
50	81	(Australia) Associated Industrial Designers	(Australia) George Baird (Australia) Mat Walton	Ford 1956 Customline	1,951
51	80	(Australia) Bruce Wilkinson	(Australia) Bruce Wilkinson (Australia) Fred Townsing	Austin A70 Hampshire	2,595
52	88	(Australia) Norma Harrison	(Australia) Norma Harrison (Australia) Audrey Millgate	Volkswagen 1200	3,943
