= 1958 Round Australia Trial (Ampol) =

1958 Round Australia Trial Ampol Trial
← Previous event	Next event →
- Host country: Australia
- Rally base: Sydney
- Dates run: 18 May – 1 June 1958
- Stages: 26
- Stage surface: Tarmac and Gravel
- Overall distance: 12,070 km (7,500 miles)

Statistics
- Crews: 148 at start, 84 at finish

Overall results
- Overall winner: (Australia) Don Garard (Australia) Jim Roberts (Australia) A.C. McGrath and Company

The 1958 Round Australia Trial, officially the Ampol Trial was the eighth running of the Round Australia Trial. The rally took place between 18 May and 1 June 1958. The event covered 12,070 kilometres around Australia. It was won by Don Garard and Jim Roberts, driving a Holden FE.

== Results ==
Pos	No	Entrant	Drivers	Car	Penalties (Points)
1	158	(Australia) A.C. McGrath and Company	(Australia) Don Garard (Australia) Jim Roberts	Holden FE	9
2	7	(Australia) A.D. Hughes	(Australia) Doug Hughes (Australia) Ken Harper	Standard Vanguard Phase III	10
3	75	(Australia) J.A. Witter	(Australia) Jack Witter (Australia) Doug Stewart	Volkswagen 1200	10
4	136	(Australia) Alan Coffey Motors	(Australia) Peter Coffey (Australia) Robin Petty (Australia) D. Irwin	Ford Zephyr Mark II	12
5	135	(Australia) Flamingo Motors	(Australia) Harley Mehegan (Australia) Laurie Macalister	Peugeot 403	15
6	28	(Australia) Regal Motors	(Australia) Malcolm Brooks (Australia) Frank Tate	Standard Vanguard Phase III	22
7	29	(Australia) Ray Christie	(Australia) Ray Christie (Australia) David Dunlop	Volkswagen 1200	23
8	84	(Australia) Jack Davey	(Australia) Jack Davey (Australia) Bill Murray (Australia) Bill Murison	Chrysler Royal V8 AP1	25
9	1	(Australia) R.E. Gudgeon	(Australia) Bob Gudgeon (Australia) Alan Platt	Peugeot 403	29
10	88	(Australia) George Reynolds	(Australia) George Reynolds (Australia) Ivan Tighe	Volkswagen 1200	31
11	63	(Australia) Reg Smith	(Australia) Reg Smith (Australia) Unknown	Volkswagen 1200	40
12	161	(Australia) Team Gilbert and Tosh	(Australia) Allan Gilbert (Australia) Sid Tosh	Simca Aronde	40
13	87	(New Zealand) Mrs R.E. Corbett	(New Zealand) Ruth Corbett (Australia) Eric Vigar (Australia) John LeFoe	Holden FE	43
14	54	(Australia) Bill Wilcox	(Australia) Bill Wilcox (Australia) Jack Tremain (Australia) Ron Liley	Peugeot 403	51
15	41	(Australia) G. Green	(Australia) Stan Donney (Australia) Peter Orr	Peugeot 403	52
16	160	Standard Motor Company (Australia) Limited	(Australia) Harry Firth (Australia) Ern Abbott	Standard Vanguard Phase III	55
17	152	(Australia) Mrs Beryl Withers	(Australia) Beryl Withers (Australia) Arthur Withers (Australia) Frank Burke	Holden FJ	786
18	59	(Australia) Dean and Weston	(Australia) John Dean (Australia) Jeff Weston	Volkswagen 1200	57
19	34	(Australia) S.G. McGlashan	(Australia) Stan McGlashan (Australia) Patrick O'Sullivan	Volkswagen 1200	61
20	107	(Australia) David McKay	(Australia) David McKay (Australia) Desmond Tester (Australia) Digby Cooke	Ford Zephyr Mark II	64
21	138	(Australia) David Marks	(Australia) David Marks (Australia) Peter Simpson (Australia) Les Frost	Ford 1956 Customline	69
22	132	(Australia) J.T. Byrne	(Australia) John Bryne (Australia) Leon Sly	Morris Minor 1000	72
23	34	(Australia) Palmer's Garage	(Australia) A. McQuade (Australia) G. Porter	Volkswagen 1200	74
24	87	(Australia) L.A. Corzens	(Australia) Leslie Corzens (Australia) Norm Enright (Australia) Ron Bell	Holden FE	75
25	10	(Australia) Team Kingham and Frazer	(Australia) Rod Kingham (Australia) Tom Frazer	Morris Minor 1000	80
26	40	(Australia) James Farrow	(Australia) James Farrow (Australia) Fred Fear (Australia) Brian Higgins	Ford 1956 Customline	85
27	42	(Australia) Garard's Taxi Trucks and Hire Cars	(Australia) John Garard (Australia) Greg Garard (Australia) Ross Garard	Holden FE	85
28	58	(Australia) Monumental Motors	(Australia) John Harrison (Australia) Keith Fry	Austin Lancer	86
29	17	(Australia) Vic Wilson	(Australia) Vic Wilson (Australia) Warren Wilson (Australia) Leon Martin	Simca Aronde	90
30	133	(Australia) John Priddle	(Australia) John Priddle (Australia) Ian Paul	Ford Zephyr Mark II	90
31	99	(Australia) Albert Griffin	(Australia) Albert Griffin (Australia) Ted Hillman	Peugeot 203	104
32	137	(Australia) George Williams	(Australia) George Williams (Australia) L. Baverstock	Peugeot 203	105
33	82	(Australia) J.E. Murray	(Australia) Jack 'Gelignite' Murray (Australia) Dave Johnson	Fiat 1100	109
34	105	(Australia) Team Wallace and Flynn	(Australia) Maurice Wallace (Australia) Jim Flynn (Australia) Stan Wheeler	Dodge 1956 Kingsway	110
35	54	(Australia) Team Waples and Watt	(Australia) Bruce Waples (Australia) Neil Watt	Peugeot 403	112
36	115	(Australia) Barry Motors	(Australia) Colin Bowden (Australia) Neville Dalmain	Morris Major	117
37	2	(Australia) Ken Tucker	(Australia) Ken Tucker (Australia) Alan Tucker	Porsche 356 A	131
38	157	(Australia) Ken Tubman	(Australia) Ken Tubman (Australia) John Evans	Simca Aronde	135
39	68	(Australia) Laurie Sanders	(Australia) Laurie Sanders (Australia) Norm Enright (Australia) Ron Bell	Holden FE	135
40	41	(Australia) Bob Scarlett	(Australia) Bob Scarlett (Australia) Ron Mountford (Australia) Ken Maxfield	Standard Vanguard Phase II	137
41	16	(Australia) Mrs Mary Murray	(Australia) Mary Murray (Australia) Fred Murray (Australia) Dick Webb	Ford Consul Mark II	145
42	146	(Australia) Tubby Black	(Australia) Tubby Black (Australia) Jack Luckey (Australia) Ted Humphreys	Holden FC	150
43	85	(Australia) Bombadier Motors	(Australia) Ronald Green (Australia) Keith Wilson	Peugeot 403	161
44	140	(Australia) Edward Patten	(Australia) Edward Patten (Australia) Russell Linabury	Austin Lancer	172
45	119	(Australia) Robert and Graeme Bunge	(Australia) Robert Bunge (Australia) Graeme Bunge	Fiat 1100	174
46	36	(Australia) Delore Motors	(Australia) Elaine Lenaghan (Australia) Reg Lenaghan	Morris Major	179
47	43	(Australia) Team Kook and Ritchie	(Australia) Greig Kook (Australia) John Ritchie	Volkswagen 1200	183
48	62	(Australia) Trevor Presland	(Australia) Trevor Presland (Australia) Ian Presland (Australia) John McGill	Holden 48-215	184
49	26	(Australia) Mrs Dorothy Betts	(Australia) Dorothy Betts (Australia) J.E. Betts	Peugeot 403	189
50	13	(Australia) Norm Porter	(Australia) Norm Porter (Australia) Allan Rost	Morris Minor 1000	190
51	123	(Australia) Peter Lloyd Limited	(Australia) Peter Holder (Australia) Unknown	Morris Minor 1000	196
52	4	(Australia) Leslie Young	(Australia) Lesile Young (Australia) Unknown	Morris Minor 1000	200
53	89	(Australia) Lorna and Keith Gamble	(Australia) Keith Gamble (Australia) Lorna Gamble (Australia) Joan Cass	Volkswagen 1200	206
54	86	(Australia) Lance Fiebig	(Australia) Lance Fiebig (Australia) Brian Holness	Holden FC	215
55	22	(Australia) Alan Crabbe	(Australia) Alan Crabbe (Australia) Unknown	Peugeot 203	223
56	49	(Australia) Team Lloyd and Machin	(Australia) Barry Lloyd (Australia) Bill Machin	Morris Minor 1000	237
57	26	(Australia) Team Pollack, Williamson and Germyn	(Australia) Kevin Pollack (Australia) Bernie Williamson (Australia) Boyd Germyn	Peugeot 403	281
58	126	(Australia) Team Drew and Cousins	(Australia) Harvey Drew (Australia) Bill Cousins	Standard Ten	284
59	130	(Australia) Robert Hawke	(Australia) Robert Hawke (Australia) Mrs J. Hawke	Holden FJ	284
60	114	(Australia) Team Hogan, Baartz and Gablonski	(Australia) Barry Lloyd (Australia) Bill Machin	Morris Minor 1000	237
61	45	(Australia) Team Sheedy and Frazer	(Australia) Col Sheedy (Australia) Rod Fraser	Volkswagen 1200	292
62	5	(Australia) Vernon Curtin	(Australia) Vernon Curtin (Australia) Ken Shaw (Australia) Alwyn Batty	Morris Minor 1000	300
63	65	(Australia) Team Williams and James	(Australia) Howard Williams (Australia) Clarrie James	Volkswagen 1200	300
64	71	(Australia) J.L. Halls	(Australia) John Halls (Australia) Dennis Clark	Morris Minor 1000	302
65	20	(Australia) Broons Motors	(Australia) J. Newell (Australia) B. Brown	Ford Anglia	311
66	56	(Australia) Lloyd-Hartnett Distributors	(Australia) Ron McNair (Australia) Clyde Hodgins	Lloyd-Hartnett	323
67	64	(Australia) Motors Limited	(Australia) T. Colin (Australia) D. Brian (Australia) H. Ron	Morris Major	344
68	64	(Australia) Ron Dunbier	(Australia) Ron Dunbier (Australia) Earnie Matherson	Morris Isis	392
69	3	(Australia) Allen Harrison	(Australia) Ken Brigden (Australia) Allen Harrison	Peugeot 403	424
70	102	(Australia) Alma and Hughie McClelland	(Australia) Alma McClelland (Australia) Yvonne Jurgenson (Australia) Hughie McClelland	Holden FJ	429
71	98	(Australia) Leo Shallard	(Australia) Leo Shallard (Australia) Ian Jackson (Australia) Chas Caughey	Ford 1954 Customline	558
72	81	(Australia) Graeme Spencer	(Australia) Graeme Spencer (Australia) Ron Maloney	Volkswagen 1200	535
73	21	(Australia) Team Newton and Grinsell	(Australia) Ron Newton (Australia) Harold Grinsell	Ford 1956 Customline	558
74	14	(Australia) Lloyd-Hartnett Distributors	(Australia) Tony Harbutt (Australia) Geoff Reynolds	Lloyd-Hartnett	591
75	55	(Australia) Johann Rehders	(Australia) Johann Rehders (Australia) John O'Donnell	Volkswagen 1200	709
76	108	(Australia) Roy Castle	(Australia) Roy Castle (Australia) Etic Hood (Australia) Norm Crewdson	Ford 1954 Customline	722
77	124	(Australia) C.E. Hook	(Australia) Charles Hook (Australia) Vera Bayliss (Australia) Brian Bates	Morris Major	762
78	73	(Australia) Mrs Blanche Brown	(Australia) Blanche Brown (Australia) Vince Brown (Australia) Cathy Price	Rolls-Royce Phantom I	818
79	51	(Australia) Stevron Motors	(Australia) Don Scott (Australia) Mrs M. Upton	Renault Dauphine	960
80	72	(Australia) Peter Lloyd	(Australia) Maureen Lanagan (Australia) Barbara Turnbull (Australia) Patsy Owens	Morris Major	1,206
81	50	(Australia) Dr. Ivan Markovics	(Australia) Ivan Markovics (Australia) Bebe McNab (Australia) Bill Jones	Renault Frégate	1,270
82	32	(Australia) Team Sheedy and Meyn	(Australia) Keith Sheedy (Australia) Eric Meyn	Renault Dauphine	1,426
83	35	(Australia) Mrs Norma Williamson	(Australia) Norma Williamson (Australia) William Williamson	Holden 48-215	1,721
84	104	(Australia) Warren Motors	(Australia) Jack Warren (Australia) John Hall	Renault Dauphine	2,094
