= Round Australia Trial =

Long-distance motorsport event

The Round Australia Trial is a long distance rally (a form of motorsport that takes place on public or private roads), which was run on multiple occasions between 1953 and 1998 and will return in 2029, circumnavigating Australia. Its early years were tremendously popular as the roads through large portions of the country, particularly west of Adelaide, were unformed. Automobile manufacturers enthused over the event as it provided a particularly severe test event for their products, proving their cars were able to stand up to whatever conditions remote Australia could provide. Early editions of the event were heroic tests and were front-page fodder for the newspapers of the era.

By the 1960s, interest had waned as circuit racing, particularly the Bathurst 500 and the Tasman Series, would come to dominate Australian motorsport. A revival event in 1979 won by superstar touring car driver Peter Brock proved popular, but was not repeated until 16 years later in 1995. Interest in a new event continues to appear from time to time, sometimes as a rally, sometimes as a historic event for period cars, although the Australian Safari and the Finke Desert Race retain positions as the toughest off-road event in the country.

== Redex Reliability Trial ==
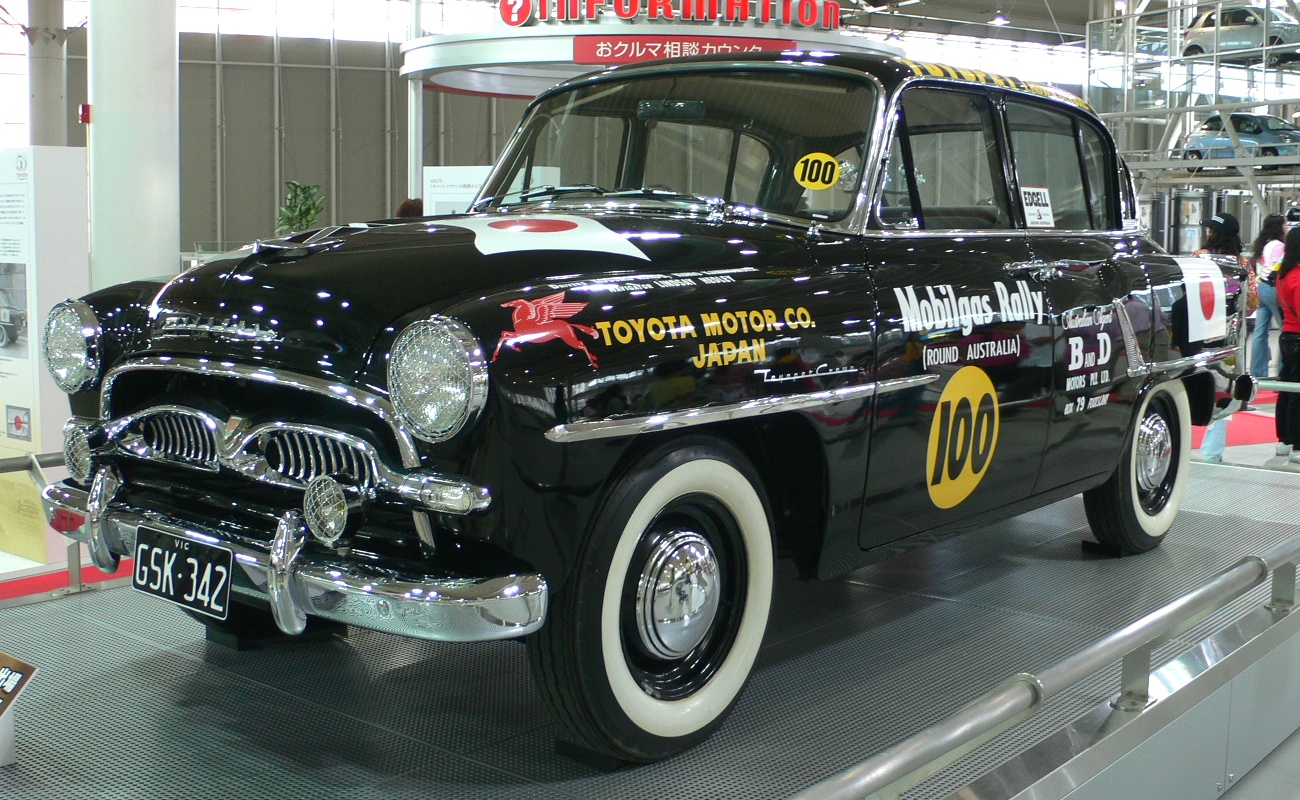
The Toyopet Crown which placed 47th overall in the 1957 Mobilgas Rally. It was crewed by Kunio Kaminomura, Kojiro Kondo and Lindsay Hedley.

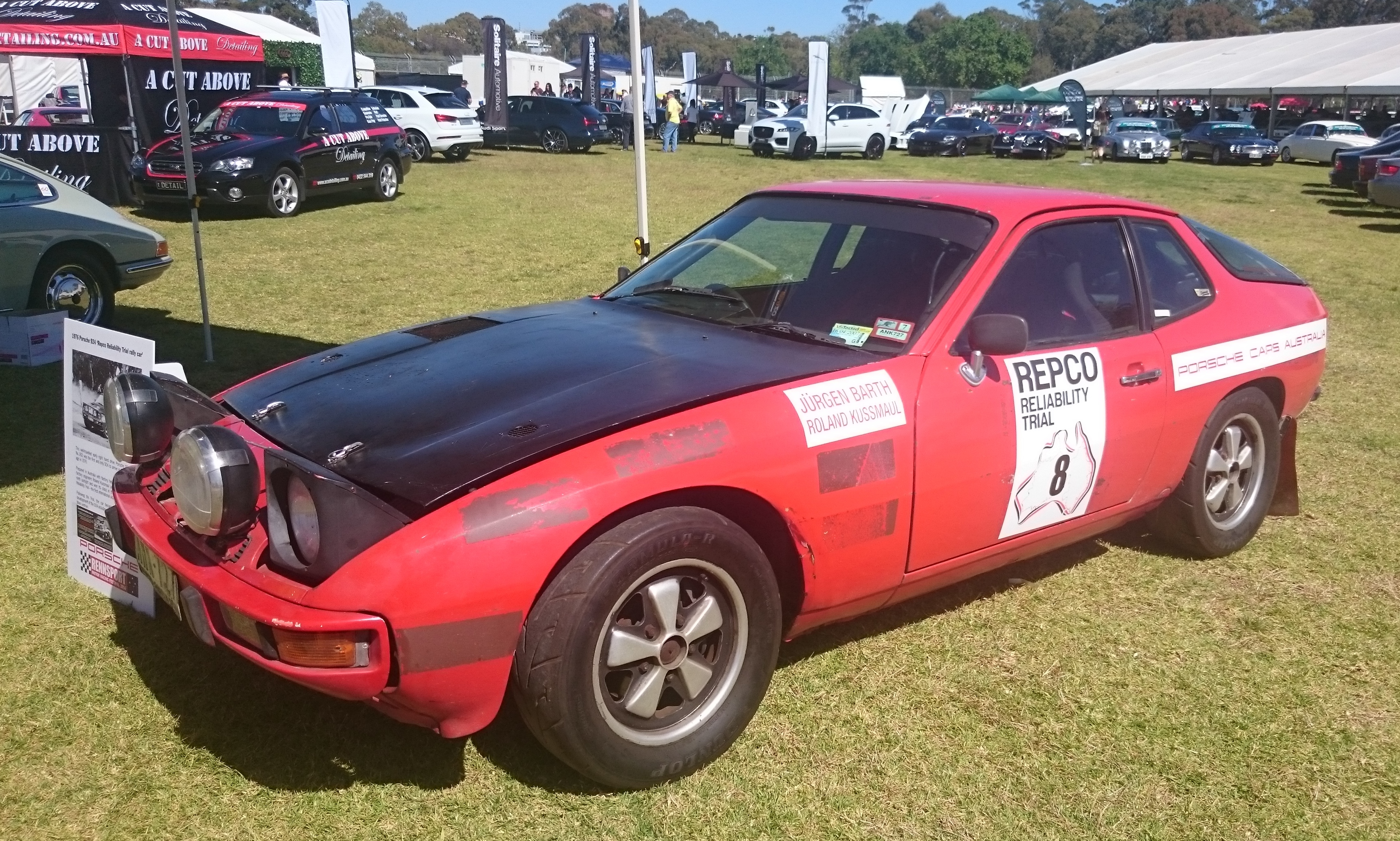
The Porsche 924 in which Jürgen Barth and Roland Kushmaul placed ninth outright and won their class in the 1979 Repco Reliability Trial

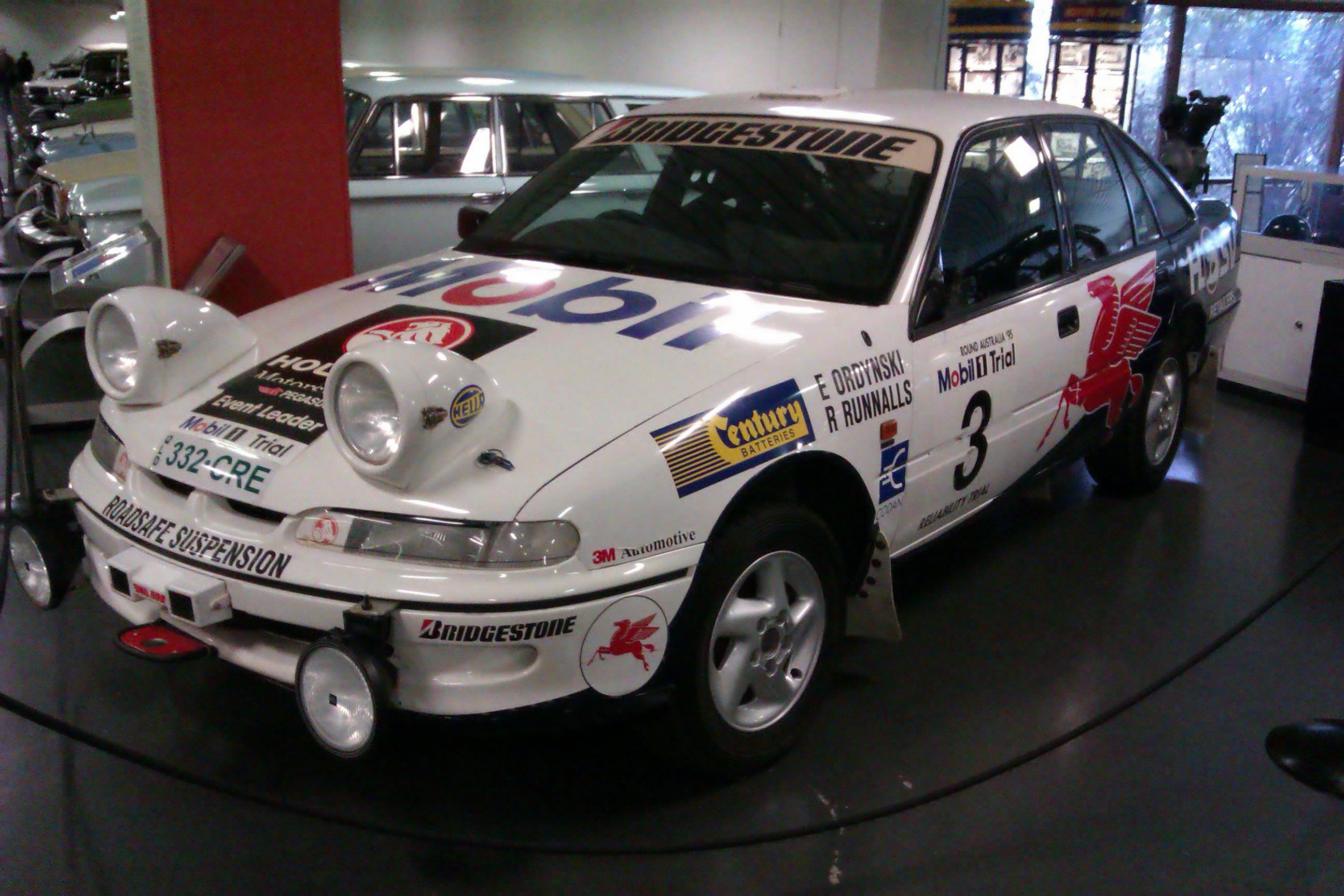
The Holden VR Commodore in which Ed Ordynski and Ross Runnalls won the 1995 Mobil 1 Trial

This major event had its origin in a series of car trials staged in New South Wales, sponsored by the (British) REDeX brand of oil additive, and organised by the Australian Sporting Car Club of Sydney. The contest was not a race, but points were lost through late arrival at checkpoints, through condition of the vehicle at the finish line, and other factors. The cars' bonnets and radiator caps were sealed, and breaking the seal caused so many points to be lost it was tantamount to disqualification.

The first Redex Trials, in 1952 and February 1953, passed without much public attention. The second of 1953, staged over 2 and 3 May, was newsworthy. Billed as a 1,000 mile event, the route was actually 1,134 miles (1,825 km), starting from Sydney, up through the Blue Mountains; through Mittagong and the back roads behind the Jenolan Caves to Harden then Cootamundra, Forbes, Orange, Coolah, Mudgee, and back down the mountains to Sydney. The usual hazards of the road and navigation through unfamiliar geography were multiplied by heavy rain — 11 inches (280 mm) fell in Sydney — and of 17 competitors only nine finished the course. A Ford Consul, driven by D. H. "Peter" Antill won, with a Ford Customline, driven by J. E. "Jack" Murray second and an Austin A40, driven by D. Cummins third.

The first Redex round-Australia reliability trial, of 6,500 miles (10,500 km), had a first prize of £1,000, and entry was not restricted to members of car clubs. The route was planned and test-driven by the ASSC secretary, Norman Pleasance. and passed through Brisbane, Rockhampton, Townsville, Darwin, Alice Springs, Adelaide, and Melbourne before returning to Sydney. Public interest was intense and every aspect of the trial was the subject of media interest.

On 30 August 1953, huge crowds gathered at the Sydney Showground (Moore Park) to watch as 192 cars left at three-minute intervals, and over the next week many hundreds of thousands took time to watch as the competitors made their way through the various towns along the route. A common criticism of the trial was the number of competitors who drove at dangerously high speeds to recover time lost in a stage. Another was the advantages enjoyed by sponsored teams: apart from the benefit of support crews along the way, because the route was published in detail a month prior, they were able to have a "practice run" around the course in the weeks before the event. Of the twenty top finalists, two thirds were sponsored.

The success of the round-Australia tour did not spell the end of the 24-hour, 1,000-mile Redex trials around New South Wales. The next was held in March 1954 and won by Jack Murray. Many entrants used this event as preparation for the coming big event:

The second Redex round-Australia reliability trial, of 9,600 miles (15,400 km), was held the following year, and had a first prize of £2,000. The route was truly "round (mainland) Australia", beginning in Sydney on 3 July 1954, passing through Brisbane, Rockhampton, Mackay, Townsville, Mount Isa, Darwin, Broome, Meekatharra, Madura, Adelaide and Melbourne, finishing at Moore Park on 20 July, 246 cars took part and 127 finished within the times allowed, though many doggedly completed the course in the following week. One forced to drop out was the celebrated radio personality Jack Davey. The winner was a 1948 Ford V-8, an ex-taxi dubbed the "Grey Ghost", driven by John Eric "Gelignite Jack" Murray (1907–1983) and navigated by the unrelated Bill Murray, losing no points on the trip. It was on this trial that Murray gained his nickname, from his occasional celebratory detonation of sticks of explosive, a custom that delighted some and infuriated others. "Secret" intermediate checkpoints were an innovation this year in an attempt to curb speeding.

In the 1955 Redex Trial, 276 cars left Sydney on 21 August and passed through checkpoints at Newcastle, Tamworth, Southport, Brisbane, Toowoomba, Maryborough, Rockhampton, Marlborough, Sarina, Townsville, Cairns, Hughenden, Duchess, Camooweal, Tennant Creek, Darwin, Katherine, Fitzroy Crossing, Port Hedland, Carnarvon, Perth, Northam, Kalgoorlie, Madura, Ceduna, Adelaide, Broken Hill, Mildura, Horsham, Mount Gambier, Melbourne, Whitfield, Corryong, Canberra, Goulburn and Wollongong, before terminating in Sydney on 11 September, a distance of 10,500 miles (16,900 km). More than half the field failed to complete the course, most being victims of the 379 miles (610 km) stretch from Cairns to Hughenden. The last leg was marred by a section near Murrumbateman where contestants were required to negotiate a boggy paddock, which led to Jack Murray, who fared badly and thought he was out of contention, not checking in for scrutiny at the finish line. A bad move, as following adverse criticism, results for that section were disregarded. Murray did not attend the Ball, at which the winners should have been announced but were not, due to the protests still pending. The two leading Volkswagen drivers had protested swingeing penalties for non-structural cracks, and when their protests were upheld the provisional winner protested, vehemently criticising the Australian Sporting Car Club. From 1956 onward Redex did not sponsor the Round Australia Trial, with Ampol initially taking over the event.

=== In popular culture ===
- The 1977 film Newsfront, a drama about a fictional Australian newsreel company similar to Cinesound Review, featured footage from the 1954 Redex Trial.

== List of winners ==
Year	Name of trial	Start	Finish	Distance	No.	Entrant	Driver	Co-driver(s)	Car	Points/Time Lost Overall Time (1995 and 1998)
1953	Redex Trial	Sydney		6,500 miles (10,460 km)	48	K.Tubman and J.Marshall	Ken Tubman	John Marshall	Peugeot 203	19 points
1954	Redex Trial	Sydney		9,600 miles (15,450 km)	256	J.Murray	Jack Murray	Bill Murray	Ford 1948 Deluxe V8	0 points
1955	Redex Trial	Sydney		10,500 miles (16,900 km)	90	Regent Motors	Laurie Whitehead	Bob Foreman	Volkswagen 1200	21 points
1956	Ampol Trial	Sydney		6,500 miles (10,460 km)	32	W.Murrell & A.Taylor	Wilfred Murrell	Allan Taylor	Peugeot 403	258 points
1956	Mobilgas Trial	Sydney		8,500 miles (13,680 km)	16	E. and L. Perkins	Eddie Perkins	Lance Perkins	Volkswagen 1200	48 points
1957	Ampol Trial	Sydney		6,000 miles (9,660 km)	26	J.Witter	Jack Witter	Doug Stewart	Volkswagen 1200	3 points
1957	Mobilgas Trial	Melbourne		9,000 miles (14,480 km)	76	L. Whitehead	Laurie Whitehead	Kevin Young	Volkswagen 1200	13 points
1958	Ampol Trial	Sydney		7,500 miles (12,070 km)	158	A.C. McGrath & Co.	Don Garard	Jim Roberts	Holden FE	9 points
1958	Mobilgas Trial	Sydney	Melbourne	10,100 miles (16,250 km)	2	E.Perkins	Eddie Perkins	Arthur Smith	Volkswagen 1200	11 points
1964	Ampol Trial	Sydney		7,000 miles (11,260 km)	50	Ford Motor Co. of Australia	Harry Firth	Graham Hoinville	Ford Cortina GT	21 points
1970	Ampol Trial	Alice Springs	Sydney	6,340 miles (10,200 km)	11	Citroën Cars	Jean-Claude Ogier	Lucette Ogier	Citroën DS21	60 points
1970	Ampol Trial	Alice Springs	Sydney	6,340 miles (10,200 km)	23	Datsun Racing Team	Edgar Herrmann	Hans Schuller	Datsun 1600 SSS	60 points
1979	Repco Reliability Trial	Melbourne		19,000 km	05	Holden Dealer Team	Peter Brock	Matt Philip; Noel Richards	Holden VB Commodore	3hr 39min 18sec
1995	Mobil 1 Trial	Brisbane	Gold Coast	19,000 km	3	Mobil Bridgestone Rally Team	Ed Ordynski	Ross Runnalls	Holden VR Commodore	23hr 29min 12sec
1998	PlayStation Rally Round Australia	Adelaide		18,500 km	3	Bruce Garland Motorsport	Bruce Garland	Harry Suzuki	Holden Jackaroo	34hr 27min 19sec
