= 1958 Round Australia Trial (Mobilgas) =

1958 Round Australia Trial Mobilgas Trial
← Previous event	Next event →
- Host country: Australia
- Rally base: Sydney; Melbourne
- Dates run: 20 August – 7 September 1958
- Stages: 31
- Stage surface: Tarmac and Gravel
- Overall distance: 16,250 km (10,100 miles)

Statistics
- Crews: 67 at start, 34 at finish

Overall results
- Overall winner: (Australia) Eddie Perkins (Australia) Arthur Smith

The 1958 Round Australia Trial, officially the Mobilgas Trial was the ninth running of the Round Australia Trial. The rally took place between 20 August and 7 September 1958. The event covered 16,250 kilometres around Australia. It was won by Eddie Perkins and Arthur Smith, driving a Volkswagen 1200.

== Results ==
Pos	No	Entrant	Drivers	Car	Penalties (Points)
1	2	(Australia) E.B. Perkins	(Australia) Eddie Perkins (Australia) Arthur Smith	Volkswagen 1200	11
2	48	(Australia) Greg Cusack	(Australia) Greg Cusack (Australia) Pat Lawless	Volkswagen 1200	55
3	23	(Australia) G.J. Coles and Company	(Australia) Dave Anderson (Australia) Laurie McAlister	Holden FE	58
4	68	(Australia) S.G. McGlashan	(Australia) Stan McGlashan (Australia) W. Leabeater	Volkswagen 1200	68
5	53	(Australia) H.R. Smith	(Australia) Harry Smith (Australia) David Orr	Volkswagen 1200	117
6	8	(Australia) L.L. Fiebig	(Australia) Lance Fiebig (Australia) Jim Claridge	Holden FE	125
7	72	(Australia) Regal Motors	(Australia) Malcolm Brooks (Australia) Frank Tate	Standard Vanguard Phase III	154
8	21	(Australia) Team Firth and Young	(Australia) Harry Firth (Australia) Kevin Young	Volkswagen 1200	155
9	31	(Australia) Leith Car Sales	(Australia) Harvey Gunn (Australia) Desmond Smith	Volkswagen 1200	158
10	3	(Australia) Team Murray and Murison	(Australia) Bill Murray (Australia) Bill Murison	Chrysler Royal V8 AP1	194
11	25	(Australia) Team James, Williams and Calnan	(Australia) Clarrie James (Australia) Jack Williams (Australia) Albert Calnan	Holden FE	394
12	71	(Czech Republic) Motokov	(Australia) Ken Tubman (Australia) David Berman	Škoda 440	429
13	69	(Australia) Nalder's Garage	(Australia) Wes Nalder (Australia) Jack Nalder	Ford Zephyr Mark II	480
14	63	(Australia) Elaine Lenaghan	(Australia) Elaine Lenaghan (Australia) Len Lenaghan (Australia) Reg Lenaghan	Holden FE	520
15	41	(Australia) J.N. Mather	(Australia) Joseph Mather (Australia) Ron Jones (Australia) H. McKinnon	Volkswagen 1200	658
16	57	(Australia) Parkers' Colac	(Australia) Arthur Parker (Australia) W. Stacey (Australia) John Parker	Holden FC	695
17	29	(Australia) Lorna and Keith Gamble	(Australia) Keith Gamble (Australia) Lorna Gamble (Australia) John Hayward	Rover 90	786
18	59	(Australia) R.J Holden	(Australia) Bob Holden (Australia) Matt Walton	Peugeot 403	794
19	62	(Australia) O.G. Roberts	(Australia) Tom Quill (Australia) Sidney Chapman (Australia) Owen Roberts	Holden FC	820
20	42	(Australia) C.R. Turner Motors	(Australia) Claude Turner (Australia) Laurie Turner	Hillman Minx Mark II	904
21	58	(Australia) John and Peter Perkins	(Australia) John Perkins (Australia) Peter Perkins	Peugeot 403	911
22	49	(Australia) Team Cullen and Garard	(Australia) Pat Cullen (Australia) John Garard	Holden FE	939
23	60	(Australia) Wally Eremin	(Australia) Wally Eremin (Australia) J. Alexander	Hillman Minx Mark II	1,012
24	37	(Czech Republic) Motokov	(Australia) Vince Brown (Australia) Norm Saville	Škoda 440	1,018
25	19	(Japan) Nissan Motor Company	(Japan) Yasuhara Nanba (Australia) Bruce Wilkinson (Japan) Kazuaki Okuyama	Datsun 1000	1,129
26	22	(Australia) C.G. Chappell	(Australia) Chester Chappell (Australia) Rob Mills	Holden FE	1,157
27	65	(Australia) H.E. and F.N. Pitts Motors	(Australia) Frank Pitts (Australia) Kevin Higgs	Hillman Minx Mark II	1,183
28	55	(Australia) Victorian Police Motor Sports Club	(Australia) Alan Sharpley (Australia) Kevin O'Neill (Australia) Jerry Merrett	Ford Zephyr Mark II	1,227
29	5	(Australia) Aubrey Melrose	(Australia) Aubrey Melrose (Australia) John Cummins	Austin Westminster A90	1,255
30	54	(Australia) Jack Murray	(Australia) Jack 'Milko' Murray (Australia) John Pomroy (Australia) Bert Madden	Chrysler Royal V8 AP1	1,295
31	44	(Czech Republic) Motokov	(Australia) Major Warwick (Australia) Max Watson	Škoda 440	1,486
32	36	(Australia) Team Hose and Hillman	(Australia) David Hose (Australia) John Hillman	Morris Minor 1000	1,545
33	27	(Australia) Leslie Young	(Australia) Leslie Young (Australia) Harry Harris	Morris Minor 1000	1,780
34	14	(Japan) Nissan Motor Company	(Japan) Yoshitane Oya (Australia) Allan Gibbons (Japan) Yonekichi Minawa	Datsun 1000	2,003
