= Holden FJ =

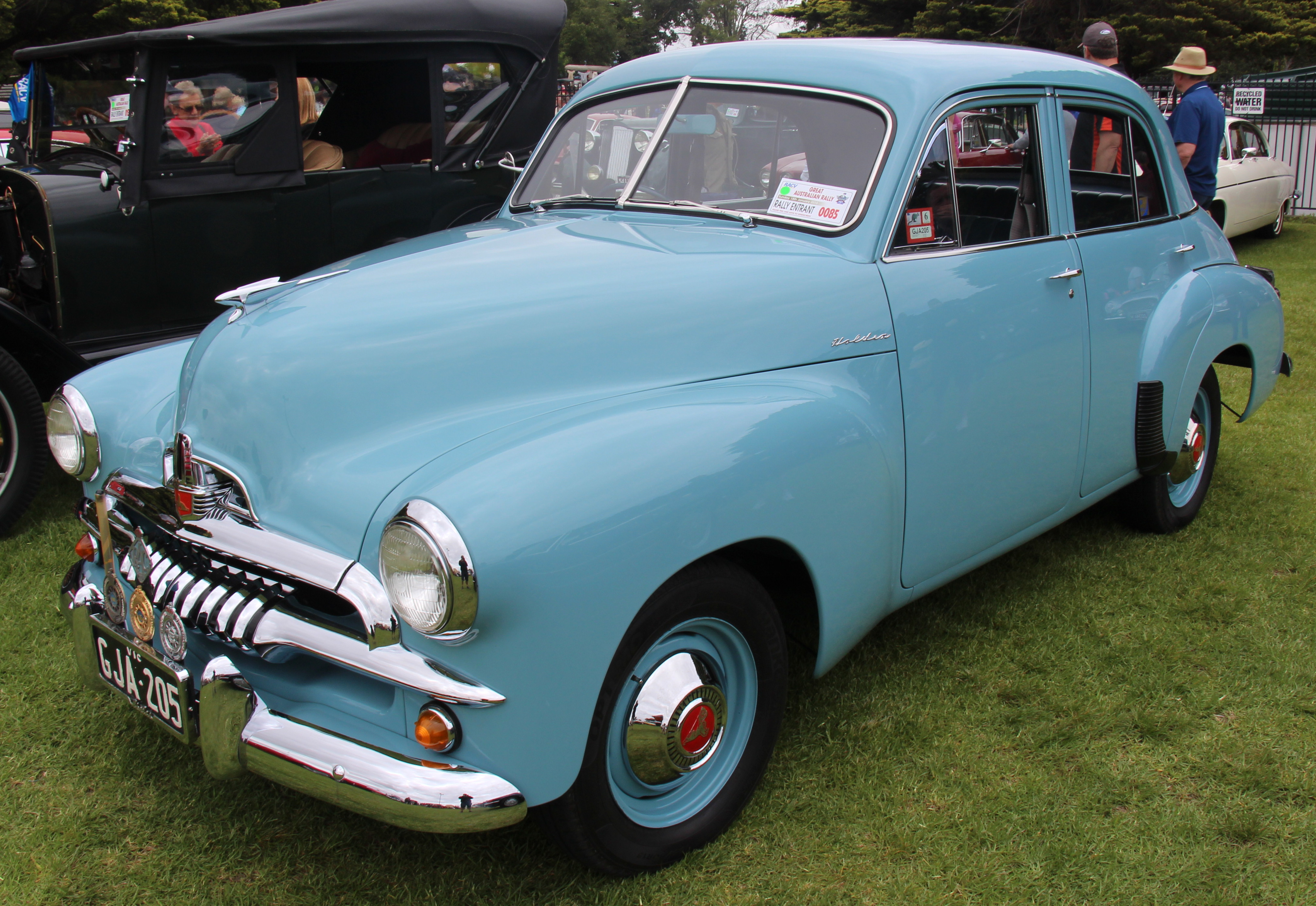
- Holden Special sedan

Overview
- Manufacturer: Holden (General Motors)
- Production: October 1953–June 1956
- Assembly: Adelaide, Sydney, Melbourne, Brisbane, and Perth, Australia
- Designer: Alf Payze, Frank Mathwin

Body and chassis
- Class: Mid-size
- Body style: 4-door sedan 2-door coupe utility 2-door panel van
- Layout: Front-engine, rear-wheel-drive

Powertrain
- Engine: 2.2 L (132.5 cu in) Grey I6
- Transmission: 3-speed manual

Dimensions
- Wheelbase: 2,620 mm (103 in)
- Length: 4,401 mm (173.3 in)
- Width: 1,702 mm (67.0 in)
- Height: 1,581 mm (62.2 in)
- Kerb weight: 2,250 lb (1,021 kg)

Chronology
- Predecessor: Holden 48-215 & 50-2106
- Successor: Holden FE

The Holden FJ series is a range of motor vehicles which was produced in Australia by Holden from 1953 until 1956. The FJ was the second model of an "all Australian car" manufactured by Holden and was based upon the established 48-215 series, commonly referred to as the "FX".

== Overview ==
The FJ, of monocoque construction, broadly followed the silhouette of its predecessor, but featured a bolder horizontal styled front grille, along with comfort and decoration upgrades in a new sedan model named the 'Holden Special'. Originally specified as 60 bhp (45 kW) achieved at 3,800 rpm, the claimed maximum power output from the six-cylinder engine was increased to 65 bhp (48 kW) achieved at 4,000 rpm.

The sedan, in Standard, Business and Special trim levels, and a coupe utility were announced in October 1953 and were followed by a panel van derivative in December of that year. A wagon prototype was built but the bodystyle was not put into production. In 1954, Holden's first exports began with sales of the FJ in New Zealand.

In 1955, the car underwent a mild interior facelift for the Holden Special sedan, along with a variation in paint and trim options. The FJ series was progressively replaced by models from the Holden FE series from July 1956 to May 1957 with a total of 169,969 examples produced.

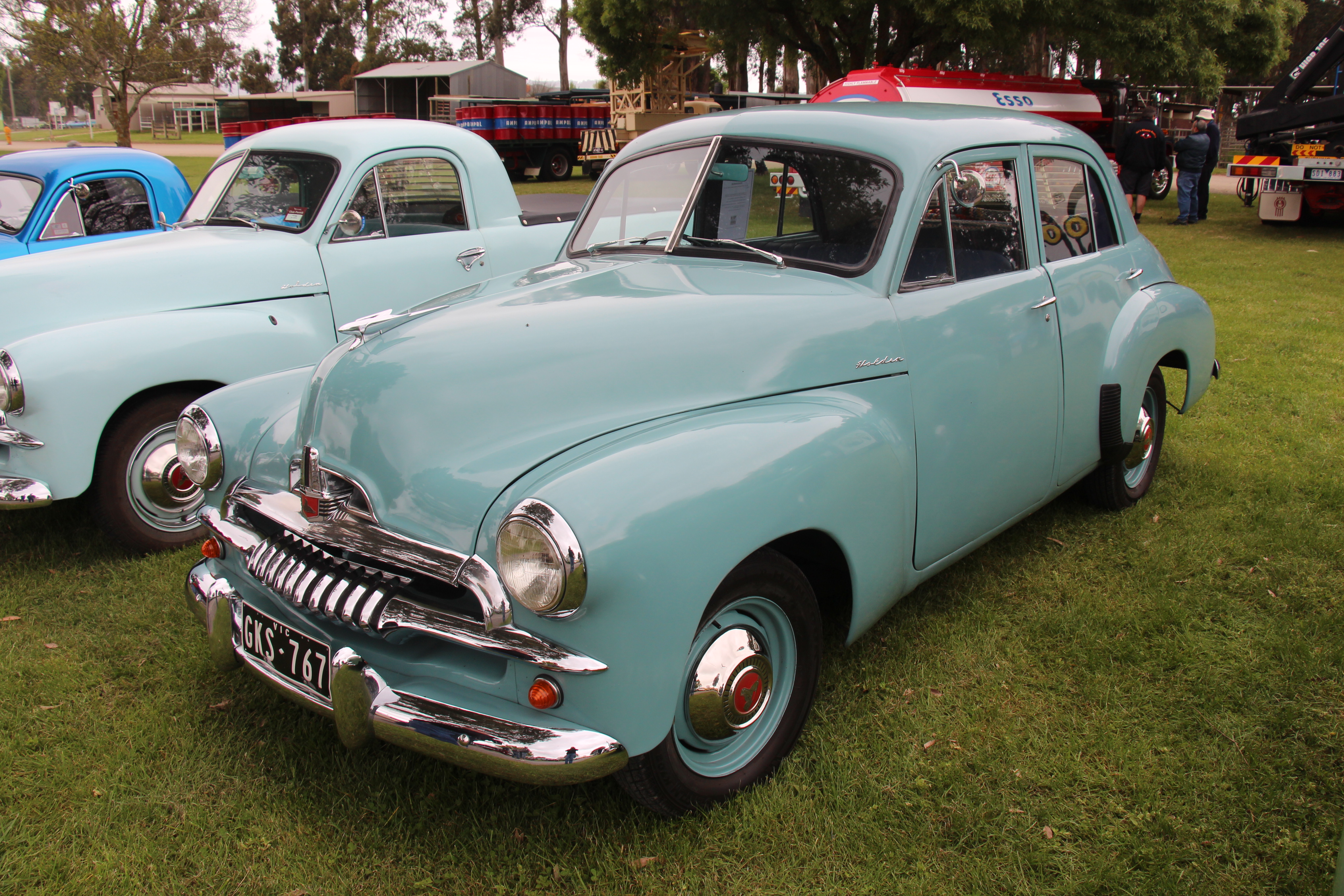
Holden Standard sedan

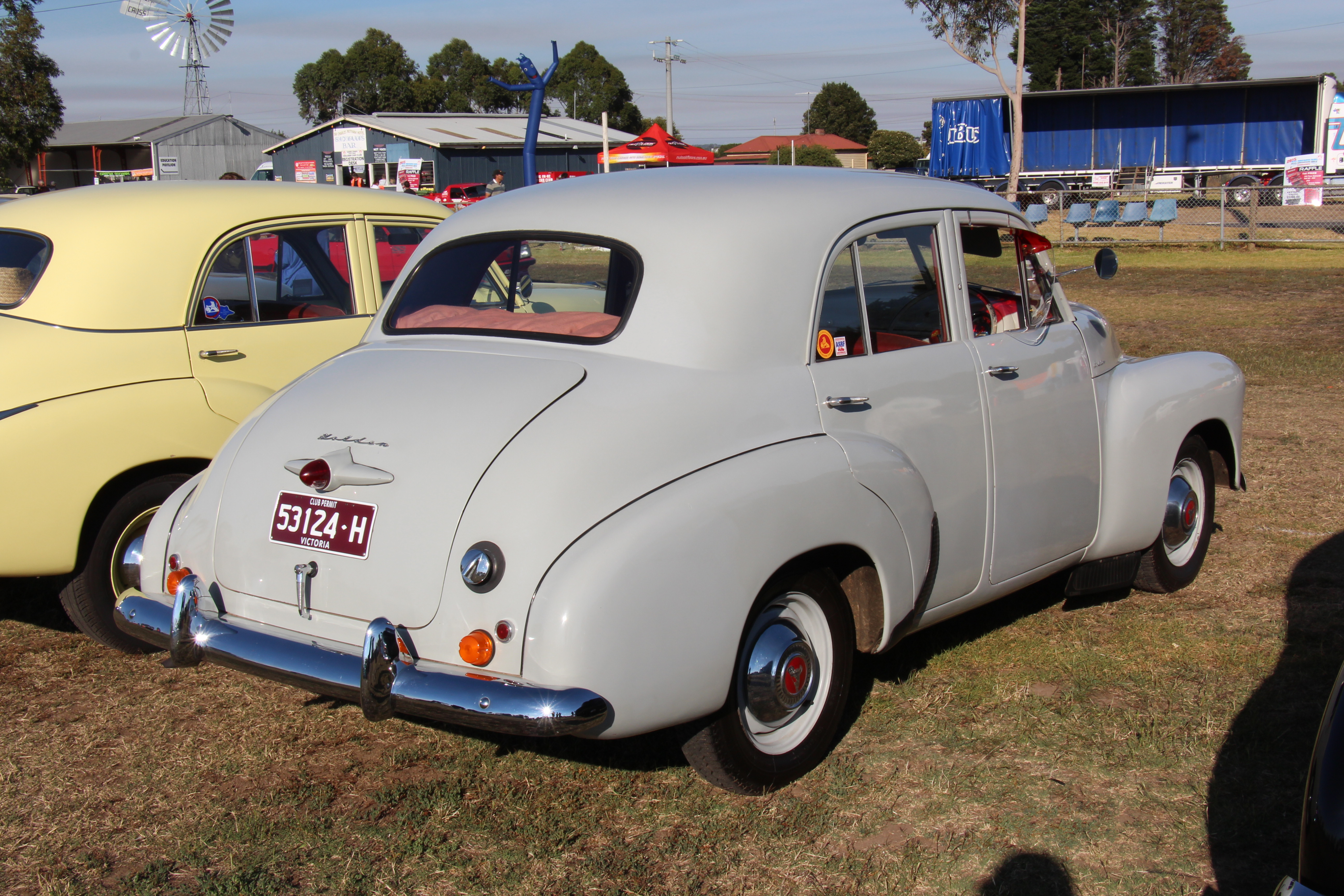
Holden Standard sedan

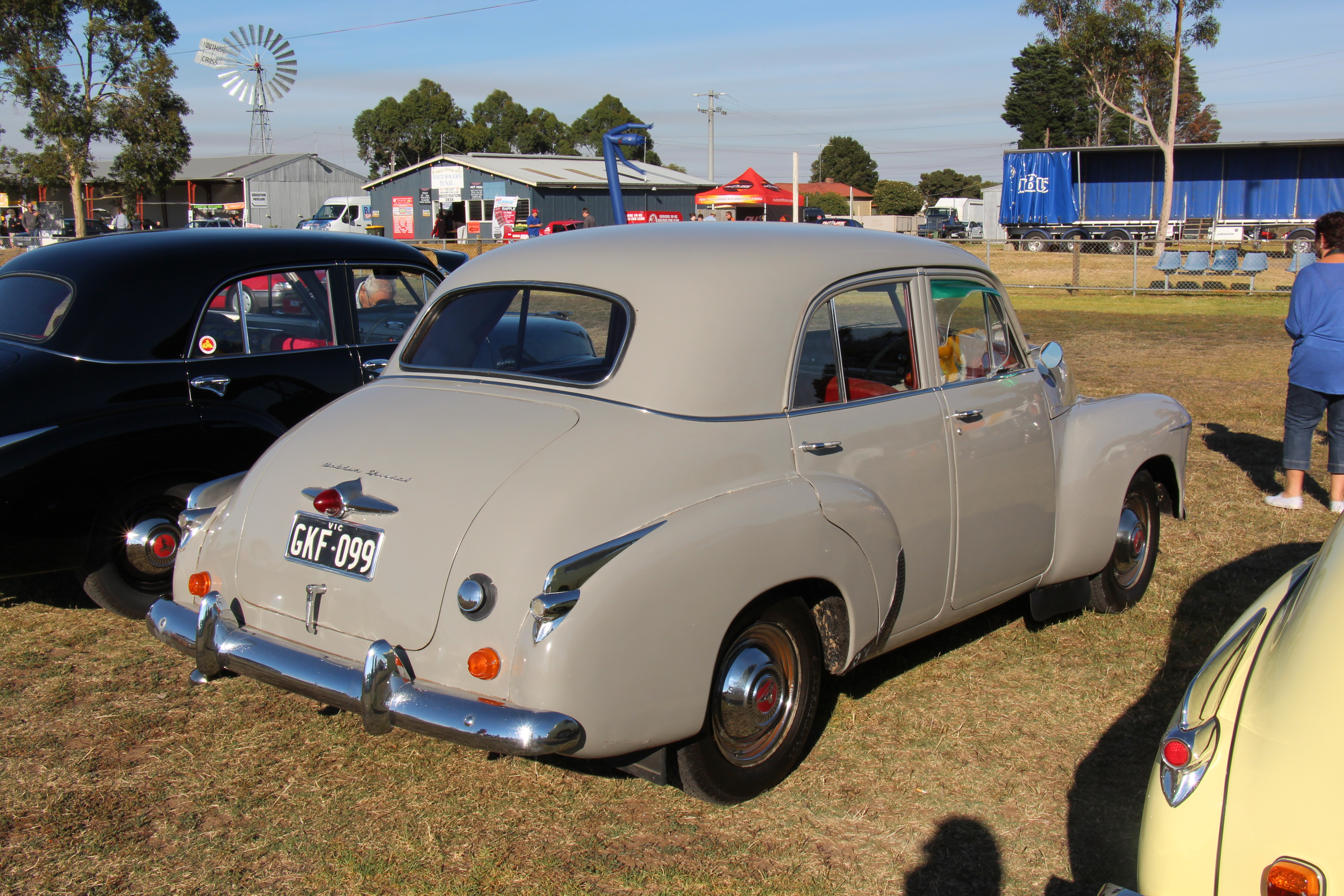
Holden Special Sedan

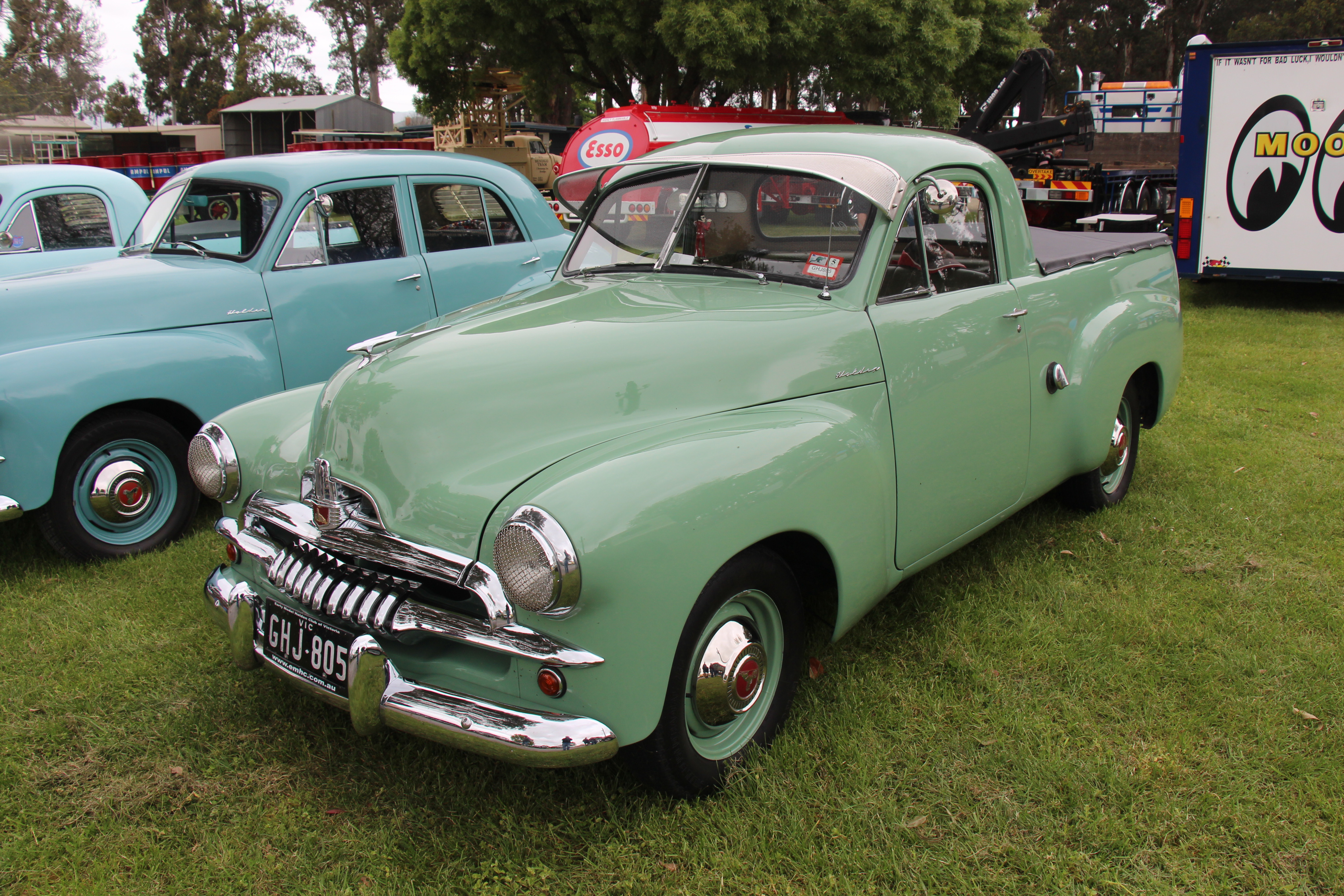
Holden coupe utility

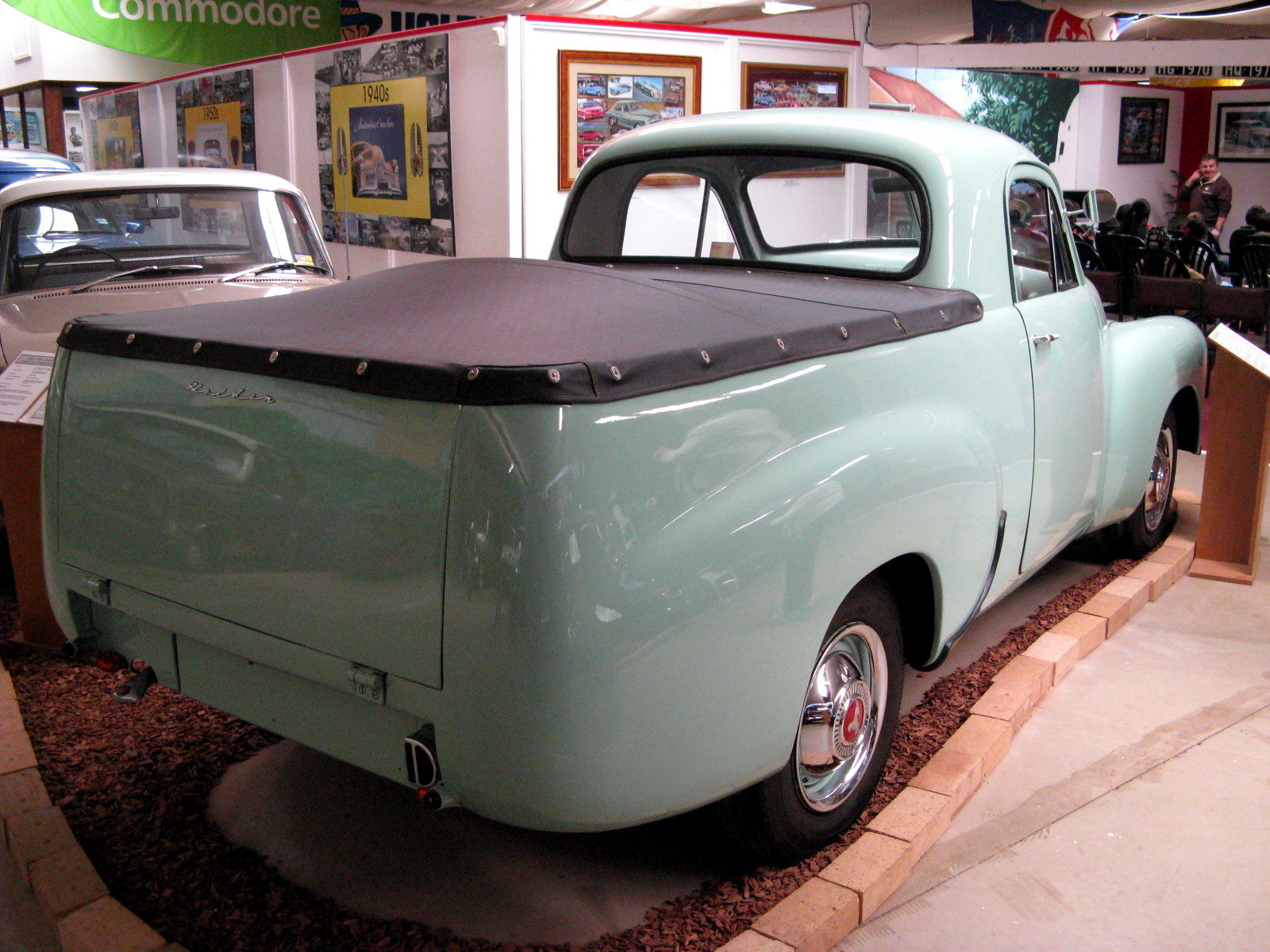
Holden coupe utility

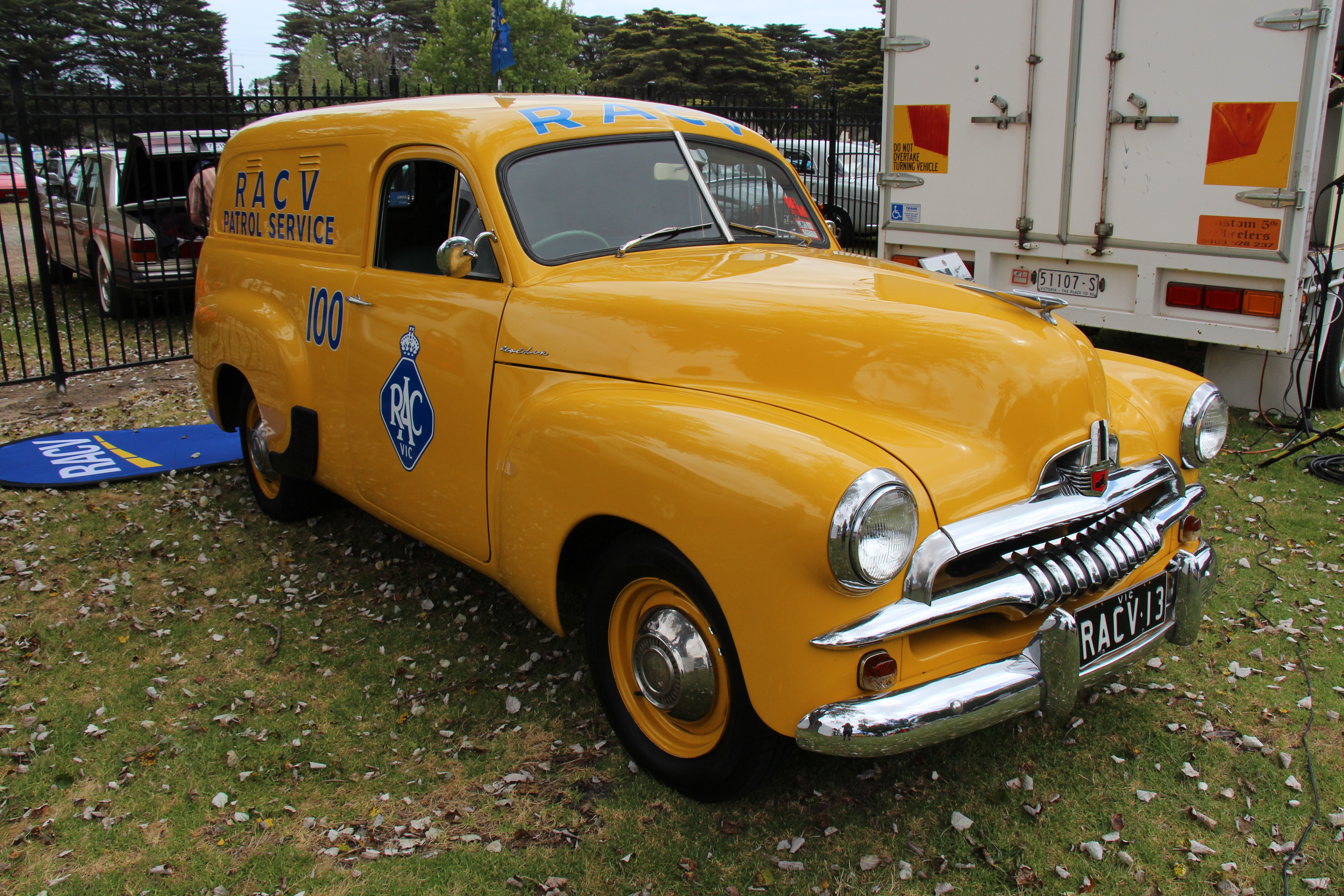
Holden panel van

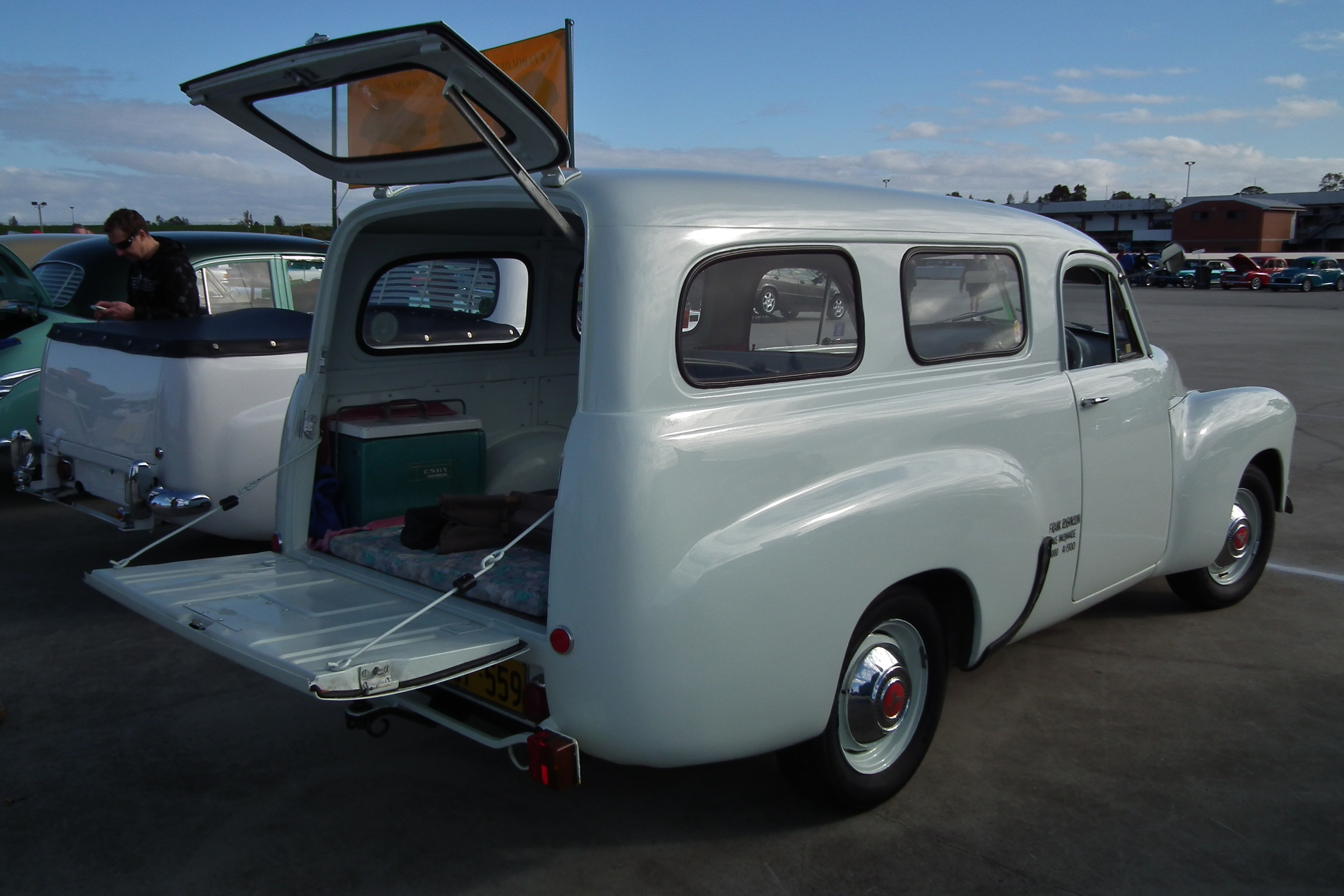
Holden panel van

== Legacy ==
There are nearly 20 specific FX-FJ Holden Car Clubs of Australia with members committed to preserving them. These clubs organise a national gathering for FX-FJ Holden enthusiasts every second year.

=== Efijy concept car ===
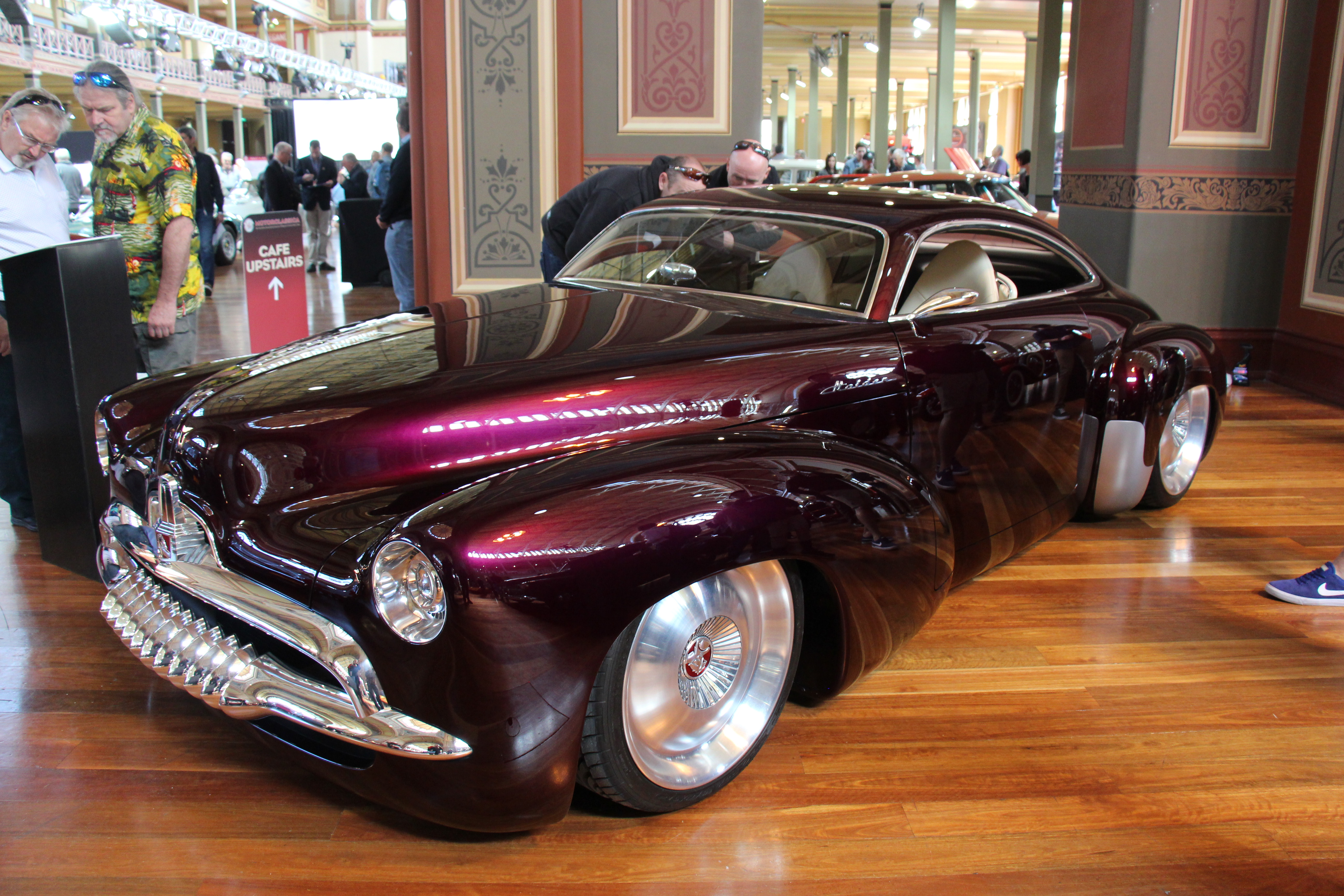
2005 Holden Efijy concept car

The Holden Efijy concept car, which debuted in 2005 at the Australian International Motor Show, paid tribute to the design of the original 1953 Holden FJ.
