= Holden FE =

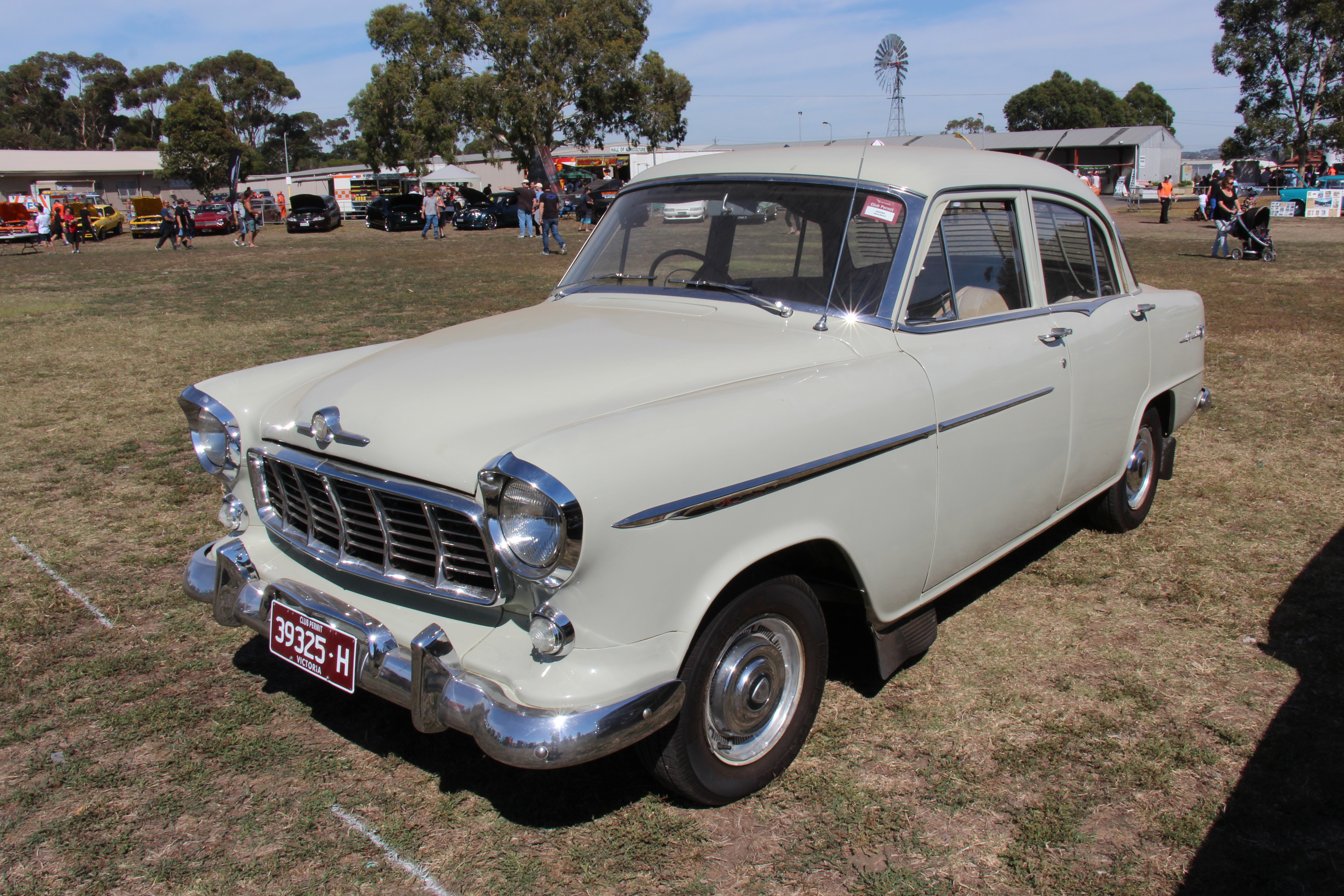
- Holden Special Sedan

Overview
- Manufacturer: Holden (General Motors)
- Also called: Holden Standard; Holden Business Sedan; Holden Special; Holden Utility; Holden Panel Van
- Production: July 1956 – April 1958
- Designer: Alf Payze

Body and chassis
- Class: Mid-size
- Body style: 4-door sedan 5-door station wagon 2-door coupé utility 2-door panel van
- Layout: FR layout

Powertrain
- Engine: 2.2L GMH '132' I6
- Transmission: 3-speed manual

Dimensions
- Wheelbase: 105.0 inches (2667mm)
- Length: 176.0 inches (4470mm)
- Width: 67.0 inches (1702mm)
- Height: 61.0 inches (1549mm)
- Kerb weight: 2380lb (1080kg)

Chronology
- Predecessor: Holden FJ
- Successor: Holden FC

The Holden FE is an automobile produced by Holden in Australia from 1956 until 1958. It was also the first Holden to be assembled in New Zealand, where General Motors New Zealand built their first example on 31 January 1957.

== Overview ==
The FE models were built on a longer wheelbase than the FJ series Holdens which they replaced, and they featured totally different styling, the FJ models having used a body shape carried over from the original Holden 48-215 series introduced in 1948. A single piece windscreen was now fitted and other improvements included a 12-volt electrical system (replacing the previous 6-volt system), improved steering, a front stabiliser bar and wider wheel rims. All models used a 2262 cc in-line six cylinder engine, coupled with a 3-speed manual gearbox. Engine improvements over the FJ included the use of bigger valves and an increased compression ratio of 6.8:1, which increased the power output from 45 kW (60 hp) to 53 kW (71 hp).

== Model range ==
The seven Holden FE models series were marketed as follows:

- Holden Standard Sedan
- Holden Standard Station Sedan
- Holden Business Sedan
- Holden Special Sedan
- Holden Special Station Sedan
- Holden Utility
- Holden Panel Van

When introduced in July 1956, the FE range consisted of the Holden Standard Sedan, Holden Business Sedan and Holden Special Sedan, the names designating different levels of equipment and interior trim. The existing FJ series Holden Utility and Holden Panel Van models continued alongside the new sedans, with the FE Utility replacing its FJ counterpart in February 1957. Two station wagon models, the Holden Standard Station Sedan and the Holden Special Station Sedan were released in March 1957, marking the first time that Holden had included a wagon in its range since the marque was introduced in 1948. The FE Panel Van replaced its FJ predecessor in May 1957, bringing the FE range up to its full complement of seven models.

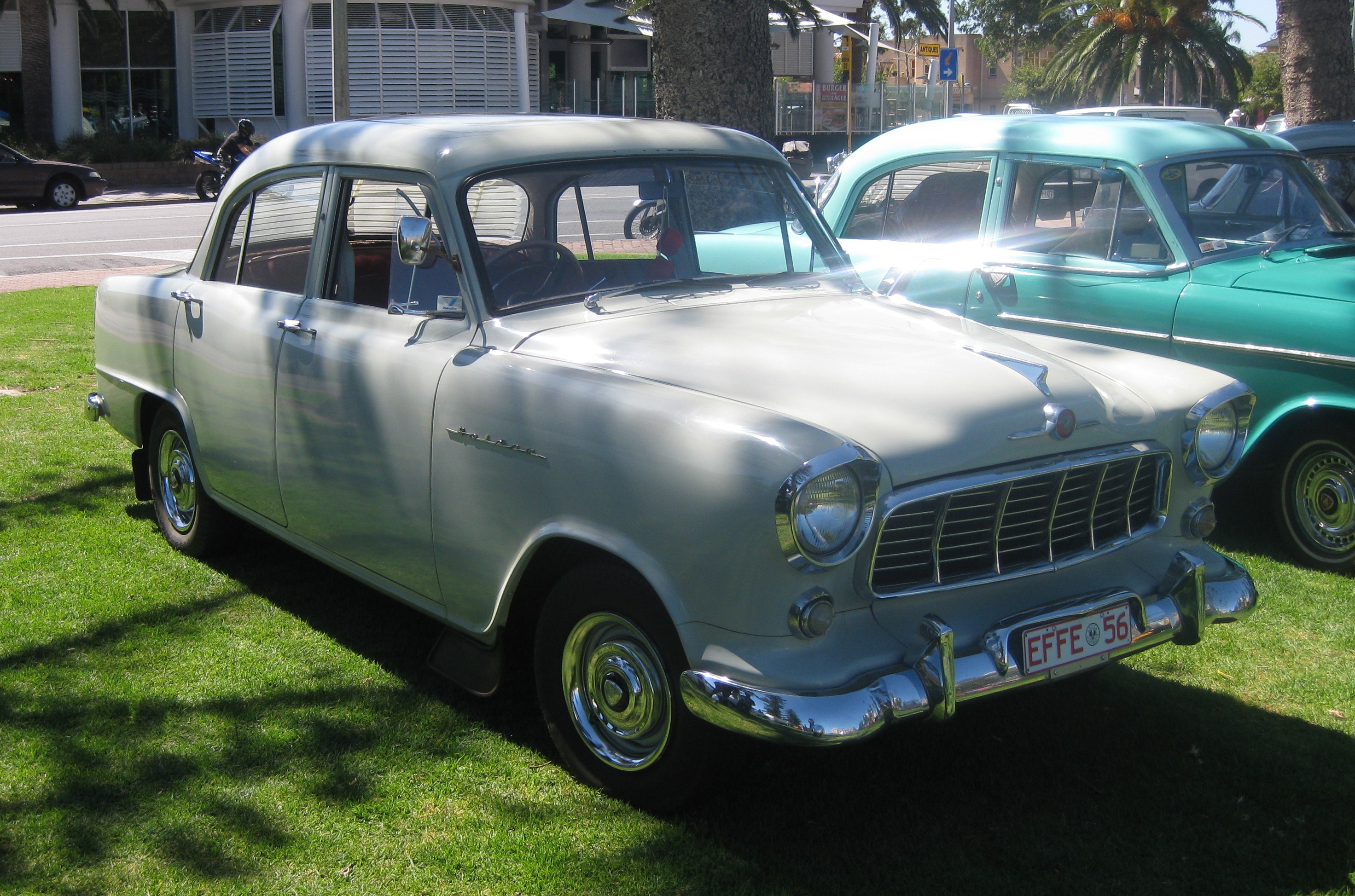
Holden Standard Sedan

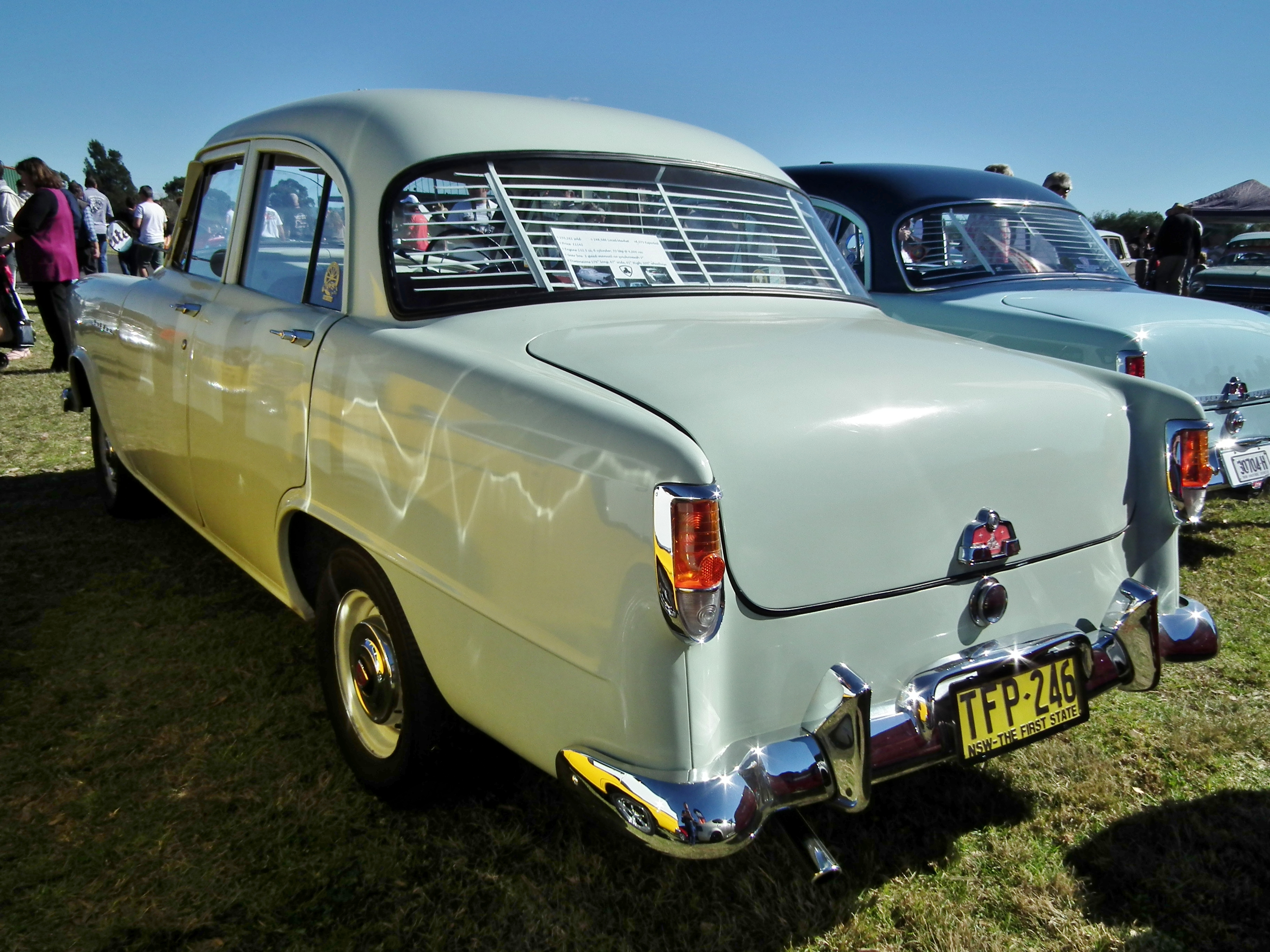
Holden Standard Sedan

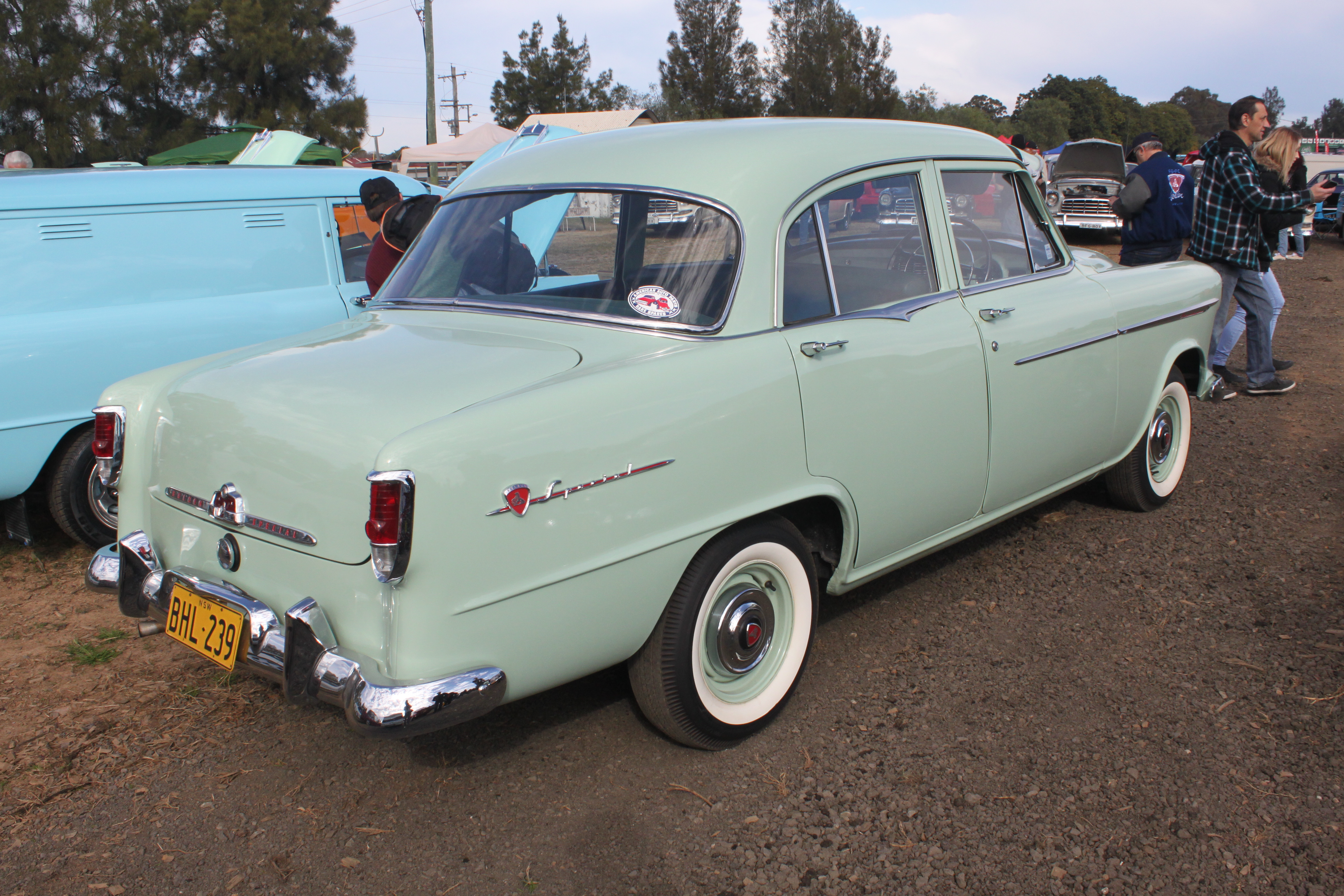
Holden Special Sedan

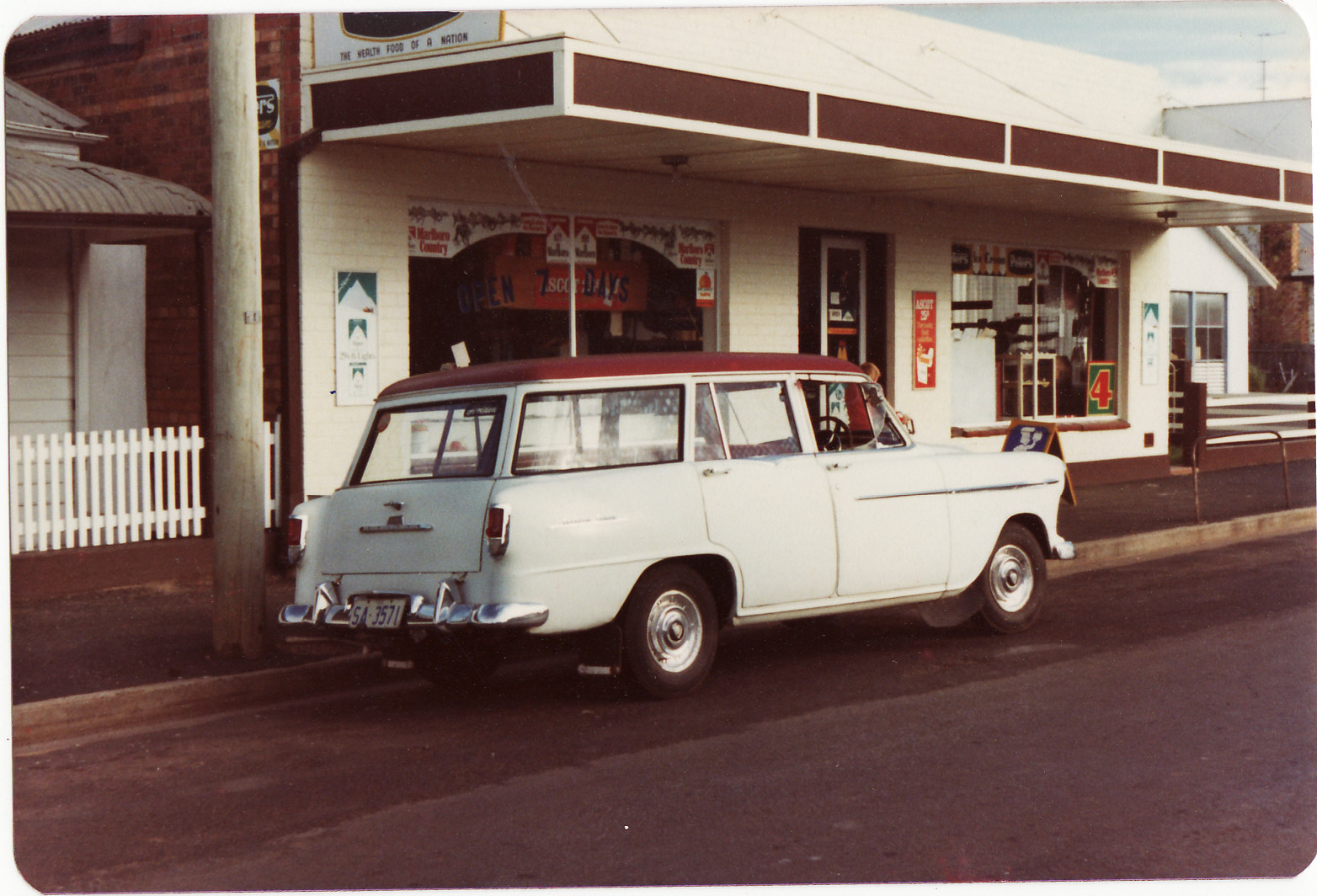
Holden Special Station Sedan

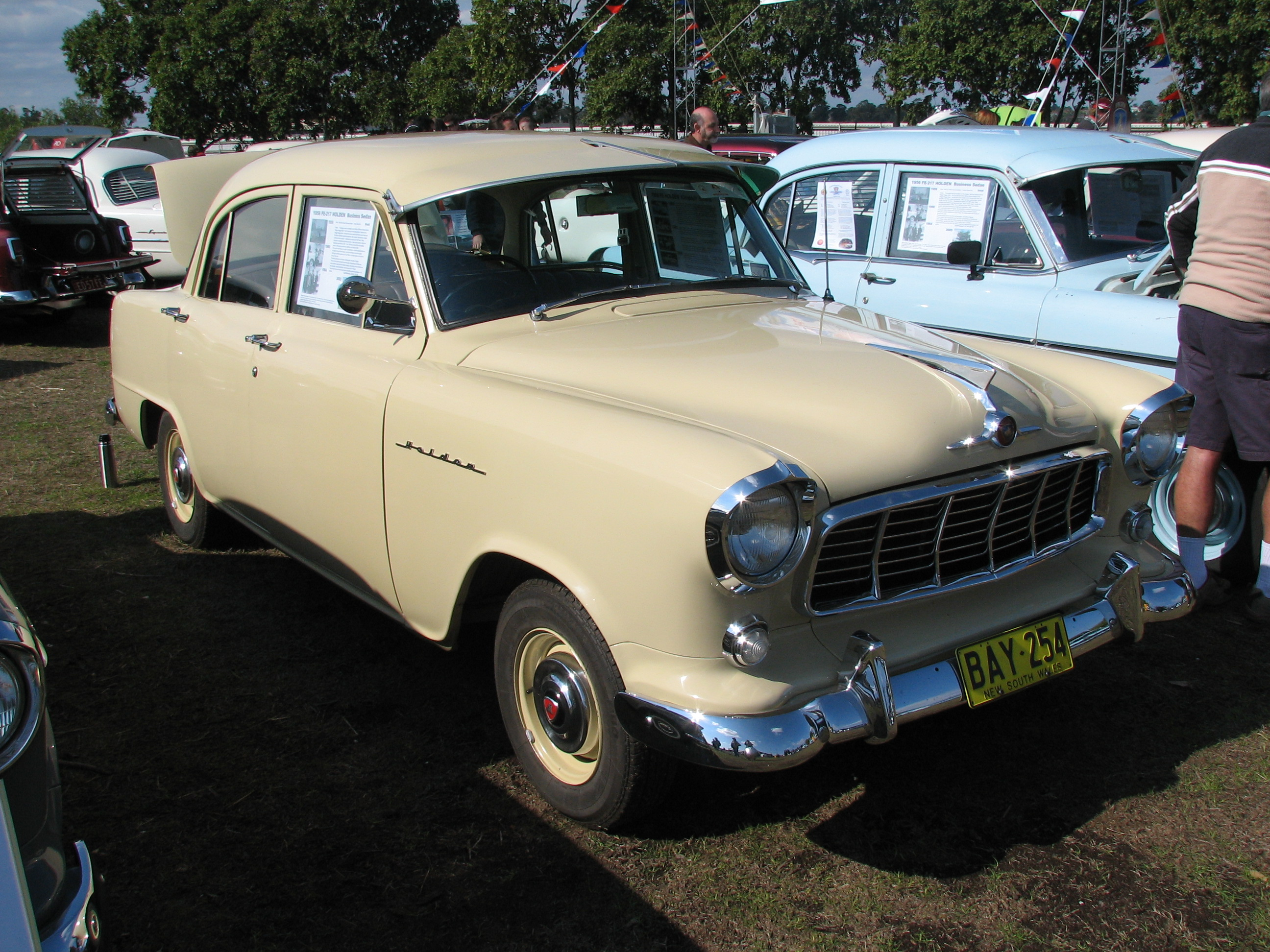
Holden Business Sedan

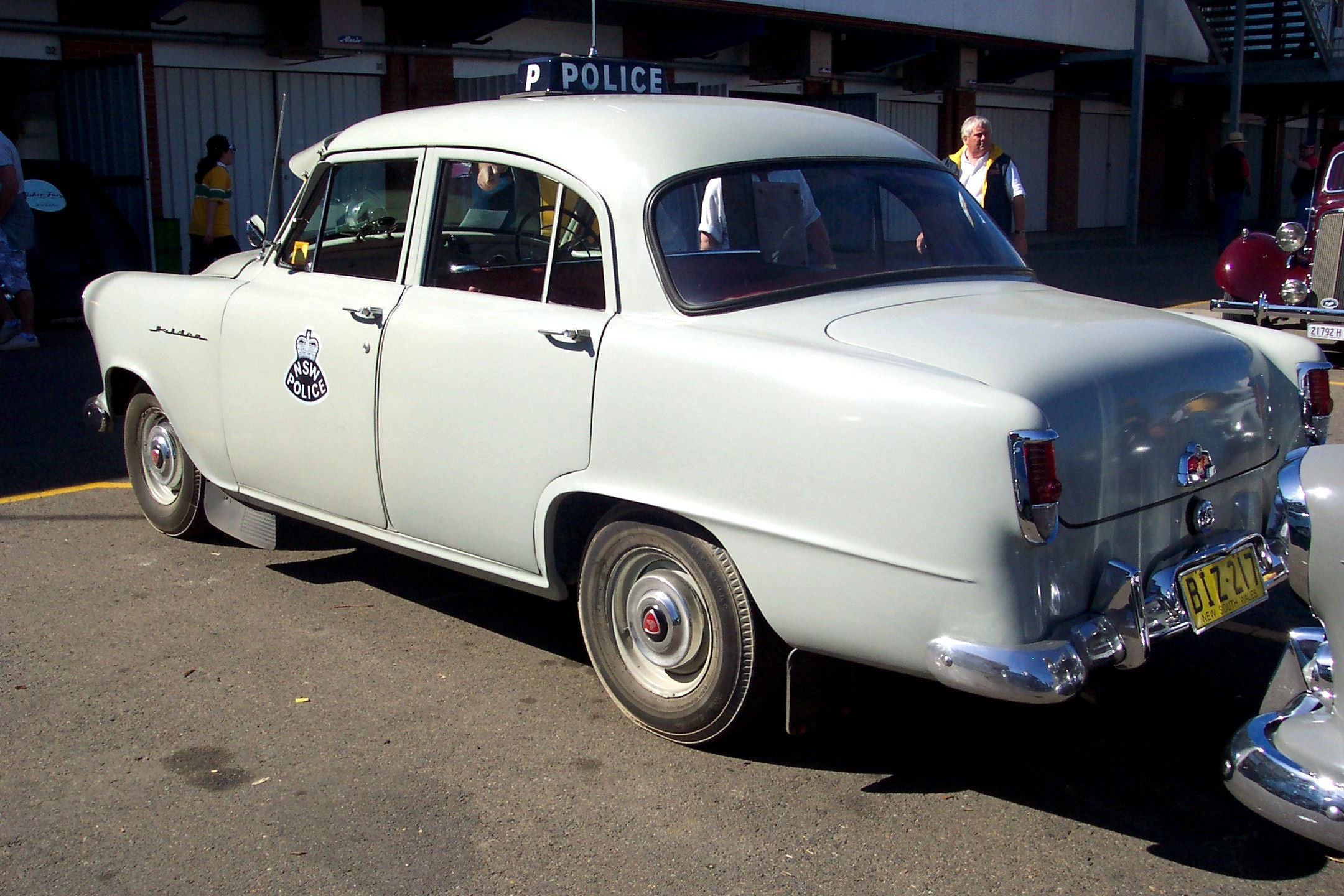
Holden Business Sedan

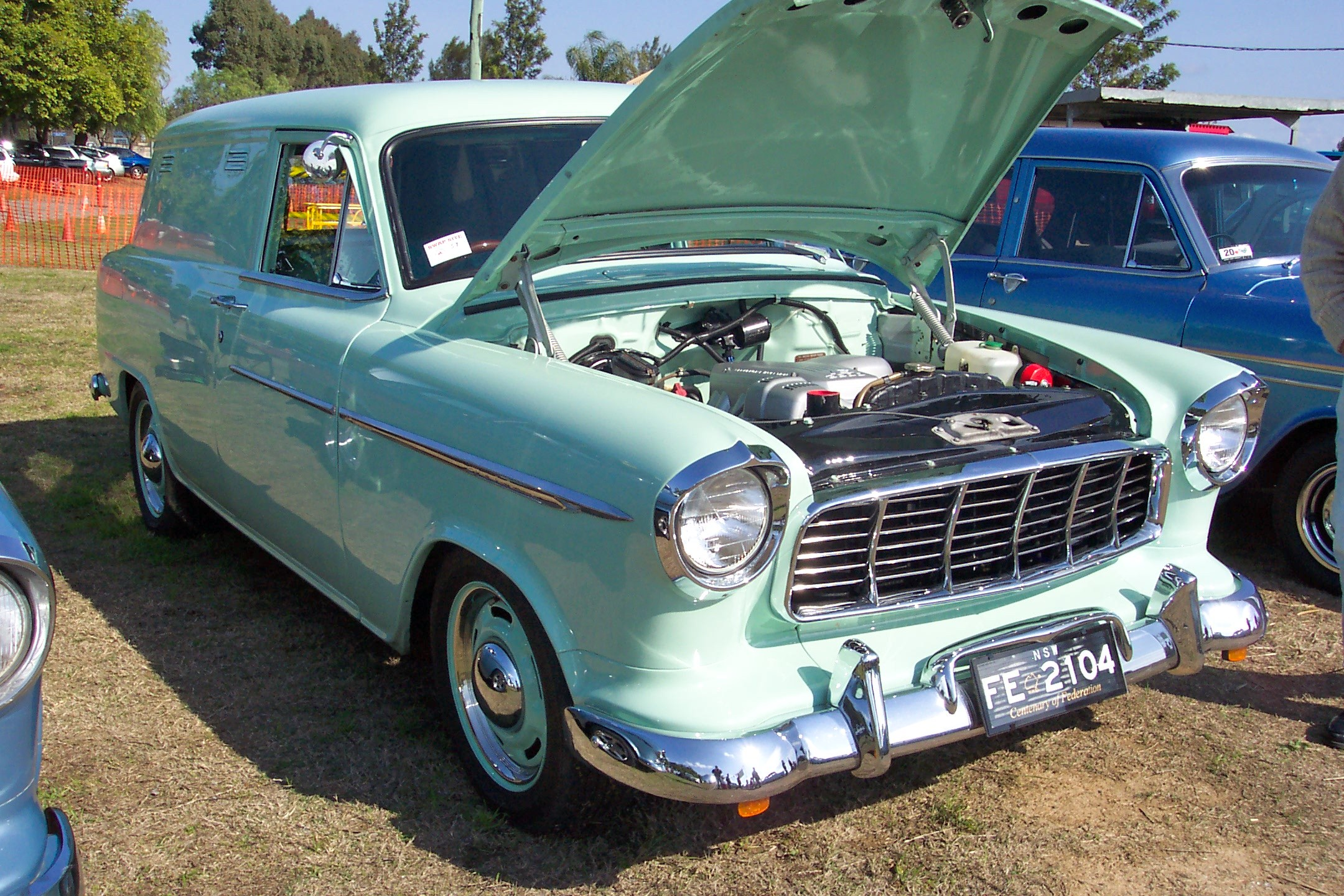
Holden Panel Van (with non-standard wheels)

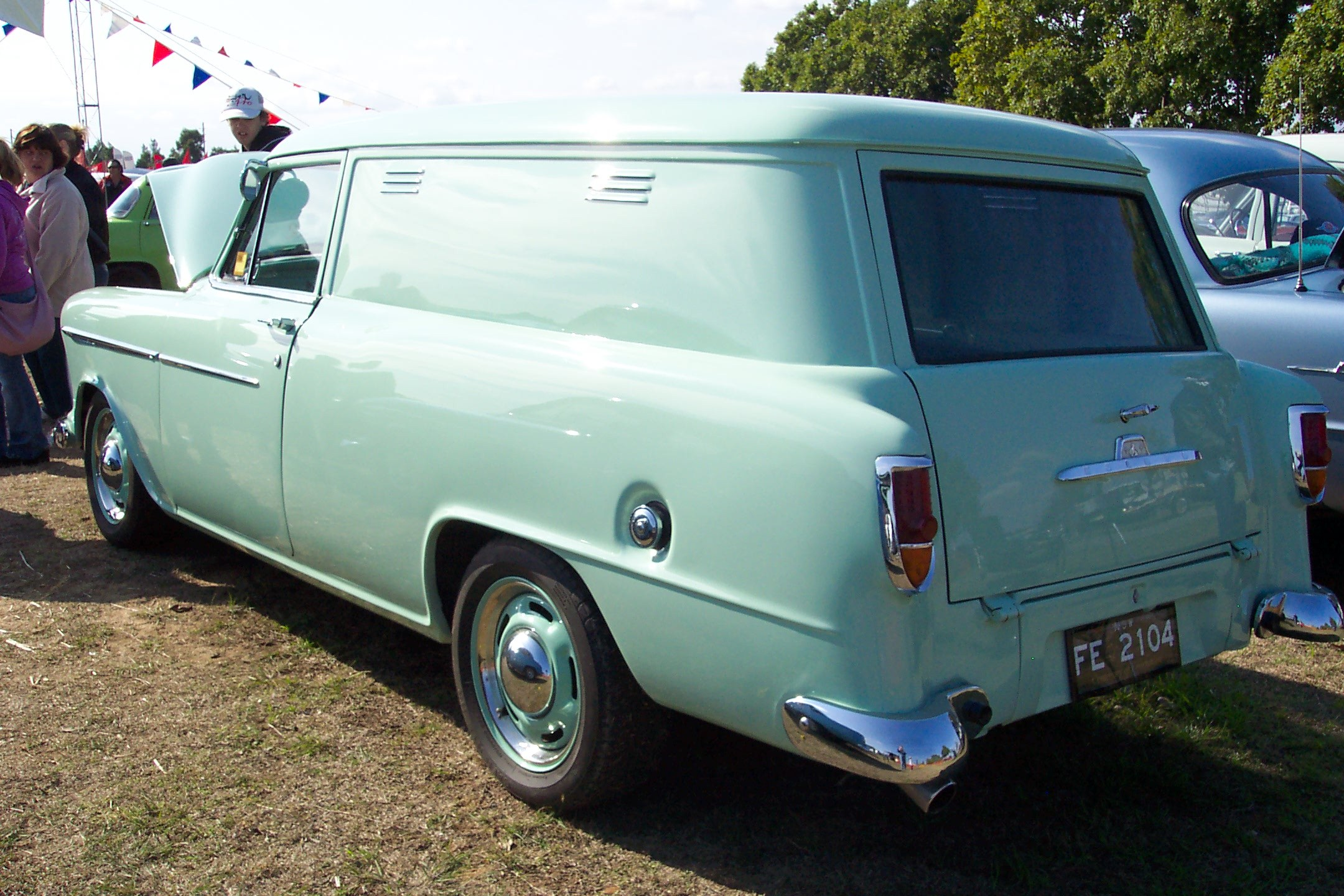
Holden Panel Van (with non-standard wheels)

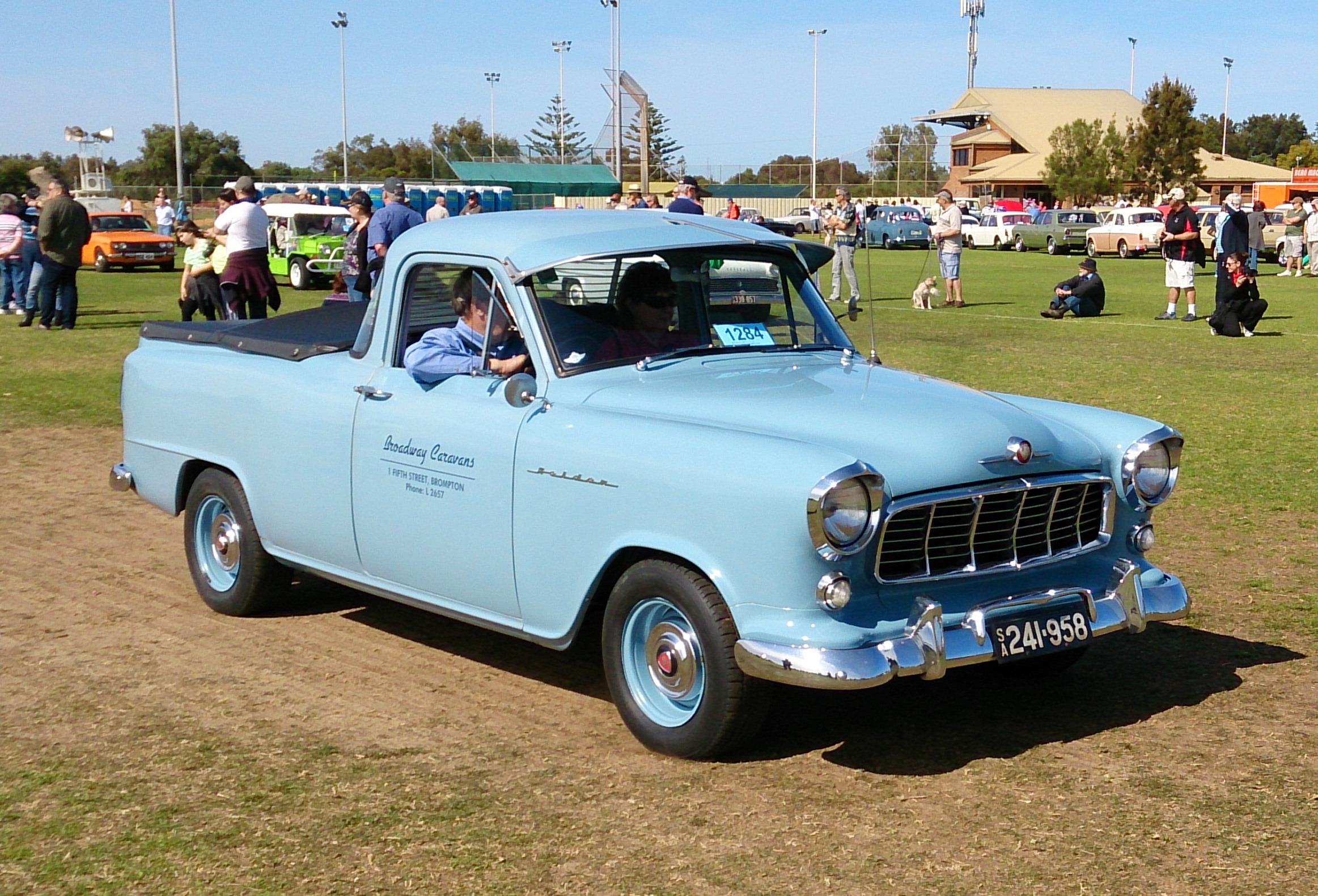
Holden Utility

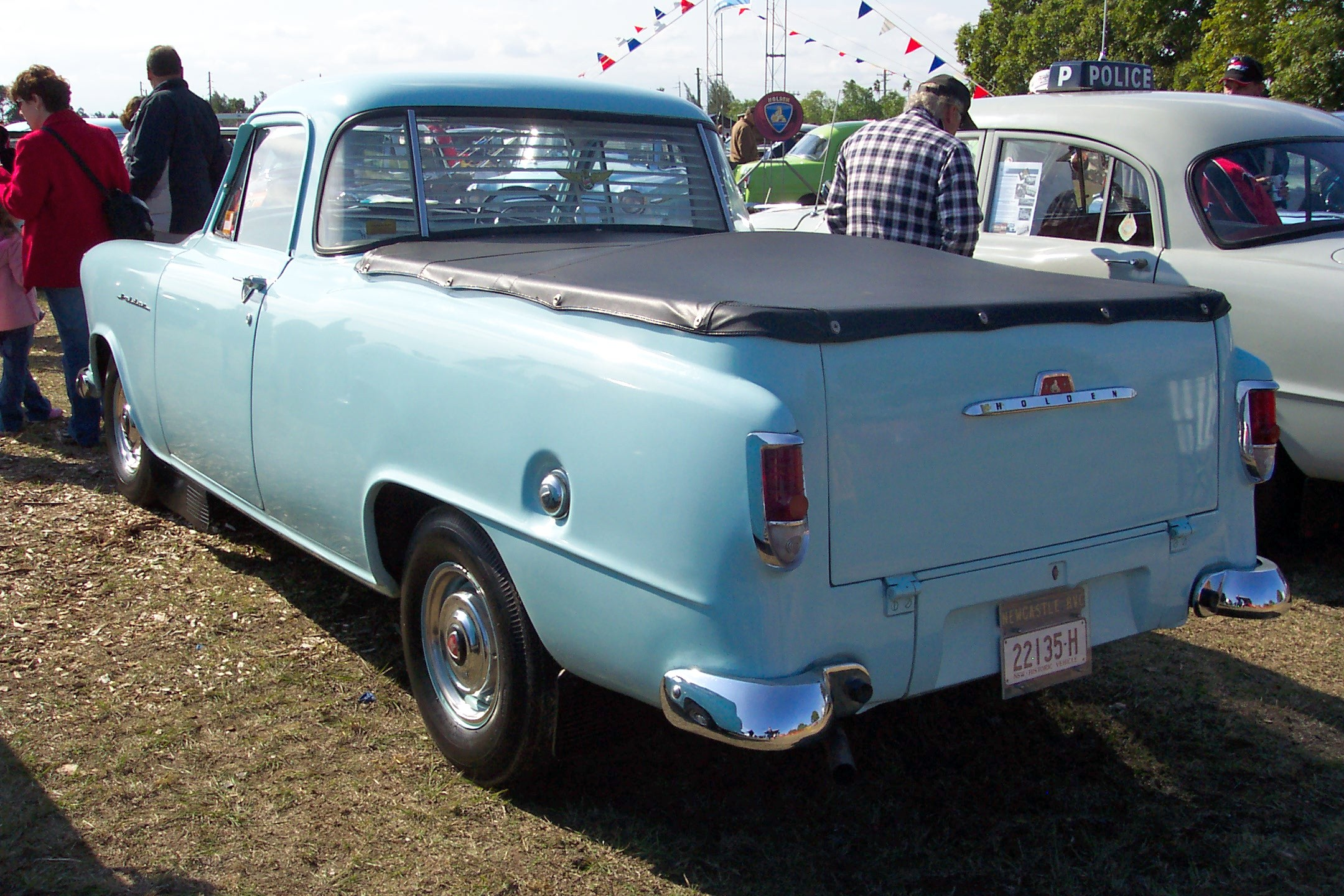
Holden Utility

== Production and replacement ==
After a production run of 155,161 vehicles the entire FE range was replaced by the Holden FC series in May 1958.

The FE was also the first Holden to be assembled locally in New Zealand, in 1957 and 1958.
