= Peugeot 403 =

French car produced from 1955–1966

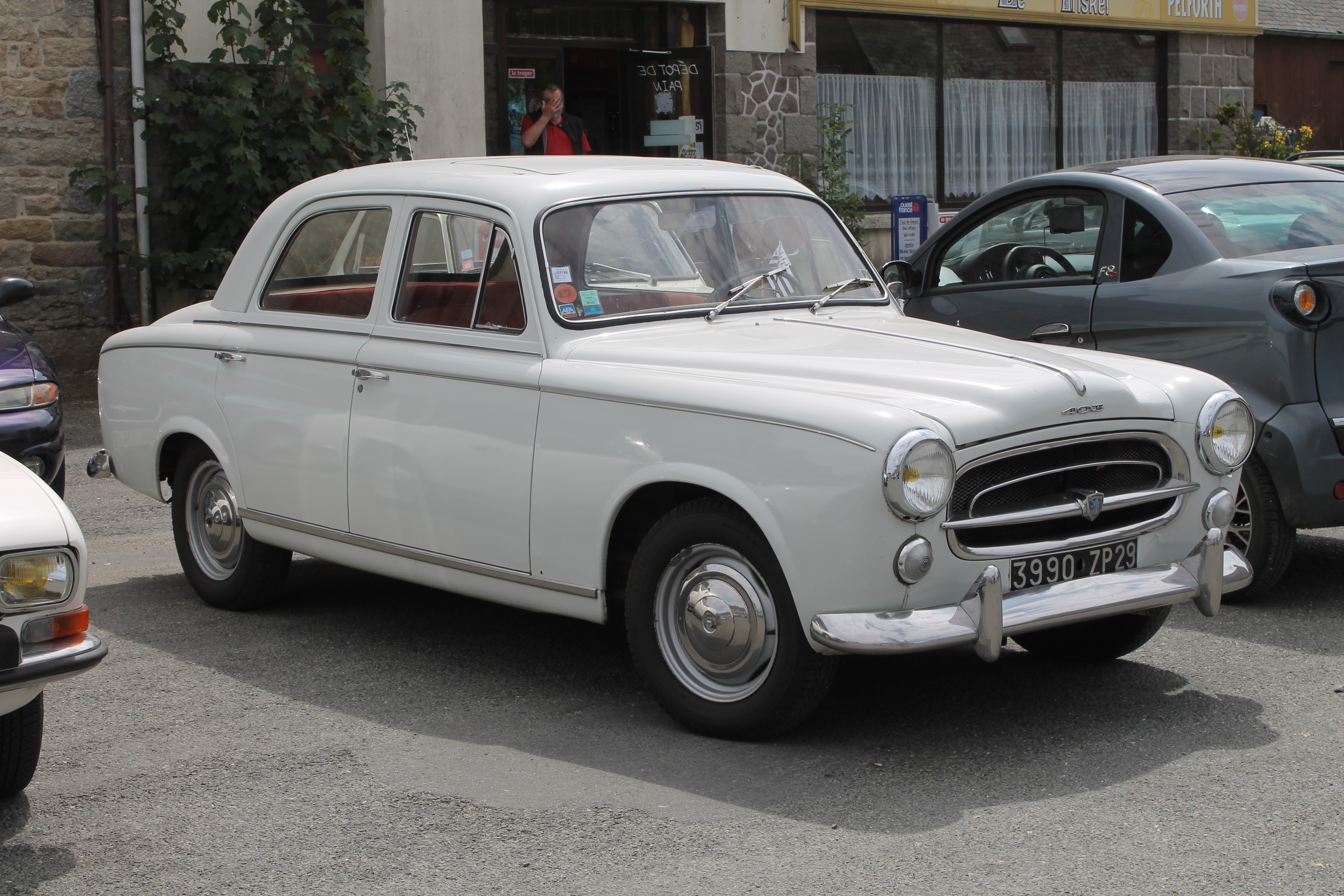
- Peugeot 403 saloon

Overview
- Manufacturer: Peugeot SA
- Production: May 1955 – October 1966; 1,214,121 built
- Assembly: France: Sochaux (Sochaux Plant); Australia: Melbourne; Argentina: Berazategui; New Zealand: Ōtāhuhu (Motor Holdings); Uruguay: Montevideo (Nordex S.A.)
- Designer: Pininfarina

Body and chassis
- Class: Large family car (D)
- Body style: 4-door saloon 5-door estate 2-door convertible (1956–1961); 2-door pickup 3-door van
- Layout: FR layout

Powertrain
- Engine: 1290 cc TM5 I4; 1468 cc TN3/XB2 I4; 1816 cc TMD85/XDP85 diesel I4
- Transmission: 4-speed manual

Dimensions
- Wheelbase: 2,660 mm (104.7 in) saloon 2,900 mm (114.2 in) estate
- Length: 4,470 mm (176.0 in) saloon 4,610 mm (181 in) estate
- Width: 1,670 mm (65.7 in)
- Height: 1,510 mm (59.4 in)

Chronology
- Predecessor: Peugeot 203; Peugeot 402
- Successor: Peugeot 404

The Peugeot 403 is a mid-size car manufactured and marketed by Peugeot between May 1955 and October 1966. A total of 1,214,121 of all types, including commercial models, were produced, making it the first Peugeot to exceed one million in sales.

== History ==
The 403 debuted as a sedan/saloon on 20 April 1955 at the Trocadéro Palace in Paris. For several months before it was launched, numerous 403s, their badges removed, were driving on the roads near the manufacturer's Sochaux factory. They became so familiar that the locals no longer noticed them, but attracted the Paris motoring press to a town usually of little interest to the national media.

The TN3 engine size gave the car a "tax horsepower" of 8 CV, which placed it a class below the soon-to-be-replaced 11 CV Citroën Traction, but at least one class above the small cars produced by the principal competitor manufacturers.

When it was first shown, and until after 1958, the leading edge of car's nose carried an angular, forward-leaning chrome lion bonnet ornament – as Peugeot's trade mark. That was removed for 1959, due to safety concerns, and the logo was incorporated into a shield-shaped grille emblem.

Subsequently the semaphore-style trafficators on the C-pillars were replaced with flashing indicators within the light cluster. The front lights were modified to conform to new standards and in 1957 parallel windscreen wipers were substituted for the original "cross hands" design featured at launch.

The car was subject to numerous improvements during production, mostly minor. Improvements for 1959 included moving the nozzles for the windscreen washer from the strip of metal between the base of the windscreen and the bonnet/hood a short distance to the rear edge of the bonnet/hood itself. This was also the year the semi-circular ring inside the lower half of the steering wheel operating the horn was replaced by a full circular horn-ring.

== Design ==
Styled by Pinin Farina, the 403 featured ponton, three-box styling incorporating, except on the most basic models, a metal sunroof. The collaboration with Pinin Farina marked the start of a partnership which would see the Italian designer producing designs for Peugeot, including those many mainstream volume models, for more than fifty years. Regarding the 403 itself there were persistent rumours that the design was one originally intended for a replacement Fiat 1900 which had been rejected when Turin had decided to defer replacement of the Fiat for another four years.

Unusual in Europe at the time were the wide, 90° opening rear doors. Also unusual were the windows in the rear doors that lowered fully, despite the intrusion of the wheel arch into the door frame.

== Engine ==
The 403 used an enlarged version of the Peugeot 203's 1290 cc petrol engine. Displacing 1468 cc, the straight-four unit employed pushrod-actuated valves and hemispherical combustion chambers and a crossflow cylinder head to produce 58 hp (43 kW) at about 4,900 rpm and 101 N⋅m (74 lb⋅ft) of torque at 2,500 rpm. Power increased to 65 hp (48 kW) in 1958. An unusual feature at the time was the thermostatically controlled engine fan, which cut out when the engine temperature fell to 75°C and reengaged when the engine temperature increased to 84°C. Claimed advantages included an improvement in fuel consumption of between 5% and 10% according to average speed and the avoidance, under many conditions, of fan noise. A small, hot water-activated heating device for the carburetor linked to the heater for the passenger cabin — operating only when the driver activated the cabin heat, but not when the ambient temperature was high enough for the heater to be left off.

A diesel powered Peugeot 403 estate was introduced in the autumn of 1958, the first of a long line, followed by a diesel saloon a year later.

After the 203's discontinuation in 1960, a 54 hp (40 kW) version of its 1290 cc powerplant became available as an option on a reduced specification version of the 403, branded initially as the "403 Sept" ("7") and soon afterwards as the "403 Berline Luxe". Car tax in France was mostly based on engine size, and the smaller engined 403 fell within the 7CV taxation class rather than the 8CV of the bigger version.

== Transmission ==
The 403 used a manual 4-speed all-synchromesh transmission driving the rear wheels. On LHD models, the gear change lever stuck out from the right side of the steering column.

For the Paris Motor Show in October 1957 the manufacturer offered, at extra cost, an electro-magnetic Jaeger automatic clutch, activated when changing gear.

== Interior ==
The front seats reclined, allowing their seat backs to be flush with the cushions of the rear seat, creating a "couchette".

== Body variants ==
The wheelbase was lengthened by 240 mm (9.4 in) for the five door Peugeot 403 "Familiale" and "Commerciale" estate versions. The Familiale provided a third row of seats and was described as a 7/8 seater while the Commerciale offered a more conventional seat configuration for an estate car.

The lengthened 403 estate had a solid rear axle fitted to an aluminum differential case. It used a manual column shift and in "Familiale" trim included fully reclinable front seats. Sunroof and steel belted radial tires were standard.

A two-door cabriolet version of the car was also offered, with a luxurious interior featuring high quality leather upholstery. In 1958 the 403 cabriolet cost 80% more than the entry level "berline grand luxe" 403 sedan, and presumably for this reason the convertible 403 was produced and sold only in very modest numbers. In the spring of 1961 production of the 403 cabriolet ended, in anticipation of the launch later that year of the manufacturer's 404 Cabriolet.

The 1960 Cabriolet convertible was made famous by the popular detective, "Columbo".[17]

2-door pickup and 3-door van commercial variants of the 403 were also produced.

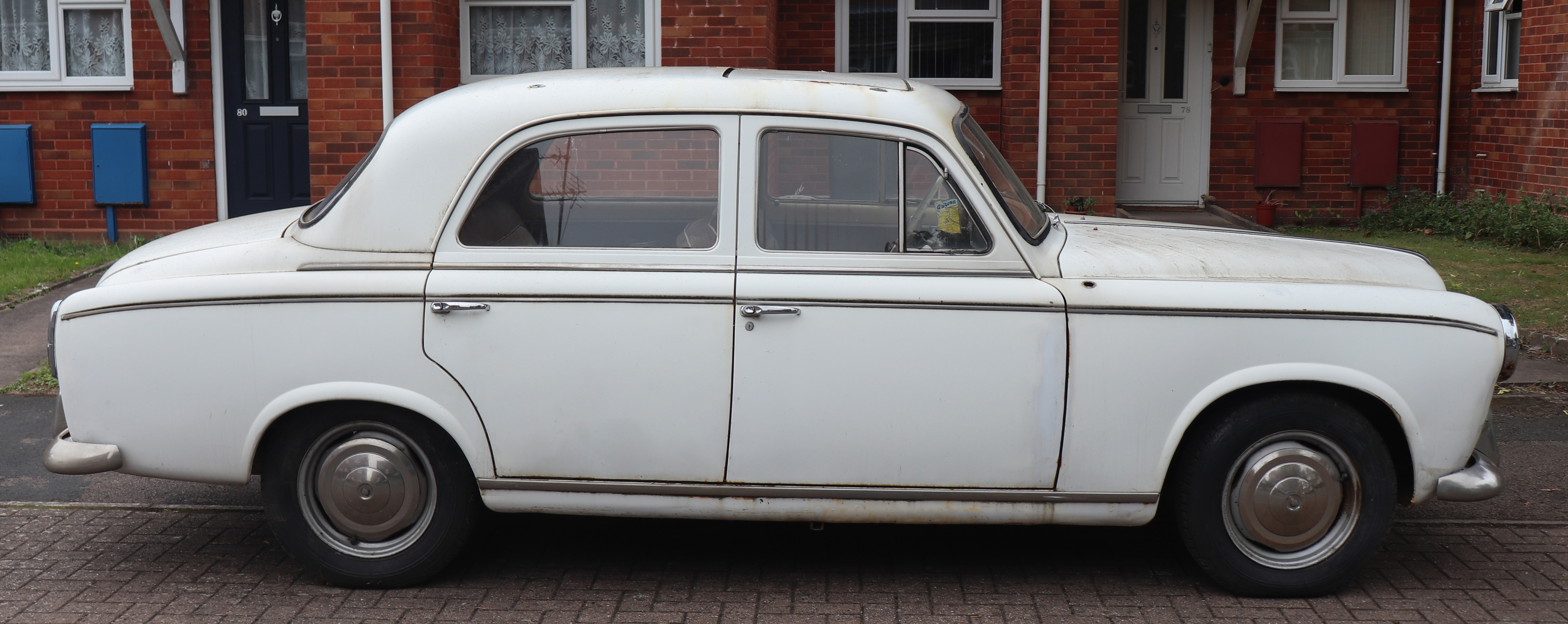
Saloon side

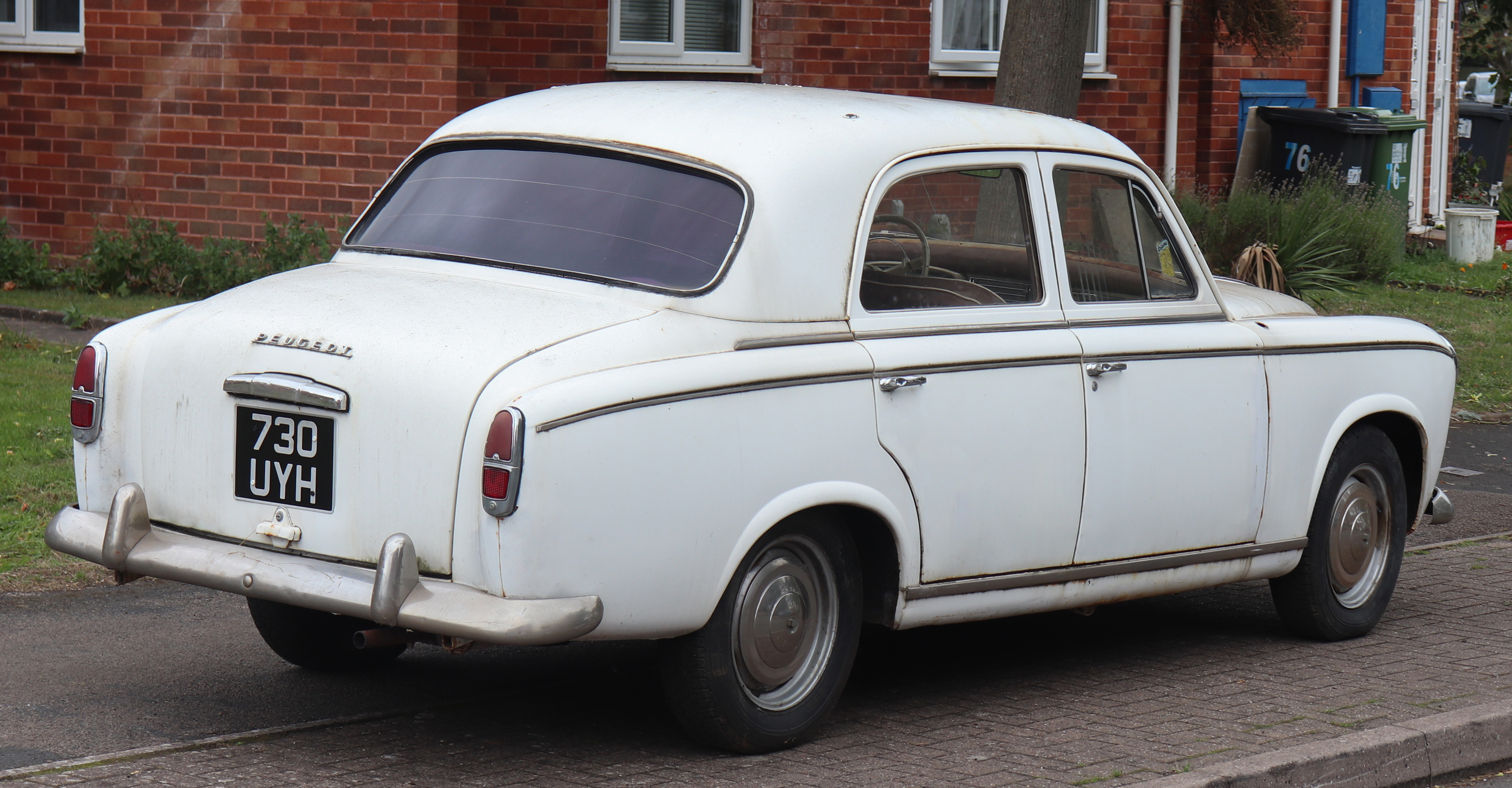
Saloon rear

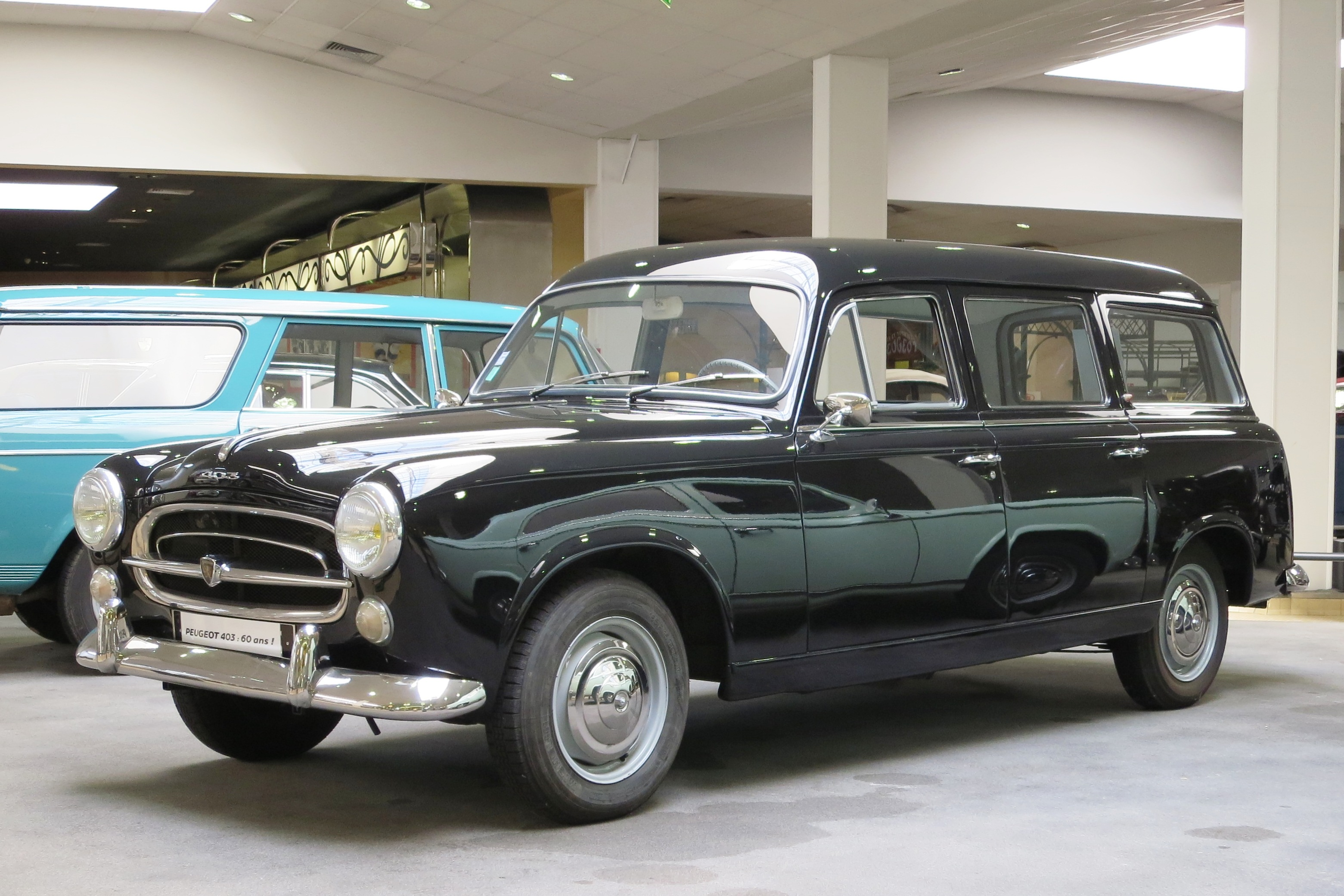
Familiale/Commerciale

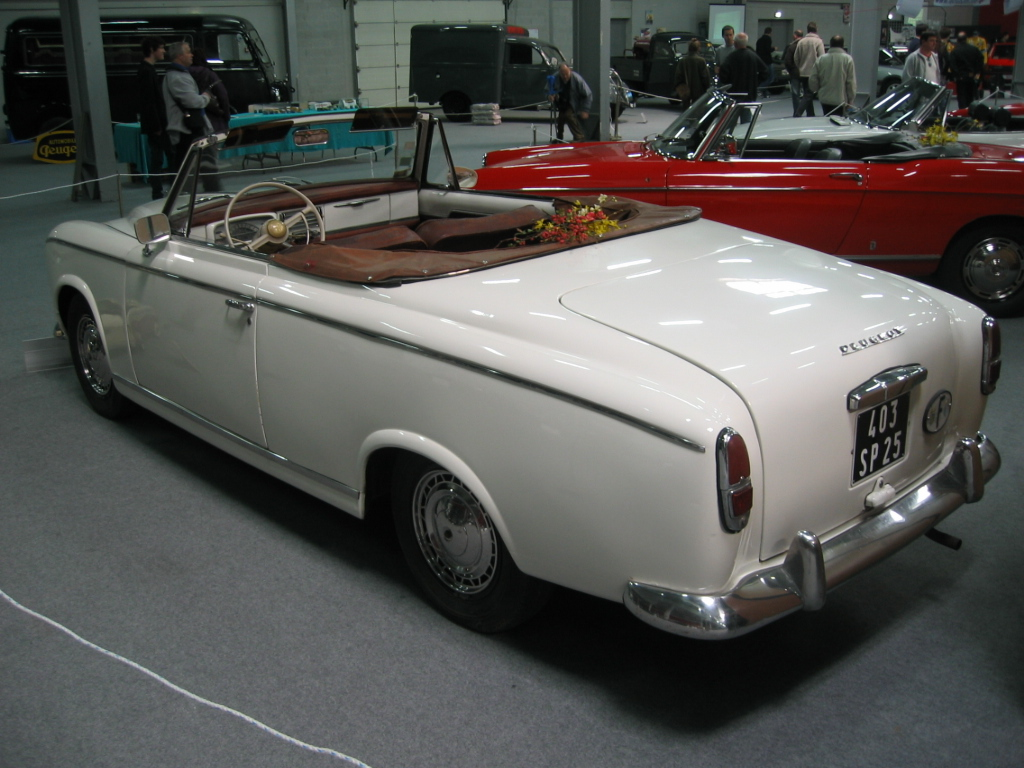
Cabriolet

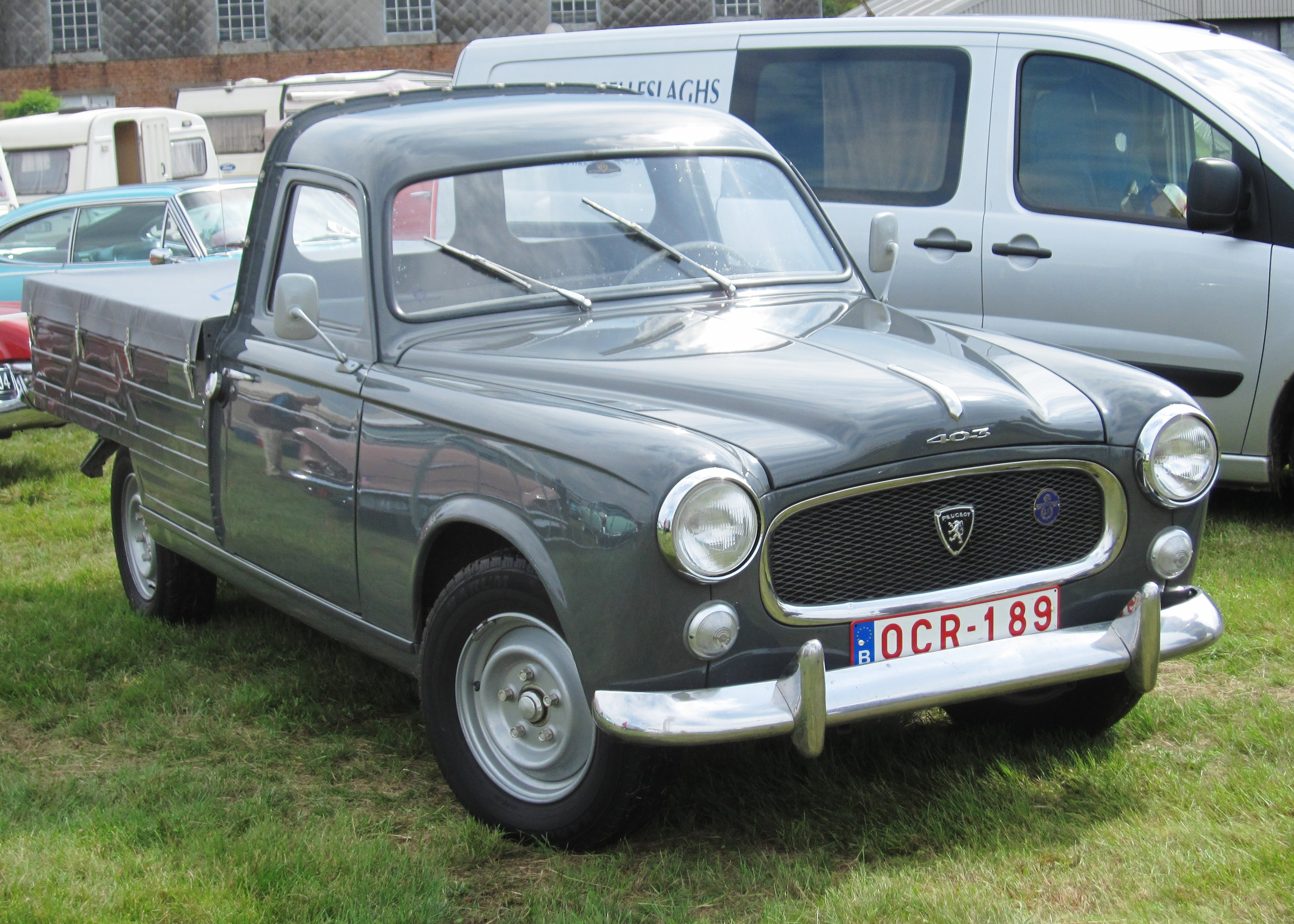
Pickup

== Production ==
Peugeot 403 production (units):

- 1955 ..... 21,326
- 1956 ..... 71,551
- 1957 ...
- 1958 ... 121,757
- 1959 ...
- 1960 ...
- 1961 ..... 78,296
- 1962 ....
- 1963 ....
- 1964 ..... 53,371
- 1965 ..... 27,296
- 1966 ..... 40,805 (incl. camionnettes)

This data does not include 403 based light trucks

Largely superseded by the Peugeot 404 in 1960, the 403 did remain available as a budget alternative. While the 403 saloon was taken out of production at the end of October 1966, leaving only the pickup truck (camionnette). This was supplanted by the 404 pickup in March 1967.

In addition to Argentinian and Australian production, the local Volkswagen assembler in New Zealand assembled 1,033 Peugeot 403s in just under four years, beginning in March 1960.

The Argentinian version reached 90% integration of local parts.

== In popular culture ==
A grey, derelict Peugeot 403 convertible served as the car of detective Columbo in the 1970s TV series of the same name. The car used in the series still exists and was sold to a private owner in Florida after the end of the series, who put it up for sale in 2022.
