= 1998 Round Australia Trial =

1998 Round Australia Trial Playstation Rally Round Australia
← Previous event
- Host country: Australia
- Rally base: Adelaide
- Dates run: 6 – 27 September 1998
- Stages: 21
- Stage surface: Tarmac and Gravel
- Overall distance: 18,500 km (11,500 miles)

Statistics
- Crews: 57 at start, 47 at finish

Overall results
- Overall winner: (Australia) Bruce Garland (Japan) Harry Suzuki; Bruce Garland Holden Motorsport

The 1998 Round Australia Trial, officially the Playstation Rally Round Australia was the fourteenth and last running of the Round Australia Trial. The rally took place between 6 and 27 September 1998. The event covered 18,500 kilometres around Australia. It was won by Bruce Garland and Harry Suzuki, driving a Holden Jackaroo..

== Results ==
Pos	No	Entrant	Drivers	Car	Overall Time No. of Stages Missed (ms)
1	3	(Australia) Isuzu-General Motors; Bruce Garland Motorsport	(Australia) Bruce Garland (Japan) Harry Suzuki	Holden Jackaroo	34hr 27min 19sec
2	05	(Australia) Isuzu-General Motors; Bruce Garland Motorsport	(Australia) Peter Brock (Australia) Wayne Webster	Holden Jackaroo	34hr 56min 3sec
3	54	(Australia) Robert Gambino	(Australia) David Lowe (Australia) Robert Gambino	Datsun 180B SSS	37hr 29min 5sec
4	4	(Australia) Warren Ridge Car Rallying	(Australia) Warren Ridge (Australia) Joy Ridge	Mitsubishi Pajero	37hr 50min 16sec
5	8	(Australia) Owen Rally Team	(Australia) Reg Owen (Australia) Russell Cairns	Nissan Patrol	37hr 55min 25sec
6	18	(Australia) Pedders Suspension	(Australia) Ron Pedder (Australia) Scott Pedder	Holden Commodore VS Ute	38hr 2min 29sec
7	6	(Australia) Edwards Rally Team	(Australia) Kevin Edwards (Australia) Martin Reeves	Ford Falcon EF XR6	38hr 3min 3sec
8	14	(Australia) Del Garbett Rally Sport	(Australia) Mark Griffith (Australia) Del Garbett	Toyota RAV4	38hr 47min 41sec
9	69	(Australia) Hunter Racing	(Australia) Colin Hunter (Australia) Guy Basile	Jeep Grand Cherokee	39hr 6min 56sec
10	13	(Australia) Ian Swan Ford Explorer Team	(Australia) Steve Cornwall (Australia) Stewart Cornwall	Ford Explorer	40hr 12min 51sec
11	32	(Australia) John Williams	(Australia) John Williams (Australia) Mike Batten	Holden Monaro HT	40hr 59min 41sec
12	58	(Australia) Dennis Barber	(Australia) Dennis Barber (Australia) Andrew Crane	Peugeot 504	41hr 9min 11sec
13	21	(Australia) Murray Rogers	(Australia) Murray Rogers (Australia) Russell McKenzie	Holden Commodore VH	42hr 53min 19sec
14	96	(Australia) Hunter Racing	(Australia) Dennis McGregor (Australia) Mark Matschoss	Toyota Land Cruiser Ute	43hr 14min 43sec
15	24	(Australia) Entire Building Concepts	(Australia) Daniel Murphy (Australia) Steve Poore	Holden Commodore VH	43hr 41min 4sec
16	31	(Australia) Alan Cameron	(Australia) Alan Cameron (Australia) Ted Rogers	Holden Torana LJ XU-1	44hr 36min 33sec
17	35	(Australia) Graham Birrell	(Australia) Richard Pollock (Australia) Graham Birrell	Peugeot 504	45hr 10min 4sec
18	27	(Australia) Peter Cochrane Transport	(Australia) Peter Cochrane (Australia) Duncan Richter	Ford Falcon ED XR6	45hr 20min 39sec
19	66	(Australia) Don Williams	(Australia) David Hodge (Australia) Donald Williams	Rover 3500 SD1	46hr 28min 44sec
20	29	(Australia) Andrew Smith	(Australia) Ewan Jones (Australia) Andrew Smith	Alfa Romeo GTV	48hr 1min 47sec
21	16	(Australia) Daniel Castro	(Australia) Danny Castro (Australia) Anthony Hudson	Datsun 1600	48hr 5min 55sec
22	72	(Australia) N.J. Hawkins	(Australia) Neville Hawkins (Australia) Shirley Hawkins	Toyota Land Cruiser	49hr 11min 55sec
23	34	(Australia) Team Phillips	(Australia) Steve Phillips (Australia) David Phillips (Australia) Jason Neasy	Toyota 4 Runner	49hr 59min 39sec
24	39	(Australia) L.G. Matheson	(Australia) Gordon Matheson (Australia) Michael Matheson	Ford Falcon XT GT	58hr 59min 24sec
25	404	(Australia) Chris Hall	(Australia) Chris Hall (Australia) Ron Fraser (Australia) Matt Windrum	Peugeot 404	1ms 55hr 30min 13sec
26	61	(Australia) P.M. Holloway	(Australia) Michael Holloway (Australia) Timothy Kennon	Holden Monaro HT	4ms 55hr 57min 31sec
27	53	(Australia) Barry Ferguson	(Australia) Barry Ferguson (Australia) Brett Wright	Volkswagen Beetle	6ms 55hr 36min 34sec
28	9	(Australia) Pedders Suspension	(Australia) Graeme Wise (Australia) Linda Long	Holden Commodore VS Ute	7ms 44hr 18min 52sec
29	505	(Australia) Peter Champion Mining Pty Ltd	(Australia) Peter Champion (Australia) Ken Long (Australia) Joe Caudo	Holden Commodore VR	7ms 48hr 25min 43sec
30	214	(Australia) Gary Randell	(Australia) Gary Randell (Australia) Eric Clementson	Volvo 142	7ms 60hr 53min 41sec
31	121	(Australia) Sutton Rallying	(Australia) Dennis Sutton (Australia) David O'Neil	Ford Falcon EF XR6	10ms 59hr 2min 12sec
32	83	(Australia) H.I. Enter	(Australia) Humphrey Enter (Australia) Kim Reynolds	Triumph 2000 Mark I	13ms 61hr 41min 13sec
33	15	(Australia) Peter George	(Australia) Peter George (Australia) Jane Oliver	Datsun 1600	13ms 62hr 35min 28sec
34	26	(Australia) Lockhart Holden Gold Coast	(Australia) Peter Lockhart (Australia) Tim Donovan	Holden Jackaroo	17ms 56hr 1min 17sec
35	1	(Australia) Rolin Motorsport	(Australia) Michael Guest (Australia) Jason Walk (Australia) Paul Pyyvaara	Subaru Impreza WRX STi	17ms 60hr 29min 48sec
36	51	(Australia) New Pioneer Motors	(Australia) Keith Callinan (Australia) Paul Couper	Holden Commodore VR	18ms 59hr 16min 42sec
37	237	(Australia) Alastair McKechnie	(Australia) Alastair McKechnie (Australia) John Thain	Holden EH	19ms 71hr 28min 57sec
38	955	(Australia) Eon McDonald	(Australia) Eon McDonald (Australia) Victor Willman	Holden Torana LJ	22ms 76hr 45min 31sec
39	17	(Australia) Barry Rowe	(Australia) Barry Rowe (Australia) Michael Ellis	MG MGB GT	32ms 87hr 24min 37sec
40	911	(Australia) Dr. Lloyd Hughes	(Australia) Lloyd Hughes (Australia) Peter Meddows	Renault 12 GL	37ms 104hr 54min 1sec
41	240	(Australia) Geoff McEwan	(Australia) Geoffrey McEwan (Australia) Andrew D'espeissis	Holden EH	47ms 116hr 40min 35sec
42	300	(Australia) Stewart Rally Team	(Australia) David Stewart (Australia) Graeme Rogers	Ford Falcon EL XR6	50ms 112hr 8min 46sec
43	23	(Australia) Team Bairstow Motorsport	(Australia) Simon Bairstow (Australia) Stephan Kulynycz	Datsun Stanza	66ms 137hr 59min 19sec
44	112	(Australia) D.J. Coote	(Australia) Douglas Coote (Australia) Cono Onofaro	Morris Cooper S	86ms 168hr 37min 1sec
45	47	(Australia) Colin Stewart & John Darby	(Australia) John Darby (Australia) Colin Stewart	Mitsubishi Galant VR-4	94ms 164hr 20min 35sec
46	40	(Australia) John Fraser	(Australia) John Fraser (Australia) Gwyn Mulholland	Toyota Corolla FX-GT	95ms 163hr 12min 32sec
47	226	(Australia) Graham McPherson	(Australia) Graham McPherson (Australia) Ray Scheiwe (Australia) R. Morgan	Ford Fairlane FD Compact	99ms 186hr 23min 7sec
