= 1995 Round Australia Trial =

1995 Round Australia Trial Mobil 1 Trial
← Previous event	Next event →
- Host country: Australia
- Rally base: Brisbane; Gold Coast
- Dates run: 13 June – 2 July 1995
- Stages: 22
- Stage surface: Tarmac and Gravel
- Overall distance: 18,500 km (11,500 miles)

Statistics
- Crews: 84 at start, 65 at finish

Overall results
- Overall winner: (Australia) Ed Ordynski (Australia) Ross Runnalls; Mobil Bridgestone Holden Rally Team

The 1995 Round Australia Trial, officially the Mobil 1 Trial was the thirteenth running of the Round Australia Trial. The rally took place between 13 June and 2 July 1995. The event covered 18,500 kilometres around Australia. It was won by Ed Ordynski and Ross Runnalls, driving a Holden Commodore VR.

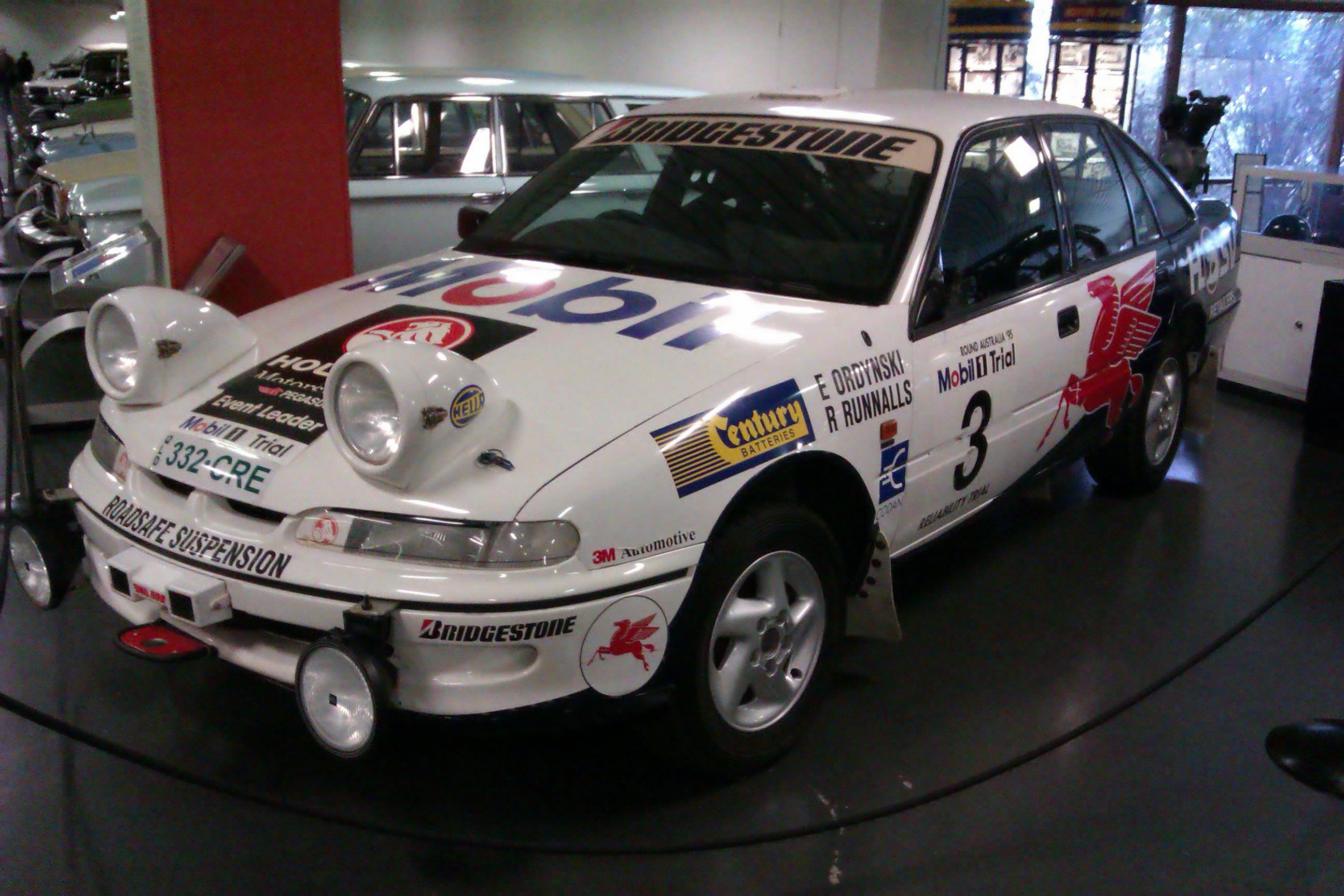
The winning Holden Commodore VR of Ed Ordynski and Ross Runnalls, pictured in 2012

== Results ==
Pos	No	Entrant	Drivers	Car	Overall Time No. of Stages Missed (ms)
1	3	(Australia) Mobil Bridgestone Holden Rally Team	(Australia) Ed Ordynski (Australia) Ross Runnalls	Holden Commodore VR	23hr 29min 12sec
2	2	(Australia) Rod Salmon	(Australia) Michael Guest (Australia) Rod Salmon	Mitsubishi Galant VR-4	23hr 39min 32sec
3	8	(Australia) Stephen Ashton	(Australia) Stephen Ashton (Australia) Rosemary Nixon	Mitsubishi Lancer Evo I RS	24hr 1min 19sec
4	15	(Australia) Isuzu-GMA Rally Team	(Australia) Bruce Garland (Japan) Harry Suzuki	Holden Jackaroo LWB	24hr 17min 11sec
5	19	(Australia) Peter Glennie	(Australia) Peter Glennie (Australia) Peter Clark	Toyota Land Cruiser RV80	24hr 55min 37sec
6	18	(Australia) Les Siviour Nissan Team	(Australia) Les Siviour (Australia) David Brown	Nissan Patrol	25hr 10min 44sec
7	21	(Australia) Terry Denham	(Australia) Terry Denham (Australia) Raymond Stubbs	Mitsubishi Pajero	25hr 28min 11sec
8	25	(Australia) I.A. Swan Ford Rally Team	(Australia) Ian Swan (Australia) Val Swan	Ford Falcon XG XR6 Longreach Ute	25hr 38min 38sec
9	12	(Australia) Anthony Wurf	(Australia) Anthony Wurf (Australia) Rowan Quill	Mitsubishi Galant VR-4	26hr 1min 38sec
10	88	(Australia) Richard Anderson	(Australia) Richard Anderson (Australia) Bruno Fulcher	Alfa Romeo 75	26hr 8min 51sec
11	23	(Australia) North Shore Sporting Car Club	(Australia) Jim Middleton (Australia) Philip Morley	Holden Commodore VR	26hr 32min 29sec
12	26	(Australia) Isuzu-GMA Rally Team	(Australia) Peter Lockhart (Australia) Timothy Donovan	Holden Jackaroo LWB	26hr 53min 48sec
13	16	(Australia) Andrew Stott Nissan Team	(Australia) Andrew Brown (Australia) Andrew Stott	Nissan Patrol	26hr 54min 29sec
14	104	(Australia) Terry Harris	(Australia) Terry Harris (Australia) John Seymour	Ford Falcon XT GT	27hr 15min 11sec
15	17	(Australia) Andrew Stott Nissan Team	(Australia) Terry Connor (Australia) Des Harrington	Nissan Patrol	27hr 29min 42sec
16	33	(Australia) John Spencer	(Australia) John Spencer (Australia) Charles Camilleri	Toyota Corolla Levin	27hr 43min 26sec
17	80	(Australia) Hal Moloney	(Australia) Hal Moloney (Australia) David Watera	Leyland P76 Targa Florio	27hr 48min 26sec
18	44	(Australia) Keith Harris	(Australia) Keith Harris (Australia) Gary Tierney	Datsun Stanza	28hr 9min 21sec
19	28	(Australia) Barrie Edmonds Ford Rally Team	(Australia) Barrie Edmonds (Australia) Stephen Cornwall	Ford Falcon XG XR6 Longreach Ute	28hr 30min 49sec
20	95	(Australia) Kirk Marks	(Australia) Kirk Marks (Australia) Peter Mahony	Toyota Corolla RV	28hr 45min 11sec
21	36	(Australia) Denis Baker	(Australia) Denis Baker (Australia) Gerry Bashford	Holden Commodore VC	29hr 23min 54sec
22	34	(Australia) Paul Carpenter	(Australia) Richard McNay (Australia) Paul Carpenter	Toyota Celica GT	29hr 38min 37sec
23	51	(Australia) Alan Cameron	(Australia) Alan Cameron (Australia) Ted Rogers	Holden Torana LJ XU-1	31hr 50min 24sec
24	13	IBM (Australia)	(Australia) Michael Myers (Australia) Toni Myers	Toyota Celica GT-Four	33hr 26min 51sec
25	20	(Australia) Jean-Claude Mutschler	(Australia) Jean-Claude Mutschler (Australia) Phil Torode	Peugeot 504	35hr 18min 58sec
26	72	(Australia) N.J. Hawkins	(Australia) Neville Hawkins (Australia) Shirley Hawkins	Toyota Land Cruiser GXL Wagon	35hr 51min 8sec
27	58	(Australia) Denis Barber	(Australia) Denis Barber (Australia) Andrew Crane	Peugeot 504	1ms 32hr 9min 6sec
28	32	(Australia) Larry Walsh	(Australia) Graeme Mathieson (Australia) Larry Walsh	Ford Falcon ED XR6	1ms 32hr 42min 4sec
29	56	(Australia) Suzuki Auto Centre	(Australia) Bill Monkhouse (Australia) David Hermann	Suzuki Vitara	1ms 33hr 2min 54sec
30	37	(Australia) L.J. Beacham	(Australia) Lawrie Beacham (Australia) James Rosenow	Ford Falcon XT GT	2ms 30hr 10min 1sec
31	05	(Australia) Mobil Bridgestone Holden Rally Team	(Australia) Peter Brock (Australia) Dave Boddy	Holden Commodore VR	2ms 30hr 50min 52sec
32	70	(Australia) Australian Plastic Profiles	(Australia) David Hills (Australia) Michael Tuckey	Triumph 2.5 PI Mark I	2ms 34hr 53min 36sec
33	48	(Australia) Mark Laidlay	(Australia) Alan Upton (Australia) Mark Laidlay	Peugeot 504	2ms 36hr 30min 25sec
34	27	(Australia) Peter Cochrane Transport	(Australia) Peter Cochrane (Australia) Duncan Ritchie	Ford Falcon ED XR6	2ms 38hr 45min 22sec
35	59	(Australia) T.R. Eastwood	(Australia) Trevor Eastwood (Australia) David Hartley	Holden Monaro HK	2ms 40hr 38min 38sec
36	31	(Australia) John Coker	(Australia) John Coker (Australia) Dennis Green	Mitsubishi Pajero	3ms 36hr 12min 9sec
37	49	(Australia) John Williams	(Australia) Barry Ferguson (Australia) John Williams	Holden Monaro HT	5ms 38hr 23min 24sec
38	65	(Australia) Peter Thompson	(Australia) Michael Valentine (Australia) Peter Thompson	Toyota Celica RA20	5ms 39hr 35min 11sec
39	79	(Australia) Herbert Gutmann	(Australia) Herbert Gutmann (Australia) Peter Gutmann	Volkswagen Beetle	5ms 43hr 2min 39sec
40	68	(Australia) Richard Owen	(Australia) David Owen (Australia) Gary Ratcliffe	Peugeot 504	7ms 42hr 37min 2sec
41	61	(Australia) P.M. Holloway	(Australia) Michael Holloway (Australia) David McAdam	Holden Monaro HT	7ms 47hr 38min 37sec
42	53	(Australia) George Bevan	(Australia) George Bevan (Australia) Gerry Lister	Volvo 144S	10ms 52hr 34min 53sec
43	55	(Australia) J.J. Caudo	(Australia) Joe Caudo (Australia) Peter Barrow	Citroën ID 19	10ms 55hr 18min 2sec
44	84	(Australia) Ray Hoey	(Australia) Ray Hoey (Australia) Bruce Spunner	Holden HD X2	10ms 58hr 40min 29sec
45	45	(Australia) Michael Burleigh	(Australia) Michael Burleigh (Australia) Richard Timbs	Porsche 911	11ms 49hr 37min 0sec
46	64	(Australia) George Reynolds	(Australia) George Reynolds (Australia) Mike Keenan	Volkswagen Beetle	12ms 53hr 25min 56sec
47	40	(Australia) Western Plains Automotive	(Australia) Howard Laughton (Australia) Stanley La Vin	Mercedes-Benz 280E	12ms 53hr 27min 44sec
48	63	(Australia) Ronald Verschuur	(Australia) Ronald Verschuur (Australia) Ben Verschuur	Ford Falcon XR 500	12ms 58hr 14min 50sec
49	41	(Australia) Ross Lamb	(Australia) Ross Lamb (Australia) John Gorman	Datsun 280Z	13ms 49hr 6min 22sec
50	38	(Australia) Barry Rowe	(Australia) Barry Rowe (Australia) Michael Ellis	MG MGB GT	13ms 58hr 1min 26sec
51	82	(Australia) Pittsale Pty Ltd	(Australia) Allan Lawson (Australia) Stephen Simmons	Toyota Crown	14ms 52hr 44min 50sec
52	52	(Australia) Kevin Edwards	(Australia) Kevin Edwards (Australia) Noel Doyle	Volvo 144S	15ms 59hr 21min 34sec
53	78	(Australia) Greg Nicholson	(Australia) Greg Nicholson (Australia) John Mitchell	Mitsubishi Lancer GSR	15ms 61hr 41min 49sec
54	24	(Australia) Pedders Suspension	(Australia) Ron Pedder (Australia) Mark Pedder	Holden Commodore VP Ute	16ms 49hr 17min 20sec
55	103	(Australia) Andersons Bus Lines	(Australia) John Anderson (Australia) Kenneth Grindrod	Peugeot 203	18ms 57hr 1min 37sec
56	73	(Australia) Bruce Dillon	(Australia) Bruce Dillon (Australia) Leona Gleeson	Mitsubishi Colt 1000F	20ms 54hr 24min 49sec
57	47	(Australia) Terry Naish	(Australia) Terry Naish (Australia) Richard Mason	Datsun 1600	21ms 52hr 24min 9sec
58	50	(Australia) Ross Alexander	(Australia) John Gerathy (Australia) Ross Alexander	Holden Monaro HT	23ms 61hr 44min 47sec
59	87	(Australia) Australian Calibrating Service	(Australia) Tim Kennon (Australia) Neil McDowell	Austin 1800 Mark II	23ms 67hr 41min 24sec
60	66	(Australia) Donald Williams	(Australia) Donald Williams (Australia) Philip Nicholson	Rover 3500 SD1	25ms 69hr 51min 48sec
61	74	(Australia) Virginia Bevan	(Australia) Virginia Bevan (Australia) Robyn McLennan	Volvo 122S	25ms 76hr 49min 58sec
62	85	(Australia) Geoff Thomas	(Australia) Geoff Thomas (Australia) Frank Rice	Triumph 2000 Mark II	26ms 68hr 32min 37sec
63	83	(Australia) H.I. Enter	(Australia) Humphrey Enter (Australia) Kim Reynolds	Triumph 2.5 PI Mark I	30ms 67hr 31min 49sec
64	62	(Australia) John Malcolm	(Australia) John Malcolm (Australia) Kylie Malcolm	Datsun 240Z	30ms 71hr 20min 40sec
65	77	(Australia) Graham O'Connor	(Australia) Graham O'Connor (Australia) John Hudson	Lancia Fulvia Coupe Rallye 1.6 HF	31ms 70hr 30min 12sec
