= Isuzu Trooper =

SUV by the Japanese automaker Isuzu

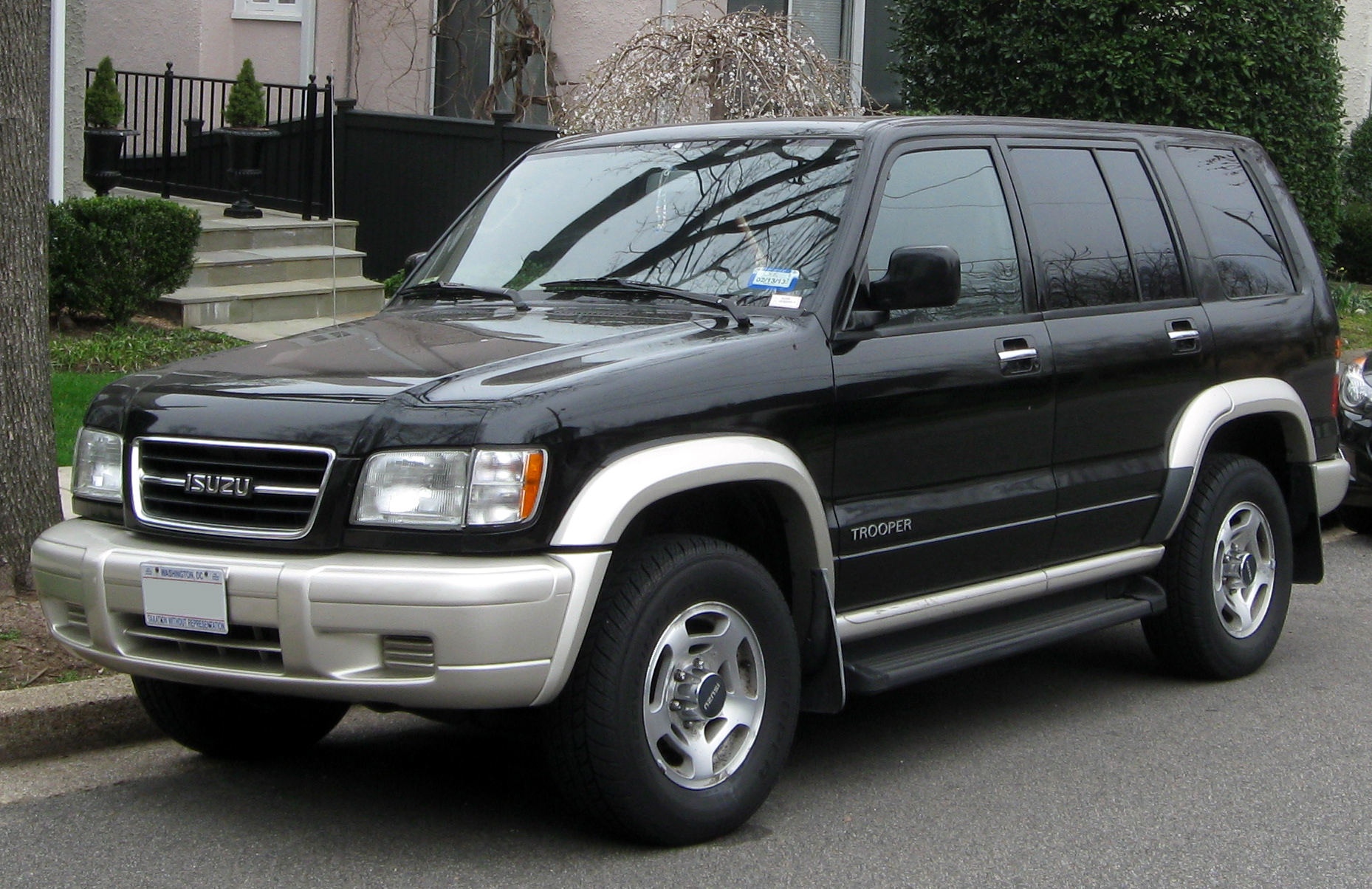
- Second generation Isuzu Trooper (United States)

Overview
- Manufacturer: Isuzu
- Also called: Isuzu Bighorn (Japan)
- Production: 1981–2002
- Assembly: Japan: Fujisawa, Kanagawa (Fujisawa Plant)

Body and chassis
- Class: Mid-size SUV
- Layout: Front-engine, four-wheel-drive; Front-engine, rear-wheel-drive
- Chassis: Body-on-frame

Chronology
- Successor: Isuzu Ascender; Isuzu Axiom; Chevrolet/Holden Captiva (Chevrolet Trooper/Holden Jackaroo/Monterey); Holden Colorado 7 (Australia); SsangYong Rexton (SsangYong Korando Family); Acura MDX (Acura SLX); Subaru Forester (Subaru Bighorn)

The Isuzu Trooper is a mid-size SUV manufactured and marketed by Isuzu between September 1981 and September 2002 over two generations, the first, produced between 1981 and 1991; and the second (UBS) produced between 1991 and 2002, the latter with a mid-cycle refresh in 1998. In its earliest iterations, the Trooper was based on the company's first generation Isuzu Faster/Chevrolet LUV pickup.

Marketed in the Japanese domestic market, as the Isuzu Bighorn (Japanese: いすゞ・ビッグホーン, Hepburn: Isuzu Bigguhōn), Isuzu marketed it internationally primarily as the Trooper, and in other markets as the Acura SLX (USA), Chevrolet Trooper, Subaru Bighorn, SsangYong Korando Family, Honda Horizon, Opel Monterey, Vauxhall Monterey, Holden Jackaroo, and Holden Monterey.

In the United States, for the first generation, which was initially solely offered with two doors, Isuzu was required to comply with the 25% U.S. Chicken Tax on two-door trucks. Prior to its formal introduction Paul Geiger, product-development manager at American Isuzu Motors, noted the Roman numeral "II" designated the truck version (with the rear seat as a mandatory $300 option) and "I" indicating the passenger version with a rear seat included along with certain other features. Isuzu thus marketed the first generation two-door as the Trooper II, and when introducing the four-door retained the Trooper II nameplate. Isuzu never formally marketed a Trooper I, and Car & Driver later inferred the company had changed their mind about the suffix before the SUV went on sale.

Isuzu offered the Trooper initially with four-cylinder motor, four-speed manual transmission, and part-time four-wheel drive, subsequently adding amenities and luxuries, including optional air-conditioning, power windows, and a more powerful V6 engine. The second generation was available with two-wheel- or four-wheel drive.

Competitors included the Toyota Hilux Surf, Mitsubishi Pajero, and Nissan Terrano.

== First generation (1981) ==
First generation
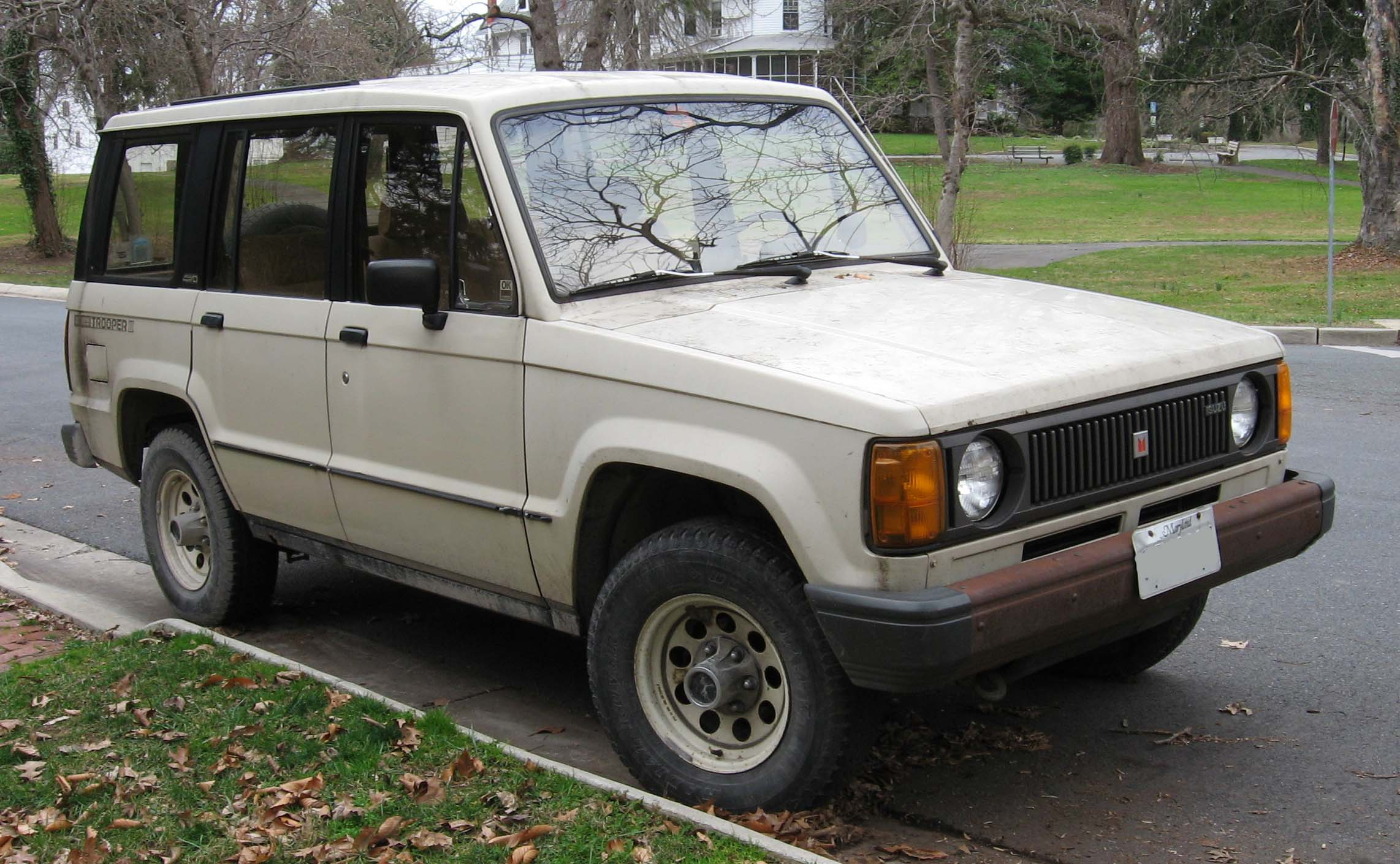

Overview
- Also called: Isuzu Bighorn; Isuzu Rodeo Bighorn; Holden Jackaroo; Chevrolet Trooper; SsangYong Korando Family (South Korea); Subaru Bighorn; Caribe 442 (Venezuela); Mekong Star 4WD (Vietnam); GMC TrailBlazer (Middle East)
- Production: September 1981–1991; November 1988–1996 (Korando Family); 1992–1997 (Vietnam)
- Assembly: Japan: Fujisawa, Kanagawa (Fujisawa Plant); Colombia: Bogotá, DC (GM Colmotores Plant); Indonesia: Jakarta (Garmak Motor); Philippines: Dasmariñas (Pilipinas GM); Venezuela: Las Tejerías, Aragua (Mack de Venezuela, CA); Vietnam: Ho Chi Minh City (Mekong Auto)

Body and chassis
- Body style: 3/5-door SUV; 2-door utility roadster
- Related: Isuzu Faster

Powertrain
- Engine: Petrol: 1949 cc G200Z I4 (UBS13); 2255 cc 4ZD1 I4 (UBS16); 2559 cc 4ZE1 I4 (UBS17); 2837 cc LH7/LL2 V6; Diesel: 2238 cc C223 I4 (UBS52); 2238 cc C223T turbo I4 (UBS52); 2771 cc 4JB1 I4 (UBS55); 2771 cc 4JB1-T turbo I4 (UBS55)
- Transmission: 4-speed Isuzu MSG manual 5-speed Isuzu MSG manual 5-speed Isuzu MUA5C manual 4-speed Aisin Warner automatic 4-speed GM 4L30-E transmission automatic

Dimensions
- Wheelbase: 2,300 mm (90.6 in) (3-door SWB); 2,650 mm (104.3 in) (3-door LWB, 5-door)
- Length: 4,075 mm (160.4 in) (SWB); 4,380 mm (172.4 in) (LWB)
- Width: 1,650 mm (65.0 in)
- Height: 1,800–1,830 mm (70.9–72.0 in)

The first-generation Trooper, introduced in September 1981, was available as a three-door wagon or a soft top with independent front suspension. The soft-top model sold slowly and did not last long. In the Japanese market, the car was originally introduced as the "Isuzu Rodeo Bighorn", but the "Rodeo" part of the name was dropped in January 1984. Early engines included a 1.95-liter gasoline and a 73 PS (54 kW) 2.2-liter diesel, underpowered even by early-1980s standards for the vehicle's 3,700 lb (1,678 kg) empty weight. The four-wheel-drive system was engaged by operating a three-position shifter adjacent to the transmission shifter. Both Aisin manual-locking and Isuzu's own auto-locking hubs were employed.

In 1983, Isuzu introduced the five-door version and the 4ZD1 four-cylinder engine 97 PS (71 kW; 96 hp) 2.3-liter petrol engine. Apart from higher power, changes to the previous engine included a Kevlar timing belt replacing the previous chain, and a larger two-barrel carburetor. Also available only for 1986 in the US was the 87 PS (64 kW) 2.2-liter C223T turbocharged diesel engine which had been introduced to Japan in January 1984, using a Garrett turbocharger. It was not a popular option, and Isuzu North America changed to the larger 4ZE1 four-cylinder petrol unit for 1988, and then used the standard 2.8-liter GM V6 for 1989 until their own new V6 engines could enter production.

In 1987, the rectangular headlights were introduced, and LS trim was available for the five doors. For 1988, the 4ZD1 (2.3-liter) engine was upgraded to 110 hp, and introduced a 120 hp (89 kW) 2.6-liter (4ZE1) I-TEC fuel-injected engine for the US market. In 1989, an optional General Motors 2.8-liter pushrod V6 borrowed from the Chevrolet S-10 pickup was also available. Later first-generation models offered an optional four-speed automatic transmission, with 4 cylinder vehicles fitted with an Aisin A340H and V6s a GM 4L30E. Models from 1988 to 1991 were equipped with live rear axles and four-wheel disc brakes.

Overseas model engines included the inline 4 Isuzu C223 (2,238 cc), C223T (a turbocharged version of the same) and in the late 1980s naturally aspirated and turbocharged 2.8-liter I-4 4JB1 diesels. In Japan, a limited series of 100 "Bighorn Irmscher R" models was offered, which received cosmetic and interior upgrades by the German tuning house Irmscher.

The turbocharged 2.8-liter originally produced 95 PS (70 kW), not much more than the 87 PS (64 kW) of the considerably smaller C223T due to new stricter emissions standards. Later versions with intercoolers fitted offered as much as 115 PS (85 kW).

In 1989 only, a short-wheelbase (90-inch) 2-door Isuzu Trooper was imported to the US market as the Trooper RS. All of these short wheelbase Troopers were equipped with 2.6-liter fuel-injected inline-four engines, 4.77:1 differential gears and 15×7-inch aluminium alloy "snowflake" pattern wheels. Automatic and manual transmissions were offered.

In Central America, Troopers were offered with removable roofs and a higher wheel clearance. Powertrain options included the Isuzu 2.8-liter turbo diesel. In Venezuela, the Trooper was known as Caribe 442. It was assembled locally to meet import restrictions in Venezuela; local parts content reached 35 percent by weight.

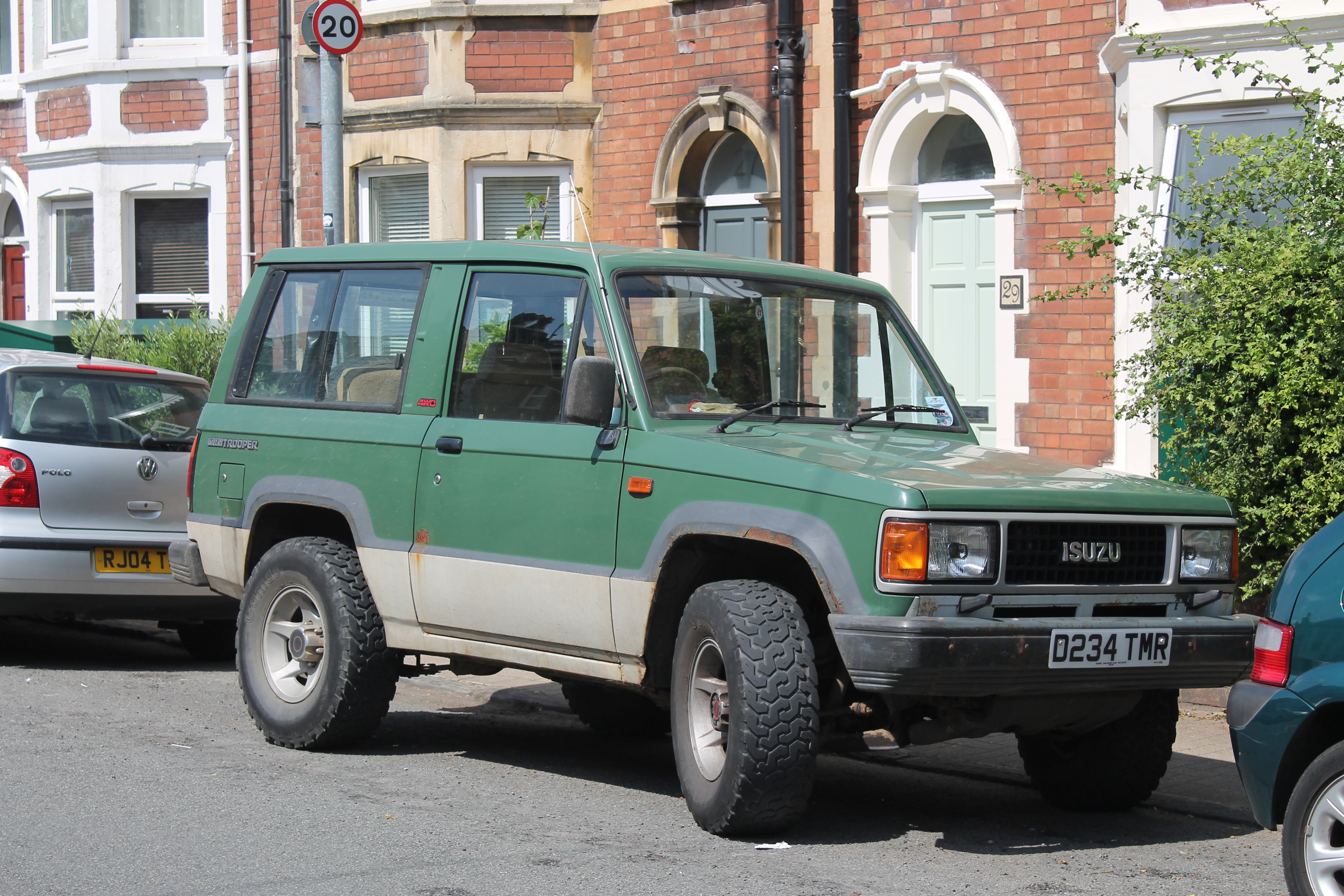
1987 Isuzu Trooper (UK)

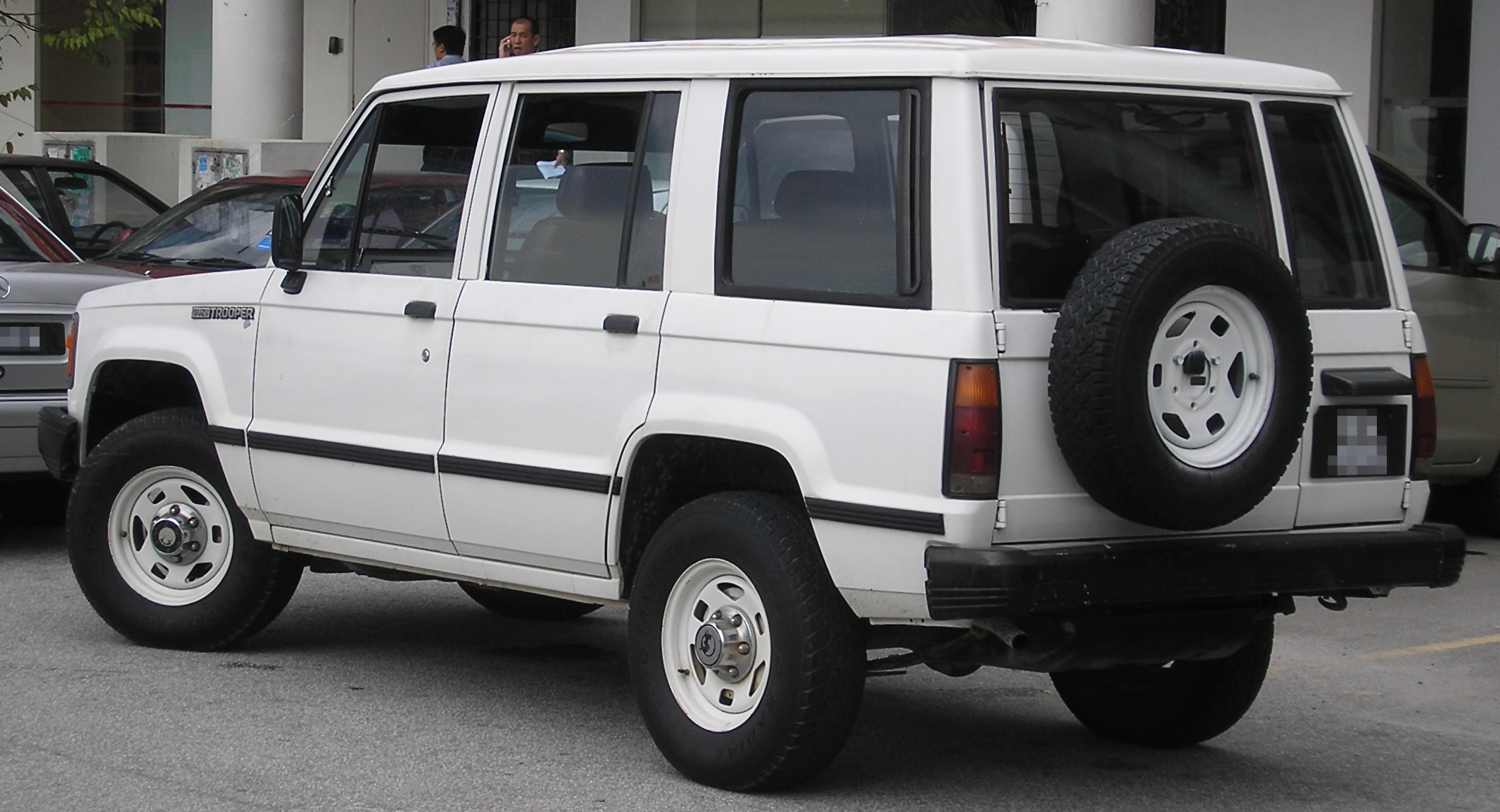
1988 Isuzu Trooper II (Malaysia)

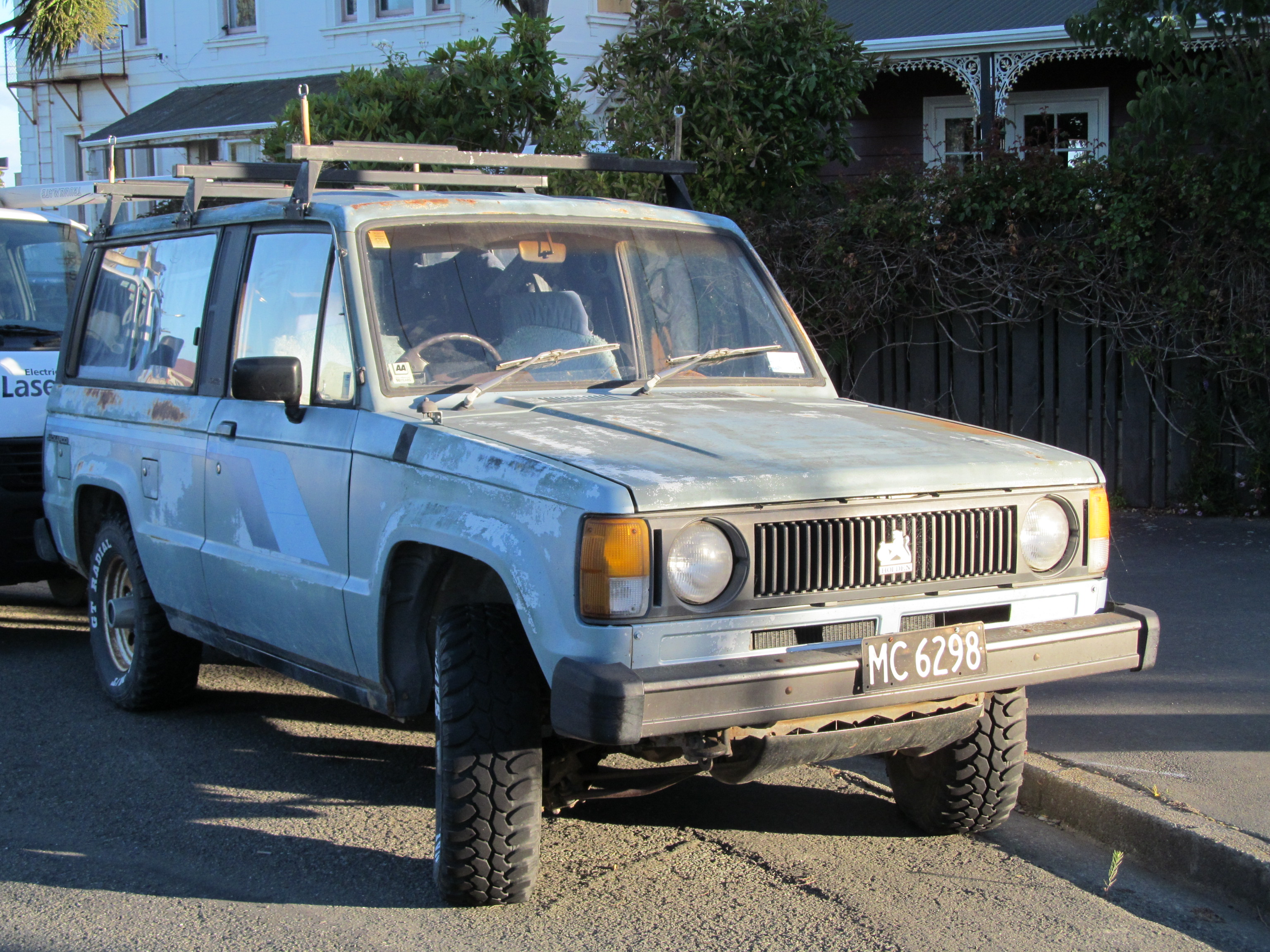
Holden Jackaroo (New Zealand)

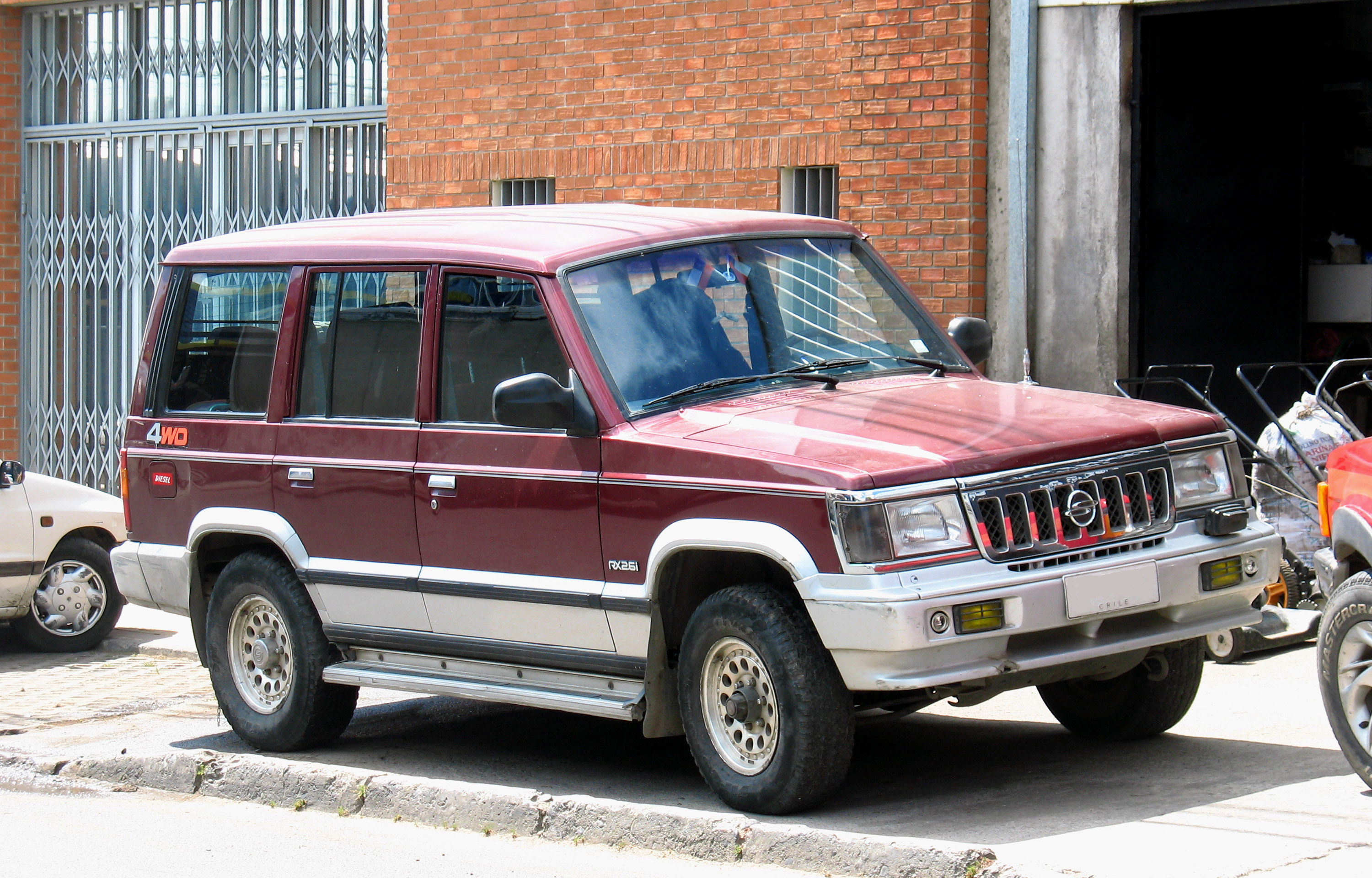
1994 Ssangyong Korando Family RX 2.6i

=== Badge engineered variants ===
==== Chevrolet Trooper ====
In Indonesia, where it was locally assembled by PT Garmak Motors, it was sold as the Chevrolet Trooper. Around 1987, a two-wheel-drive version called the Chevrolet Stallion was developed there; it has the Trooper's body on the chassis of a rear-wheel-drive Chevrolet LUV. It also has a rigid front axle instead of the Trooper's independent design. There was also a locally developed SUV model of the Isuzu Pickups built in the early 1980s called the Holden Lincah and Holden Raider. While similar to a Trooper in many ways it was a simpler vehicle and has bodywork partially made of fibreglass.

The Chevrolet Trooper name was also marketed in South America, except for Venezuela.

==== Holden Jackaroo ====
The Trooper was sold in Australia and New Zealand as the Holden Jackaroo, named after the Australian term for a young man working on a sheep or cattle station. The standard Trooper was also sold under the Isuzu nameplate in New Zealand only.

==== Subaru Bighorn ====
In November 1988, sales started for the Subaru Bighorn, which was only available with an Irmscher finish. It was only offered with Isuzu's 2.8-liter, inline four-cylinder turbodiesel engine with a four-speed automatic or five-speed manual transmission and part-time 4WD. Sales were stopped in February 1992.

==== SsangYong Korando Family ====
In November 1988, SsangYong Motors started licensed production of the Isuzu Trooper with their own bodywork and sold it as the Korando Family (Korean: 코란도 훼미리; RR: Kolando Hwemili). A concept model known as the KR-600 had first been shown in public at the Seoul International Trade Fair in 1984, after Keohwa Motors began plans to develop it in 1982. In 1984, Keohwa was taken over by Dong-A Motors who continued development until SsangYong took over in 1987 and went on to market the Korando Family under their own name. Korando means Korea Can Do or Korea Can Do It. Other meanings given include Korea Land Over and Korean Land Dominator.

It was primarily marketed in South Korea, Southeast Asia, some European countries, and to a lesser degree South America. In Europe it was originally sold simply as the SsangYong Family.

Initially, it used the Trooper's 2.2-liter diesel engine (Korean-built units being called "DC23" rather than C223), but in September 1991 the Peugeot 2.5-liter XD3P diesel engine became available. Isuzu's fuel injected 2.6-liter petrol engine was also installed, beginning in July 1991. Other changes included the addition of translucent headlamps and a chrome radiator grille. The KF had a 5-speed manual transmission.

The New Korando Family (Korean: 뉴 코란도는 훼미리; RR: Nyu Kolando Hwemili) was launched in August 1994. All previous engine options were replaced by a 2.3-liter Mercedes-Benz OM601 diesel engine.

The SsangYong Korando ("New Korando") was launched in July 1996, replacing the KF after it debuted at the 1995 Frankfurt Motor Show.

==== Mekong Star 4WD ====
The Mekong Star 4WD, sometimes known as Mekong Stars-4WD, was the first vehicle made by Mekong Auto in 1992, with diesel engine and drivetrain provided by Ssangyong. Assembly was done at the Cuu Long Factory in Ho Chi Minh City. Exports were supposedly made in 1993 to China and Japan.

By 1997, around 30,000 Mekong Stars had been produced. Production ended that year as the supply of necessary parts dried up after Ssangyong changed over to producing the New Korando.

== Second generation (1991) ==
Second generation
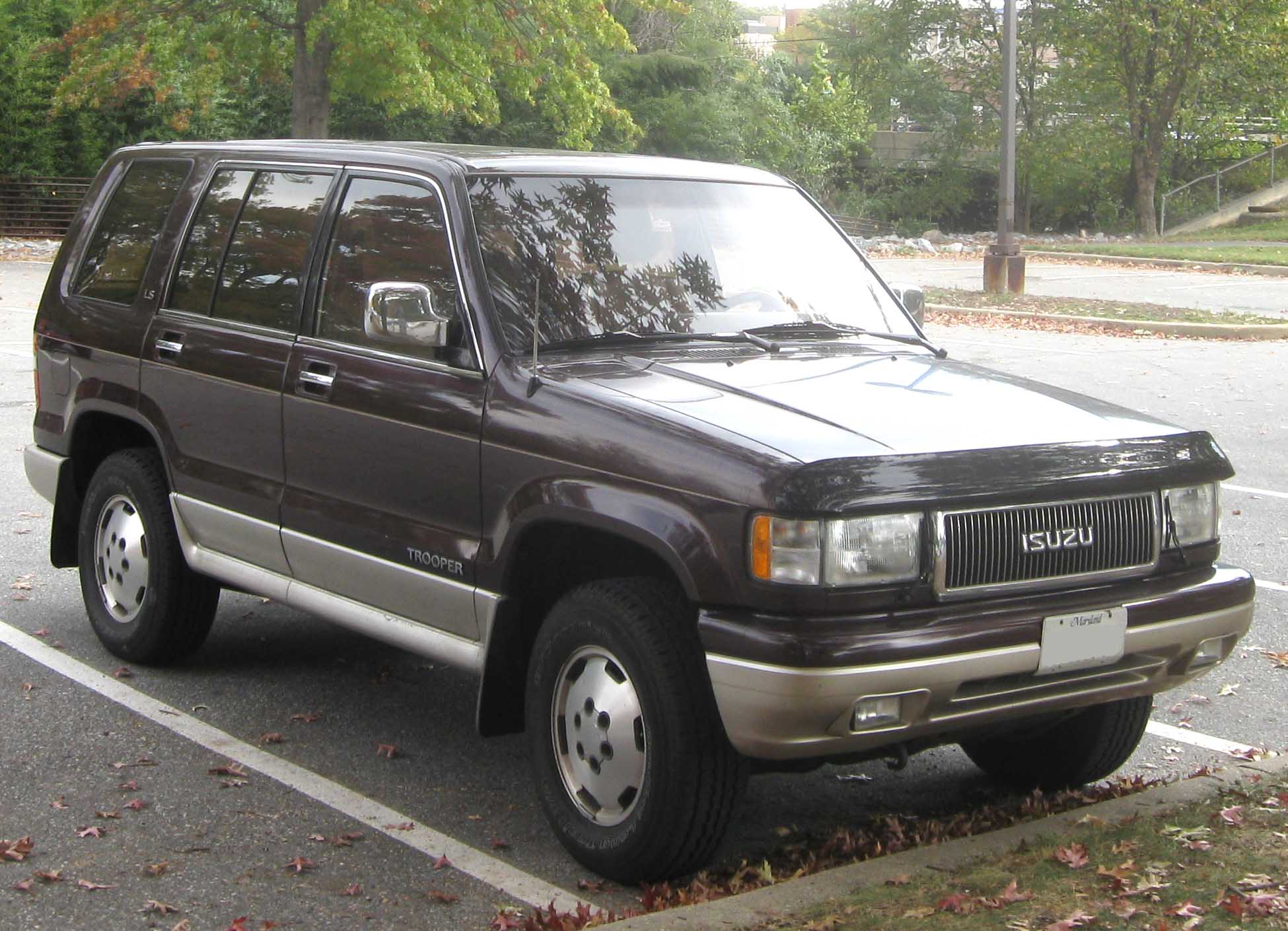

Overview
- Also called: Isuzu Bighorn; Isuzu Citation (Malaysia); Acura SLX (North America); Chevrolet Trooper; Holden Jackaroo; Holden Monterey; Honda Horizon (Japan); HSV Jackaroo (Australia); Opel Monterey; Sanjiu 3-Nine Trooper (China); Subaru Bighorn; Vauxhall Monterey
- Production: 1991–2002
- Assembly: Japan: Fujisawa (Isuzu Motors Fujisawa Plant); China: Zhanjiang (Zhanjiang Kingstar Vehicle Co., Ltd.); Malaysia: Pekan (Isuzu Hicom Malaysia Sdn Bhd); Philippines: Biñan (Isuzu Philippines); Taiwan: Xinzhuang District (Taiwan Isuzu Motors)

Body and chassis
- Body style: 3/5-door SUV
- Related: Isuzu VehiCROSS (short-wheelbase variant model)

Powertrain
- Engine: Petrol: 2.6 L 4ZE1 I4; 3.2 L 6VD1 V6; 3.2 L 6VD1 DOHC V6 (UBS25); 3.5 L 6VE1 DOHC V6 (UBS26); Diesel: 3.0 L 4JX1 turbo I4 (UBS73); 3.1 L 4JG2 turbo I4 (UBS69)
- Transmission: 4-speed automatic 5-speed manual

Dimensions
- Wheelbase: 3-door: 2,330 mm (91.7 in); 5-door: 2,760 mm (108.7 in)
- Length: 3-door: 4,230 mm (166.5 in); 5-door: 4,750 mm (187.0 in)
- Width: 1,745–1,835 mm (68.7–72.2 in)
- Height: 1,835–1,845 mm (72.2–72.6 in)

In December 1991 for the 1992 model year, Isuzu completely redesigned the Trooper to keep pace with changes in the SUV marketplace, making it larger, more powerful, and more luxurious. Originally only the long wheelbase, five-door model was on offer, but in March 1992 the shorter three-door model was added. These 4,155 lb (1,885 kg) vehicles used a 3.2 L 177 PS (130 kW; 175 hp) (SOHC) petrol engine or 3.2-liter dual overhead cam (DOHC) version rated at 193 PS (142 kW; 190 hp). A SOHC 3.2-liter engine producing 193 PS (142 kW; 190 hp) was introduced in 1996, replacing the earlier DOHC engine in selected export markets. Most models still used a part-time four-wheel-drive system, which required stopping the vehicle to engage and disengage the front axle. Starting in the 1996 model year, some Troopers came with a "shift-on-the-fly" engagement system.

The UBS series was also available with a pushrod overhead valve (OHV) 3.1-liter inline-four engine intercooled turbo diesel (designated "4JG2") producing 114 PS (84 kW; 112 hp) at 3,600 rpm, and 260 N⋅m (192 lb⋅ft) at 2,000 rpm. Japanese-market diesels have a claimed maximum power of 125 PS (92 kW; 123 hp) and 275 N⋅m (203 lb⋅ft) of torque at the same engine speeds. It was offered as a more rugged and fuel-efficient option for towing and heavy-duty operation, relative to the standard 3.2-liter petrol. The diesel-powered Jackaroo was available with a five-speed manual transmission and manual front hubs only coupled to a part-time four-wheel drive system with open front and limited-slip rear differentials. The 3.2-liter V6 petrol engine version was also available with an optional four-speed automatic transmission with automatic locking front hubs. The same diesel engine was also available in the UK and other markets with a belt-driven overhead camshaft, which developed slightly more power. After 1998, and the introduction of the "4JX1" 3.0-liter diesel engine, a four-speed automatic transmission was made available in addition to the five-speed manual transmission.

Around the same period, General Motors, Isuzu and Honda established a working relationship. Under this partnership, the Trooper was thus sold in Japan as the Honda Horizon (1994 to 1999), in Europe as the Opel Monterey, in the United Kingdom as the Vauxhall Monterey (1994–1998), in Australia as the Holden Jackaroo (1998–2002), and in the United States as the Acura SLX (1996 to 1999). The Trooper received a mid-life facelift in 1998 with new grille, bumper, headlamps, and front fenders. The rear received a body-colored, hard spare-tire cover.

The 1998 Australasian and US-spec Trooper became equipped with the DOHC 3.5-liter engine from the Isuzu/Holden Rodeo producing 215 hp (160 kW; 218 PS). European and Asian buyers could opt for the diesel engine option of the 4JG2 3.1-liter (later superseded by the 4JX1 3.0-liter of 159 PS or 117 kW). A Borg-Warner torque-on-demand ("TOD") all-wheel-drive system was introduced, along with freshened styling. The grille was redesigned again for the 2000 model year.

Transmission options included a five-speed manual transmission, the Aisin AR5 and the electronically controlled 4L30E four-speed automatic. The 4L30E was fitted with both a "power" shift feature allowing the gearbox to take better advantage of the engine's power by adjusting the shifting nature and a "winter" mode permitting third gear starts for added stability in slippery conditions. The 2000 to 2002 Trooper included a feature called "Grade Logic" which allowed the transmission to automatically downshift on steep grades in order to slow the vehicle down.

The suspension consisted of a fully independent torsion bar front suspension, and a multilink coil sprung rear suspension integrated with a solid rear axle.

While US-spec Troopers came only equipped with five seats, elsewhere in the world a seven-seater version was also offered. Optional on all models was a rear limited-slip differential. In the US the three-door RS model was sold only from 1993 to 1995. The Trooper LS and S models offered 117.8 cu ft (3,340 L) cargo space, while Limited models had 112.3 cu ft (3,180 L).

In 2002, the Trooper was discontinued in the United States in favor of the smaller Axiom and the larger GM-produced Isuzu Ascender, a rebadged GMC Envoy. In Japan, the last Bighorn was built in September 2002 as Isuzu withdrew from manufacturing their own passenger cars.

In April 2004, New Zealand issued recalls for Isuzu Troopers manufactured in 1992 and 1995 due to the warning from the National Highway Traffic Safety Administration that the SUV's accelerator can stick.

A Trooper with the 16-valve 159 PS (117 kW; 157 hp) 3.0-liter 4JX1-TC engine was sold in the Philippines from 2002 to 2005. Known as the Skyroof Edition, it came in a rear-wheel-drive configuration with anti-lock brakes, a limited-slip differential, billet-type radiator grille, and large power moonroof. Other standard options included leather seats, wood trim, and a VCD entertainment system. It was later succeeded by the Isuzu Alterra.

=== Gallery ===
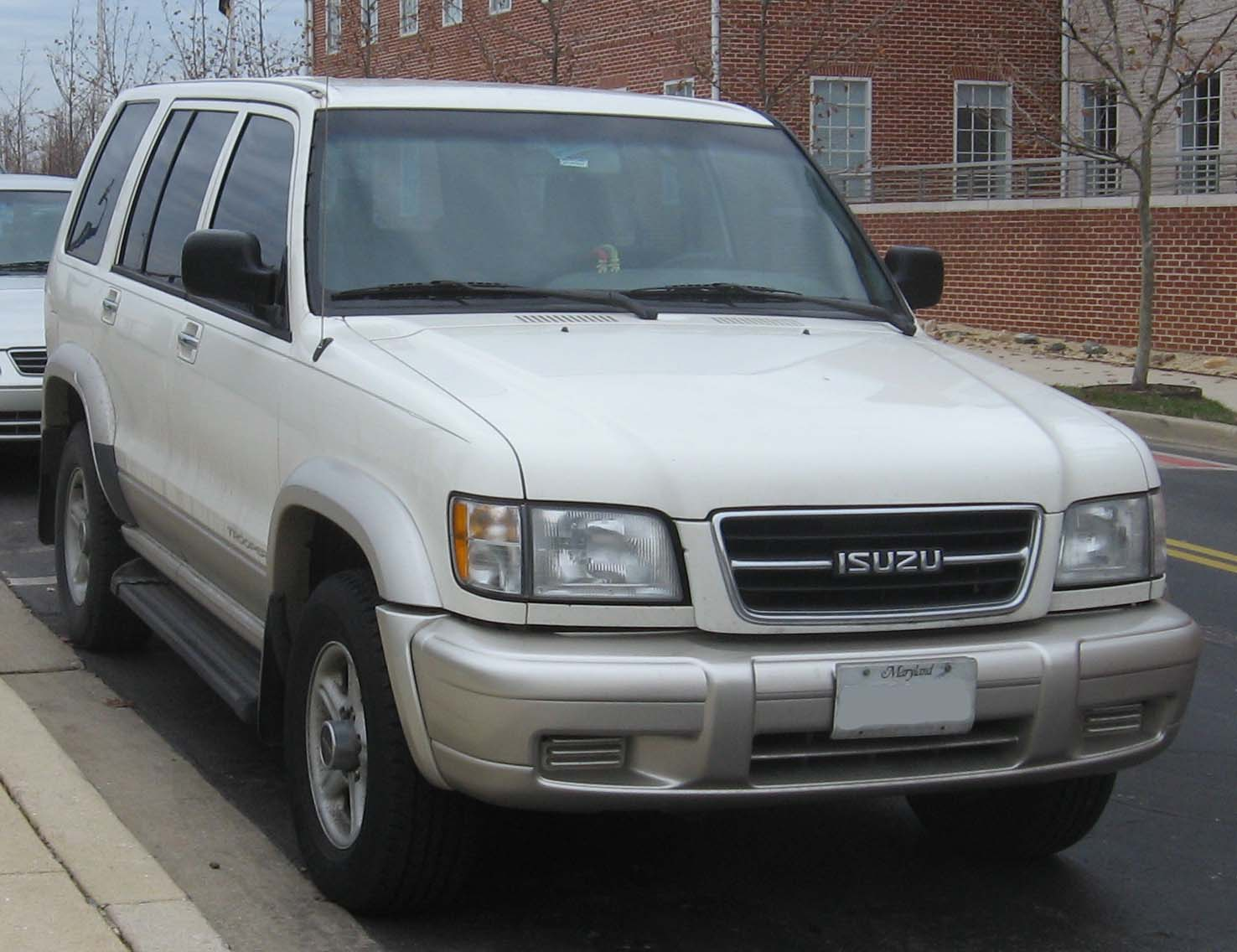
1998–1999 Isuzu Trooper

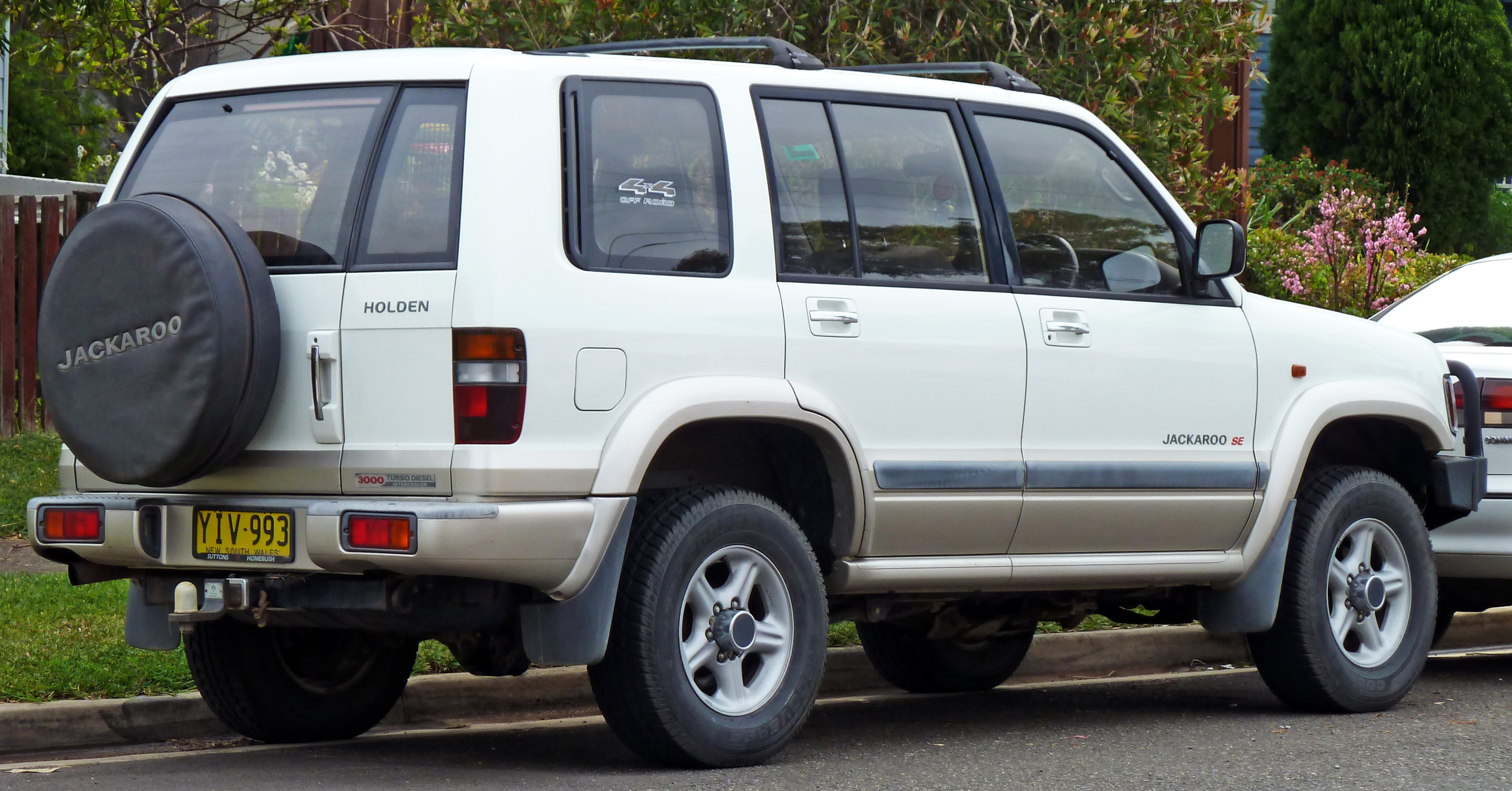
2001–2003 Holden Jackaroo (UBS) SE 5-door (Australia)

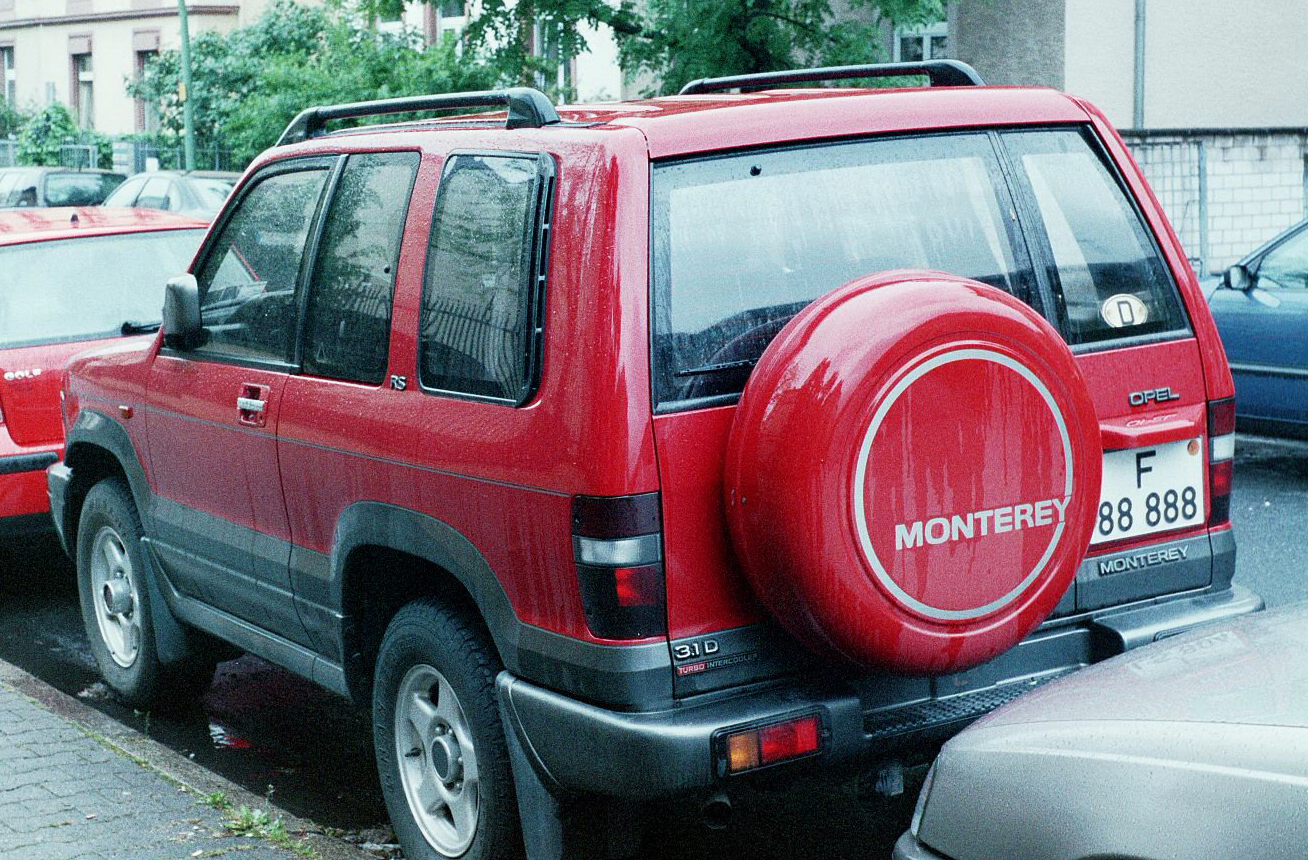
1992–1998 Opel Monterey RS 3-door (Germany)

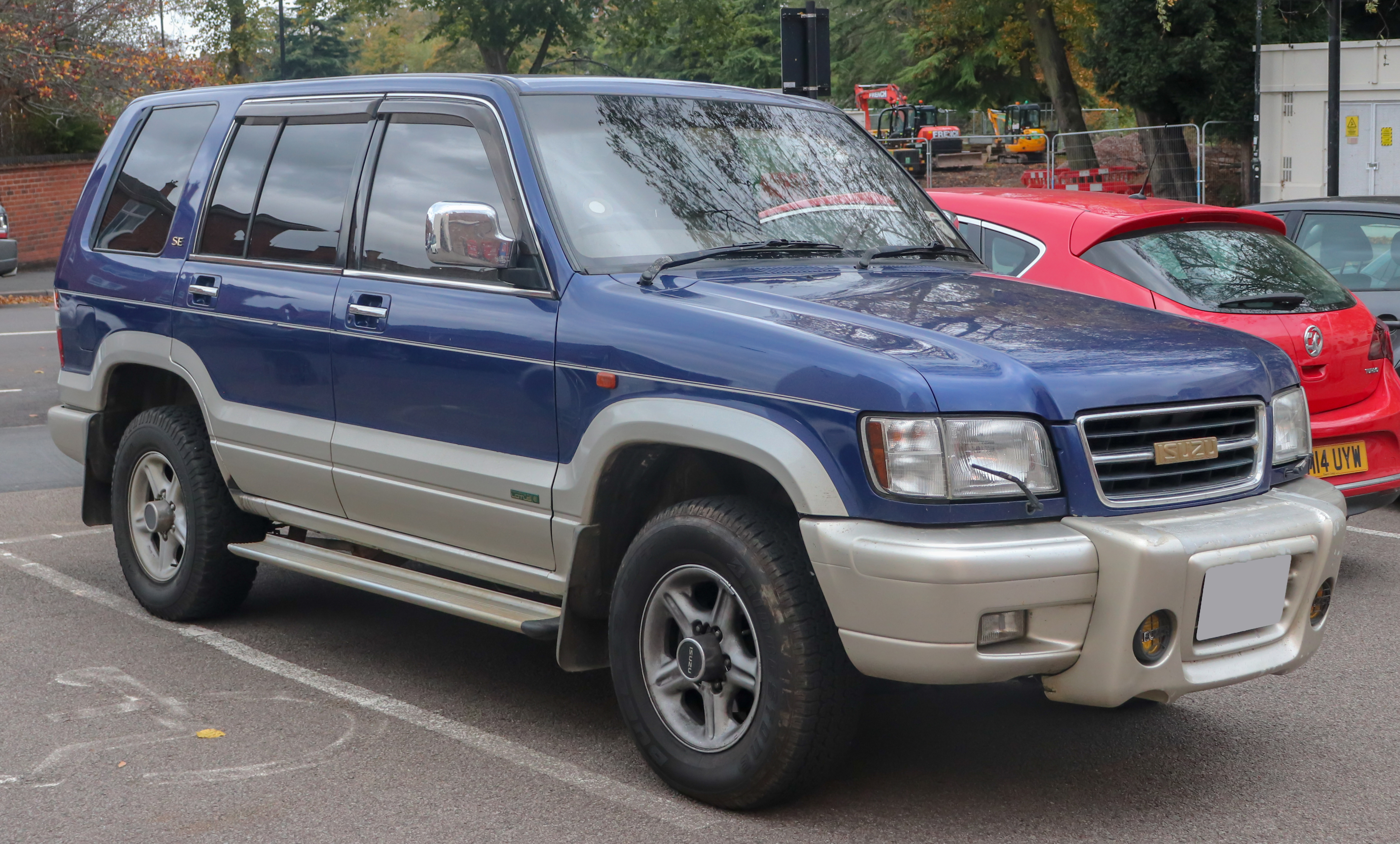
1999 Isuzu Bighorn (JDM)

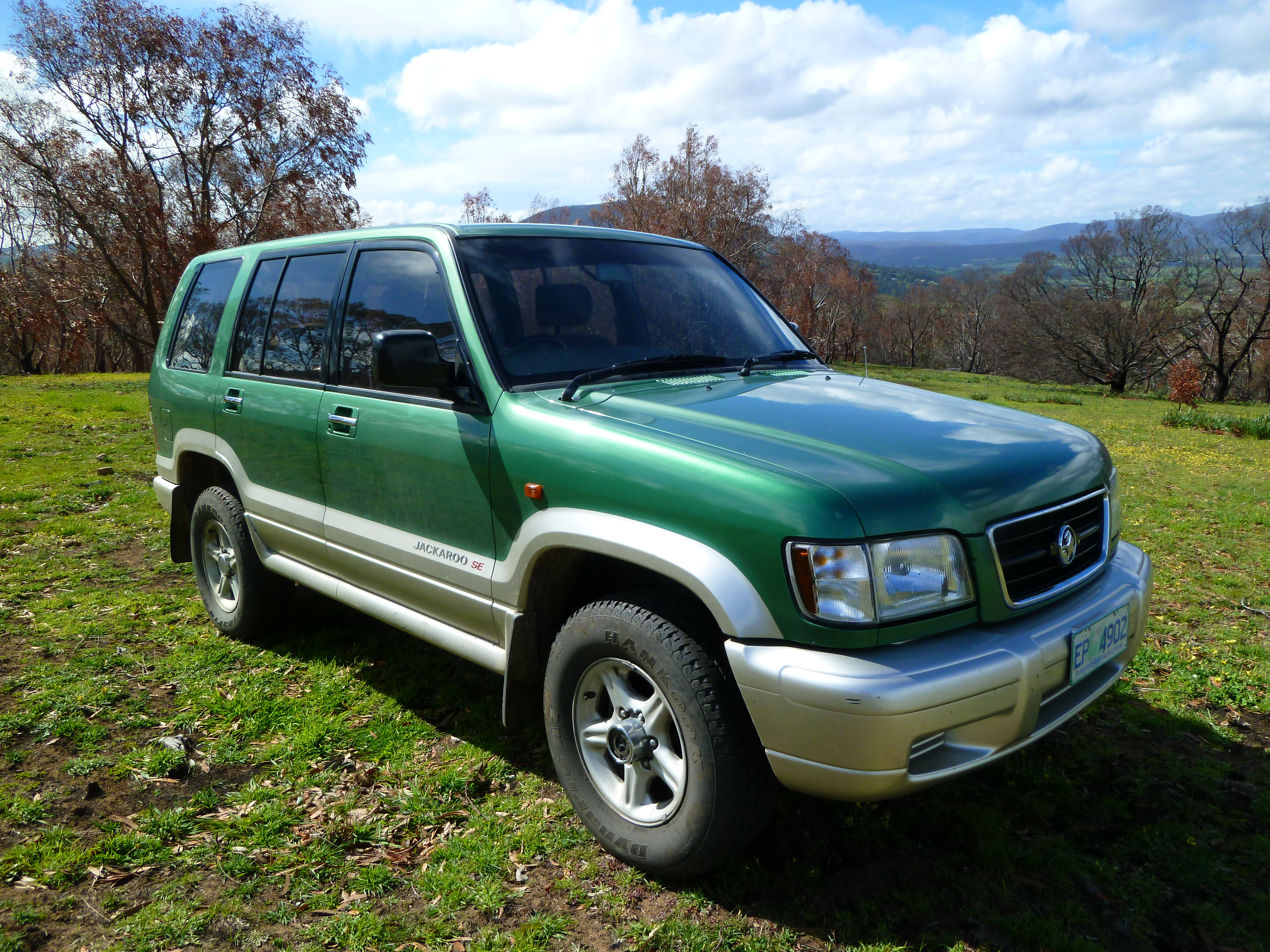
1998–2001 Holden Jackaroo SE 5-door

=== Badge engineered versions ===
==== Acura SLX ====
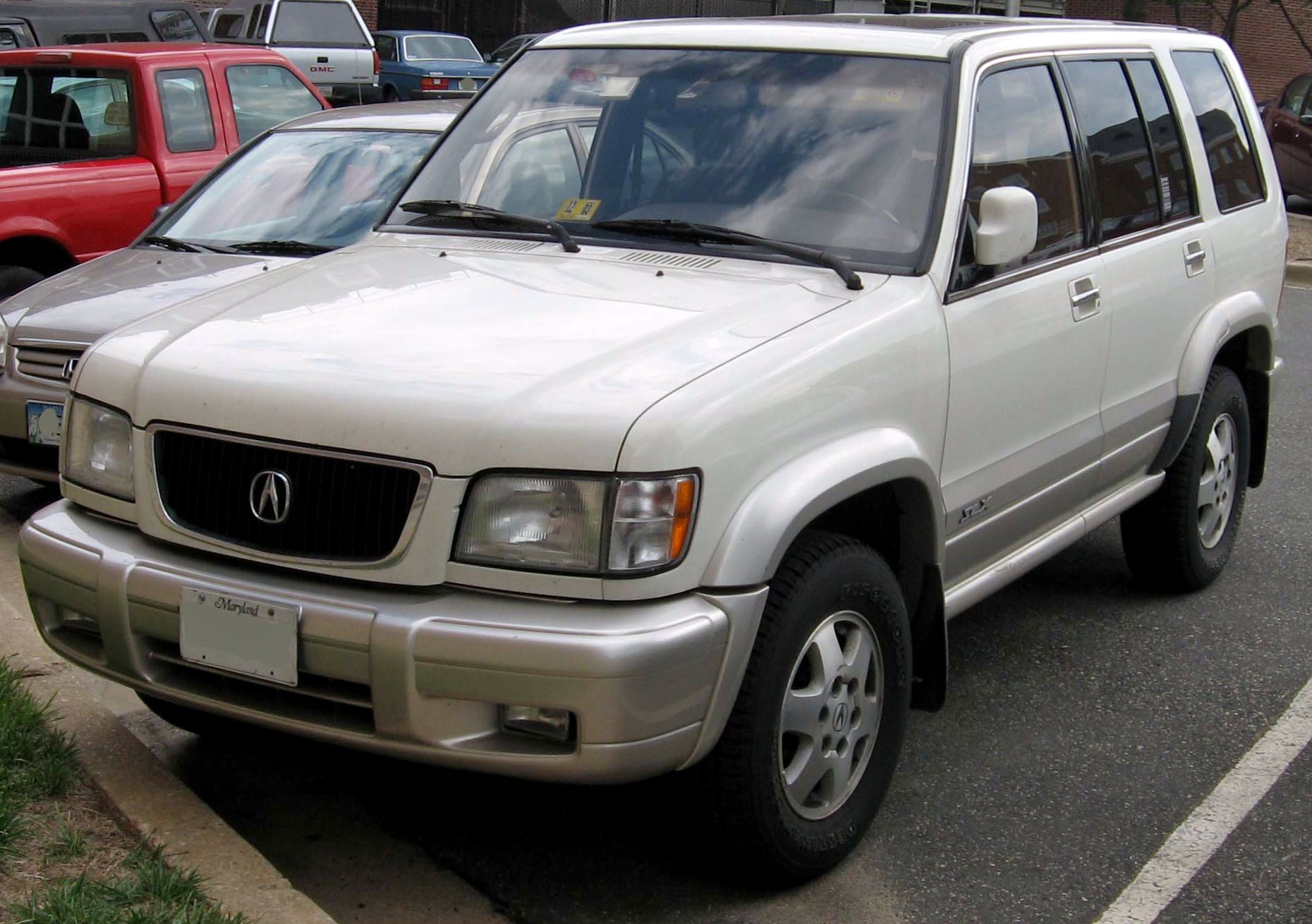
1998–1999 Acura SLX

The Acura SLX was a lightly upgraded and rebadged Isuzu Trooper sold by the Acura division of Honda from 1995 to 1999, as 1996 to 1999 year models. Sold only in the United States, the SLX was later replaced by the Acura MDX in 2001.

The SLX omitted some of the options available on Troopers from concurrent model years, including the manual transmission and certain engines. From 1996 to 1997 the SLX was only available with the 3.2-liter SOHC or DOHC V6 engine, switching to the new 3.5-liter DOHC V6 engine in 1998. The SLX received a restyled front end for the 1998 model year, but continued to sell poorly and was ultimately discontinued after 1999. It is said that sales were affected by bad press when the 1996 to 1997 models were rated "Not Acceptable" by Consumer Reports for their tendency to roll over during testing (see Rollover Controversy, below). Autotrader says it has a 3-star safety rating (Front and Passenger) and the base entry price was $36,300.

On December 5, 2019, Acura presented a 1997 SLX outfitted with a modern turbo, four-cylinder engine, 10-speed automatic transmission and an SH-AWD system used by the RDX. It was placed on display at the Radwood show in Orange County, California.

==== Holden Jackaroo/Monterey ====
The Australian version of the UBS-series was sold as the Holden Jackaroo/Monterey. Originally known as the Jackaroo, Holden introduced the "Monterey" as the top equipment level (V6 only) in 1994. Later, Holden Monterey became a standalone name for the more luxurious part of the range. In July 1993, Holden Special Vehicles launched the sporting HSV Jackaroo model, followed by a second HSV run under the Jackaroo SE badge. 79 of the HSV Jackaroo were built, followed by 234 of the Jackaroo SE. Both were cosmetic upgrades to the Holden donor and powered by the same 3.2-liter 177 PS (130 kW; 175 hp) (SOHC) petrol engine. The Jackaroo SE had the HSV badging optional.

Holden issued recall orders for the Jackaroo and Monterey due to bad earthing connections within the main engine wiring harness, which would lead to an unintentional increase in speed if the engine was left idle.

==== V8 HSV Jackaroo ====
In 1996, HSV briefly explored the idea of fitting a Holden 5.0L V8 engine into both the Jackaroo and the Rodeo, but this concept was abandoned due to concerns that it would negatively impact sales of the SS Commodore. The project did not progress beyond early discussions.

==== Holden Jack8 Concept ====
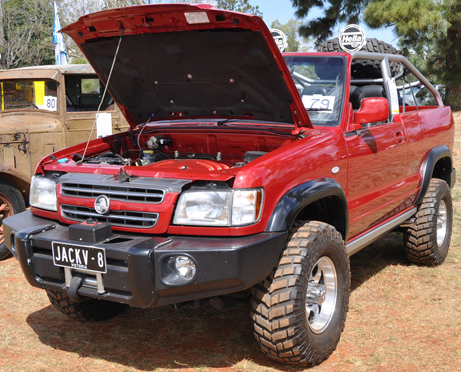
Holden Jack8 Concept

The 2001 Holden Jack8 concept was an innovative reinterpretation of the Jackaroo 4x4, created to reinvigorate interest in the aging model as it marked its twentieth anniversary in the Australian market. The concept debuted at the National 4x4 Show in Melbourne and featured dramatic modifications, including a removed roof, extended front doors, and a heavily modified rear end. The design drew inspiration from V8 desert racing rigs, with the vehicle receiving a 50mm body lift, heavy-duty suspension, and a Gen III 5.7L V8 engine.

The Jack8 was equipped with custom wheels, a reinforced roll cage, side-exit exhausts, and a range of other off-road modifications, including Mickey Thompson Baja Claw tyres and a heavy-duty suspension system. Inside, it featured Monaro-style bucket seats, a high-end audio system, and advanced GPS technology.

Although it was a running, driving concept and even registered in Victoria, the Jack8 did not significantly boost Jackaroo sales. The Jackaroo was discontinued in 2003, replaced by the Commodore-based AWD Adventra. Despite this, the Jack8 remains a symbol of Holden's design ambitions and was recently preserved in the Holden Heritage Collection.

==== Honda Horizon ====
The Honda Horizon was retailed in Japan with either a 3.2-liter V6 gasoline engine or a 3.1-liter turbo diesel engine. On March 19, 1998, the Horizon (and the Bighorn/Trooper) was updated to a direct-injection 3.0-liter engine with 160 PS (118 kW), equipped for low noise and cleaner exhaust.

It was sold from 1994 to 1999. The difference between the Horizon and the Trooper/Big Horn was the use of a 5-door body instead of a 3-door body instead of changes on the logo and grille. The grades consist of Lotus and SE.

==== Opel/Vauxhall Monterey ====
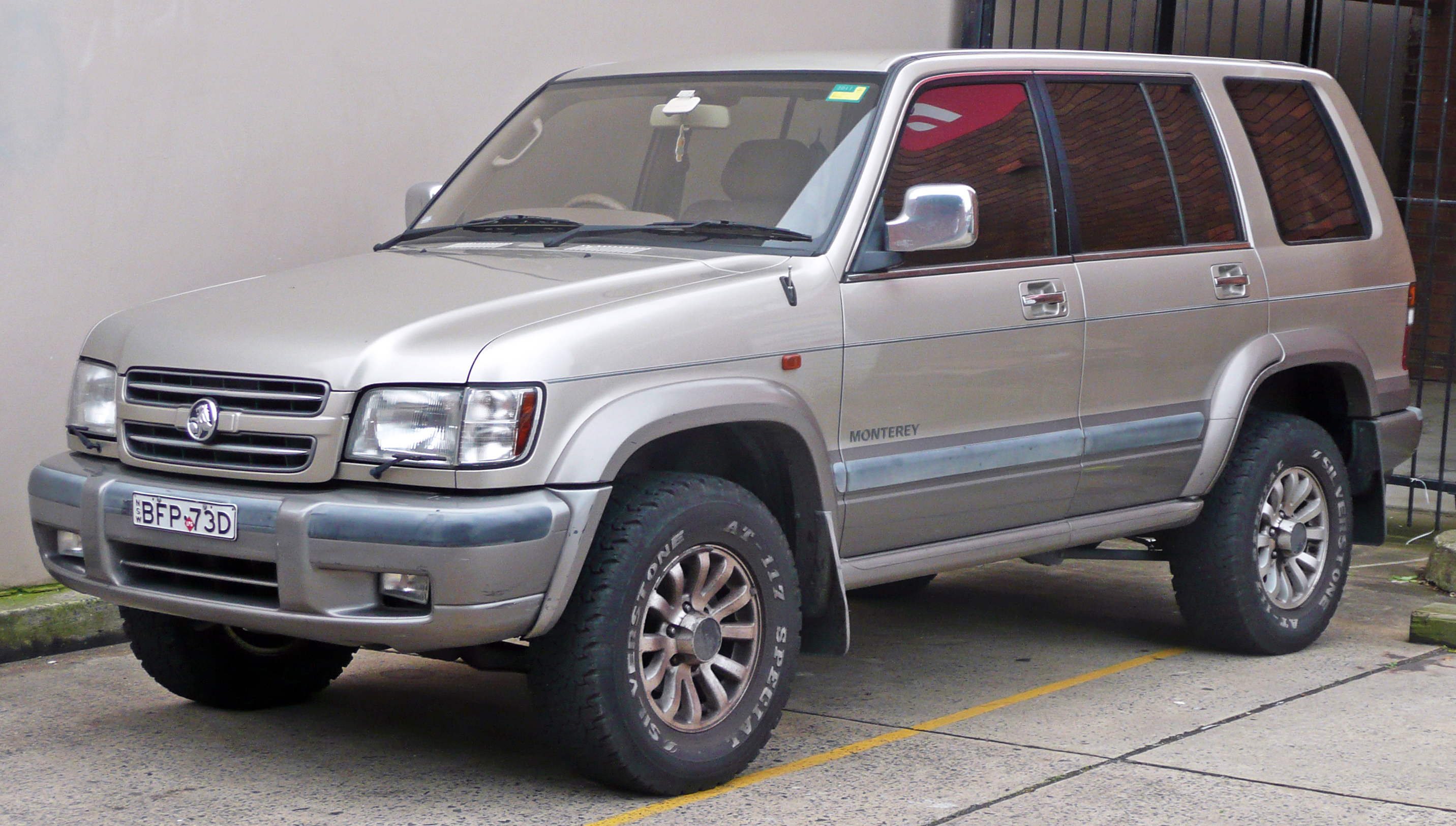
2001–2003 Holden Monterey (Australia)

In Europe, the Trooper/Big Horn was sold as the Opel Monterey from 1992 to 1999. It received a light facelift for 1996, now with a honeycomb grille rather than the original design with vertical elements. Twin airbags were also new. The Monterey underwent a more thorough facelift and diesel engine changes for 1998, same as for the Trooper/Bighorn elsewhere. The Monterey nameplate lasted until 1999, after which sales were picked up by Isuzu's dealership network as the Trooper. The Trooper remained on sale in Europe until 2003.

From 1994 to 1998, the Trooper/Big Horn was sold in the UK as the Vauxhall Monterey, but with no other changes. However, it was not a strong seller and was withdrawn from sale a year before the Opel version.

==== Subaru Bighorn ====
In 1992, Subaru sold the Subaru Bighorn with a 3.2-liter V6 gasoline engine and a 3.1-liter, inline-four cylinder turbodiesel engine made available with a four-speed automatic or five-speed manual transmission. In mid-1994, Subaru discontinued further sales since the OEM contract signed by Subaru and Isuzu was expiring. The only model available was the "Long Handling by Lotus", with either a four-speed automatic transmission or a five-speed manual (turbodiesel only). Subaru reported the transmission was worked on with the assistance of Lotus.

=== Rollover controversy ===
The second-generation Trooper received negative press in the United States when the 1995–1997 models were rated "Not Acceptable" by Consumer Reports for an alleged tendency to roll over under testing.

In response to a petition from the publication's publisher, Consumers Union, the National Highway Traffic Administration conducted its own tests and found no issue that could lead to a need for a recall. However, Isuzu suggested that the magazine's claims had hurt sales of the vehicle.

After the release of the NHTSA report, Isuzu filed a lawsuit against Consumers Union seeking $242 million in damages, claiming that during Consumer Reports's tests the steering wheel had been twisted more sharply than "a driver is willing or able to make in response to an unexpected event."

The judge in the suit, Richard Paez, determined that because Isuzu had engaged in an extensive public relations campaign to refute the claims prior to filing suit, it was considered a public figure, raising the standard for defamation from a simple preponderance of evidence that the report was false to "clear and convincing evidence" that Consumer Reports published the article knowing it was false or with reckless disregard for whether it was true or false.

The defamation suit went to a jury, which found that eight of the 17 statements in the report questioned by Isuzu were false, with one displaying "reckless disregard" for the truth on the part of Consumer Reports magazine, but that Isuzu was not damaged by that statement. Two of the ten jurors on the panel did not believe the magazine believed that the other seven statements were untruthful when they published them. Consequently, the full jury panel did not award Isuzu monetary damages for the alleged damage to its reputation and lost sales.

Isuzu calculated the total cost of the Consumer Reports claims at $244 million. As Isuzu was denied damages on all counts, the formal court judgement in favor of Consumers Union entered by Paez required Isuzu to pay CU's "reasonable costs" of defending itself against the suit, not including attorney's fees.

== Motorsport ==
- 1989: Jackaroo SWB won the Marathon class victory in '89 Australian Safari driven by Peter Lockhart.
- 1992: Trooper won class victory in '92 Australian Safari.
- 1993: Troopers took first and second place in the class of '93 Australian Safari.
- 1994: Trooper won the Marathon class victory at the 1994 Paris–Dakar Rally, and finished 12th overall.
- 1994: Trooper finished first in its class at the Photographs Rally.
- 1995–1997: The Holden Jackaroo served as the official Safety Car for the Bathurst 1000, a decision that surprised many due to its off-road nature. However, its high vantage point and stable handling made it well-suited for controlling race pace under caution conditions.
- 1996: Holden Jackaroo finished first place – Driven by Bruce Garland Australian Safari
- 1998: Holden Jackaroo Finished 1st and 2nd in the Round Australia Trial known as the Playstation Rally. First place driven by Wayne Webster/Harry Suzuki, and second, Peter Brock. Brock competed in the Production class racing a showroom condition Holden Jackaroo finishing first in the Production class.
- 1999: Holden Jackaroo finished first place – Driven by Bruce Garland Australian Safari
- 2000: Holden Jackaroo finished first place – Driven by Bruce Garland Australian Safari
- 2001: Holden Jackaroo finished first place – Driven by Bruce Garland Australian Safari
- 2002: Holden Jackaroo finished first place – Driven by Bruce Garland/Harry Suzuki Australian Safari

== Naming conventions ==
- North America – Isuzu Trooper II (1983–1991), Isuzu Trooper (1991–2002), also sold by Honda as the Acura SLX from 1996 to 2000
- South America and Africa – Isuzu Trooper and Chevrolet Trooper
- Colombia – Chevrolet Trooper (First Generation), Chevrolet Trooper 960 (Second generation)
- Venezuela – Caribe 442
- Asia – Isuzu Trooper, also sold by Chevrolet as Chevrolet Trooper
- Japan – Isuzu Bighorn, Subaru Bighorn, sold by Honda as Honda Horizon (similar to the 1995–1999 Acura SLX, introduced in 1994, discontinued in 1999)
- Europe – Isuzu Trooper (1st and 2nd Generation) and Vauxhall Monterey (UK, 1992–1998), Opel Monterey (the rest of Europe and Ireland, 1992–1999)
- New Zealand – Isuzu Bighorn, Isuzu Trooper, Holden Jackaroo, Holden Monterey
- Australia – Holden Jackaroo, Holden Monterey and Holden Special Vehicles Jackaroo
