= Ford Falcon (ED) =

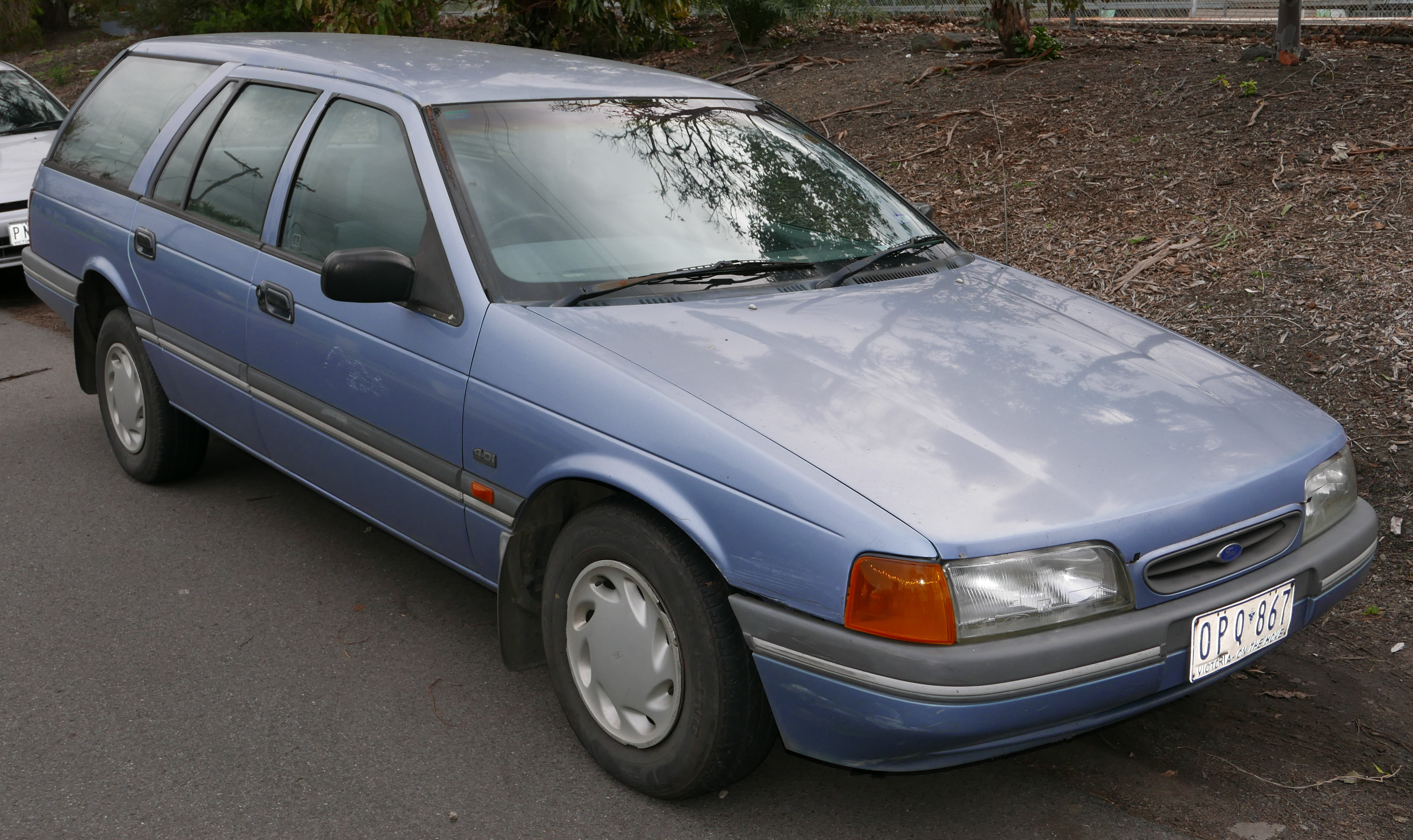
- Ford Falcon GLi wagon

Overview
- Manufacturer: Ford Australia
- Also called: Ford Fairmont (ED)
- Production: August 1993 – August 1994
- Assembly: Australia: Melbourne, Victoria (Broadmeadows)

Body and chassis
- Class: Full-size car
- Body style: 4-door sedan 5-door wagon

Powertrain
- Engine: 4.0 L Ford I6 (petrol); 5.0 L Windsor V8 (petrol)
- Transmission: 4-speed M91LE automatic (I6); 4-speed M95LE automatic (V8); 5-speed manual

Dimensions
- Wheelbase: Sedan: 2,794 mm (110.0 in)
- Length: Sedan: 4,811 mm (189.4 in); Wagon: 5,003 mm (197.0 in)
- Width: 1,857 mm (73.1 in)
- Height: 1,399 mm (55.1 in)
- Kerb weight: 1,484 kg (3,271.7 lb) (GLi); 1,584 kg (3,492.1 lb) (XR8 Sprint)

Chronology
- Predecessor: Ford Falcon (EB)
- Successor: Ford Falcon (EF)

The Ford Falcon (ED) is a full-size car that was produced by Ford Australia from 1993 to 1994. It was the third iteration of the fifth generation of the Falcon and also included the Ford Fairmont (ED)—the luxury-oriented version.

== Introduction ==
The Ford ED Falcon was introduced in August 1993, replacing the Ford EB Falcon, which had been released in July 1991. Although over 280 changes were made for the new model, the most obvious visual difference was a new oval shaped grille. Falcon XR6 and Falcon XR8 models now featured a unique four headlight frontal treatment. It launched shortly after the Holden VR Commodore.

== Model range ==
The ED Falcon was offered in four-door sedan and five-door wagon body styles in the following models:

- Falcon GLi sedan and wagon
- Falcon Futura sedan and wagon
- Falcon XR6 sedan and wagon
- Falcon XR8 sedan
- Fairmont sedan and wagon
- Fairmont Ghia sedan

The ED Falcon range starts with the GLi, a fleet oriented model. GLi models were offered in both sedan and wagon forms and had the option of either a 4.0-litre SOHC straight six with 148 kW (198 hp), or 5.0-litre OHV push-rod V8 with 165 kW (221 hp). Each GLi had 14-inch steel wheels with wheel covers. Standard features included power steering, adjustable steering column, remote boot lid release, smart-lock remote keyless entry and immobilisation system, AM/FM radio/cassette and plastic fuel tank. GLi models were identified by the dark grey door handles, grille, mirrors and bumper inserts.

The Futura name plate was brought back replacing the "Falcon S" trim. Features the Futura offered over the GLi included body coloured door handles and mirrors, availability of Black Pearl paintwork, demand wash-wipe feature on windscreen wipers (demand wipe only on GLi), ABS brakes, cruise control, full instrumentation pack (four ancillary gauges plus tachometer) with volt meter and oil pressure gauge, digital clock, lamps for ignition lock and map reading, eight-speaker Alpine sound system, carpeted door map pockets on front doors only, full cloth trim. Futura models shared the same engine and transmission options as the GLi with the exceptions of there being no manual transmission and no V8 option on the wagon. It appeared at the same time as the similar Holden Commodore Acclaim.

Options on the base models included the choice of 15- or 16-inch (only available with sport suspension package) alloy wheels, sunroof, rear spoiler, cruise controls (GLi), trip computer, cabin fitted hand held fire-extinguisher, smart-lock integrated car alarm and air conditioning.

The Fairmont duo represented the luxury variants of this Falcon series, whilst the XR models were the sports variants.

Limited editions comprised:

- Falcon Classic
- Falcon XR8 Sprint

Higher specification models had higher output versions of the 4.0-litre six with 161 kW (216 hp) and 5.0-litre 165 kW (221 hp) V8.

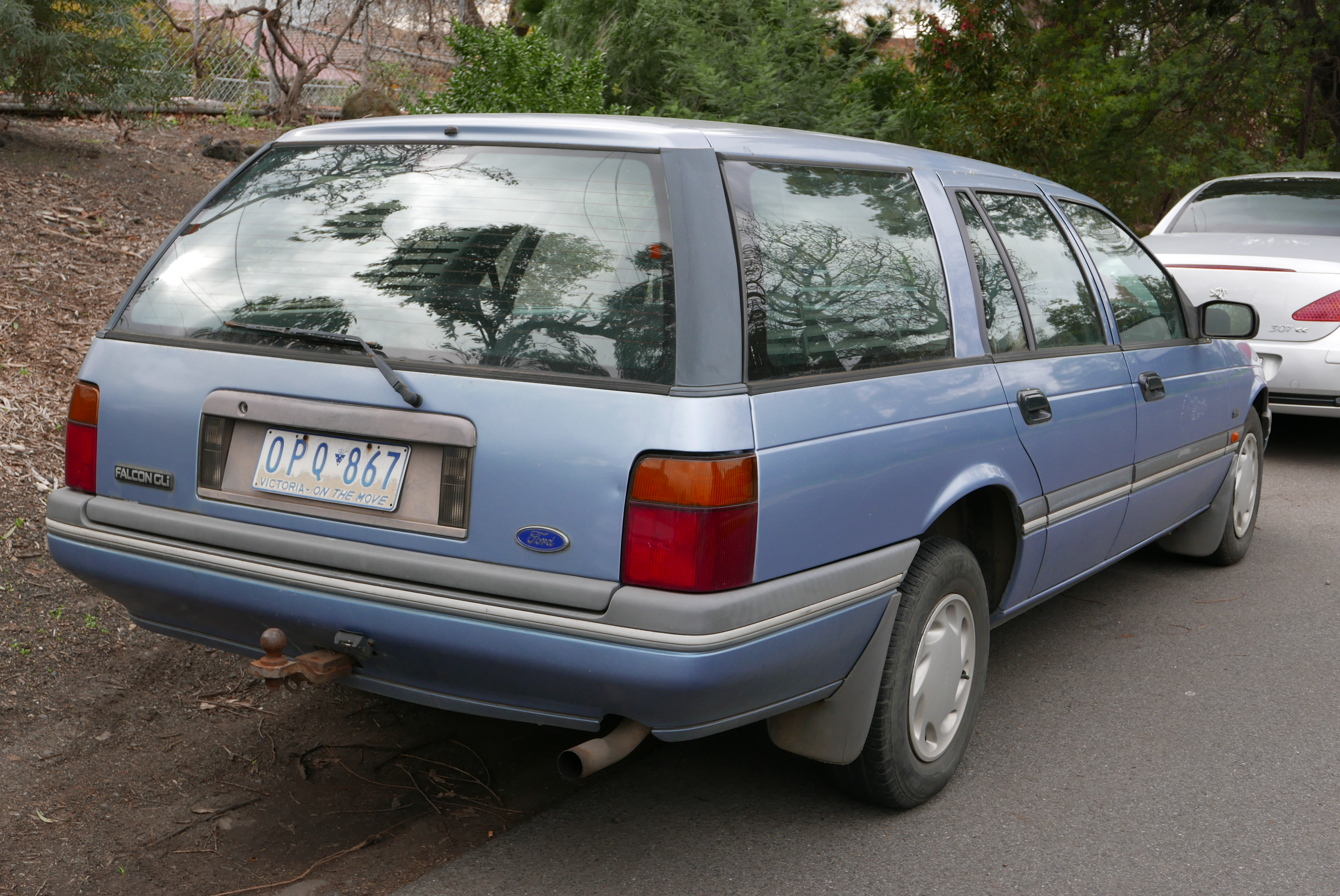
Falcon GLi wagon

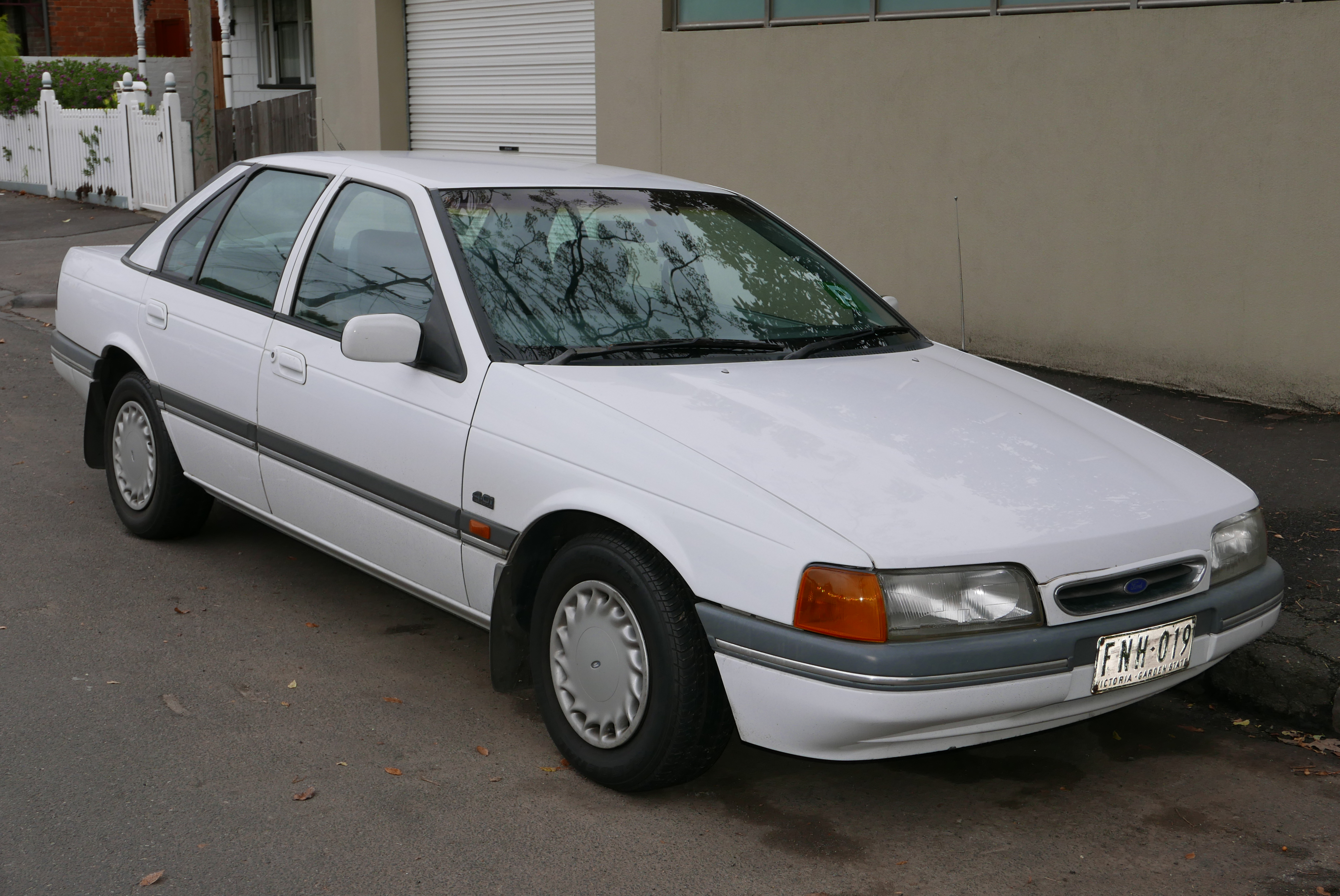
Falcon Futura sedan

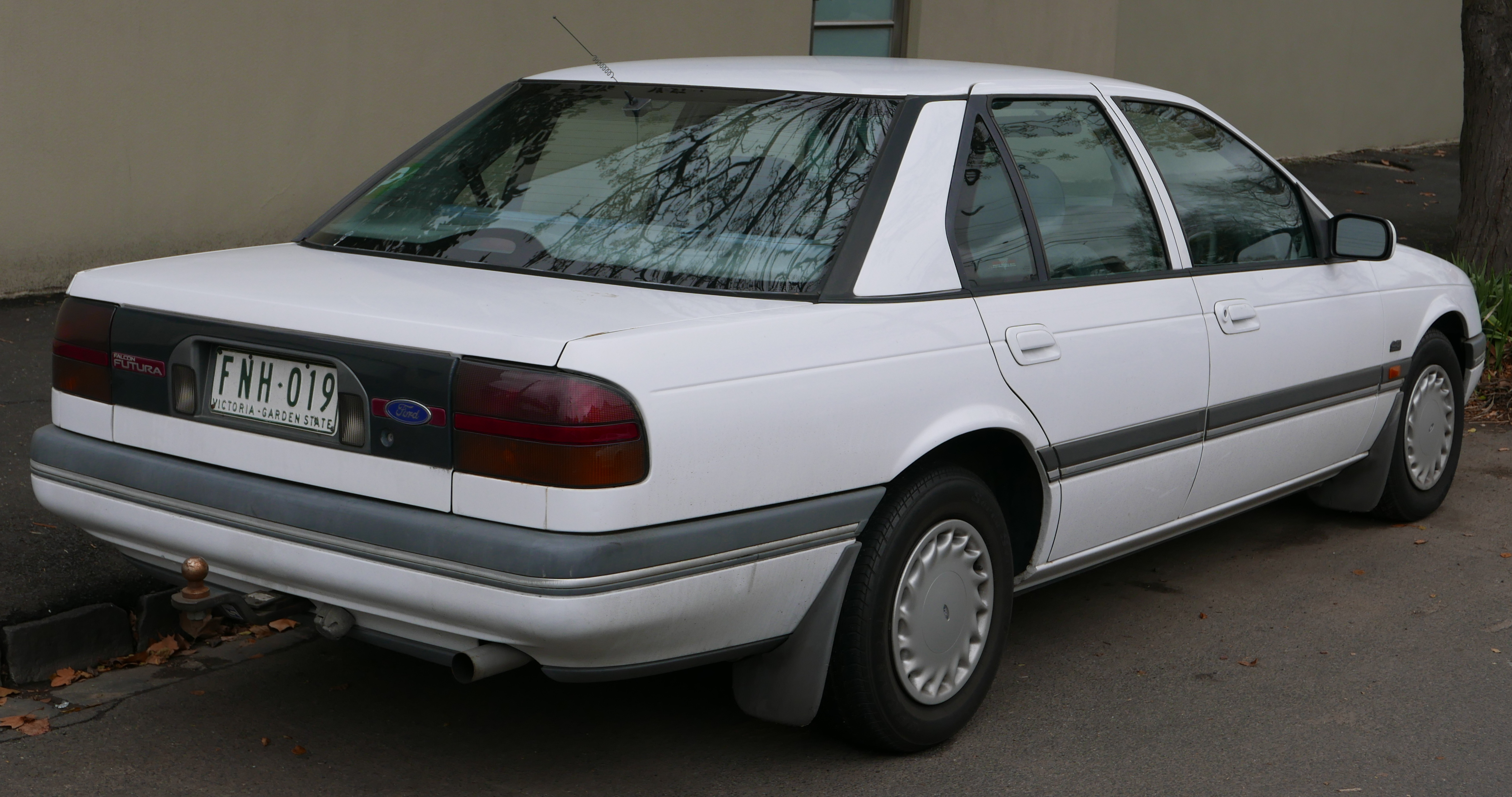
Falcon Futura sedan

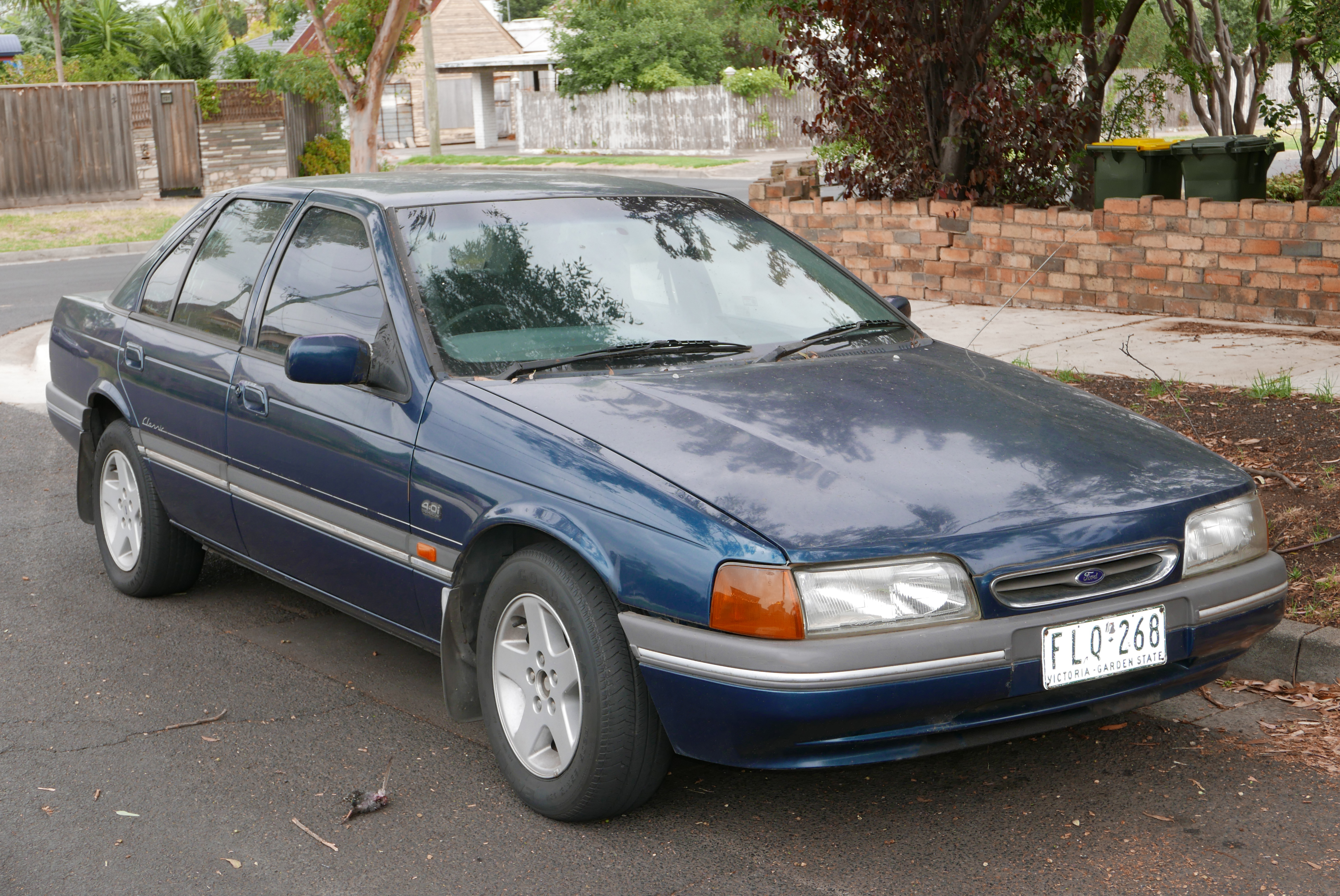
Falcon Futura Classic sedan

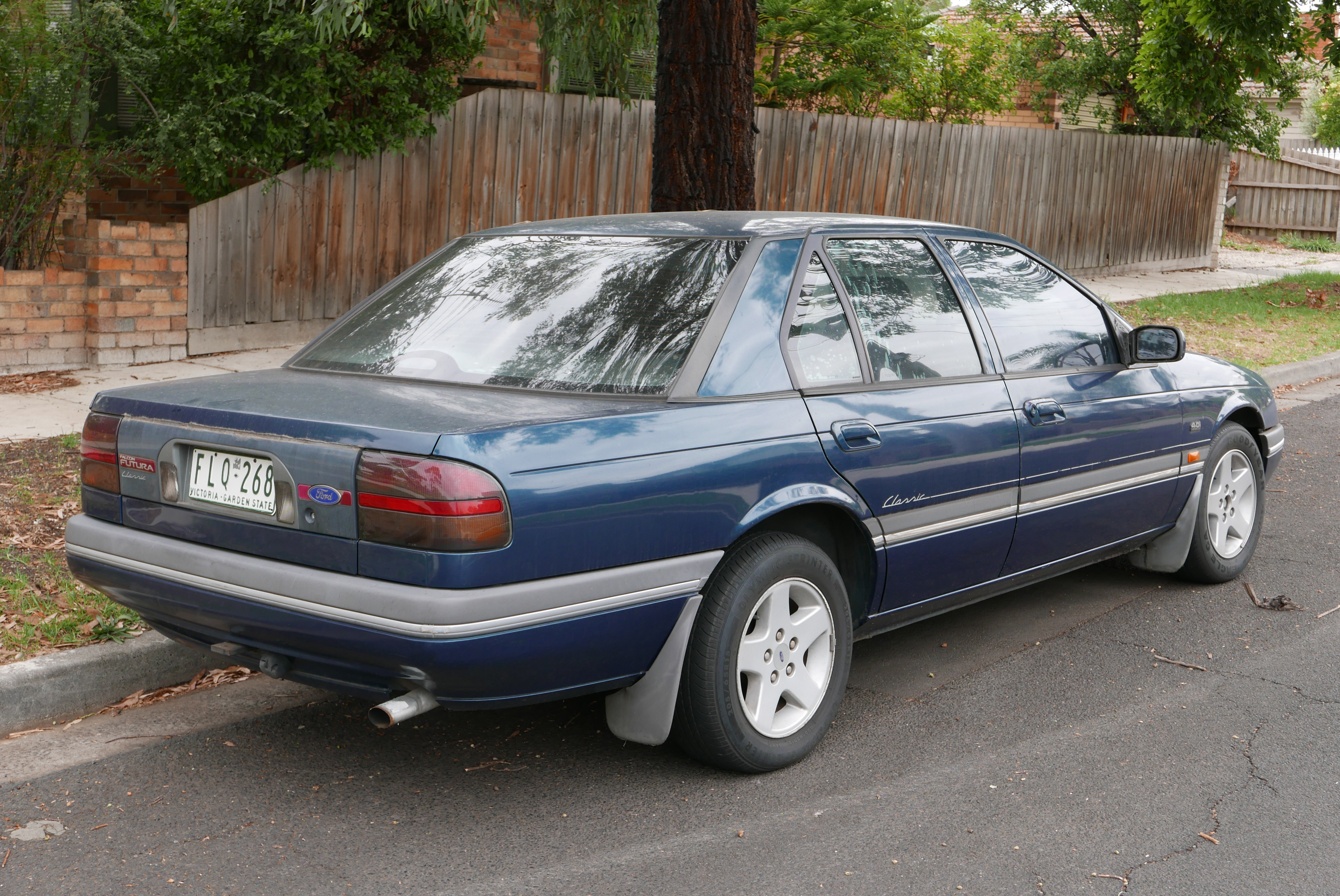
Falcon Futura Classic sedan

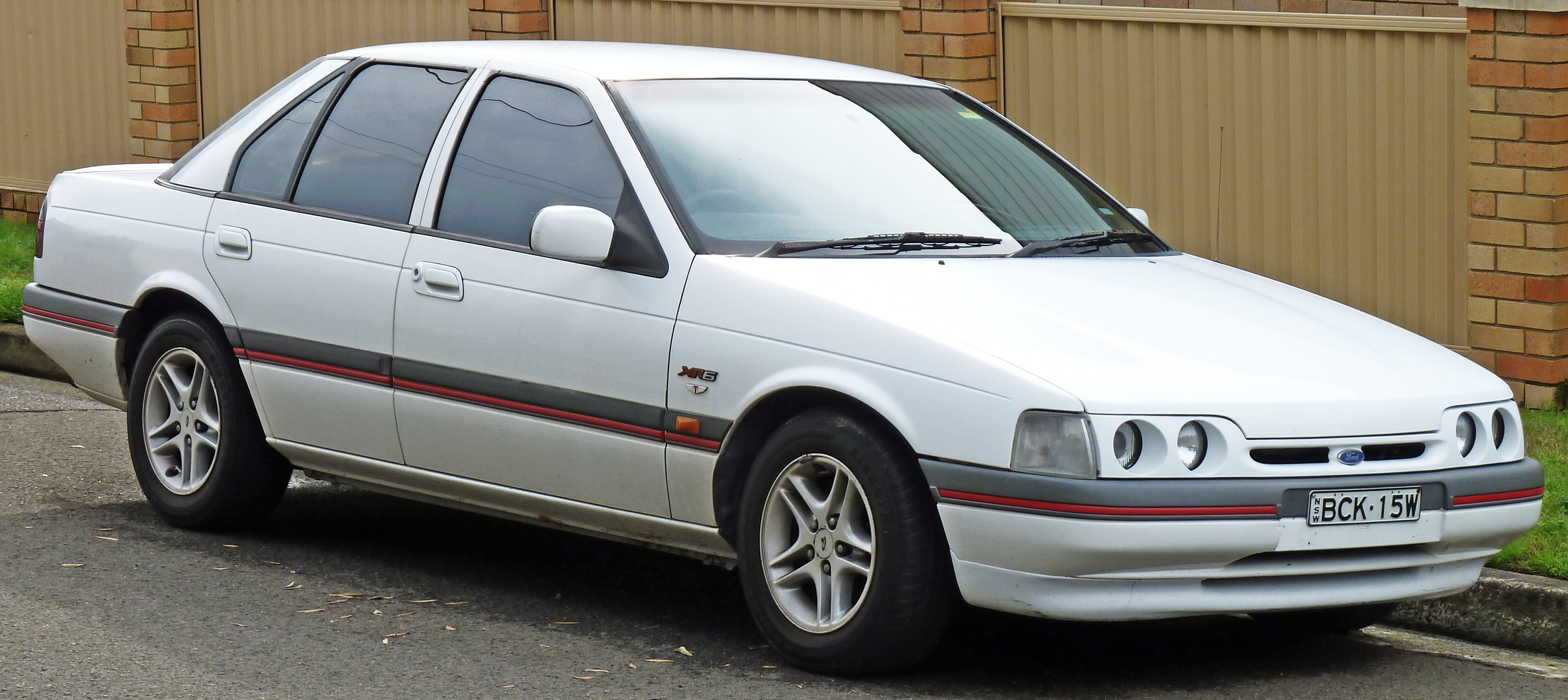
Falcon XR6 sedan

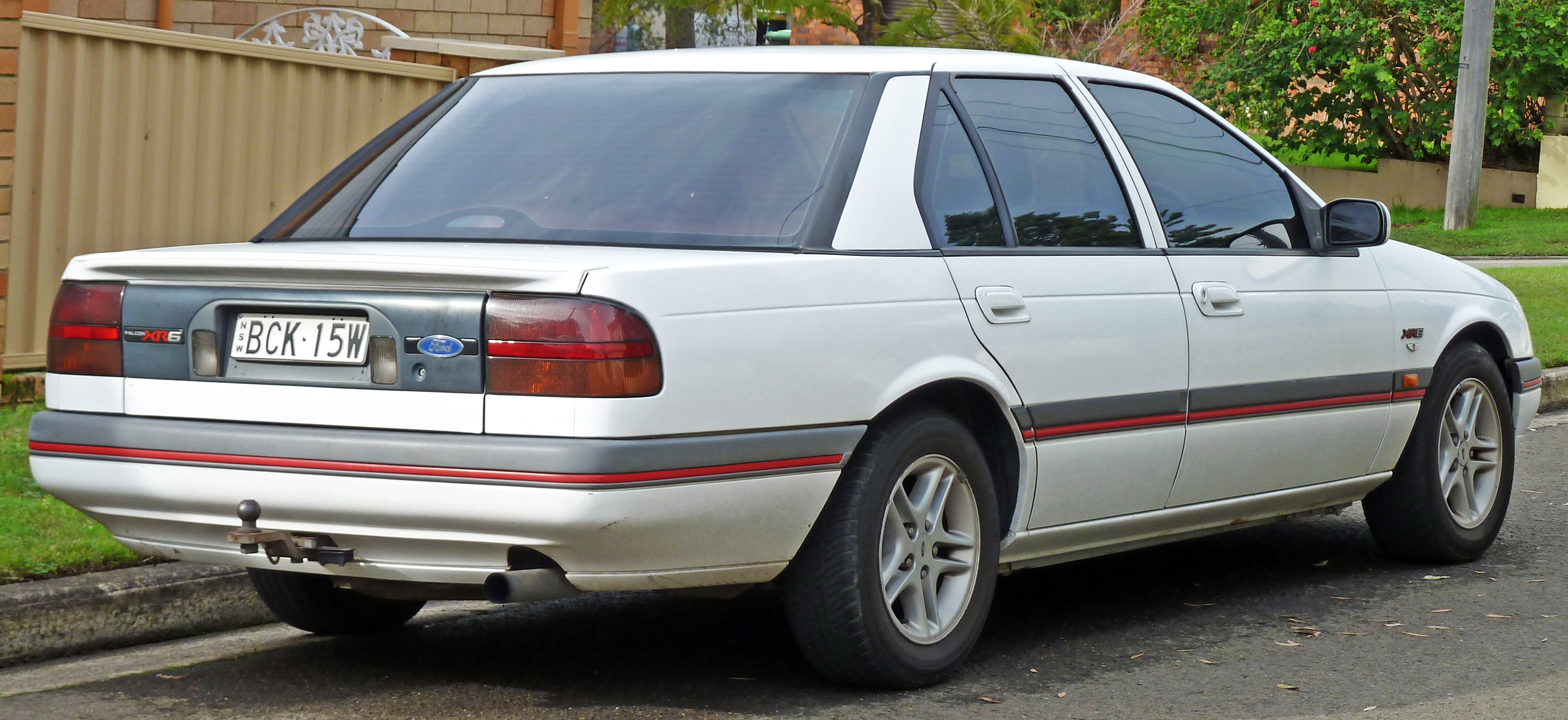
Falcon XR6 sedan

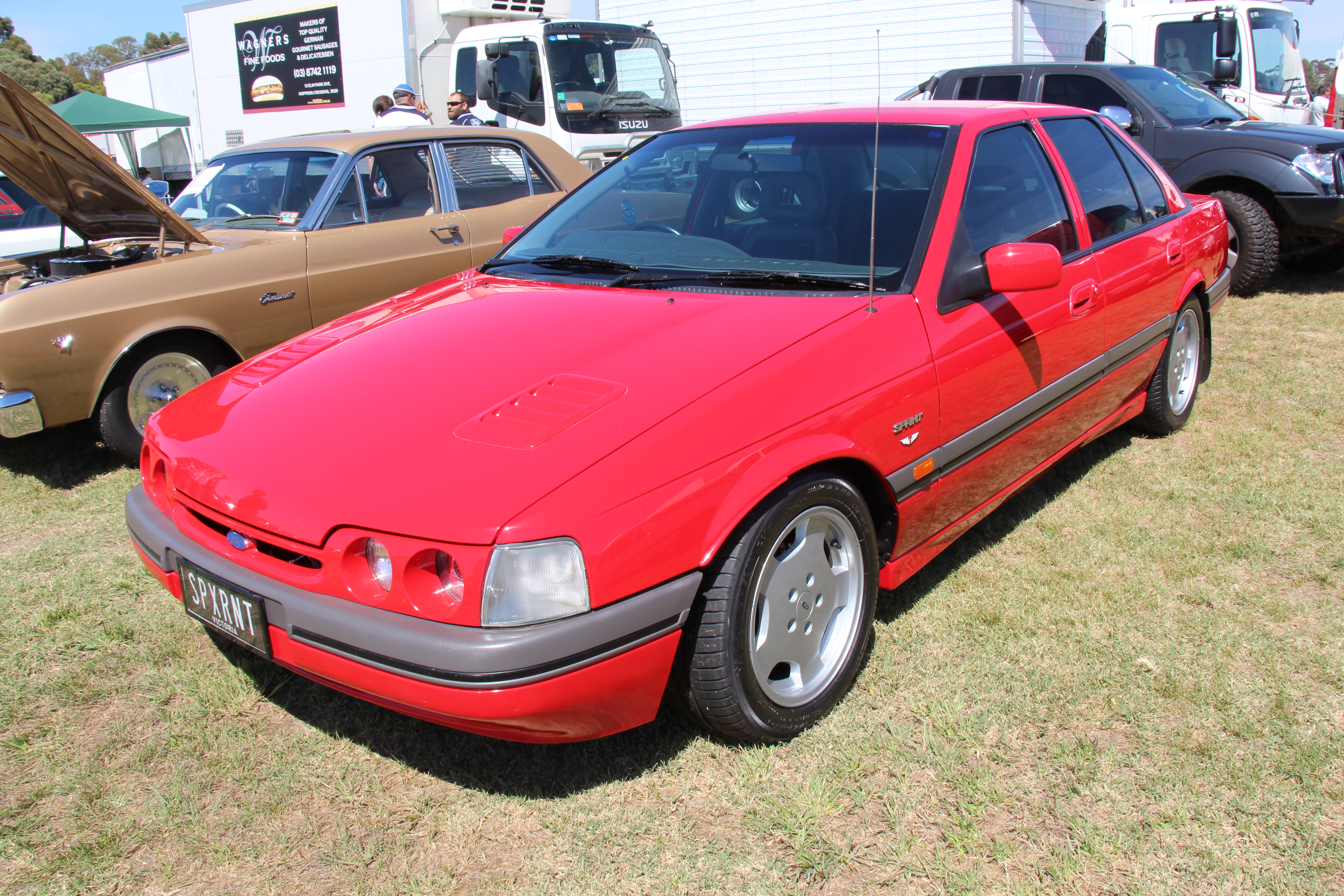
Falcon XR8 Sprint sedan

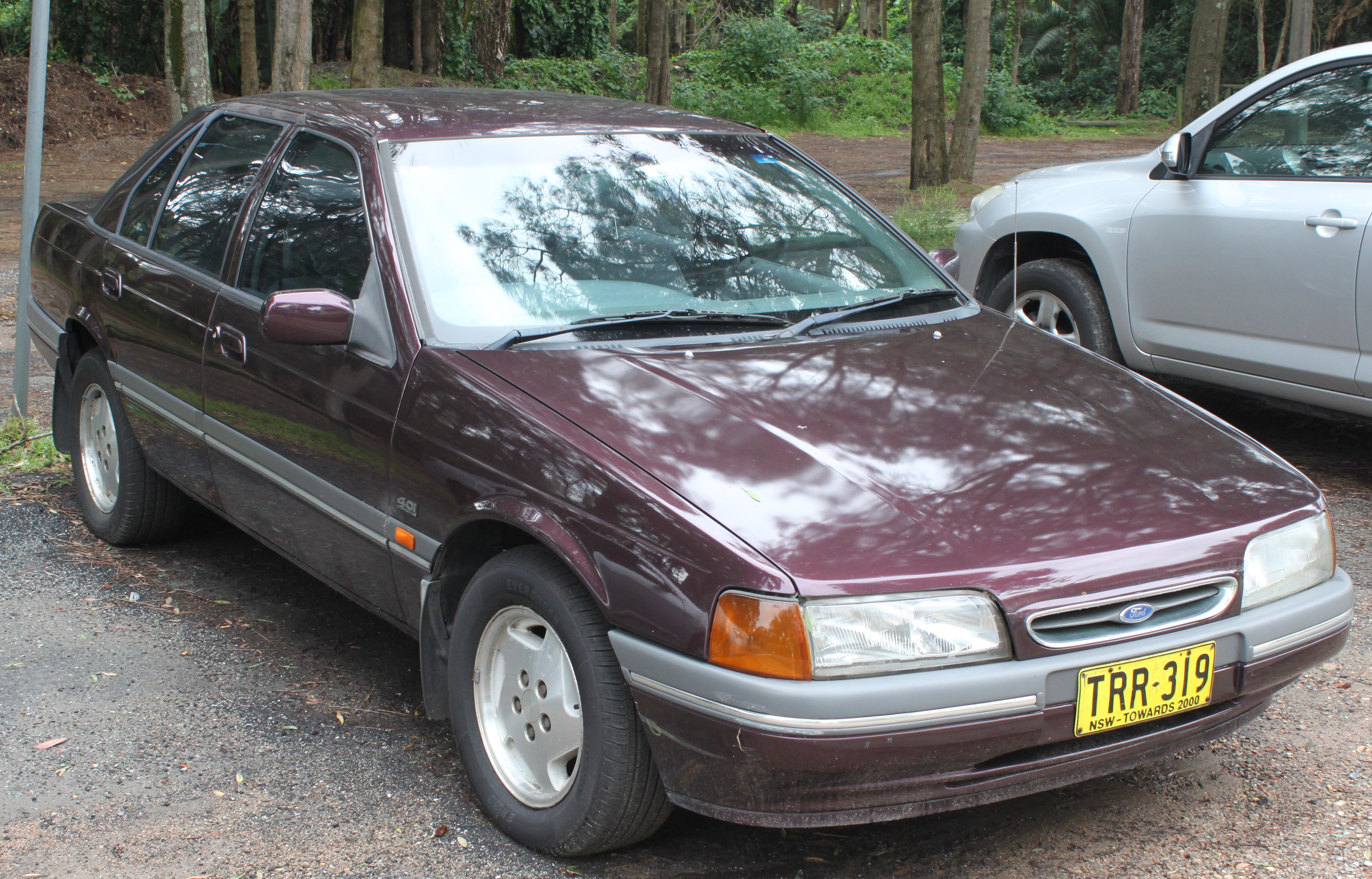
Fairmont sedan

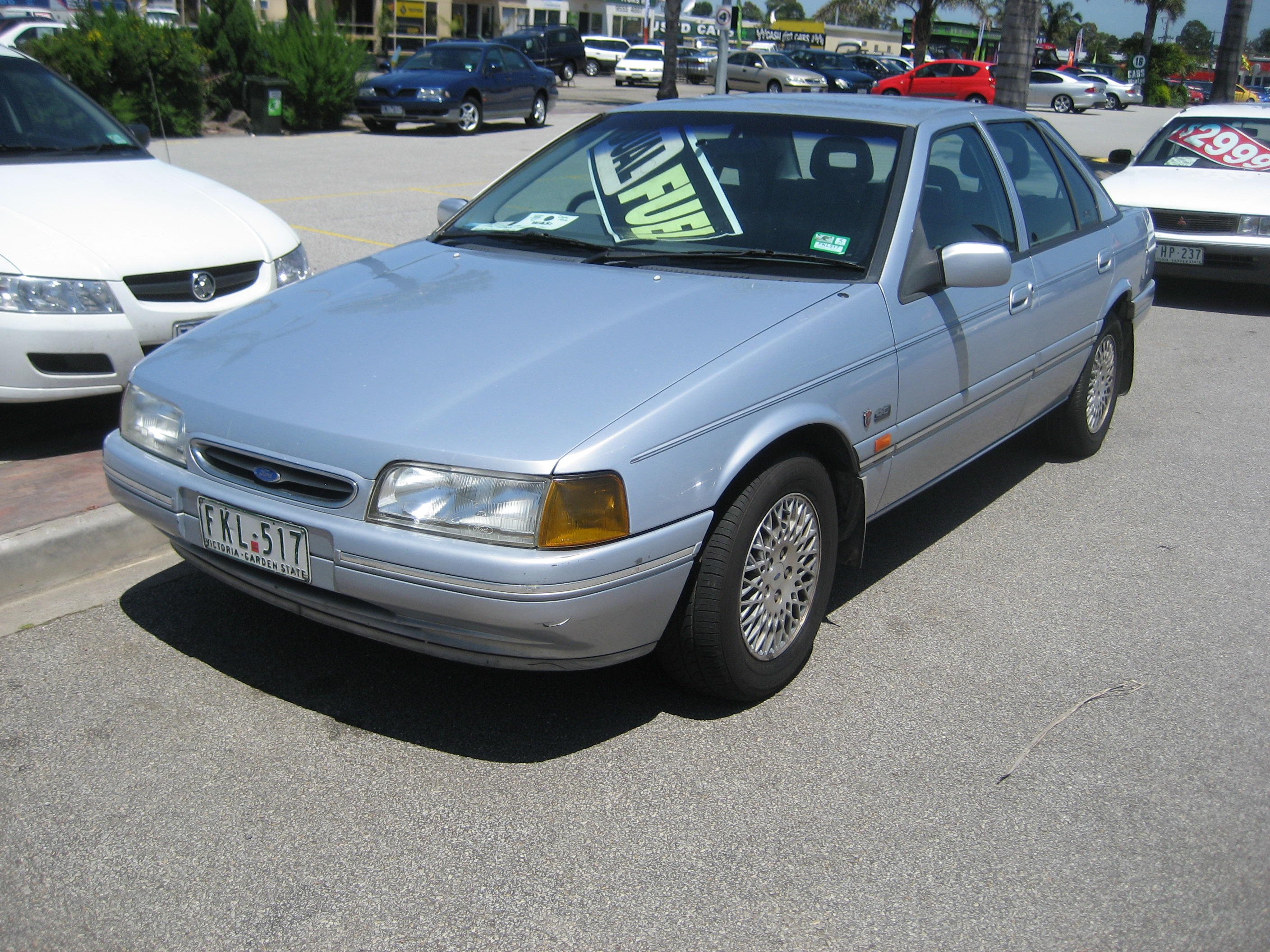
Fairmont Ghia sedan

== Production and replacement ==
Ford Australia replaced the ED Falcon with the heavily updated Ford Falcon (EF) in August 1994, with ED production having totaled 72,571 units.

== See also ==
- Ford Falcon (XG) – utility and panel van of the Falcon line running concurrently with the ED series of cars and wagons.
