= 1953 Round Australia Trial =

1953 Round Australia Trial Redex Trial
Next event →
- Host country: Australia
- Rally base: Sydney
- Dates run: 30 August – 13 September 1953
- Stages: 15
- Stage surface: Tarmac and Gravel
- Overall distance: 10,460 km (6,500 miles)

Statistics
- Crews: 186 at start, 142 at finish

Overall results
- Overall winner: (Australia) Ken Tubman (Australia) John Marshall

The 1953 Round Australia Trial, officially the Redex Trial was the inaugural running of the Round Australia Trial. The rally took place between 30 August and 13 September 1953. The event covered 10,460 kilometres around Australia. It was won by Ken Tubman and John Marshall, driving a Peugeot 203.

== Results ==
Pos	No	Entrant	Drivers	Car	Penalties (Points)
1	48	(Australia) Team Tubman and Marshall	(Australia) Ken Tubman (Australia) John Marshall	Peugeot 203	19
2	191	(Australia) John McGrath Motors	(Australia) Ken Robinson (Australia) Russell Lane (Australia) Anthony Peck	Humber Super Snipe Mark IV	20
3	160	(Australia) D.H. Antill	(Australia) Peter Antill (Australia) George Reed (Australia) Max Winkless	Plymouth 1952 Concord	21
4	41	(Australia) Preston Motors Pty Ltd	(Australia) Lex Davison (Australia) Peter Ward (Australia) Otto Stone	Holden 48-215	22
5	64	(Australia) Lloyd Davies	(Australia) Lloyd Davies (Australia) Lisle Dunmore (Australia) Jack Cherry	Holden 48-215	23
6	91	(Australia) E.A. Nelson	(Australia) Eric Nelson (Australia) Bill Burrows (Australia) S. Baker	Standard Vanguard Phase II	23
7	51	(Australia) J.A. Masling	(Australia) Jack Masling (Australia) Leo Hennessy (Australia) Don Baldry	Humber Super Snipe Mark II	25
8	115	(Australia) David McKay	(Australia) David McKay (Australia) Rex Marshall	Austin A40 Somerset	28
9	46	(Australia) John McGrath Motors	(Australia) Tom Sulman (Australia) John Hall (Australia) Jock Morgan	Humber Super Snipe Mark IV	30
10	57	(Australia) W.T. Nunn	(Australia) Bill Nunn (Australia) Leonard Voss (Australia) Ron Smyth	Mercury 1939 Eight	30
11	145	(Australia) Footscray Motors	(Australia) M. Gilbert (Australia) Laurie Oxenford	Standard Vanguard Phase II	30
12	117	(Australia) Jack Jeffrey	(Australia) Jack Jeffrey (Australia) Neil Smyth	Peugeot 203	33
13	5	(Australia) A.L. Kipling	(Australia) 'Possum' Kipling (Australia) John Hughes	Holden 48-215	36
14	53	(Australia) J.P. Crouch	(Australia) John Crouch (Australia) John Dowling (Australia) Jack Walker	Peugeot 203	37
15	28	(Australia) Neville Vale	(Australia) Neville Vale (Australia) Spencer Vale	Mercedes-Benz 170 D	42
16	13	(Australia) E.B. Perkins	(Australia) Eddie Perkins (Australia) Lance Perkins	Rover 75	46
17	52	(Australia) T.H. Farrell	(Australia) Tom Farrell (Australia) Frank Denlay (Australia) John Jones	Ford 1952 Customline	50
18	122	(Australia) T.L. Quill	(Australia) Tom Quill (Australia) Frank Campbell	Ford Consul	61
19	85	(Australia) M.L. Arentz	(Australia) Martin Arentz (Australia) Norman Bond (Australia) Ricky Smidt	Ford 1953 Customline	86
20	114	(Australia) Preston Motors Pty Ltd	(Australia) Charlie Dean (Australia) John Joyce (Australia) Lou Molina	Holden 48-215	88
21	93	(Australia) D.L. West	(Australia) Des West (Australia) Lindsay West	Holden 48-215	91
22	150	(Australia) D.B. Williams	(Australia) Doug Williams (Australia) Donald Bain	MG TD Midget	96
23	175	(Australia) Team Brenchley and Brown	(Australia) Colin Brenchley (Australia) Cliff Brown	Plymouth 1948 De Luxe	108
24	113	(Australia) F.W. Hecker	(Australia) Sam Hecker (Australia) Norm Hutchison (Australia) Norwood Warry	Holden 48-215	121
25	158	(Australia) A.F. Johnson	(Australia) Fred Johnson (Australia) Ray Johnson	Chevrolet 1950 Deluxe	125
26	167	(Australia) Preston Motors Pty Ltd	(Australia) Stan Jones (Australia) Bill Patterson (Australia) Ern Seeliger	Holden 48-215	126
27	143	(Australia) Orrmans Service Station	(Australia) Kenneth Orrman (Australia) Ian Mountain (Australia) Robert Orrman	Peugeot 203	127
28	129	(Australia) E.J. Lefoe	(Australia) John Lefoe (Australia) Ellis Glover (Australia) Haugh Featherston	Standard Vanguard Phase II	143
29	66	(Australia) M. & B. Distributors	(Australia) Walter Luxton (Australia) Frank Lobb	Mercedes-Benz 170S	146
30	21	(Australia) W.J. Locke	(Australia) Jim Locke (Australia) Laurie Haysom (Australia) David Maclure	Holden 48-215	160
31	135	(Australia) Jack Saywell	(Australia) Jack Saywell (Australia) Dave Sullivan (Australia) S. Fellows	Mercedes-Benz 170 D	163
32	184	(Australia) R.R. Noble	(Australia) Ron Noble (Australia) Unknown	Chevrolet 1937 Master	167
33	75	(Australia) M.S. Law	(Australia) Martin Law (Australia) Malcolm Robinson (Australia) Pauline Barnes	Humber Super Snipe Mark III	170
34	9	(Australia) Larke Hoskins	(Australia) Barry Gurdon (Australia) Unknown	Austin A40 Devon	174
35	25	(Australia) W.A. Burns	(Australia) William Burns (Australia) Leonard Hubball (Australia) Clive Odgers (Australia) Norm Hord	Holden 48-215	188
36	121	(Australia) William Hayes	(Australia) William Hayes (Australia) Len Slade (Australia) Ken Walker	Standard Vanguard Phase II	193
37	179	(Australia) Bill English	(Australia) Bill English (Australia) Ralph Newton	Austin A40 Devon	208
38	156	(Australia) Keith Jones	(Australia) Keith Jones (Australia) William Shipway	Riley 2.5 Litre	214
39	97	(Australia) J.E. Roberts	(Australia) Don Roberts (Australia) George Roberts	Standard Vanguard Phase II	217
40	112	(Australia) David Bowman	(Australia) David Bowman (Australia) C. Bowman (Australia) Paddy Fergusson	Holden 48-215	226
41	82	(Australia) R.A. Gardiner	(Australia) Rueb Gardiner (Australia) Les Faulkner	Ford 1947 V8	233
42	63	(Australia) J.R. Seymour	(Australia) Ron Seymour (Australia) Norm Foley	Ford Consul	234
43	24	(Australia) W. Allen	(Australia) W. Allen (Australia) Clive Adams	Holden 48-215	236
44	116	(Australia) Reno Auto Sales	(Australia) Reg Smith (Australia) Fred Allen (Australia) Harley Mehegan	Ford 1952 Customline	254
45	99	(Australia) H.R. Smith	(Australia) Harry Smith (Australia) Jim Clay	Peugeot 203	255
46	92	(Australia) A.E. Fraser	(Australia) A. Fraser (Australia) C. White (Australia) L. Arden	Jaguar Mark VII	266
47	43	(Australia) Don Gorringe	(Australia) Don Gorringe (Australia) William Caldwell (Australia) Trevor Gorringe	Jowett Javelin	289
48	165	(Australia) J.A. Bickett	(Australia) John Bickett (Australia) Sam Miller	Ford 1952 Customline	294
49	140	(Australia) Gibson Industries	(Australia) 'Hoot' Gibson (Australia) Les Ramsay (Australia) Sid Gibson	Standard Vanguard Phase II	305
50	108	(Australia) C.W. Graham	(Australia) Colin Graham (Australia) MacGregor Graham (Australia) Terry Gilbert	Peugeot 203	306
51	6	(Australia) D.A. McLachlan	(Australia) Bill McLachlan (Australia) Marie Higgs (Australia) Malcolm McKay	Ford 1952 Customline	308
52	133	(Australia) W.K. Meier	(Australia) William Meier (Australia) Stan Jones	Austin A40 Devon	310
53	84	(Australia) A.G. Melrose	(Australia) Aubrey Melrose (Australia) Harry Murray (Australia) John Van Lieven	Austin A40 Devon	311
54	80	(Australia) A.H. Gibson	(Australia) Alex Gibson (Australia) H. Howell	Mercedes-Benz 170 D	320
55	96	(Australia) C.A. Roberts	(Australia) Chris Roberts (Australia) Wallace Hair (Australia) Guy Bristol	Ford Zephyr Six	322
56	7	(Australia) E.J. Brotherton	(Australia) Jeff Brotherton (Australia) Maurie Monk	Austin A30	331
57	181	(Australia) J.A. Brabham	(Australia) Jack Brabham (Australia) Bill Armstrong (Australia) Ron Tauranac	Holden 48-215	334
58	55	(Australia) C.J. Arthur	(Australia) Cliff Arthur (Australia) Edna Arthur (Australia) Ron Campbell	Peugeot 203	337
59	22	(Australia) C.E. Dix	(Australia) Cecil Dix (Australia) Ronald Dix (Australia) Alec Dealtry (Australia) Keith Pederson	DeSoto 1947 Deluxe	346
60	166	(Australia) Lionel Ryan	(Australia) Lionel Ryan (Australia) Tom Day (Australia) Edgar Ryan	Holden 48-215	357
61	44	(Australia) Team Tyas and Craigie	(Australia) Ken Tyas (Australia) J. Craigie	Ford Consul	372
62	87	(Australia) Team Buly and Williams	(Australia) Lloyd Buly (Australia) Stan Williams (Australia) Lyle Gray (Australia) Fred Haig	Ford 1953 Customline	372
63	138	(Australia) Jack Phillips	(Australia) Jack Phillips (Australia) Ron Phillips (Australia) Jack Cox	Ford 1953 Customline	373
64	58	(Australia) Harold Weal	(Australia) Harold Weal (Australia) Harold Weal, Jr.	Ford 1951 Custom	383
65	67	(Australia) Keith McCrohon	(Australia) Keith McCrohon (Australia) Raymond Fuller (Australia) Alex Nicol	Ford 1939 V8 Deluxe	398
68	132	(Australia) J.B. Carrington	(Australia) Banks Carrington (Australia) Neville Barnett (Australia) Ernest Smith	Morris Oxford Series MO	399
69	40	(Australia) Bill Messenger	(Australia) Bill Messenger (Australia) Unknown	Mercury 1946 Eight	428
70	30	(Australia) J.F. McCafferty	(Australia) John McCafferty (Australia) Ray George	Chevrolet 1951 Deluxe	453
71	88	(Australia) Ron Muir and Sons	(Australia) Ron Muir (Australia) Bill Dresser (Australia) Ron Speet	Ford Consul	456
72	73	(Australia) Advanx (Gosford) Motor Service	(Australia) Robert Boddenberg (Australia) A. Ghersi (Australia) E.Pinkerton	Peugeot 203	458
73	69	(Australia) W.C. Zeh	(Australia) Willy Zeh (Australia) Tom Buddle	Mercedes-Benz 170 D	465
74	86	(Australia) Titanic Steel Fab	(Australia) Dan Mott (Australia) Eric Staples	Jaguar Mark VII	478
75	176	(Australia) Courtney and Patterson	(Australia) A. Patterson (Australia) Lloyd Edwards	Ford Prefect	486
76	168	(Australia) Roy Rothwell	(Australia) Roy Rothwell (Australia) Hugh Rothwell (Australia) Clive Mitchell	Holden 48-215	489
77	106	(Australia) John McGrath Motors	(Australia) Nat Buchanan (Australia) Len Weston (Australia) Cedric James	Humber Super Snipe Mark IV	490
78	146	(Australia) J.E. O'Connell	(Australia) J. O'Connell (Australia) Lou Hall (Australia) Jack Kemp	Chevrolet 1952 Deluxe	496
79	4	(Australia) L.F. Bailey	(Australia) Lyle Bailey (Australia) L. Black (Australia) N. Bailey	Mercedes-Benz 170S	500
80	38	(Australia) D.R. McPherson	(Australia) Don McPherson (Australia) Ossie Steer (Australia) Ted Tallis (Australia) Bill Wagner	Ford 1953 Customline	547
81	149	(Australia) D & K Taxis Limited	(Australia) Arthur Garner (Australia) Jack Wade (Australia) Mort Harvie	Holden 48-215	550
82	33	(Australia) Austin Distributors Pty Ltd	(Australia) Ken Smyth (Australia) Geoff Smith	Austin A30	560
83	90	(Australia) Larke Hoskins	(Australia) Curly Brydon (Australia) Tom Jemison	Austin A40 Somerset	575
84	83	(Australia) Frank Kleinig	(Australia) Frank Kleinig (Australia) Clive Gibson	Morris Minor Series II	622
85	45	(Australia) Syd O'Halloran	(Australia) Syd O'Halloran (Australia) Jim Savage	Plymouth 1938	640
86	101	(Australia) N.L. Olivier	(Australia) N. Olivier (Australia) Geoff Kittle	MG TD Midget	656
87	125	(Australia) V.R. Burton	(Australia) Viv Burton (Australia) Sam Craig	Morris Minor MM	657
88	56	(Australia) S.J. Carpenter	(Australia) Stanley Carpenter (Australia) Richard Carpenter	Terraplane 1937	660
89	185	(Australia) Glandore Motors	(Australia) Charles Tabberer (Australia) Bob Burnett-Reid	Chevrolet 1937 Master Coupe	666
90	126	(Australia) L.V. March	(Australia) Les March (Australia) John Brooker	MG TD Midget	677
91	107	(Australia) Jack Davey	(Australia) Jack Davey (Australia) Lou Moss (Australia) Alan Taylor (Australia) Arthur Cushing	Ford 1952 Customline	681
92	137	(Australia) Noel Sweeney	(Australia) Noel Sweeney (Australia) B. Hutchison	Jaguar Mark VII	707
93	136	(Australia) Paramount Service Station	(Australia) Rex Sendy (Australia) Murray Chesser	Ford Consul	729
94	151	(Australia) J.E. Pedley	(Australia) Joe Pedley (Australia) Fred Hargrave	Austin A70 Hereford	729
95	105	(Australia) Harry Thompson	(Australia) Harry Thompson (Australia) Wal Gillespie	Singer Nine	783
96	152	(Australia) S.C. Johnson	(Australia) Stan Johnson (Australia) Len Reeves (Australia) Eric Daley	Studebaker 1947 Champion	788
97	189	(Australia) J.A. Witter	(Australia) Jack Witter (Australia) Raymond Pantlin	Hudson Pacemaker	792
98	23	(Australia) Team Milne and Conrad	(Australia) G. Milne (Australia) Bill Conrad	Vauxhall Velox	795
99	89	(Australia) N.M. Hamilton	(Australia) Norm Hamilton (Australia) Ken Harper	Porsche 356	808
100	98	(Australia) Miss Lois Rowe	(Australia) Lois Rowe (Australia) Nola Rowe (Australia) Diana Brunton	Sunbeam-Talbot 90	854
101	187	(Australia) F.A. Price	(Australia) Frank Price (Australia) Dick Cobden (Australia) Kethel Rooke	Singer SM1500	868
102	170	(Australia) W.J. Hamilton	(Australia) W. Hamilton (Australia) Unknown	Citroën Light 15	877
103	14	(Australia) Team Drew and Cousins	(Australia) Harvey Drew (Australia) Bill Cousins	Studebaker 1938 Commander	900
104	103	(Australia) Keith Napier	(Australia) Keith Napier (Australia) Alan Dickson (Australia) Allan Irish	Plymouth 1934	927
105	29	(Australia) Škoda Distributors	(Australia) Harry Atkinson (Australia) Ronald Wiseman (Australia) Kevin Murphy	Škoda 1101	945
106	142	(Australia) O.E. Yates	(Australia) Owen Yates (Australia) Bob Collett (Australia) Lou Edwards	Austin A90 Atlantic	946
107	127	(Australia) A.A. Anderson	(Australia) 'Duck' Anderson (Australia) Tony Anthony (Australia) Arthur Higgins	Holden 48-215	951
108	59	(Australia) Don Hassett	(Australia) Don Hassett (Australia) Hank Edgar (Australia) Geoff Walker	Austin A40 Devon	960
109	17	(Australia) R.C. Neeley	(Australia) Ray Neeley (Australia) Allan Ashcroft	Allard M2X	961
110	42	(Australia) Woollahra Driving School	(Australia) Frank Eastlake (Australia) Jack Fletcher (Australia) John Webb	Holden 48-215	977
111	130	(Australia) D. and R. Charlesworth	(Australia) D. Charlesworth (Australia) R. Charlesworth (Australia) John Drew	Humber Hawk Mark V	1,033
112	144	(Australia) D.H. Heggie	(Australia) Don Heggie (Australia) C. Heggie	Ford Zephyr Six	1,125
113	148	(Australia) C.R. Turner	(Australia) Claude Turner (Australia) A. Burriss (Australia) S. Waiber	Humber Hawk Mark V	1,135
114	172	(Australia) L.P. Dorgan	(Australia) Leo Dorgan (Australia) Pat Riley (Australia) Les Makin	Buick 1939 Special	1,209
115	39	(Australia) J.P. Nind	(Australia) John Nind (Australia) Claude Jewson	MG TD Midget	1,316
116	109	(Australia) Stan Levy	(Australia) Stan Levy (Australia) Unknown	Ford 1953 Customline	1,321
117	77	(Australia) R.J. Mulcahy	(Australia) R. Mulcahy (Australia) N. Farmer (Australia) Guy Cuthertson	Austin A70 Hereford	1,348
118	36	(Australia) D. Stanborough	(Australia) D. Stanborough (Australia) Unknown	MG TD Midget	1,419
119	74	(Australia) Les Burrows	(Australia) Les Burrows (Australia) Stan Shepheard (Australia) Alf Barrett	Standard Vanguard Phase II	1,447
120	155	(Australia) Q.C. Smith	(Australia) Clem Smith (Australia) Reg Sparks	Terraplane 1935	1,472
121	162	(Australia) St James Driving School	(Australia) John Moore (Australia) Eric Pywell (Australia) Barry Taylor	Austin A40 Devon	1,483
122	159	(Australia) B.D. Kingston	(Australia) Ben Kingston (Australia) John Roe (Australia) M. Kingston	Jaguar Mark VII	1,500
123	2	(Australia) K.F. Thallon	(Australia) Keith Thallon (Australia) Harold Dowling	Morris Minor Series II	1,617
124	169	(Australia) C.V. Cresswell	(Australia) Charles Cresswell (Australia) Sid Cresswell (Australia) Arthur Lynn	Plymouth 1947 De Luxe	1,629
125	177	(Australia) Alan Carter	(Australia) Alan Carter (Australia) Ann Carter	Riley 2.5 Litre	1,659
126	31	(Australia) Eric Roberts	(Australia) Eric Roberts (Australia) Bert Endersby	Morris Minor Series II	1,661
127	124	(Australia) R.F. Templar	(Australia) Ray Templar (Australia) 'Blue' Ryan (Australia) Bill Williamson	Rover 75	1,703
128	79	(Australia) F.M. Higgins	(Australia) F. Higgins (Australia) D. Cameron (Australia) F. Gill	Peugeot 203	1,726
129	164	(Australia) Advanx (Gosford) Motor Service	(Australia) Robert Burgin (Australia) M. Griffiths (Australia) Roy Francis	Peugeot 203	1,829
130	81	(Australia) Fred Maguire	(Australia) Fred Maguire (Australia) John Larkin (Australia) John Wawn	Nash 1946 600	1,899
131	163	(Australia) C.F. Herbert	(Australia) Cyril Herbert (Australia) Allen Hallett	Standard Fourteen	1,935
132	34	(Australia) Team Graham and Goldhurst	(Australia) Frank Graham (Australia) Peter Hamilton	Ford 1932 V8 Roadster	1,940
133	19	(Australia) Mrs Winifred Conway	(Australia) Winifred Conway (Australia) Denys Tanner (Australia) Margaret Bruce	Austin A40 Devon	1,979
134	192	(Australia) Miss J. Hill	(Australia) Bill Mair (Australia) Reg Lusby	Renault 750	1,979
135	60	(Australia) Commonwealth Motors	(Australia) Laurie Whitehead (Australia) Ian Barns (Australia) Bill Buckle	Citroën Big Six	2,024
136	154	(Australia) David Rance	(Australia) David Rance (Australia) Len Taylor	MG TD Midget	2,158
137	171	(Australia) D.K. Carmody	(Australia) Keith Carmody (Australia) Ray Melville	Fiat 1400	2,383
138	173	(Australia) Tom Mills	(Australia) Tom Mills (Australia) Jack O'Hara (Australia) Bert Easterbrook	Hudson 1937	2,408
139	147	(Australia) O.M. Joseph	(Australia) Oscar Joseph (Australia) Jack Joseph (Australia) Harry Tartlin (Australia) Neville Branson	Chrysler 77	2,409
140	95	(Australia) M.D. von Sanden	(Australia) Max von Sanden (Australia) Valda Marshall (Australia) Lin Paltridge	Nash 1928 Light Six	2,414
141	68	(Australia) Interstate Car Rentals	(Australia) Donald Tottey (Australia) Archie Barnett	Ford Anglia Tourer	2,702
142	180	(Australia) V.C. Hannaford	(Australia) Vic Hannaford (Australia) Merv Barrie (Australia) Rex Ellis	Holden 48-215	3,169
