= 1954 Round Australia Trial =

1954 Round Australia Trial Redex Trial
← Previous event	Next event →
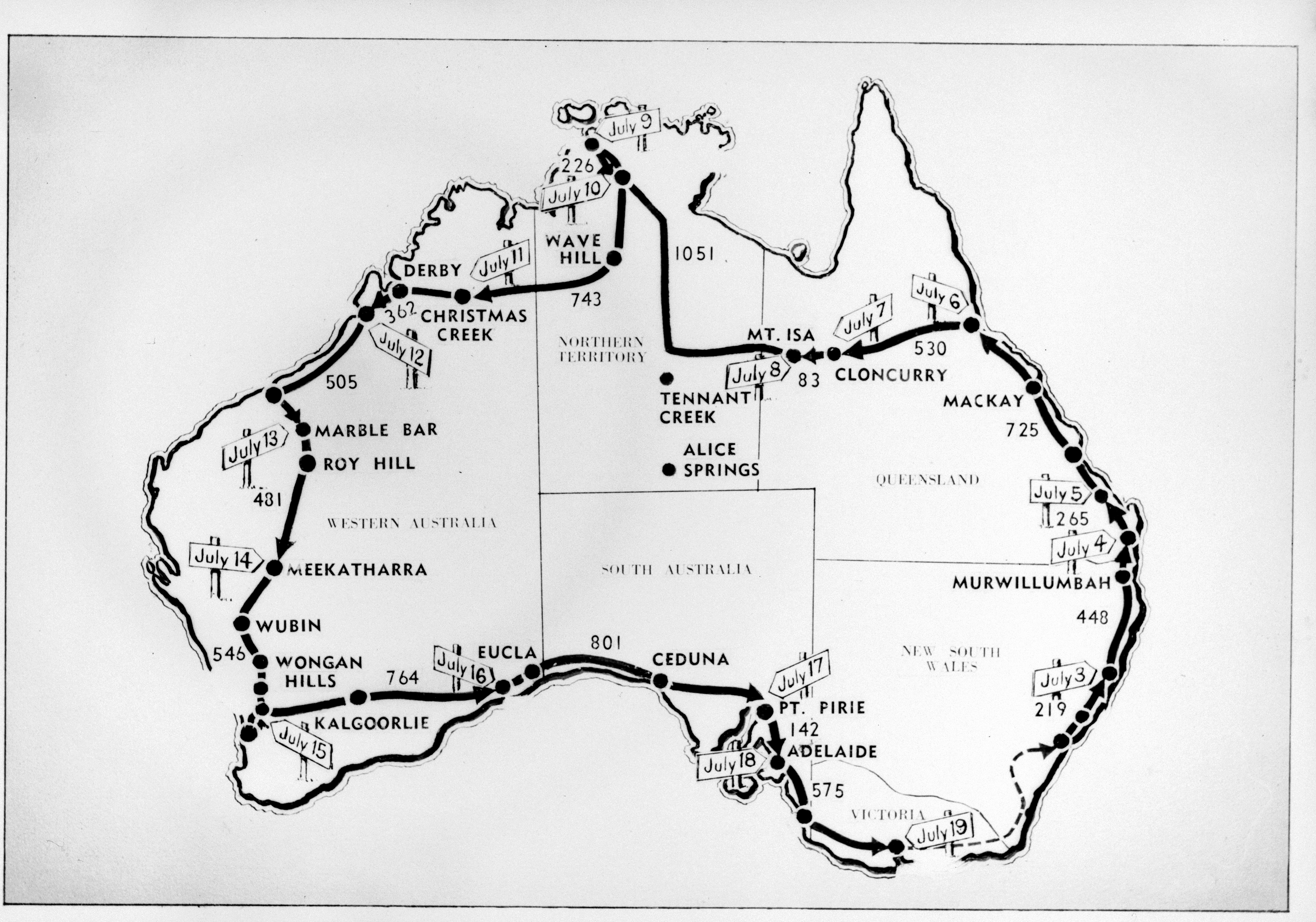
- Redex Trial map, Australia, July 1954
- Host country: Australia
- Rally base: Sydney
- Dates run: 3 – 20 July 1954
- Stages: 16
- Stage surface: Tarmac and Gravel
- Overall distance: 15,450 km (9,600 miles)

Statistics
- Crews: 246 at start, 120 at finish

Overall results
- Overall winner: (Australia) Jack 'Gelignite' Murray (Australia) Bill Murray

The 1954 Round Australia Trial, officially the Redex Trial was the second running of the Round Australia Trial. The rally took place between 3 and 20 July 1954 over 9,600 miles (15,400 km), and had a first prize of £2,000. The route was truly "round (mainland) Australia", beginning in Sydney on 3 July 1954, passing through Brisbane, Rockhampton, Mackay, Townsville, Mount Isa, Darwin, Broome, Meekatharra, Madura, Adelaide and Melbourne, finishing at Moore Park on 20 July.

246 cars took part and 127 finished within the times allowed, though many doggedly completed the course in the following week. One forced to drop out was the celebrated radio personality Jack Davey. The winner was a Ford 1948 V8, an ex-taxi dubbed the "Grey Ghost", driven by John Eric "Gelignite Jack" Murray (1907–1983) and navigated by the unrelated Bill Murray, losing no points on the trip. It was on this trial that Murray gained his nickname, from his occasional celebratory detonation of sticks of explosive, a custom that delighted some and infuriated others. "Secret" intermediate checkpoints were an innovation this year in an attempt to curb speeding.

1954 Redex Trial newsreel

== Results ==
Pos	No	Entrant	Drivers	Car	Penalties (Points)
1	256	(Australia) J.E. Murray	(Australia) Jack 'Gelignite' Murray (Australia) Bill Murray	1948 Ford V8	0
2	29	(Australia) G.W. Patterson	(Australia) Bill Patterson (Australia) Harry Russell	Peugeot 203	8
3	176	(Australia) A.A.C. Anderson	(Australia) 'Duck' Anderson (Australia) Tony Anthony (Australia) Vergel Zaccour	Holden FJ	14
4	30	(Australia) E.A. Nelson	(Australia) Eric Nelson (Australia) Brian Simpson	Standard Vanguard Phase II	19
5	31	Rootes (Australia) Limited	(Australia) Tom Sulman (Australia) T. Dowse (Australia) Norman Hutchison	Humber Super Snipe Mark IV	22
6	260	(Australia) Preston Motors Pty Ltd	(Australia) Stan Jones (Australia) Don Thomson (Australia) Ern Seeliger	Holden FJ	22
7	22	(Australia) J.E. Roberts	(Australia) Don Roberts (Australia) Bill Edmonds	Standard Vanguard Phase II	25
8	33	(Australia) T.H. Farrell	(Australia) Tom Farrell (Australia) Frank Denlay (Australia) John Jones	1954 Ford Customline	25
9	96	(Australia) Team Gibson and Vale	(Australia) Alex Gibson (Australia) Neville Vale	Mercedes-Benz 170 D	25
10	52	(Australia) R.B. Walker	(Australia) Bruce Walker (Australia) Reginald Hall	Standard Vanguard Phase II	26
11	262	(Australia) F.A. Johnson	(Australia) Fred Johnson (Australia) Ray Johnson	Holden 48-215	27
12	20	(Australia) H.C. Cape	(Australia) Harry Cape (Australia) George Scales	Holden FJ	28
13	27	(Australia) Sandy Rayward	(Australia) Sandy Rayward (Australia) Harvey Roy	Peugeot 203	29
14	54	(Australia) Regent Motors Pty Ltd	(Australia) Laurie Whitehead (Australia) Ian Barns	Volkswagen 1100	29
15	136	(Australia) Team Westren and Kennedy	(Australia) Les Westren (Australia) Carl Kennedy	Peugeot 203	30
16	126	(Australia) NSW Country Holden Dealers	(Australia) Ken Miller (Australia) Alan Miller (Australia) Norman Colless	Holden FJ	31
17	213	Rootes (Australia) Limited	(Australia) Russell Lane (Australia) Claude Turner (Australia) Donald Boynton	Humber Super Snipe Mark IV	32
18	53	(Australia) S.W. Hecker	(Australia) Sam Hecker (Australia) Jack Oliver (Australia) Norwood Warry	Holden FJ	32
19	199	(Australia) J.F. Crouch	(Australia) John Crouch (Australia) Keith Jones (Australia) Gordon Stewart	Morris Oxford Series II	33
20	253	(Australia) Standard Motor Company	(Australia) Harry Firth (Australia) Max Newbold (Australia) Reg Sparks	Standard Vanguard Phase II	33
21	46	(Australia) D.H. Antill	(Australia) Peter Antill (Australia) George Reed (Australia) Max Winkless	Mercedes-Benz 220	34
22	135	(Australia) Claridge Motors	(Australia) Fred Claridge (Australia) Jim Claridge	Holden FJ	34
23	19	(Australia) Reno Auto Sales	(Australia) Reg Smith (Australia) Robert Whyte (Australia) Harley Mehegan	Austin A70 Hereford	35
24	127	(Australia) A.L. Kipling	(Australia) 'Possum' Kipling (Australia) Ken Walker	Holden FJ	35
25	47	(Australia) J.F. McCaffery	(Australia) John McCaffery (Australia) Thomas Leonard	Holden FJ	37
26	156	(Australia) Walton and Gardner	(Australia) Ted Walton (Australia) Flo Gardner (Australia) John Gardner	Holden FJ	37
27	202	(Australia) Noel Worland	(Australia) Noel Worland (Australia) Michael Malouf (Australia) John Burton	Dodge 1954 Kingsway	38
28	78	(Australia) Frank Kleinig	(Australia) Frank Kleinig (Australia) Clive Gibson	Peugeot 203	38
29	10	(Australia) Marshalls Motors	(Australia) John Lefoe (Australia) Evan Green	Standard Vanguard Phase II	40
30	197	(Australia) Preston Motors Pty Ltd	(Australia) Reg Nutt (Australia) John Joyce (Australia) Lou Molina	Holden FJ	41
31	205	(Australia) H.A. Hines	(Australia) Bert Hines (Australia) Arthur Scholtz	Holden FJ	41
32	219	(Australia) Orrman's Service Station	(Australia) Kenneth Orrman (Australia) Ian Mountain	Peugeot 203	41
33	48	(Australia) S.M. Miller	(Australia) Sam Miller (Australia) Patrick Kelly (Australia) Albert Griffiths	1953 Ford Customline	45
34	95	(Australia) E.A. Gibson	(Australia) Eric Gibson (Australia) Leonard McGill (Australia) Allan Robshaw (Australia) John Roberts	1951 Chevrolet Deluxe	46
35	101	Rootes (Australia) Limited	(Australia) Anthony Peck (Australia) John Trowell (Australia) Robert Callander	Humber Super Snipe Mark IV	46
36	231	(Australia) Parade Motors	(Australia) Cecil Dix (Australia) Ronald Dix (Australia) Alec Dealtry	1947 Plymouth De Luxe	47
37	110	(Australia) G.N. Horner	(Australia) George Horner (Australia) Len Reay (Australia) Ken Worrall	1953 Ford Customline	48
38	150	(Australia) J.E. Pedley	(Australia) Joe Pedley (Australia) Stan Hill	Austin A70 Hereford	48
39	172	(Australia) Standard Motor Company	(Australia) Alan Pilkington (Australia) Wal Gillespie (Australia) Llyn Evans	Standard Vanguard Phase II	48
40	129	(Australia) P.E. Benson	(Australia) Peter Benson (Australia) Greg Percival (Australia) Bert Watson	Holden FJ	49
41	148	(Australia) Parker Brothers Auto Company	(Australia) Arthur Parker (Australia) Ron Tandy (Australia) John Parker	Holden FJ	49
42	181	Rootes (Australia) Limited	(Australia) Gilbert Graydon (Australia) Ian Logan (Australia) Ken Harper	Humber Super Snipe Mark IV	49
43	79	(Australia) C.M. McArdle	(Australia) Colin McArdle (Australia) Frank Sexton (Australia) Ray McNamara	Standard Vanguard Phase II	50
44	38	(Australia) Team Cox, Mackenzie and Smith	(Australia) Rowl Cox (Australia) Blyth Mackenzie (Australia) Clem Smith	Standard Vanguard Phase II	50
45	194	(Australia) M.D. Lawrence	(Australia) Michael Lawrence (Australia) William Gee (Australia) John Place (Australia) Bob Crewdson	Ford Zephyr Six	50
46	32	(Australia) C.A. Fulton	(Australia) Cecil Fulton (Australia) Neil Stewart (Australia) Norman Newton (Australia) Lester Minchin	Austin A70 Hereford	51
47	112	(Australia) Team Theil and Billing	(Australia) Ard Theil (Australia) Angus Billing	Holden FJ	51
48	252	(Australia) N.Q. Klingner	(Australia) Neville Klingner (Australia) Thomas Lonergan	Standard Vanguard Phase II	51
49	132	(Australia) R.K. Osmond	(Australia) Ron Osmond (Australia) Norman Smith (Australia) Ray Harvey	Holden FJ	52
50	154	(Australia) G.S. Onto	(Australia) Joe Kent (Australia) Kevin Mooney (Australia) Geoff Robbins	Lagonda 3-Litre	52
51	106	(Australia) Team Macmillan and Murray	(Australia) Joe Macmillan (Australia) Harry Murray	Peugeot 203	53
52	165	(Australia) Advanx (Gosford) Motor Service	(Australia) Robert Burgin (Australia) Roy Francis (Australia) Rob Boddenberg	Peugeot 203	56
53	214	(Australia) L.J. Coppock	(Australia) Launce Coppock (Australia) Neil Long	Holden FJ	56
54	173	(Australia) John Welsh	(Australia) John Welsh (Australia) Theodore Irwin (Australia) Alfred Rabone	Humber Super Snipe Mark IV	57
55	76	(Australia) Team Johnston, Rosevear and Lambert	(Australia) Ronald Johnston (Australia) Helen Rosevear (Australia) John Lambert	Standard Vanguard Phase II	58
56	162	(Australia) Preston Motors Pty Ltd	(Australia) Lex Davison (Australia) Peter Ward (Australia) Otto Stone	Holden FJ	58
57	68	(Australia) Jack Hay	(Australia) Jack Hay (Australia) Jack Thornton (Australia) Frank Heyward	Humber Super Snipe Mark IV	63
58	103	(Australia) C.V. Cresswell	(Australia) Charles Cresswell (Australia) Douglas Marshall (Australia) Neville Sutton	1947 Plymouth De Luxe	67
59	109	(Australia) Team Welinski and Wardell	(Australia) Andre Welinski (Australia) Laurence Ward (Australia) Taroslaw Tablonski	Holden FJ	67
60	125	(Australia) R.J. Williams	(Australia) Robert Williams (Australia) Milford Johnson (Australia) Ian Robertson	Holden FJ	67
61	177	(Australia) G.J. Perrignon	(Australia) George Perrignon (Australia) Bruce Hall (Australia) Roy Glenn	1953 Ford Customline	67
62	224	(Australia) Team Robinson, Brooks and McLeish	(Australia) Keith Robinson (Australia) William Brooks (Australia) Alan McLeish	Standard Vanguard Phase II	67
63	43	(Australia) Albert Correy	(Australia) Albert Correy (Australia) Arthur Anshaw	1946 Ford V8	68
64	56	(Australia) E.J. Ahren	(Australia) Eric Ahren (Australia) Hector Gray (Australia) Phillip Hancox	Holden 48-215	69
65	145	(Australia) Courtney and Patterson	(Australia) Leslie Courtney (Australia) Dennis Carroll	Ford Zephyr Six	70
66	121	(Australia) G.A. Birmingham	(Australia) George Birmingham (Australia) Ronald Callow (Australia) Ronald Hall	1954 DeSoto Powermaster	73
67	134	(Australia) R.H. Clarke	(Australia) Reg Clarke (Australia) Norman Neindorf (Australia) Harry Westcott (Australia) Ray Clarke	Holden 48-215	75
68	11	(Australia) Les Burrows	(Australia) Les Burrows (Australia) James Allen	Standard Vanguard Phase II	76
69	143	(Australia) Team Watt and Peniston	(Australia) Neil Watt (Australia) Arthur Peniston	Peugeot 203	78
70	208	(Australia) Malcolm Parr	(Australia) Malcolm Parr (Australia) Graeme Parr (Australia) James Costello	Standard Vanguard Phase II	81
71	105	(Australia) Miss S.E. Thorpe	(Australia) Sybil Thorpe (Australia) John Diamond (Australia) Douglas Evans	Holden FJ	82
72	113	(Australia) Reg and Francis Thomas	(Australia) Reg Thomas (Australia) Francis Thomas	Ford Zephyr Six	83
73	35	(Australia) V.R. Burton	(Australia) Viv Burton (Australia) Wesley Burton	Morris Oxford Series MO	84
74	133	(Australia) Ride-Ezy Shock Absorber Specialists	(Australia) Harry Walker (Australia) Horrie Waters (Australia) George Walsh	Ford Consul	86
75	40	(Australia) R.F. Rothwell	(Australia) Roy Rothwell (Australia) Hugh Rothwell (Australia) Colin Mitchell	Holden 48-215	89
76	257	(Australia) J.T. Belling	(Australia) John Belling (Australia) Robert Peake (Australia) Forbes Cumming	Ford Zephyr Six	89
77	237	(Australia) H.E. Budd	(Australia) Harry Budd (Australia) Dave Sullivan	Holden 48-215	92
78	170	(Australia) P.R. Williams Pty Ltd	(Australia) Donald Bain (Australia) Les Slaughter	MG TD Midget	96
79	4	(Australia) Team Akers and Thallon	(Australia) Ron Akers (Australia) Keith Thallon	Citroën Light 15	100
80	138	(Australia) Mick Simmons Limited	(Australia) Leslie Miller (Australia) Arthur Green	Ford Zephyr Six	103
81	163	(Australia) E.B. Perkins	(Australia) Eddie Perkins (Australia) Lance Perkins	Rover 90	108
82	235	(Australia) Team Harrison and Saunders	(Australia) Ken Harrison (Australia) Gerald Saunders (Australia) Allan Ward	Standard Vanguard Phase I	109
83	169	(Australia) F.J. Shepherd	(Australia) Fred Shepherd (Australia) Keith Johnson (Australia) James Power	Holden 48-215	131
84	94	(Australia) Team McDonald and Schulze	(Australia) David McDonald (Australia) Robert Schulze	Ford Consul	135
85	114	(Australia) Stanley Carpenter	(Australia) Stanley Carpenter (Australia) Hilda Carpenter	Ford Zephyr Six	135
86	37	(Australia) Dan Evans	(Australia) Dan Evans (Australia) Neville Somers (Australia) Snow Sefton	Ford Zephyr Six	148
87	17	(Australia) Team Campbell and McBride	(Australia) George Campbell (Australia) Allan Murphy (Australia) Jack McBride	1947 Ford V8	158
88	229	(Australia) Team Cooke and Saville	(Australia) William Cooke (Australia) Norm Saville	Peugeot 203	164
89	66	(Australia) J.G. Anderson	(Australia) James Anderson (Australia) Charles Anderson	Austin A70 Hereford	170
90	261	(Australia) Phillips Brothers	(Australia) J. Phillips (Australia) A. Phillips	Holden FJ	180
91	258	(Australia) J.A. Bicket	(Australia) John Bicket (Australia) John Andrew	Peugeot 203	184
92	216	(Australia) C.A. Edgar	(Australia) Cec Edgar (Australia) Jack Jorgensen	Austin A40 Devon	200
93	168	(Australia) D.G. Barnett	(Australia) Douglas Barnett (Australia) William Jones (Australia) Roy Woodham	1949 Ford Custom	210
94	144	(Australia) M.G. Seike	(Australia) Maurie Seike (Australia) John Knight (Australia) Neville Sheppeard	1946 Ford V8	216
95	70	(Australia) R.E. Wilson	(Australia) Ralph Wilson (Australia) James Wilson	Volkswagen 1100	236
96	245	(Australia) A.W. Standfield	(Australia) Wes Standfield (Australia) Ron Standfield	Standard Vanguard Phase II	248
97	233	(Australia) Christie's Motors	(Australia) Ray Christie (Australia) Ken Christie (Australia) Stan Christie	1952 Chevrolet Deluxe	273
98	80	(Australia) R.E. Gudgeon	(Australia) Bob Gudgeon (Australia) Alan Platt	Hudson Super Wasp	276
99	182	(Australia) J.H. Farrow	(Australia) James Farrow (Australia) Gary Fuller (Australia) E. Grey (Australia) Peter Wieland	1947 Mercury Eight	286
100	36	(Australia) Christys Motor Auctions	(Australia) Tom Mills (Australia) Jack O'Hara (Australia) Bert Easterbrook	1946 Chevrolet Deluxe	315
101	221	(Australia) David Raven	(Australia) David Raven (Australia) Harry Tregilgas (Australia) Ray Hall	Holden FJ	316
102	220	(Australia) W.H. Crockford	(Australia) William Crockford (Australia) William Chambers (Australia) Bill Huggett	1946 Ford V8	336
103	63	(Australia) Team Kreig and Sanders	(Australia) Ross Kreig (Australia) Ronald Sanders (Australia) Ronald Treloar	Holden FJ	338
104	89	(Australia) R.E. Pryer	(Australia) Bon Pryer (Australia) David Pinkard	MG Y Tourer	358
105	72	(Australia) Herbert Happ	(Australia) Herbert Happ (Australia) Rowan Grissi (Australia) Charles Sexton	Holden 48-215	447
106	187	(Australia) Century Storage Battery Company	(Australia) Keith Winstanley (Australia) Cecil Curtis (Australia) Frank Lewis	Holden FJ	456
107	64	(Australia) Stephen Gibbs	(Australia) Stephen Gibbs (Australia) Douglas Thornton (Australia) Allen Nixon	Ford Zephyr Six	462
108	159	(Australia) M.L. Arentz	(Australia) Martin Arentz (Australia) Ray Davie (Australia) Sid Cresswell	1953 Ford Customline	480
109	190	(Australia) N. Shean	(Australia) David McKay (Australia) Barry Gurdon	Austin A70 Hereford	522
110	74	(Australia) John Perkins	(Australia) John Perkins (Australia) David White (Australia) William Tennent	Holden FJ	563
111	119	(Australia) Consolidated Press Limited	(Australia) Bill Buchanan (Australia) John Larkin (Australia) John Wawn	Austin A70 Hereford	596
112	44	(Australia) A.G. Melrose	(Australia) Aubrey Melrose (Australia) George Wakelin	Austin A70 Hereford	622
113	23	(Australia) Team Holland, Payne and Playfair	(Australia) Allan Holland (Australia) Sel Payne (Australia) Bob Playfair	Holden 48-215	705
114	60	(Australia) 'Mac' Hicks	(Australia) 'Mac' Hicks (Australia) Eric Scott (Australia) Fred Strachan	1953 Ford Customline	722
115	91	(Australia) Wattle Corrie Motors	(Australia) Patrick O'Sullivan (Australia) George Davidson (Australia) Victor Walters	Holden 48-215	835
116	140	(Australia) Manly Pacific Garage	(Australia) Ronald Green (Australia) Jack Scharkie (Australia) Keith Wilson	Peugeot 203	855
117	116	(Australia) D.A. McLachlan	(Australia) Bill McLachlan (Australia) Marie Higgs (Australia) Malcolm McKay	Ford Zephyr Six	978
118	201	(Australia) Team Lee and Hamilton	(Australia) Digger Lee (Australia) Richard Hamilton (Australia) Doug Carle	Vauxhall Vagabond	991
119	236	(Australia) Mrs Edith Nielsen	(Australia) Edith Nielsen (Australia) Gwendoline Bagust (Australia) John Carson	Peugeot 203	1,209
120	6	(Australia) G.P. Setter	(Australia) George Setter (Australia) Bernard McGrath (Australia) Gerald Downing	Ford Zephyr Six	1,242
