= 1955 Round Australia Trial =

1955 Round Australia Trial Redex Trial
← Previous event	Next event →
- Host country: Australia
- Rally base: Sydney
- Dates run: 21 August – 11 September 1955
- Stages: 17
- Stage surface: Tarmac and Gravel
- Overall distance: 16,900 km (10,500 miles)

Statistics
- Crews: 176 at start, 54 at finish

Overall results
- Overall winner: (Australia) Laurie Whitehead (Australia) Bob Foreman (Australia) Regent Motors Pty Ltd

The 1955 Round Australia Trial, officially the Redex Trial, was the third running of the Round Australia Trial. The rally took place between 21 August and 11 September 1955. The event covered 16,900 kilometres around Australia. It was won by Laurie Whitehead and Bob Foreman, driving a Volkswagen 1200.

== Results ==
Pos	No	Entrant	Drivers	Car	Penalties (Points)
1	90	(Australia) Regent Motors Pty Ltd	(Australia) Laurie Whitehead (Australia) Bob Foreman	Volkswagen 1200	21
2	2	(Australia) E.B. Perkins	(Australia) Eddie Perkins (Australia) Lance Perkins	Volkswagen 1200	27
3	60	(Australia) Regal Motors Pty Ltd	(Australia) Malcolm Brooks (Australia) Frank Tate	Standard Vanguard Phase II	45
4	133	(Australia) W.H. Hayes	(Australia) William Hayes (Australia) Tom Quill	Ford 1954 Customline	161
5	83	(Australia) Carl Kennedy	(Australia) Carl Kennedy (Australia) Bill Turner	Peugeot 203	236
6	38	(Australia) Greig and Lloyd Kook	(Australia) Greig Kook (Australia) Sidney Braithwaite (Australia) Lloyd Kook	Standard Vanguard Phase II	399
7	89	(Australia) D.A. McLachlan	(Australia) Bill McLachlan (Australia) Marie McLachlan	Ford 1954 Customline	506
8	101	(Australia) Bill Edmonds	(Australia) Bill Edmonds (Australia) Eric Keft	Standard Vanguard Phase II	591
9	152	(Australia) Advanx (Gosford) Motor Service Pty Ltd	(Australia) Robert Burgin (Australia) Sam Griffiths	Peugeot 203	622
10	164	(Australia) F.E. McMahon	(Australia) Francis McMahon (Australia) Bruce Creber (Australia) Pat Joyce	Mercury 1948 Eight	656
11	169	(Australia) Team Hines and Eastlake	(Australia) Bert Hines (Australia) Frank Eastlake (Australia) Glen Tippett	Holden FJ	699
12	72	(Australia) W.L. Pitt	(Australia) Bill Pitt (Australia) Walter Anderson (Australia) Richard Howard	Morris Oxford Series II	725
13	55	(Australia) Manly Pacific Garage	(Australia) Ronald Green (Australia) Jack Scharkie	Peugeot 203	740
14	154	(Australia) Robert Sears	(Australia) Robert Sears (Australia) Unknown	Peugeot 203	750
15	99	(Australia) Team Fraser and McLoughlin	(Australia) Rod Fraser (Australia) Colin McLoughlin	Volkswagen 1200	773
16	136	(Australia) F.W. Hecker	(Australia) Sam Hecker (Australia) Arthur Griffiths (Australia) Norwood Warry	Holden FJ	795
17	174	(Australia) Team Watt and Peniston	(Australia) Neil Watt (Australia) Arthur Peniston	Peugeot 203	847
18	74	(Australia) NSW Country Holden Dealers	(Australia) Ken Miller (Australia) Terry Wheatley (Australia) Harry Cape	Holden FJ	965
19	59	(Australia) W.A. Rudder	(Australia) W. Rudder (Australia) Raymond Pickett (Australia) M. Somerville	Humber Super Snipe Mark IV	1,020
20	76	(Australia) Christey's Motor Auctions Pty Ltd	(Australia) Tom Mills (Australia) Jack O'Hara (Australia) Bert Easterbrook	Ford 1954 Customline	1,114
21	125	(Australia) D.A. Pollack	(Australia) Kevin Pollack (Australia) Donald Pollack (Australia) John Sample	Ford Zephyr Six	1,132
22	167	(Australia) J. Lefoe and R.S. Upton Pty Ltd	(Australia) John Lefoe (Australia) Evan Green	Standard Vanguard Phase II	1,245
23	140	(Australia) Richardson and Kirwan Pty Ltd	(Australia) Val Richardson (Australia) Max Kirwan (Australia) Bob Crewdson	Humber Super Snipe Mark IV	1,249
24	12	(Australia) A.A. Johns	(Australia) Tony Johns (Australia) Patrick O'Conner	Peugeot 203	1,281
25	67	(Australia) 'Possum' Kipling	(Australia) 'Possum' Kipling (Australia) Leigh Stevens (Australia) Les March	Holden FJ	1,299
26	107	(Australia) Koroit Motors	(Australia) Eric Richardson (Australia) Gordon McDowell (Australia) Ian Crockford	Holden FJ	1,359
27	134	(Australia) Team Belling, Cumming and Peake	(Australia) John Belling (Australia) Forbes Cumming (Australia) Robert Peake	Ford Zephyr Six	1,363
28	31	(Australia) Gordon Bray	(Australia) Gordon Bray (Australia) Sandy Raywood	Peugeot 203	1,422
29	62	(Australia) Team Smith and McCrohon	(Australia) Ross Smith (Australia) Keith McCrohon (Australia) Chris Higgins	Standard Vanguard Phase II	1,499
30	48	(Australia) J.R. Hall	(Australia) John Hall (Australia) George Reynolds	Volkswagen 1200	1,516
31	58	(Australia) Mrs C. Hayes	(Australia) 'Granny' Hayes (Australia) George Ross (Australia) Jack Ricardi	Volkswagen 1200	1,653
32	54	(Australia) Young's Car Sales	(Australia) Robert Young (Australia) Jack Vaughan	Volkswagen 1200	1,678
33	102	(Australia) Jack Hay	(Australia) Jack Hay (Australia) Arch Heyward	Standard Vanguard Phase II	1,702
34	173	(Australia) Major Warwick	(Australia) Major Warwick (Australia) Joseph Little	Škoda 1101	1,837
35	1	(Australia) A.W. Standfield	(Australia) Wes Standfield (Australia) Ron Standfield	Standard Vanguard Phase II	1,882
36	158	(Australia) D.H. Antill	(Australia) Peter Antill (Australia) George Reed (Australia) Max Winkless	Plymouth 1955 Savoy	1,926
37	108	(Australia) Goodfellow Brothers	(Australia) Horace Goodfellow (Australia) Leo Goodfellow	Standard Vanguard Phase II	1,973
38	168	(Australia) K.F. Thallon	(Australia) Keith Thallon (Australia) Ike Stubbin (Australia) Graham Richter	Standard Vanguard Phase II	2,054
39	141	(Australia) E.A. Gibson	(Australia) Eric Gibson (Australia) Leonard McGill (Australia) James Whelan (Australia) Arch Nicholson	Chevrolet 1951 Deluxe	2,222
40	170	(Australia) Team Allen and McComb	(Australia) James Allen (Australia) Raymond Allen (Australia) Gordon McComb	Standard Vanguard Phase II	2,266
41	118	(Australia) Stewart Alexander	(Australia) Stewart Alexander (Australia) John Hillman (Australia) Selwyn Murphy	Dodge 1948 Deluxe	2,292
42	39	(Australia) Jim Hirst	(Australia) Jim Hirst (Australia) Geoff Chew	Standard Vanguard Phase II	2,358
43	6	(Australia) Rex Parkinson	(Australia) Rex Parkinson (Australia) John Hope (Australia) Tony Lucas	Holden FJ	2,508
44	94	(Australia) Tom Farrell	(Australia) Tom Farrell (Australia) Frank Denlay (Australia) John Jones	Ford 1954 Customline	2,689
45	111	(Australia) R.J. Williams	(Australia) Robert Williams (Australia) Milford Johnson (Australia) Ian Robertson	Holden FJ	2,709
46	25	(Australia) J.E. Pedley	(Australia) Joe Pedley (Australia) Maxwell Oliver	Austin A50	2,745
47	50	(Australia) J.F. McCafferty	(Australia) John McCafferty (Australia) Peter Richardson (Australia) John McKinney	Holden FJ	3,310
48	20	(Australia) K.V. Tubman	(Australia) Ken Tubman (Australia) Ken Pleasant	Standard Vanguard Phase II	3,327
49	44	(Australia) Ride-Esi Shock Absorbers	(Australia) Harry Walker (Australia) George Walsh (Australia) Arthur Green	Ford Zephyr Six	3,472
50	115	(Australia) D.T. Murray	(Australia) Des Murray (Australia) Unknown	Holden FJ	3,894
51	126	(Australia) C.A. Fulton	(Australia) Cecil Fulton (Australia) Neil Stewart (Australia) Thomas Cawdroy	Austin A70 Hereford	4,068
52	137	(Australia) 'Pop' Morgan	(Australia) 'Pop' Morgan (Australia) Neville Bird	Standard Vanguard Phase II	4,691
53	36	(Australia) Lenaghan's Belmont Taxis	(Australia) Elaine Lenaghan (Australia) Reg Lenaghan	Holden FJ	5,127
54	113	(Australia) W.J. Robinson	(Australia) Bill Robinson (Australia) Barry Bolton	Holden 48-215	6,483
