= 1941 Ford =

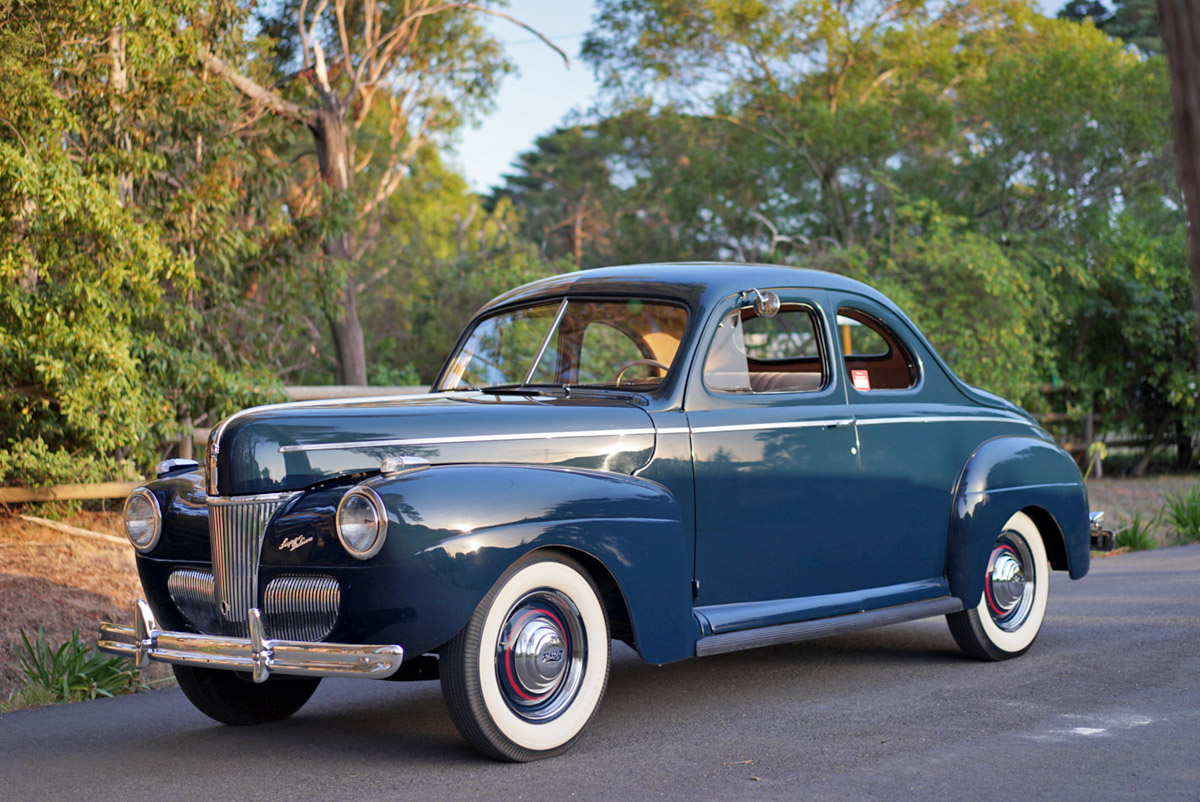
- 1941 Ford Super Deluxe Business Coupe

Overview
- Manufacturer: Ford
- Production: 1941–1942, 1946–1948
- Model years: 1941–1942, 1946–1948
- Assembly: Main plant; Dearborn, MI; Branch Assembly; Twin Cities, MN; Somerville, MA; Richmond, CA; Norfolk, VA; Memphis, TN; Louisville, KY; Long Beach, CA; Kansas City, MO; Edgewater, NJ; Dallas, TX; Chicago, IL; Chester, PA; Buffalo, NY; Atlanta, GA; Argentina; Australia

Body and chassis
- Class: Full-size Ford
- Body style: 2-door coupe 2-door convertible 2-door coupé utility (Australia only); 2-door sedan delivery 2-door pickup truck 2-door sedan 4-door sedan 4-door station wagon
- Layout: FR layout

Powertrain
- Engine: 226 CID 3.70 L 90 hp (67 kW; 91 PS) L-head I6; 221 cu in (3.62 L) Flathead V8; 239 cu in (3.92 L) Flathead V8
- Transmission: 3-speed sliding-mesh manual

Dimensions
- Wheelbase: 114 in (2,900 mm)
- Length: 194.3 in (4,940 mm)

Chronology
- Predecessor: 1937 Ford
- Successor: 1949 Ford; Ford F-Series first generation (pickup trucks)

The Ford car was thoroughly updated in 1941, in preparation for a time of unpredictability surrounding World War II. The 1941 design would continue in an aborted 1942 model year and would be restarted in 1946 and produced until 1948 when the more modern 1949 Fords were ready. During the initial year of this car, it evolved considerably. The front fenders came in three pieces, the theory being that small damages could be replaced easily. During the year, it evolved into two pieces with the lower front and back sections being joined. The hood risers changed, the early ones being the same as 1940 Fords, changing during the year to the better later version. The 1941 Convertible had no rear side windows, the only side windows being in the doors; in 1942, quarter windows were added so the rear occupants could see out.

Five different coil/distributor arrangements were used during 1941, causing confusion for mechanics. Other variations were: two different positions for the generator, and three for the cooling fan — front of the crankshaft, front of the generator (rare) and on a bracket. This is thought to be the first Ford to offer a replaceable cartridge oil filter as an option. The two interior heaters were a "Southwind" gasoline burner, which had the advantage of keeping one warm in winter at drive-in movies (provided a small electric fuel pump was used), and a more ordinary hot-water type. Both had window defrosters. Electric windshield wipers were available in addition to the vacuum-powered wipers. Three different convertible power top mechanisms (vacuum, electric screw, and hydraulic) and two different header bar latching systems were used. Rear suspensions sometimes had a sway bar, most did not. It served a transitional role in Ford’s lineup.

== Design ==
The two previous Ford car lines, Standard and De Luxe, had blossomed into three, Special, De Luxe, and Super De Luxe. Ford vehicles had been V8-only since 1935, but dealer requests for an "economy" engine option prompted the introduction of a six cylinder unit. The entry-level 136 cu in (2.23 L) V8 was switched in favor of a new 226 CID 3.70 L L-head straight-6, the first Ford six since the 1906 Model K. The popular 221 cu in (3.62 L) V8 remained as the top-line engine and was standard in De Luxe models. Both engines were rated at 90 hp. The 239 CID engine, introduced in 1939 for Mercury and trucks, was continued in the Mercury models. The chassis was longer, with a 114 in (2,900 mm) wheelbase.

The "ignition key" for these cars was actually used to operate a bolt lock which, on one end, unlocked the steering column (a feature destined to return, mandated, decades later), and on the other end unblocked the ignition switch, allowing it to be operated. Starting the car was then accomplished by pressing a pushbutton on the dashboard, another feature destined to return with the advent of "smart keys".

Although starting cranks had been replaced by electric starters for decades, Ford cars included a manual starting feature until 1948 as an antidote to dead-battery syndrome. The wheel-lug wrench served as a handle (also for the jack) and the jack shaft with bayonet-coupling pins could be inserted through a small hole in the grille to engage a bayonet socket on the forward end of the engine crankshaft. A quick-and-easy twist of the handle was sufficient to start the flat head V8, and the bayonet coupling was self-disengaging for safety.

== 1941 ==
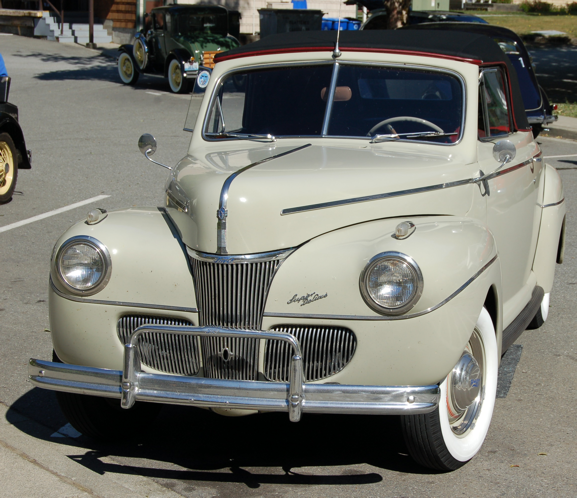
1941 Ford Super Deluxe Convertible Coupe

Fords for 1941 were much more modern with a wide body that nearly covered the running boards. The front and rear fenders were still pronounced, but were now integrated more into the body and the headlights were pushed all the way up and out over the front wheels. The 1941 grille was a three-part affair with a tall center section bookended by twin kidneys low on the fenders and vertical bars all around. The 1941 was a bigger car with a 194.3 in (4,940 mm) overall length and a width increased to 73.12-in. Body styles included two-door and four-door sedans, a sedan coupe, a business coupe, and convertible coupe, sedan delivery wagon, and woody station wagon. The Super Deluxe had several amenities of higher quality over the base models, including more chrome, leather seats, and a wood-grain dashboard. The pickup truck continued with the 1940 standard Ford styling. Production of the 1941 models was disrupted by a sudden labor strike in April 1941; Henry Ford, having resisted unionization well after the rest of the American automobile industry accepted it, finally gave in and signed a contract with the UAW.

== 1942 ==
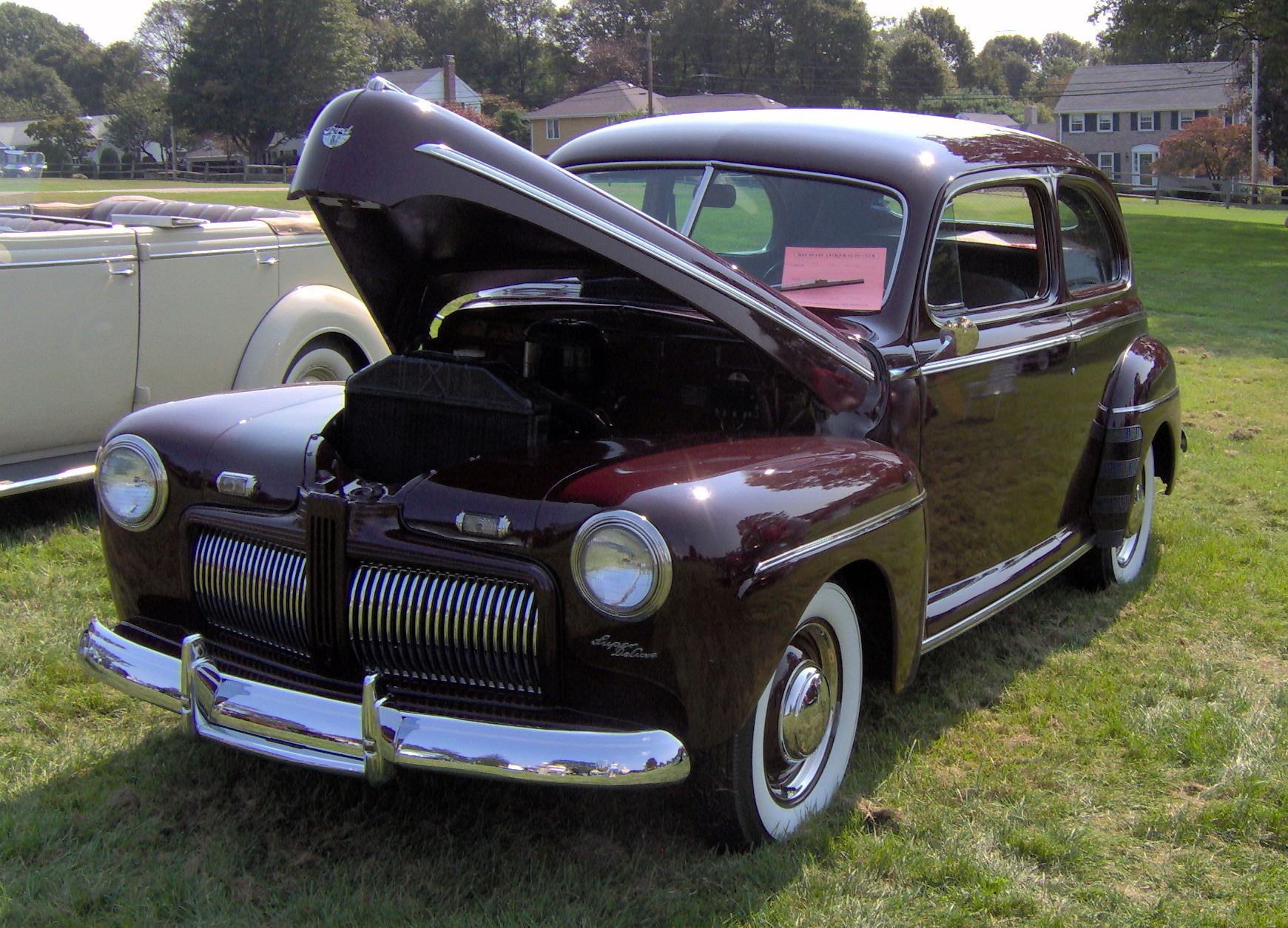
1942 Ford Super Deluxe Tudor Sedan

The 1942 model year lasted only four months before the government ordered a halt to civilian automobile production starting on February 10, 1942. Changes were made to the car besides a three-part "electric shaver" grille — and the parking lights were moved from the top of the fenders to between the grille and headlights. Tail lights were enlarged and moved from vertical to horizontal. The frame was lowered and softer springs were used to improve the ride. The dashboard was changed, moving the radio from the top of the dash to low down, and the linear speedometer and clock were replaced with round ones. The radio had an optional floor button so the driver could change preselected stations without using hands. War rationing required auto makers to black out their chrome trim - Ford used silver paint - and a special four-door model was produced with no chrome at all for military use. The pickup received new styling, as well, with heavy vertical bars, and truck production lasted through March 3.

The 1942-style Ford cars continued to be produced as military staff cars from March 1942 through summer 1945. These would have been registered as 1942, 1943, 1944, and 1945 models. Additionally, a large number of 1942 (and a few 1941) cars, held in dealer stocks by government edict for issuance to essential users during the conflict, were Fords. Some states titled cars by the year of sale, so it is possible to find 1943, 1944, and 1945 models by virtue of their registrations and titles.

== 1946 ==
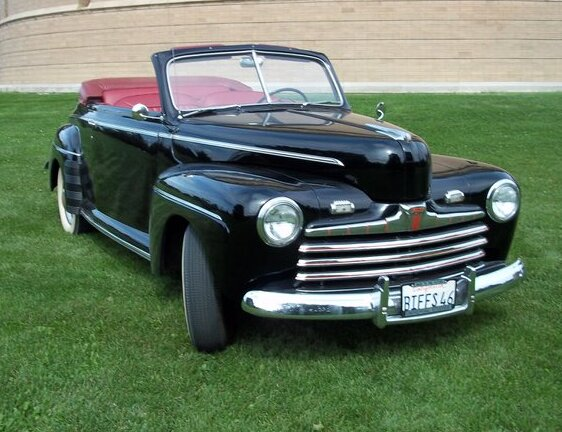
Biff Tannen's 1946 Ford Super De Luxe Convertible Club Coupe from the Back to the Future franchise.

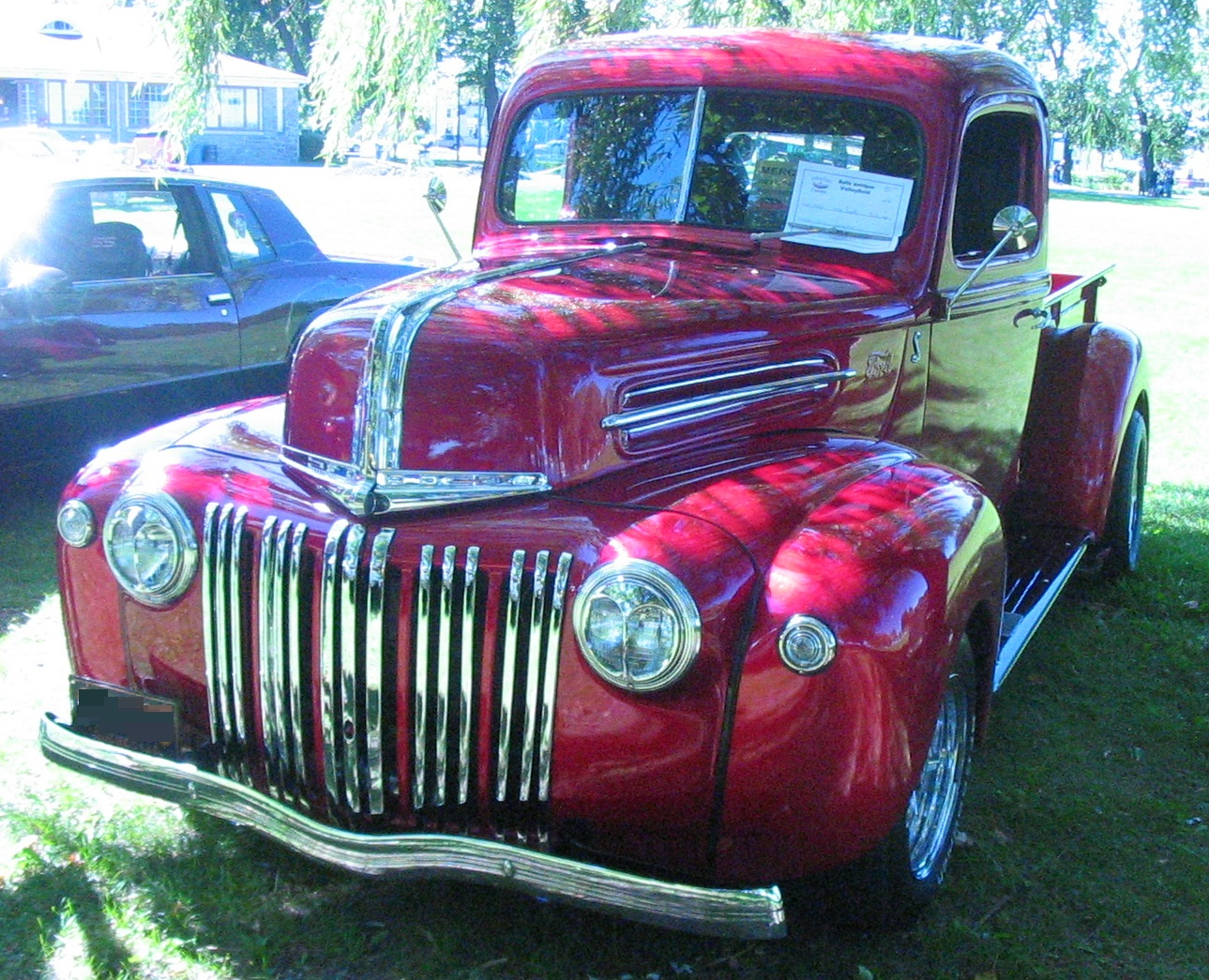
A 1946 Ford pickup.

Following the official surrender of Japan in September 1945, civilian car production slowly resumed. The 1946 Ford was identical to the 1942 model under the skin, though a heavy new grille with horizontal bars and red accents refreshed the styling. The hood was widened by adding a center strip. One notable change was to use the 239 CID engine which since 1939 had been used in Mercurys and trucks, and capable of 100 hp (75 kW) for the first time. Ford also produced a distinctive "Sportsman" convertible with wood side panels, supplied from the Ford Iron Mountain Plant. The convertible had an electric top instead of manual.

In the 1985 film Back to the Future and its sequel Back to the Future Part II, the car which Biff Tannen owns in 1955 was a black 1946 Ford Super De Luxe convertible. In Back to the Future, during the skateboard chase scene, based on the park lights, some shots are a 1946 model year, whereas others are a 1947 model year. Looking at the "top boot" area shape, it appears the 1947 is a real convertible, and the 1946 with the manure on it is a coupe with its top removed to resemble a convertible. In Back to the Future: Part II, some trim is different, suggesting a possible third car. After the film, the car was kept by Universal and displayed in their back lot tour. The 1946 car is now in a private collection.

A 1946 woodie station wagon model was specifically selected by Jim Henson for use in the 1979 film The Muppet Movie.

== 1947 ==
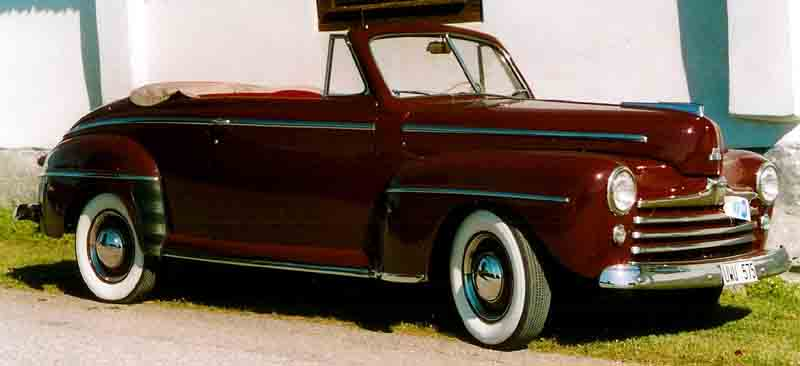
A 1947 Ford convertible

The 1947 Ford line was similar to the short 1946. Visual differences included the removal of the red accents from the grille and the two small lights located just above it. Ford began titling 1947s in February 1947. For the first few weeks, the 1947 model was identical to the 1946. Ford then restyled the body slightly first by moving the parking lights from above the grille to below each headlight. Exterior moldings were changed from grooved to a smooth design. A new hood ornament with a blue plastic insert was installed. A new hubcap design became available in March. The interior dash color was changed from red accent to gold. By September, the roof-mounted antenna was moved to the cowl. Horns were moved to in front of the radiator from the engine compartment. The final 1947 models were titled in November.

In the 1984 film The Karate Kid, Mr. Miyagi gives Daniel LaRusso a cream-colored 1947 Ford Super DeLuxe convertible as a birthday gift. The car was actually a gift to Ralph Macchio from the film's producer. To this day, Macchio still owns the car.

== 1948 ==
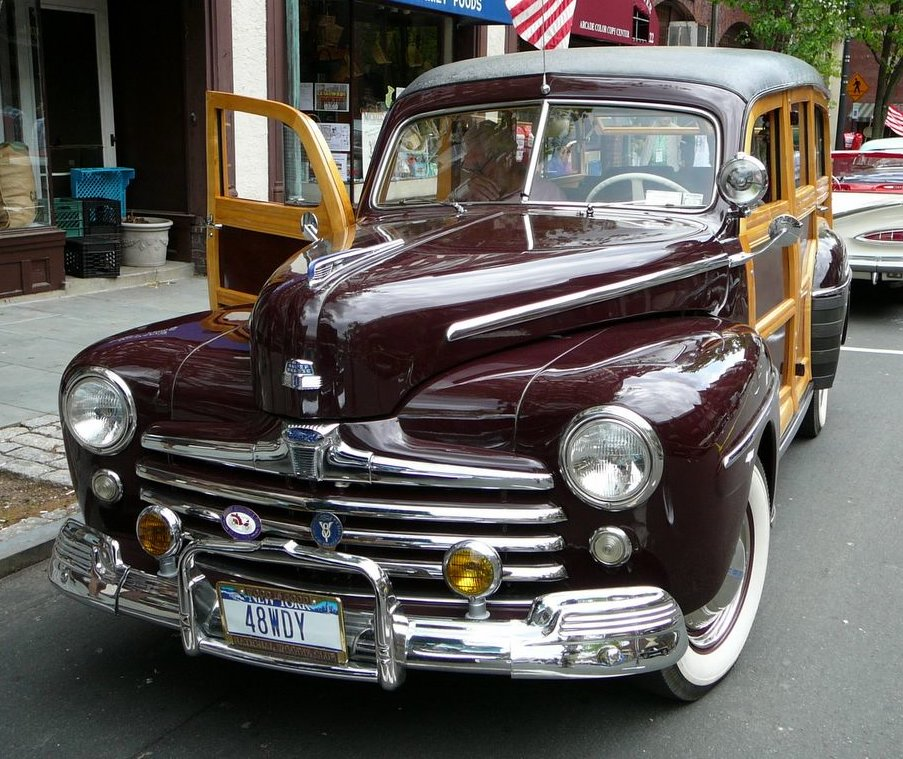
A 1948 Ford woodie station wagon, one of the last of the all-wood bodied wagons

The final year for the old-style Ford was 1948, with an all-new model launched partway through the year. The wood-sided Sportsman convertible, supplied by the Ford Iron Mountain Plant, ended the year with just 28 built, and the all-wood bodies on the woody station wagons were replaced with steel for the 1949 season. The F-Series truck model designations began this year. With Ford in financial chaos during this period, sales fell well behind Chevrolet—Ford output for 1948 was 430,198 vehicles, only about 62% of Chevrolet's output, and Plymouth came close to knocking Ford from second place with an output of 412,540 vehicles.

The car used in the 1978 film Grease is a 1948 Ford DeLuxe.

== Australian production ==
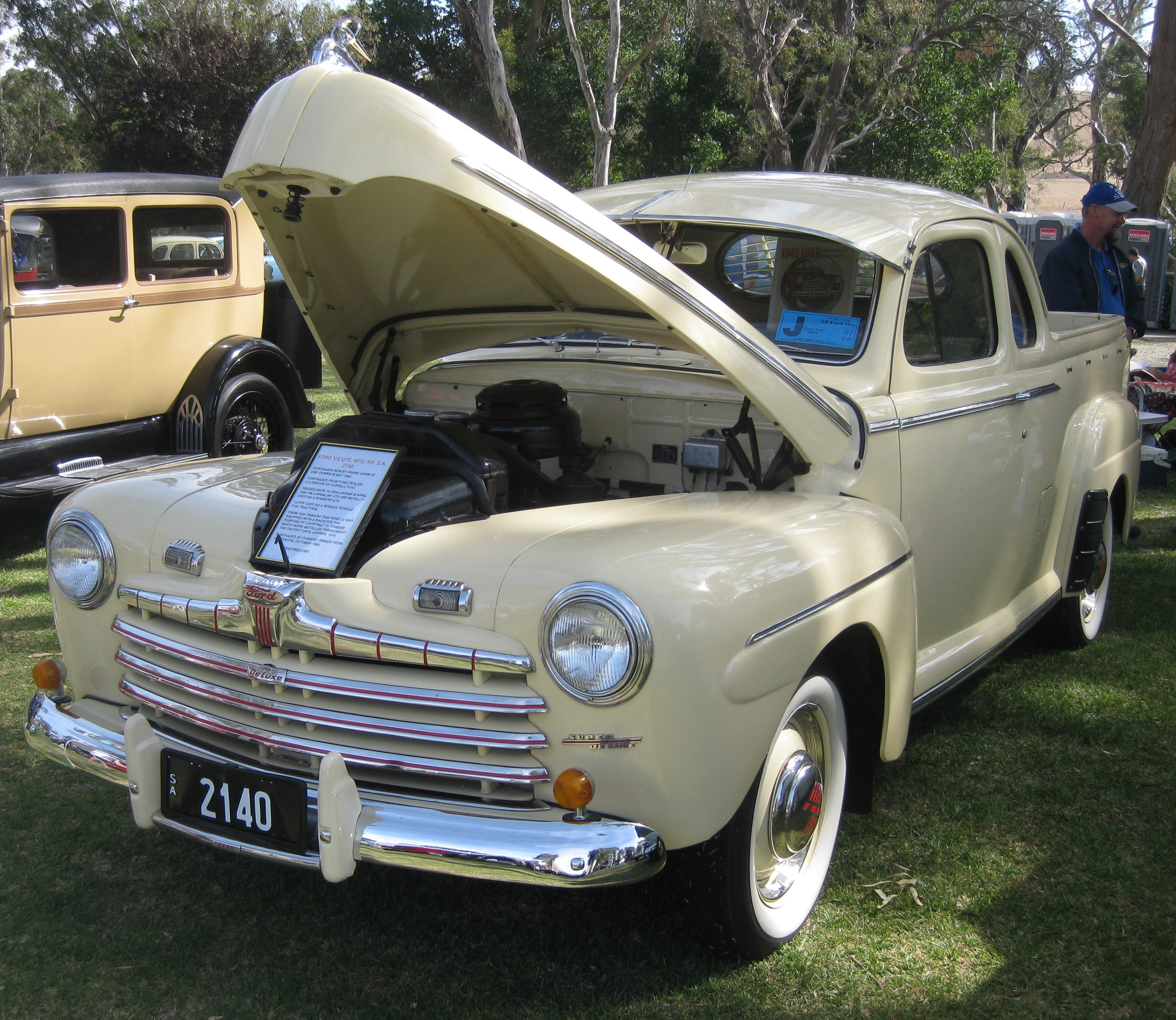
Australian-built 1946 Ford V8 Coupe Utility

The 1941 Ford was also produced in Australia by Ford Australia in V8 sedan and V8 coupé utility models. Revised 1942 models followed, although only 138 examples were produced.

Australian production recommenced in 1946 with V8 Sedan, Coupe Utility and Panel Van models released and minor updates followed in 1947 and 1948. The Panel Van was discontinued in 1948 and the Sedan and Coupe Utility were replaced by the 1949 models in September 1948.
