= Peugeot 203 =

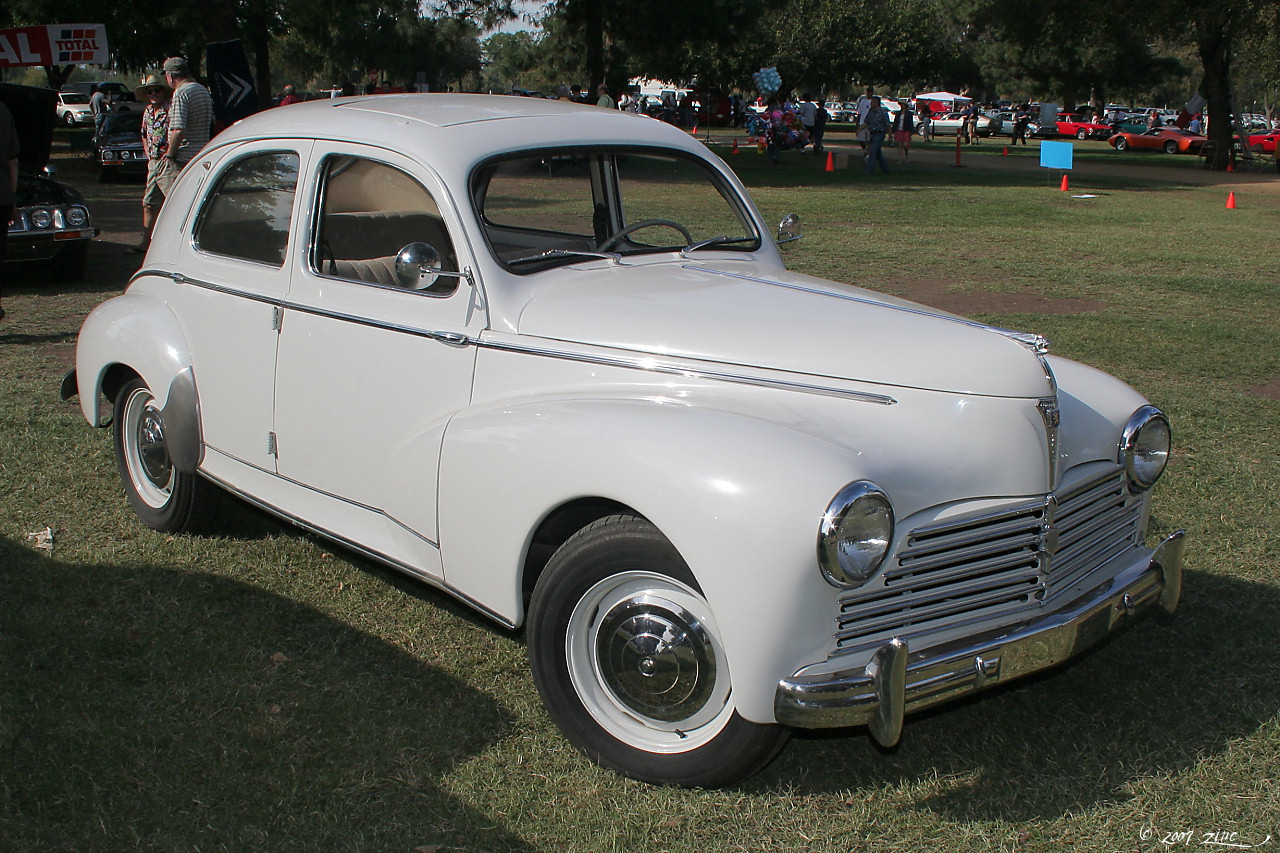

Overview
- Manufacturer: Peugeot SA
- Production: 1948 – February 1960; 685,628 produced
- Assembly: France: Sochaux (Sochaux Plant); Australia: Melbourne

Body and chassis
- Class: Small family car (C)
- Body style: 4-door saloon; 5-door estate; 2-door cabriolet; 4-door cabriolet; 2-door coupé
- Layout: FR layout

Powertrain
- Engine: 1290 cc TM I4

Dimensions
- Wheelbase: 2,580 mm (101.6 in) saloon 2,780 mm (109.4 in) estate
- Length: 4,350 mm (171.3 in) saloon 4,530 mm (178.3 in) estate
- Width: 1,620 mm (63.8 in)
- Height: 1,500 mm (59.1 in)

Chronology
- Predecessor: Peugeot 202
- Successor: Peugeot 403; Peugeot 204

The Peugeot 203 is a small family car which was produced by the French car manufacturer Peugeot between 1948 and 1960.

The car was exhibited at the Paris Motor Show in 1947, but by then had already been under development for more than five years. Volume manufacturing was initially hampered by strikes and shortages of materials, but production got under way late in 1948, with buyers taking delivery of 203s from early 1949.

The 203 was Peugeot's first new model launched after World War II. During its twelve-year production run nearly 700,000 203s were assembled in Sochaux, France. Between the demise of the 202 in 1949 and the launch of the 403 in 1955, the 203 was the only model produced by Peugeot.

== The body ==
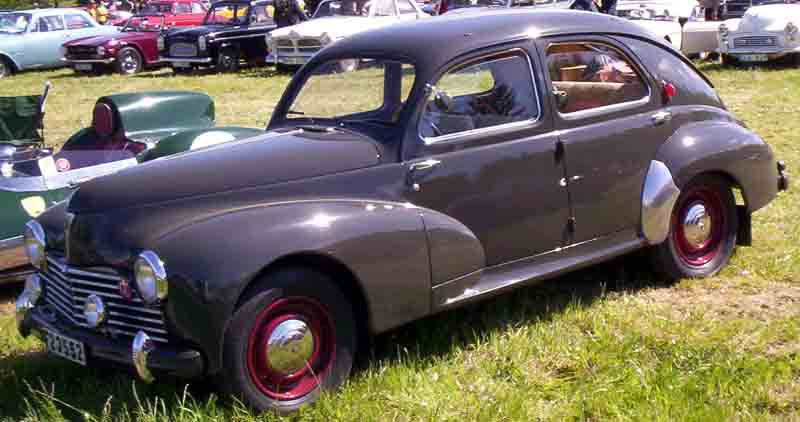
Peugeot 203 4-door Berline (1948–1952)

The 203 was the first monocoque bodied production Peugeot. The car was eye catchingly modern and bore a marked resemblance to the American Chevrolet Fleetline fastback, although its wind cheating profile also reflected the streamlining trend apparent in some of Europe's more modern designs, including some of Peugeot's own 402 model, from the 1930s.

The 4-door saloon was the major seller, but from 1950 a commodious 4-door version (Commerciale) and a 6-seat (Familiale), with three rows of seats, were also offered on a wheelbase lengthened by 20 cm (7.9 in) to 278 cm (109.4 in). By taking the trouble to extend the wheelbase for the estate and family versions, the company set a pattern which they would follow with several succeeding generations of large family Peugeot estates such as the 404 and 504.

In October 1952 the Paris Motor Show welcomed a modified 203 which now featured hinged quarter light windows on the front ends of the front doors and an enlarged rear window on the saloon versions. This upgrade also saw the removal of the speedometer from the centre of the dashboard to a position directly ahead of the driver.

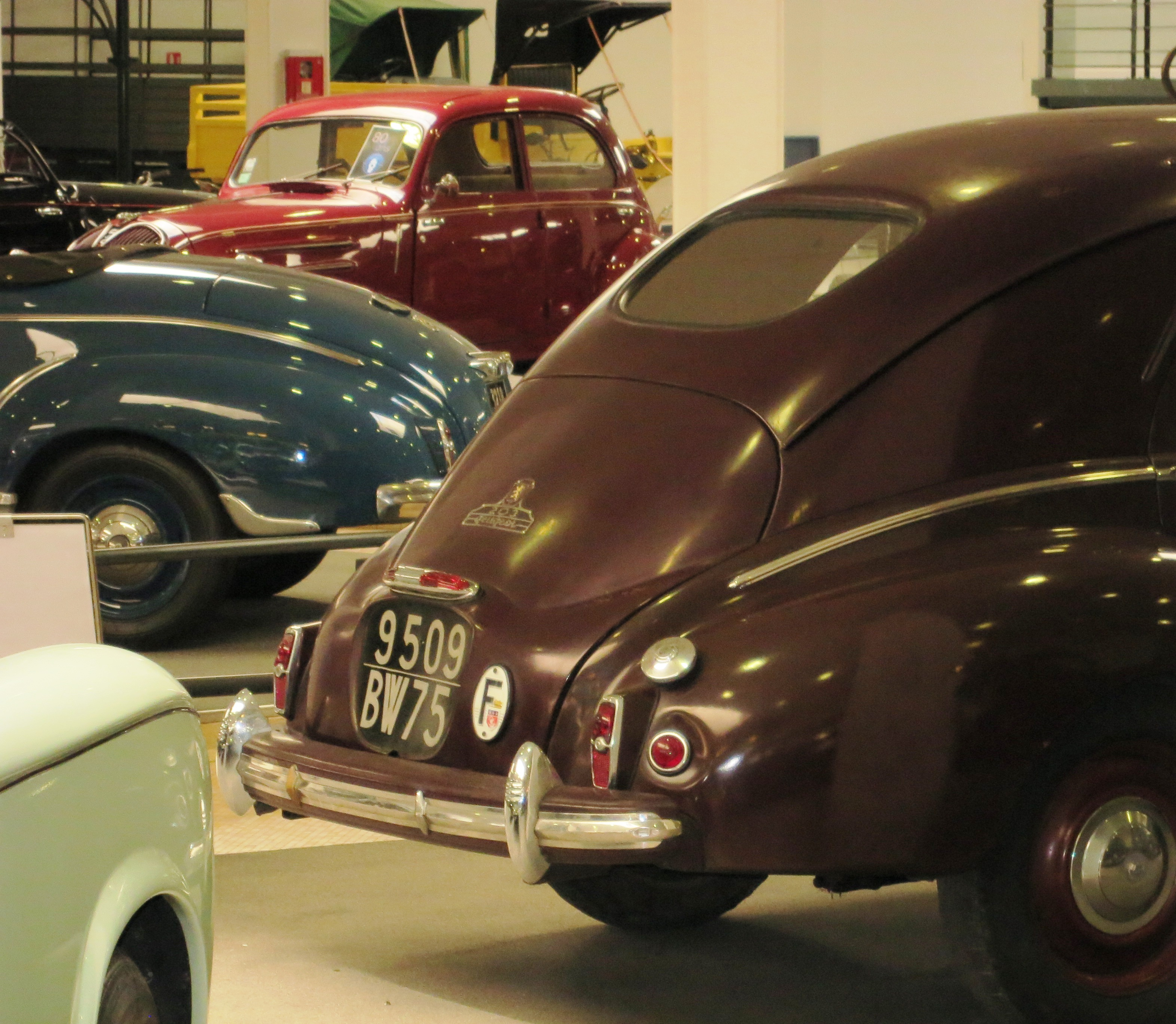
Until 1953 the protruding fuel filler cap was rather exposed. (From 1953 it was recessed and protected by a flap.)

Publicity shots from the early 1950s tend to avoid showing the rear of the car from the right side. That changes with 203s displayed at the 1953 Motor Show, after which the hitherto protruding fuel filler cap was sunk a couple of centimeters lower into the rear wing, and gained the protection of an opening flap set flush with the line of the bodywork.

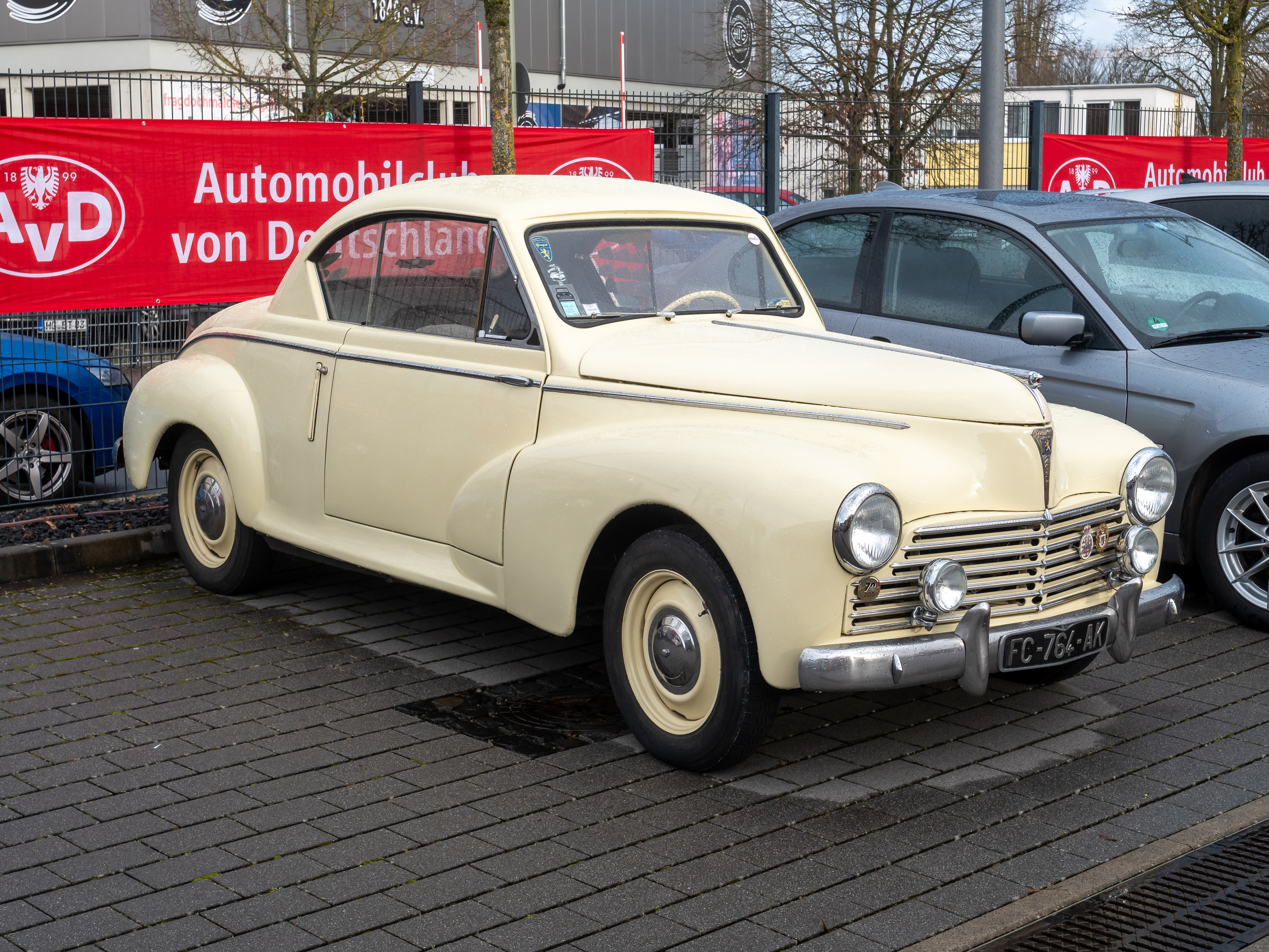
Peugeot 203 Coupé

Along with improvements to the existing cars, Peugeot introduced a 2-door 203 coupé at the end of 1952, although this was not as successful as hoped and quietly disappeared from the brochures a year later. There were several low volume cabriolet and coupé conversions produced by outside specialists in collaboration with Peugeot available during the 203's production run, though removing the roof from an early monocoque design necessitated extensive body strengthening which added to the car's weight and reduced the performance.

For a number years the leading edge of the car's nose carried an angular, forward-leaning chrome lion bonnet ornament – the lion image being Peugeot's trade mark. That was removed for 1959, due to safety concerns, and the logo was incorporated into a baguette shaped flatter emblem on the car's nose.

A military variant was developed and presented to the military who showed little interest. The prototype was converted into a factory fire engine for the Peugeot plant.

== Engine and running gear ==
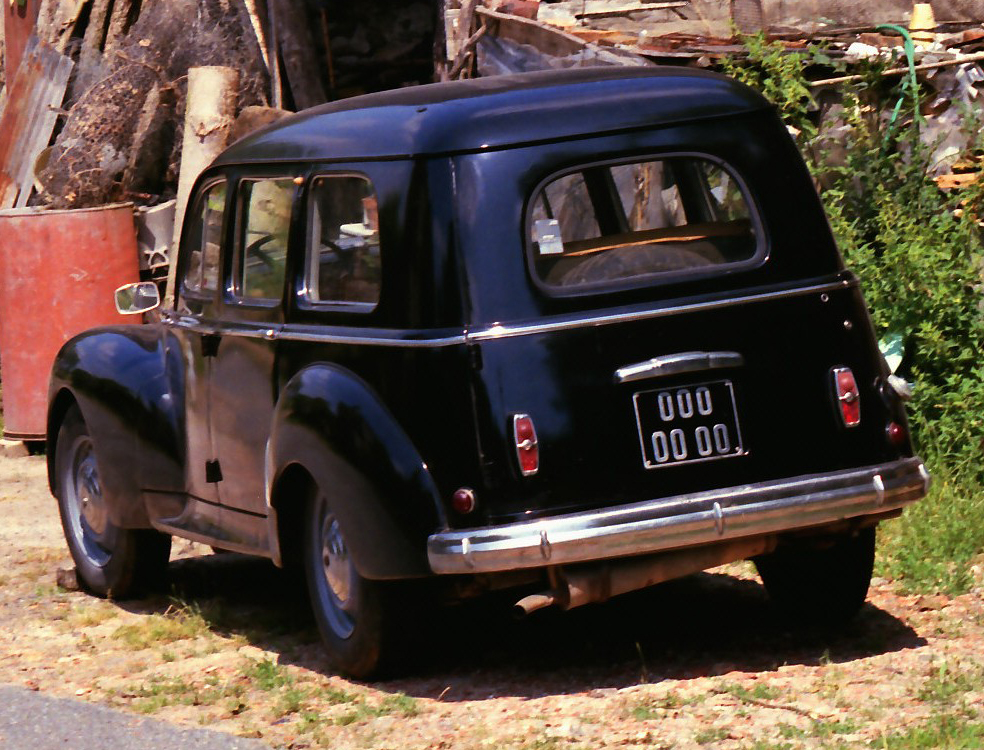
203 Familiale (family estate with 3 rows of seats)

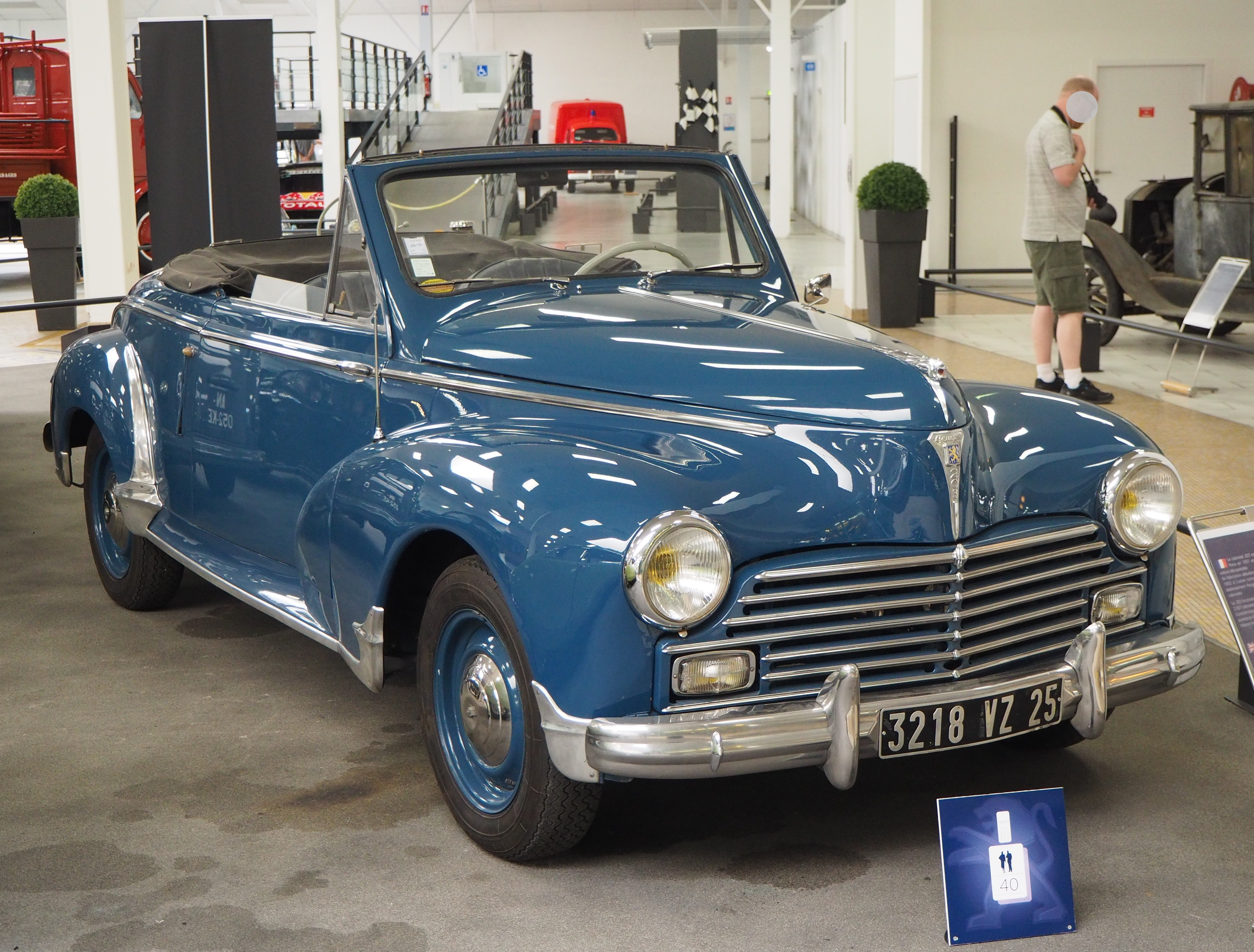
Peugeot 203 Cabriolet

The 1290 cc four-cylinder TM engine was unusual in its 'oversquare' cylinder dimensions, and was noted for the hemispherical form of the combustion chambers included in the light metal cylinder heads. At launch, a power output of 42 PS (31 kW; 41 hp) was claimed, which was increased in 1952 to 45 PS (33 kW; 44 hp) for the October 1952 Paris Motor Show. Peugeot advertising pointed out that the increase in power came without any penalty in terms of fuel economy or car tax (which was a function of the unchanged cylinder capacity). Reference was made to a change in cylinder design but there was no change in the compression ratio, which remained at 6.8:1. Advertised top speed increased accordingly, from 115 to 120 km/h (71 to 75 mph): the longer estate versions were significantly slower. 0- 97 km/h (60 mph) time was 20 seconds, and fuel consumption was 14.1–8.1 L/100 km (20–35 mpg_{‑imp}).

The column-mounted gear change controlled a four-speed manual gear box: power was delivered to the rear wheels using a propeller shaft driving through a worm-and-wheel gearset at the differential. Possibly the most significant upgrade occurred in March 1954 with a new four speed gear box featuring synchromesh on all forward speeds. Cars delivered between 1949 and 1954 came without synchromesh on the bottom ratio.

Suspension was independent up front by way of a transverse leaf spring, while the rear suspension was coil springs with Panhard rod.

== Commercial ==
The 203 was a massive hit in France. In a move which under some conditions might be expected to have encouraged discounting of the predecessor model, the 203 was already depicted and advertised vigorously on the final page of the sales brochure distributed to potential purchasers of the Peugeot 202 in October 1947, nearly a year before the 203 could be offered for sale. There seems to have been a good deal of pent-up demand by the time the 203 was actually launched, and the practicality, price and reliability of the car wooed many motorists. 200 were coming off the production line each day by 1950, and that year the 203 achieved 34,012 domestic sales, commanding 19.5% of the French auto-market, where it was second only to the (far smaller and cheaper) Renault 4CV in terms of unit sales. Home market success was followed by the export of 203s, notably to West Germany.

Six years into its production run a growing body of data on second-hand sales became available. In early 1954 it was noted that in France the 203 lost value more slowly than any other French car generally available, thanks to a combination of virtues including a reliable, economical engine, well judged equipment levels including the sun roof, good manoeuvrability helped by an unusually tight turning circle (possible because of its "old-fashioned" rear-wheel drive lay-out), and not withstanding a rather unfriendly gear box which during the summer of 1954 would be replaced by Peugeot's new all-synchromesh "C2" transmission.

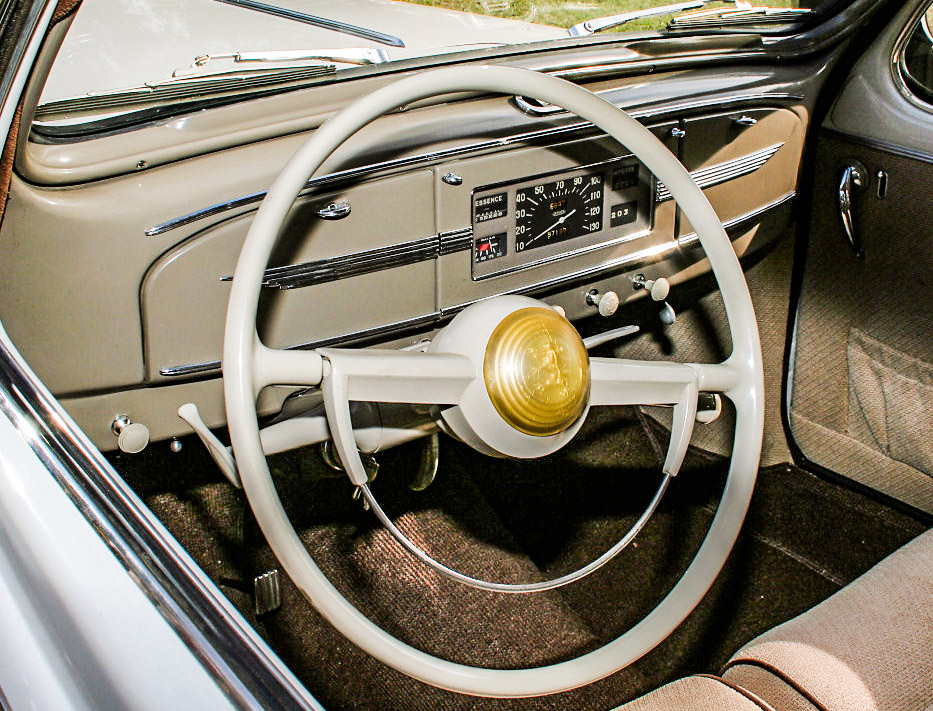
1950 Peugeot 203 interior

The strongest domestic manufacturers in the 1950s were Citroën and Renault who in the ten years after 1945 concentrated on different areas of the market from Peugeot. The success of the 203 was therefore a tribute both to the excellence of the product and to the absence from its sector, in its early years, of mainstream competitors. A powerful mainstream competitor appeared in 1951 with the launch of the Simca Aronde, but with the post-war economy finally beginning to experience useful growth there seems to have been ample capacity in the market for both cars. By 1955 when Panhard gained access to the Citroën dealership network, the 203 was well established in the market place and Peugeot themselves had moved beyond their one model policy. The 203 nevertheless continued to sell well till the end of the decade.

== The end ==
The final Peugeot 203 rolled off the production line at the Peugeot Sochaux plant on Thursday, 25 February 1960. Three months later, at the end of May, the model disappeared from the price lists.

A month after the production of the last 203, Peugeot launched the 403-sept which was a version of their larger newer 403 model with the smaller 7CV (7 fiscal horsepower) engine from the 203. At the time of the 203's demise, this stripped down version of the Peugeot 403 was presented as the replacement for the 203, though it could be argued that the spacious front-wheel-drive 1300 cc Peugeot 304, which appeared only in 1969, or indeed the consecutively named Peugeot 204 more directly occupied the market niche which in the early 1950s the 203 had made its own.

== Australian production ==
The 203 was released on the Australian market in September 1949. The 203 was also assembled in Australia, beginning in 1953, and thus becoming the first Peugeot model to enter production in that country.

== Cape Town-Paris ==
This was the route taken by Andre Mercier and Charles de Cortanze in 1953, it was 15,000 km (9,300 mi) and they performed it in a record time of 17 days. The event also sparked interest in the incredible fuel economy of the vehicle – a single tank lasted 900 km (560 mi), even with the tough terrain.

In 2003 to commemorate the 50th anniversary of the heroic journey, Didier Pijolet and Leigh Wootton both completed the feat in under a month. They were armed with their own 203s, one co-driver respectively and a film crew.

== 2006 Ampol Rerun ==
On April 23, 2006 in Sydney, about a dozen Peugeot 203 vehicles (together with other Peugeot models - 204, 403, 404) set off in the "Peugeot 2006 Round Australia Rerun". An event organised by Graham Wallis from the Peugeot Car Club of Victoria to celebrate the 50th anniversary of the 1956 Ampol Round Australia Trial which was won by Wilf Murrell and Allan Taylor in a Peugeot 403 sedan after covering 19,000 kilometres (12,000 mi) of rugged Australian roads and tracks.

In 2003, Graham Wallis organised a 50th Anniversary Rerun of the 1953 Redex Round Australia Trial in which eleven Peugeot 203s started and ten finished. The 203 win in the original Redex Trial significantly raised the profile of Peugeot in post WW2 Australia.
