= Holden 48-215 =

First motor vehicle by Holden

Holden 48-215 Holden 50-2106
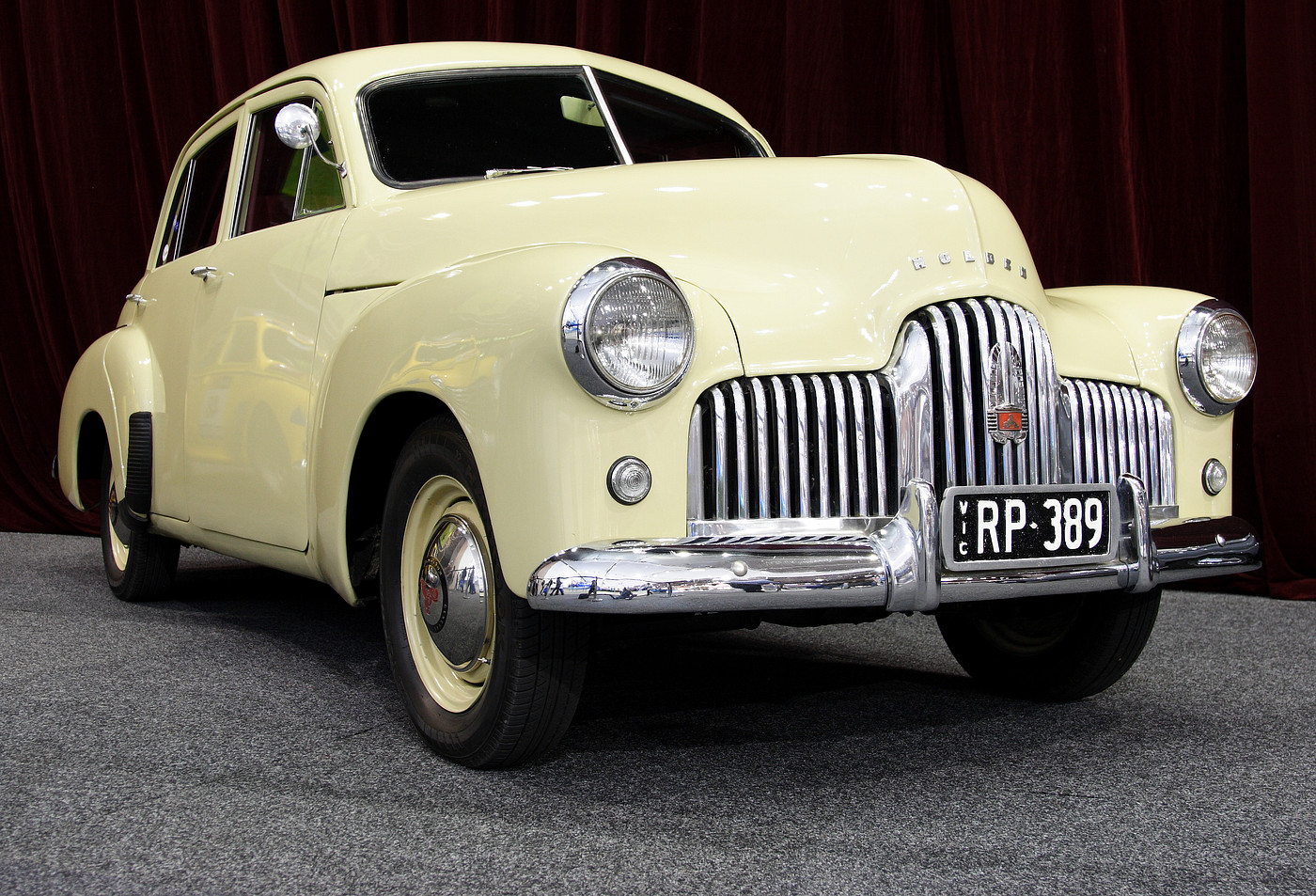

Overview
- Manufacturer: Holden
- Also called: Holden, Holden FX (unofficial)
- Production: November 1948–September 1953
- Assembly: Sydney, New South Wales (Pagewood); Brisbane, Queensland (Fortitude Valley; Adelaide, South Australia (Birkenhead); Perth, Western Australia (Holden Mosman Park Plant); Adelaide, South Australia (Woodville); Melbourne, Victoria (Fishermans Bend)
- Designer: Frank Mathwin

Body and chassis
- Class: Mid-size
- Body style: 4-door sedan (48-215); 2-door coupe utility (50-2106)
- Layout: Front-engine, rear-wheel drive

Powertrain
- Engine: 132 cu in (2,171 cc) GMH '132' I6
- Transmission: 3-speed manual

Dimensions
- Wheelbase: 103 in (2,620 mm)
- Length: 172 in (4,370 mm)
- Width: 66.9 in (1,699 mm)
- Height: 61.8 in (1,570 mm)
- Kerb weight: 2,230 lb (1,010 kg)

Chronology
- Successor: Holden FJ

The Holden 48-215 is a mid-size sedan which was produced by the Australian automaker Holden between November 1948 and October 1953. The 50-2106, a coupé utility derivative of the model marketed as the Holden Coupe Utility, was produced from January 1951.

== Overview ==
The 48-215 was the first General Motors model in Australia to bear the Holden name. With the design originated from an unused Chevrolet model. The car was marketed simply as the Holden, without a model name.

It had a 132.5 cu in (2,171 cc) cast-iron Holden Grey motor straight-six which produced 60 hp (45 kW), connected to a three-speed manual transmission. it had a 0–60 mph (0–97 km/h) acceleration time of 18.7 or 27.7 seconds (Note: Sources differ), and a 37 ft (11.3 m) turning circle.

In January 1951, the Holden 50-2106 (also known as the Holden Coupe Utility) was released, a coupé utility derivative of the 48-215 sedan. It had a payload capacity of 7 long hundredweight (780 lb; 360 kg). In July 1953, the Holden "Business Sedan" was added to the range. Originally referred to as the 48-215-257, the Business Sedan was renamed 48-217.

The 48-215 and 50-2106 models were replaced by the Holden FJ series in 1953.

== Name ==
In mainstream parlance, the official name of "Holden 48-215" was eschewed in favour of the shortened "Holden" designation. Following the replacement of the first Holden, the 48-215 gained the unofficial nickname of Holden FX. This designation was first used in the Drawing Office at GM-H in 1952 as an unofficial means of distinguishing between early 48-215 vehicles with front suspension using lever-action shock absorbers, and those with the new telescopic shock absorber front suspension introduced in 1953 - the term "FX" was pencilled onto a parts list for the new suspension components. The title "FX" later came into use in used car advertisements to describe models with the later suspension, first being used by Melbourne dealer Reg Smith Motors in two advertisements in the 10 February 1960 issue of The Age.

== Pre-production ==
=== Five prototypes ===
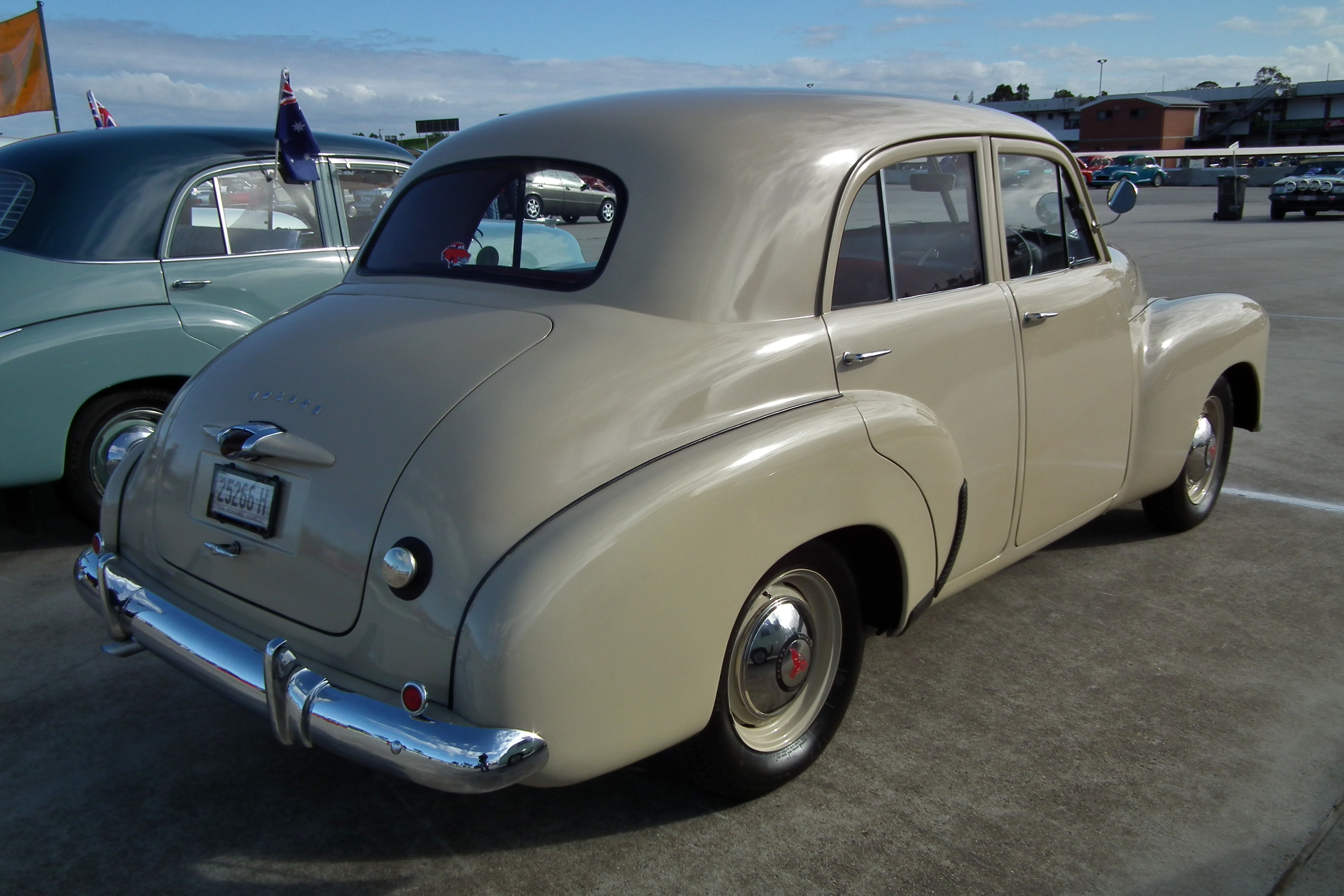
Holden 48-215 sedan

Three prototypes were built by hand in 1946 by American and Australian engineers at the General Motors workshop in Detroit. Months of durability and performance testing were undergone in the US before the three prototypes were shipped to Australia. Prototype number one was first registered (as a Chevrolet) in Victoria as JP-480 on 12 February 1947. It survives as part of the National Museum of Australia collection. Prototypes two and three were registered at the same time as JP-481 and JP-482.

A further two prototypes were built in Australia; the first was registered as KJ-400. Owned by Australian businessman Peter Briggs between 1980 and 2013, the car's value was estimated to be worth over A$1 million when it was put up for auction in the Motorclassica auction Melbourne, in October 2013. The second Australian-built prototype was registered as KY-442. All five prototypes were registered as Chevrolets.

Only two were used for photographic purposes. They were:

- Prototype No.1, JP-480, dark colour—Seine Blue (not Cadillac Blue)
- Prototype No.4, KY-442, light colour—Gawler Cream.

In the absence of an established supplier base in Australia for auto-making, new forging facilities had to be set up for producing crankshafts and a new foundry was set up for major castings. In order to hasten the project to production some simplifications were incorporated. There were no direction indicators, there was no provision for heating or demisting, and at the rear there was only a single, centrally positioned, tail lamp. Because of the mild climate in most of the populated areas of the country, it was found possible to save weight and cost by using a relatively small 6-volt 11-plate battery. Interior trim was minimised: weight reduction was pursued "with great vigour" and, in view of the 2,247 lb (1,019 kg) weight in "running trim", a success.

=== Ten pilot cars ===
- April, the production plant at Woodville, South Australia, begins tooling up to make the bodies. These would be identical to the prototypes. (Body number one, painted black, did not become pilot car number one). Also work begins on the engine assembly line at Fishermans Bend.
- 1 September, the decision is made to call the car Holden.
- 25 September, engine number 1001 is started up.
- 30 September, pilot car number one is completed in the evening. (There was no celebration, as GMH did not designate this vehicle as No. 1 Holden—it came to be known as Old Number One).
- 19 October, pilot car number one is registered as MG-501.

All four Holden colours were represented:

Pilot car No.	Colour	Serial No.	Engine No.	Registration No.
1	Gawler Cream (Body No. six)	8-1001-M	1001	MG-501
2	Black	8-1002-M	1002	MG-502
3	Black	8-1003-M	1003	MG-503
4	Black	8-1004-M	1004	MG-504
5	Black	8-1005-M	1005	MG-505
6	Seine Blue	8-1006-M	1006	MG-506
7	Convoy Grey	8-1007-M	1007	MG-507
8	Black	8-1008-M	1008	MG-508
9	Black	8-1009-M	1009	MG-509
10	Black	8-1010-M	1010	MG-510

These ten cars were used for testing. Three of them went to the Engineering Department, five went to Manufacturing, one went to the General Sales Manager, and one went to the managing director, H.E. Bettle.

== Unveiling ==
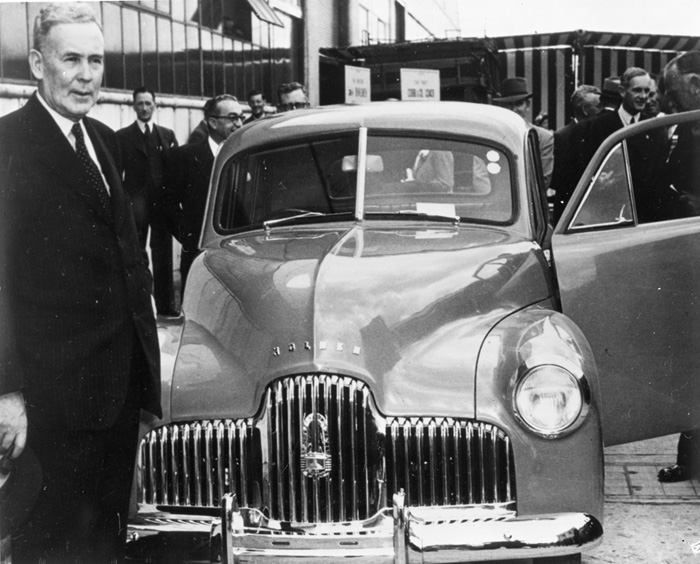
Ben Chifley at the launching of the Holden 48-215 on 29 November 1948.

When all departments were satisfied with the car, volume production began. Black bodies dominated the early roll-out but GMH made sure that each capital city also received examples of cream, blue, and grey. Ultimately, 68 Holdens were distributed to the capital cities before unveiling day.

On 21 November 1948 Holden held an open day for Fishermans Bend employees and their families, it to exhibit the entire factory and the car 48-215, GMH estimated that 12,000 guests attended. There were partly assembled cars at various stages along the assembly line as well as finished cars for the guests to inspect.

The official launch for Victorian dealers was held at the Oriental Hotel in Melbourne on Friday, 26 November.

The official unveiling by Prime Minister Ben Chifley commenced at 2:30 pm on Monday, 29 November 1948, in the Fishermans Bend Social Hall. The 400 guests applauded when silver curtains parted to reveal a cream Holden, in a black velvet setting and sparkling under spotlights, as an orchestra played Brahms' Waltz in A-flat. The celebrations at the plant were attended by 1,200 official guests. The Holden was released for sale to the public at Port Melbourne, Victoria. The car was marketed simply as the Holden, without a model name.

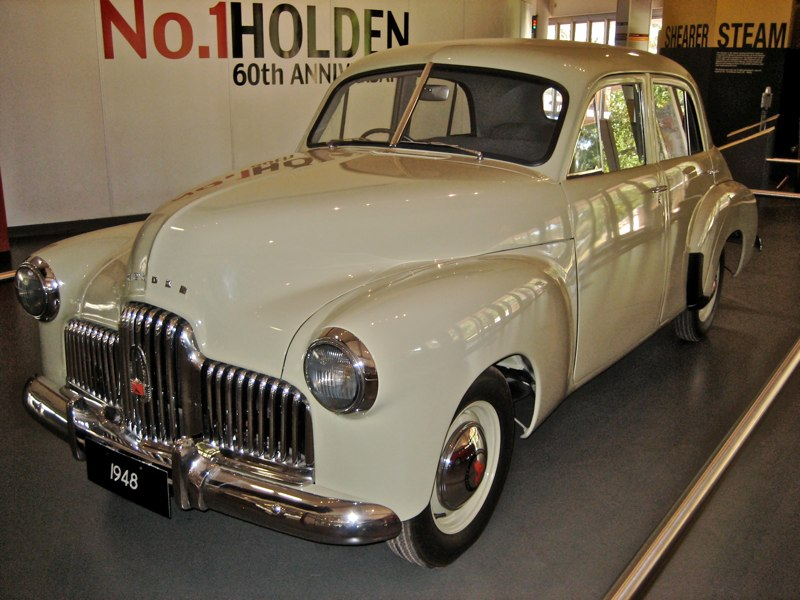
The first Holden 48-215 sedan off the production line.

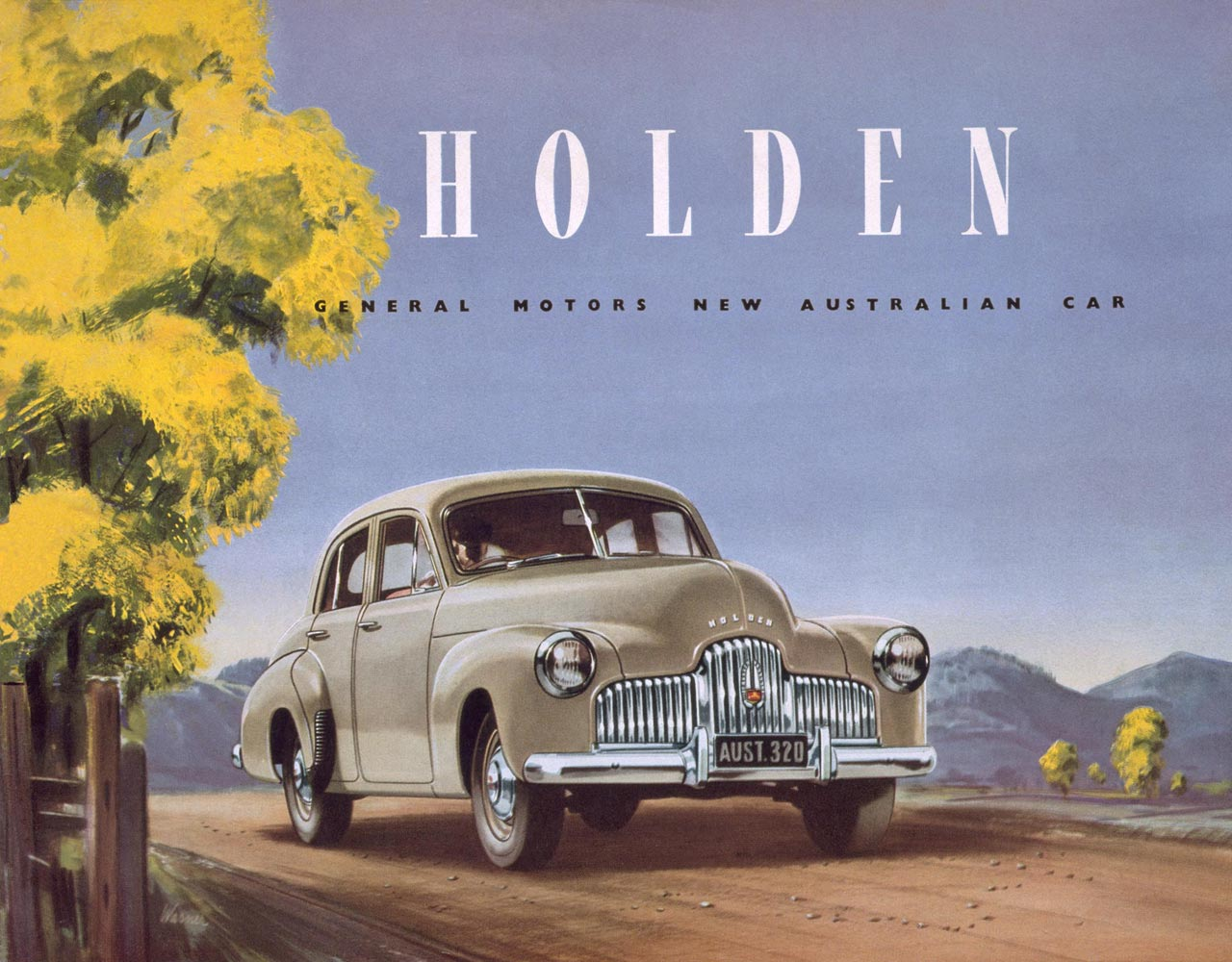
Front cover of the sales brochure for the Holden 48-215. The car was marketed simply as the "Holden".

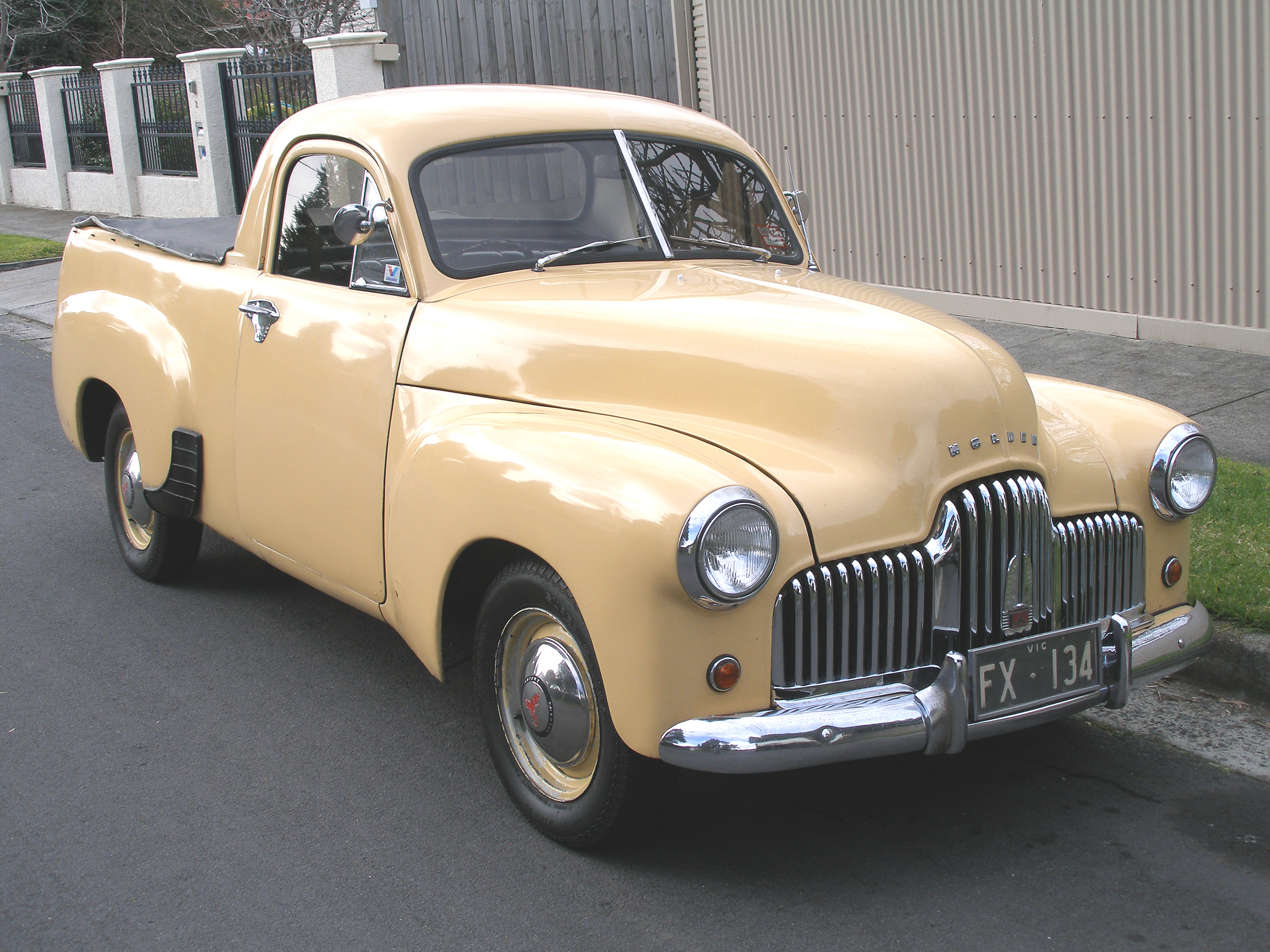
Holden 50-2106 Coupé Utility

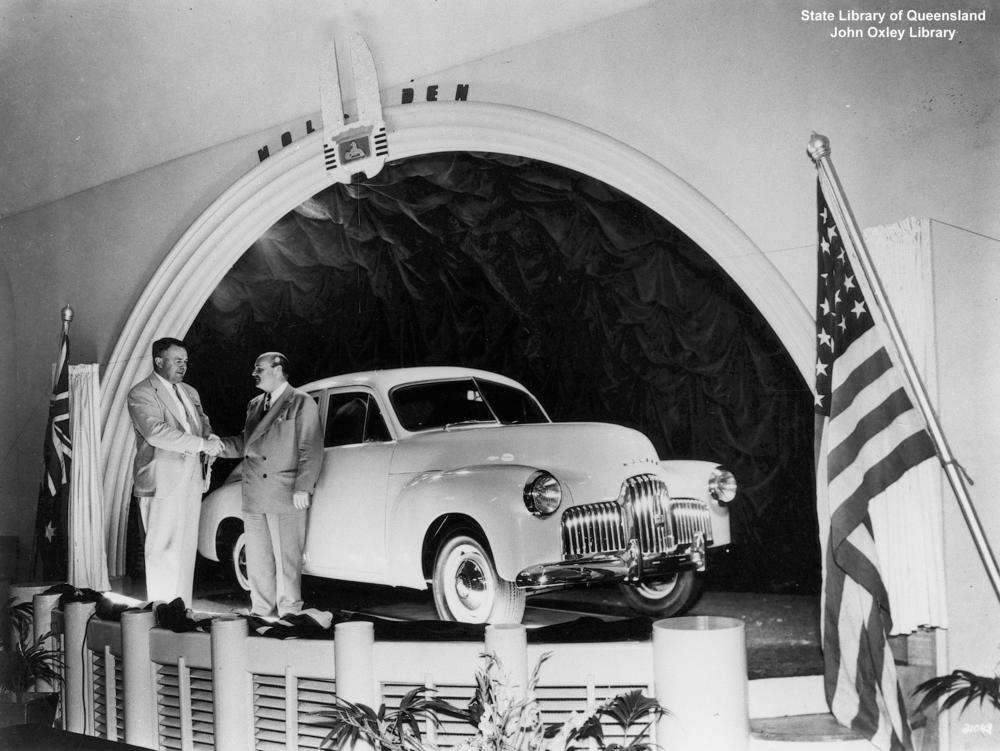
Queensland launch of the vehicle, 1948
