= 1956 Round Australia Trial (Mobilgas) =

1956 Round Australia Trial Mobilgas Trial
← Previous event	Next event →
- Host country: Australia
- Rally base: Sydney
- Dates run: 4 – 19 August 1956
- Stages: 17
- Stage surface: Tarmac and Gravel
- Overall distance: 13,680 km (8,500 miles)

Statistics
- Crews: 83 at start, 27 at finish

Overall results
- Overall winner: (Australia) Eddie Perkins (Australia) Lance Perkins

The 1956 Round Australia Trial, officially the Mobilgas Trial was the fifth running of the Round Australia Trial. The rally took place between 4 and 19 August 1956. The event covered 13,680 kilometres around Australia. It was won by Eddie Perkins and Lance Perkins, driving a Volkswagen 1200.

== Results ==
Pos	No	Entrant	Drivers	Car	Penalties (Points)
1	16	(Australia) E.B. Perkins	(Australia) Eddie Perkins (Australia) Lance Perkins	Volkswagen 1200	48
2	11	(Australia) Country Holden Dealers	(Australia) Jack Masling (Australia) Ken Miller (Australia) Harry Cape	Holden FE	62
3	14	(Australia) R.L. Foreman	(Australia) Bob Foreman (Australia) Geoff Easton	Volkswagen 1200	80
4	85	(Australia) A.A. Griffiths	(Australia) Arthur Griffiths (Australia) Maxwell Galt	Volkswagen 1200	101
5	21	(Australia) G.N. Horner	(Australia) George Horner (Australia) Bill Price (Australia) Alwyn Kurtz	Ford 1956 Customline	216
6	27	(Australia) J.R. Hall	(Australia) John Hall (Australia) James Alward	Volkswagen 1200	225
7	68	(Australia) Regal Motors	(Australia) Malcolm Brooks (Australia) Frank Tate	Standard Vanguard Phase III	241
8	38	(Australia) Mrs M.B. Blakeway	(Australia) Maude Blakeway (Australia) Norman Bolton (Australia) William Hubbard	Ford 1955 Customline	243
9	59	(Australia) J.K. Gamble	(Australia) Keith Gamble (Australia) Lorna Gamble (Australia) Geoff Ackerman	Volkswagen 1200	249
10	63	(Australia) P.J. Sullivan	(Australia) Patrick O'Sullivan (Australia) Les Innes	Volkswagen 1200	253
11	88	(Australia) A.H. Smith	(Australia) Arthur Smith (Australia) Archer Smith	Volkswagen 1200	305
12	36	(Australia) Ron Leech	(Australia) Ron Leech (Australia) Valerie Leech (Australia) Leslie Lee	Holden FJ	320
13	57	(Australia) Parkers	(Australia) Arthur Packer (Australia) Bill Parker (Australia) John Parker	Holden FE	348
14	89	(Australia) Greg Cusack	(Australia) Greg Cusack (Australia) Leigh Moore	Volkswagen 1200	385
15	47	(Australia) Doug Whiteford	(Australia) Doug Whiteford (Australia) Jim Hawker	Peugeot 403	388
16	89	(New Zealand) Alma Braddock	(New Zealand) Alma Braddock (New Zealand) Gerald McMillan	Volkswagen 1200	846
17	49	(Australia) Jack Vaughan	(Australia) Jack Vaughan (Australia) Bob Lancet	Volkswagen 1200	984
18	4	(Australia) D.M. Calvert	(Australia) Dave Calvert (Australia) Arthur Smith	Bristol 401	1,096
19	35	(Australia) N.L. Crowfoot	(Australia) Norman Crowfoot (Australia) Clarrie Newey	Simca Aronde	1,219
20	82	(Australia) D.K. Hose	(Australia) David Hose (Australia) H. Symons (Australia) James Gainger	Austin A70	1,545
21	51	(Australia) Austin Distributors Pty Ltd	(Australia) Jeff Brotherton (Australia) Patrick Case (Australia) Geoff Smith	Austin A90	1,724
22	90	(Australia) L.J. Spies	(Australia) Leo Spies (Australia) Michael Pines (Australia) Leslie Lee	Holden FJ	1,977
23	94	(Australia) Major Warwick	(Australia) Major Warwick (Australia) Allan Zimmerer	Škoda 440	2,235
24	72	(Australia) J.D. Fagan Pty Ltd	(Australia) John Fagan (Australia) Ken Limbrick (Australia) Bill Ellis	DeSoto 1955 Firedome	2,388
25	3	(Australia) Jack Hay	(Australia) Jack Hay (Australia) Jack Gore	Standard Vanguard Phase I	2,392
26	74	(Australia) Reg Lenaghan	(Australia) Reg Lenaghan (Australia) Len Lenaghan	Volkswagen 1200	2,438
27	23	(Australia) Richardson and Kurwan Pty Ltd	(Australia) Val Richardson (Australia) Max Kirwan	Humber Super Snipe Mark IV	2,717
