= 1957 Round Australia Trial (Ampol) =

1957 Round Australia Trial Ampol Trial
← Previous event	Next event →
- Host country: Australia
- Rally base: Sydney
- Dates run: 7 – 21 July 1957
- Stages: 35
- Stage surface: Tarmac and Gravel
- Overall distance: 9,660 km (6,000 miles)

Statistics
- Crews: 79 at start, 42 at finish

Overall results
- Overall winner: (Australia) Jack Witter (Australia) Doug Stewart

The 1957 Round Australia Trial, officially the Ampol Trial was the sixth running of the Round Australia Trial. The rally took place between 7 and 21 July 1957. The event covered 9,660 kilometres around Australia. It was won by Jack Witter and Doug Stewart, driving a Volkswagen 1200.

== Results ==
Pos	No	Entrant	Drivers	Car	Penalties (Points)
1	26	(Australia) J.A. Witter	(Australia) Jack Witter (Australia) Doug Stewart	Volkswagen 1200	3
2	27	(Australia) Team Perkins and Reynolds	(Australia) Eddie Perkins (Australia) George Reynolds	Volkswagen 1200	5
3	77	(Australia) Yaralin Ampol Service Station	(Australia) John Garard (Australia) Jack Garard (Australia) Greg Garard	Holden FE	21
4	70	(Australia) Bob Scarlett	(Australia) Bob Scarlett (Australia) Joe Dunlop (Australia) Ron Mountford	Standard Vanguard Phase II	48
5	58	(Australia) Mrs Blanche Brown	(Australia) Blanche Brown (Australia) Vince Brown (Australia) Cathy Price	Rolls-Royce Phantom I	61
6	5	(Australia) Des West	(Australia) Des West (Australia) Kevin Thomas (Australia) Noel Eade	Holden FE	74
7	19	(Australia) Team Sheedy and Roberts	(Australia) Col Sheedy (Australia) M. Roberts	Volkswagen 1200	76
8	64	(Australia) Team Dean and Houstein	(Australia) John Dean (Australia) Bill Houstein	Volkswagen 1200	107
9	78	(Australia) Woodger Brothers	(Australia) Rex Woodger (Australia) D. Woodger	Standard Vanguard Phase II	133
10	60	(Australia) Team Tosh and Gilbert	(Australia) Sid Tosh (Australia) Allan Gilbert	Simca Aronde	157
11	49	(Australia) W.J. Robinson	(Australia) Bill Robinson (Australia) Kevan Houley	Volkswagen 1200	159
12	69	(Australia) W.A. Burns	(Australia) William Burns (Australia) Ron Coulston	Holden FE	187
13	17	(Australia) Doreen and Bill Parker	(Australia) Doreen Parker (Australia) Bill Parker (Australia) Eric Vigar	Ford 1953 Customline	266
14	30	(Australia) R.E. Gudgeon	(Australia) Bob Gudgeon (Australia) Lionel Jenkins	Peugeot 403	297
15	82	(Australia) Pascoe Brothers	(Australia) Phil Pascoe (Australia) Norm Pascoe	Holden FE	322
16	10	(Australia) Garard's Taxi Trucks and Hire Cars	(Australia) Don Garard (Australia) Jim Roberts (Australia) Ross Garard	Holden FJ	408
17	61	(Australia) A.A. Anderson	(Australia) 'Duck' Anderson (Australia) Tony Anthony	Peugeot 403	453
18	50	(Australia) Ted Kelly	(Australia) Ted Kelly (Australia) George Hughes (Australia) B. Hopkins	Holden FJ	476
19	79	(Australia) Mrs Kathleen Christie	(Australia) Kathleen Christie (Australia) Ray Christie (Australia) Ron Grose	Standard Vanguard Phase II	477
20	66	(Australia) Laurie Sanders	(Australia) Laurie Sanders (Australia) David Pitt (Australia) G. Shipham	Holden FE	482
21	7	(Australia) Bill Lee	(Australia) Bill Lee (Australia) John Thurston	Peugeot 403	490
22	71	(Australia) Team Anderson and Kingham	(Australia) David Anderson (Australia) R. Kingham	Morris Minor 1000	521
23	31	(Australia) C.E. Hook	(Australia) Charles Hook (Australia) Vera Bayliss (Australia) H. Blake	Peugeot 403	537
24	29	(Australia) Robertson Brothers	(Australia) George Robertson (Australia) Mick Hughes	Volkswagen 1200	567
25	37	(Australia) Warren Williamson	(Australia) Warren Williamson (Australia) William Whiting (Australia) John Collins	Volkswagen 1200	601
26	1	(Australia) M.L. Arentz	(Australia) Martin Arentz (Australia) Ray Davie	Ford 1956 Customline	612
27	12	(Australia) Team Scott and Shelton	(Australia) Alan Scott (Australia) Aub Shelton	Holden FE	669
28	9	(Australia) G.S. Ross	(Australia) George Ross (Australia) T.D. Harry	Fiat 600	676
29	39	(Australia) A.C. Stone	(Australia) Angus Stone (Australia) Unknown	Volkswagen 1200	687
30	68	(Australia) Team Sly and Townsend	(Australia) Leon Sly (Australia) M. Townsend (Australia) J. Feloy	Ford 1955 Customline	694
31	20	(Australia) Hughes and Stewart	(Australia) Stewart Hughes (Australia) D. Scarlett	Standard Ten	719
32	53	(Australia) J.N. Davis	(Australia) Norton Davis (Australia) Ron Johnston	Volkswagen 1200	792
33	80	(Australia) Greg Featherstone	(Australia) Greg Featherstone (Australia) Graham Blowes	Peugeot 403	818
34	6	(Australia) John Lefoe	(Australia) John Lefoe (Australia) Jim Allen	Standard Vanguard Phase III	846
35	51	(Australia) Parade Motors Limited	(Australia) Cecil Dix (Australia) Ronald Dix (Australia) Dennis Dix	Dodge 1948	982
36	8	(Australia) Ken Christie	(Australia) Ken Christie (Australia) Edna Christie	Morris Minor 1000	1,016
37	11	(Australia) J.B. Davey	(Australia) John Davey (Australia) Unknown	Holden FJ	1,075
38	45	(Australia) Vic Wilson	(Australia) Vic Wilson (Australia) John McDonnell (Australia) Ian Gibson	Plymouth 1955	1,081
39	33	(Australia) Delore Motors	(Australia) Joe Freedman (Australia) Hayden Cadwallader	Morris Minor 1000	1,202
40	72	(Australia) Jack Davey	(Australia) Jack Davey (Australia) Eric Nelson (Australia) Bill Murison	Chrysler Royal V8 AP1	1,276
41	54	(Australia) L.A. Cave	(Australia) Len Cave (Australia) Bernie Prentice	Morris Minor 1000	1,340
42	76	(Australia) L.N. Young	(Australia) Leslie Young (Australia) Unknown	Holden FE	1,444
