= 1956 Round Australia Trial (Ampol) =

1956 Round Australia Trial Ampol Trial
← Previous event	Next event →
- Host country: Australia
- Rally base: Sydney
- Dates run: 15 – 29 July 1956
- Stages: 16
- Stage surface: Tarmac and Gravel
- Overall distance: 10,460 km (6,500 miles)

Statistics
- Crews: 113 at start, 32 at finish

Overall results
- Overall winner: (Australia) Wilfred Murrell (Australia) Allan Taylor

The 1956 Round Australia Trial, officially the Ampol Trial was the fourth running of the Round Australia Trial. The rally took place between 15 and 29 July 1956. The event covered 10,460 kilometres around Australia. It was won by Wilfred Murrell and Allan Taylor, driving a Peugeot 403.

== Results ==
Pos	No	Entrant	Drivers	Car	Penalties (Points)
1	32	(Australia) Team Murrell and Taylor	(Australia) Wilfred Murrell (Australia) Allan Taylor	Peugeot 403	258
2	17	(Australia) M.C. Goldsmith	(Australia) Max Goldsmith (Australia) Bob James	Volkswagen 1200	395
3	66	(Australia) Jack 'Milko' Murray	(Australia) Jack 'Milko' Murray (Australia) Jack Diamond (Australia) Tom Smith	Holden FJ	688
4	109	(Australia) Team Letchford and Glasson	(Australia) Jack Letchford (Australia) Arthur Glasson	Volkswagen 1200	735
5	80	(Australia) John Lefoe	(Australia) John Lefoe (Australia) Rex Woodger (Australia) Spencer Vale	Standard Vanguard Phase I	735
6	44	(Australia) Bob Scarlett	(Australia) Bob Scarlett (Australia) Ken Maxfield (Australia) Ron Mountford	Standard Vanguard Phase II	736
7	10	(Australia) A.A. Anderson	(Australia) 'Duck' Anderson (Australia) Tony Anthony	Holden FJ	758
8	35	(Australia) D.H. Antill	(Australia) Peter Antill (Australia) Max Winkless	Austin A90	773
9	34	(Australia) W.J. Robinson	(Australia) Bill Robinson (Australia) Lindsay Hall	Volkswagen 1200	874
10	85	(Australia) D.G. MacRae	(Australia) Donald MacRae (Australia) David Clinton (Australia) Mervyn Collens	Ford 1939 V8	879
11	113	(Australia) Ray and Ken Christie	(Australia) Ray Christie (Australia) Ken Christie	Standard Vanguard Phase II	983
12	25	(Australia) Roger Crocker	(Australia) Roger Crocker (Australia) Norm Howes	Peugeot 403	996
13	113	(Australia) Mrs Blanche Brown	(Australia) Blanche Brown (Australia) Vince Brown (Australia) Cathy Price	Rolls-Royce Phantom I	1,188
14	67	(Australia) L.A. Free	(Australia) Les Free (Australia) Thomas Rown (Australia) N.Nichols	Ford 1954 Customline	1,244
15	49	(Australia) Frank Bode Motors	(Australia) Les Burrows (Australia) Allan Burrows	Morris Minor	1,253
16	83	(Australia) Shepherd, Harris and Pomeroy	(Australia) Percy Pomroy (Australia) Harry Harris	Holden FJ	1,266
17	48	(Australia) Bombardier Motors	(Australia) Ronald Green (Australia) Les Westren	Peugeot 403	1,274
18	51	(Australia) J.E. Murray	(Australia) Jack 'Gelignite' Murray (Australia) Ray Murray	Ford 1948 V8	1,317
19	19	(Australia) L.N. Young	(Australia) Leslie Young (Australia) Frank Pye	Holden FJ	1,390
20	27	(Australia) Edwards Car Sales	(Australia) King Watson (Australia) Herb Wright	Holden FJ	1,399
21	92	(Australia) Garard's Radio Cabs	(Australia) John Garard (Australia) John Garard Sr. (Australia) Ross Garard	Holden FJ	1,572
22	57	(Australia) 1817 Car Club	(Australia) John Hollingshead (Australia) David Hunt (Australia) Tony Marsden	Holden FJ	1,619
23	102	(Australia) R.O. Crombie	(Australia) Bob Crombie (Australia) Maurie Craddock	Ford Anglia	1,698
24	90	(Australia) H.R. Everett	(Australia) H. Everett (Australia) David Doherty	Volkswagen 1200	1,736
25	82	(Australia) T.C. Robertson	(Australia) Thomas Robertson (Australia) Peter Denton	Morris Oxford	1,796
26	47	(Australia) Jim Dick	(Australia) Jim Dick (Australia) Roy Terry (Australia) Noel Cooper	Terraplane 1935	1,856
27	60	(Australia) A.J. Gibbons	(Australia) Alan Gibbons (Australia) Ron Speet	Volkswagen 1200	2,044
28	115	(Australia) Vic Wilson	(Australia) Vic Wilson (Australia) John McDonnell (Australia) Ian Gibson	Plymouth 1955	2,168
29	37	(Australia) K.F. Thallon	(Australia) Keith Thallon (Australia) Alan Thornton	Standard Ten	2,192
30	112	(Australia) S.C. Tosh	(Australia) Sid Tosh (Australia) Allan Gilbert	Volkswagen 1200	2,231
31	16	(Australia) T.L. White	(Australia) Tom White (Australia) Dave Gaskett (Australia) Murray Colless	Morris Isis	2,272
32	73	(Australia) Norm Porter	(Australia) Norm Porter (Australia) Lenard Caspar	Morris Minor 1000	2,307

== Gallery ==
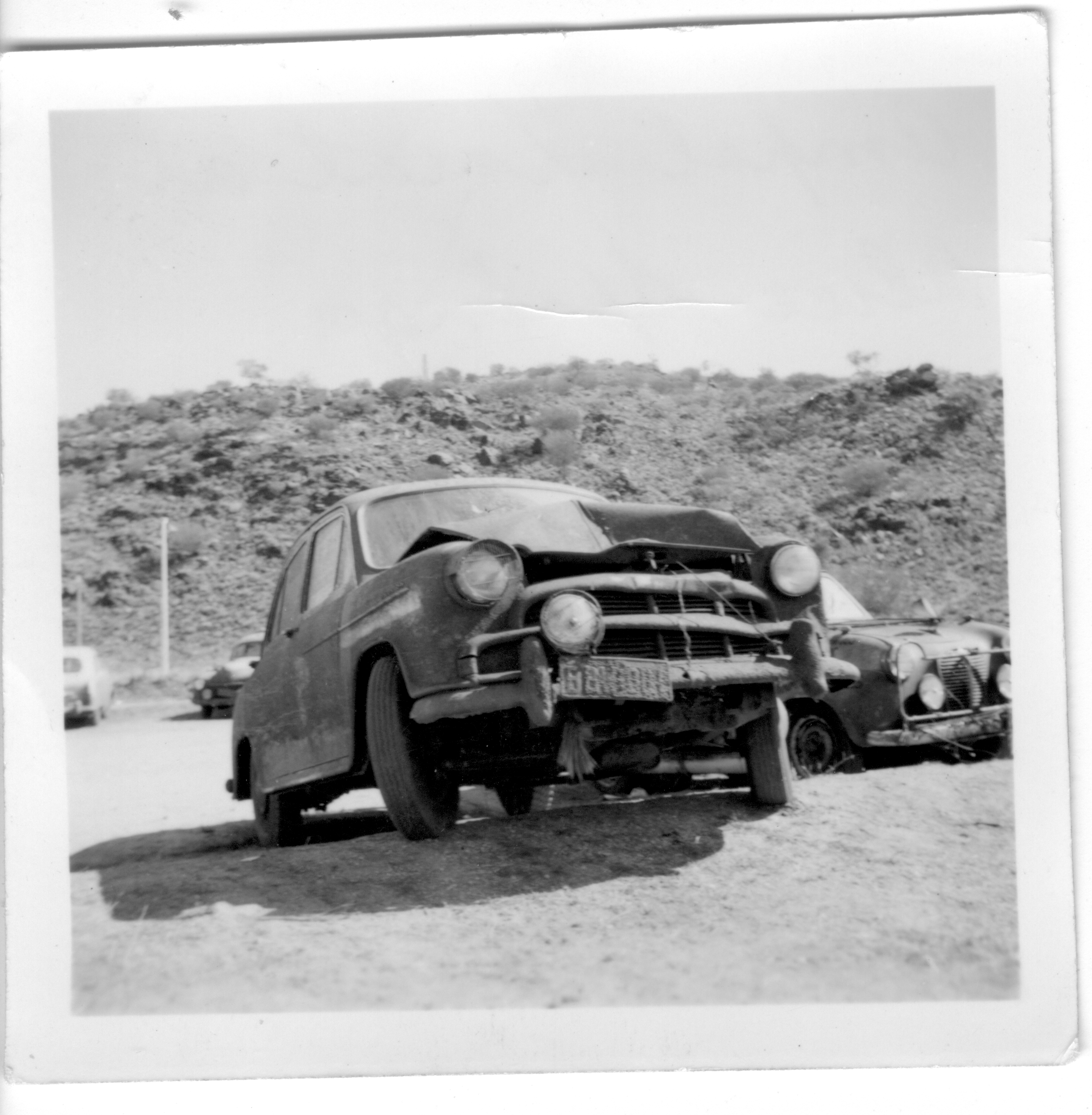
The trial in Alice Springs, July 1956

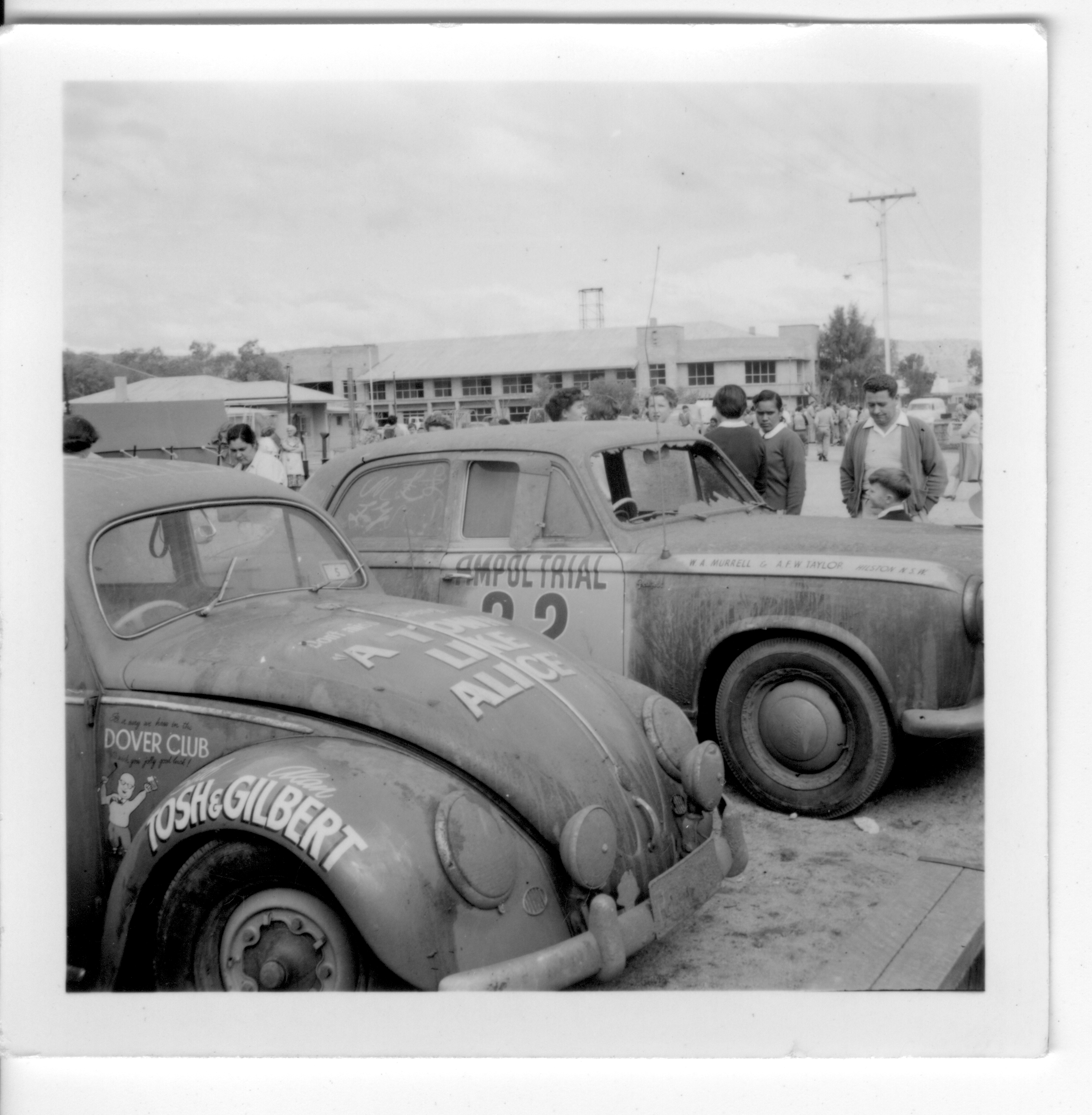
The trial in Alice Springs with the Riverside Hotel (now Todd Tavern) in the background, July 1956

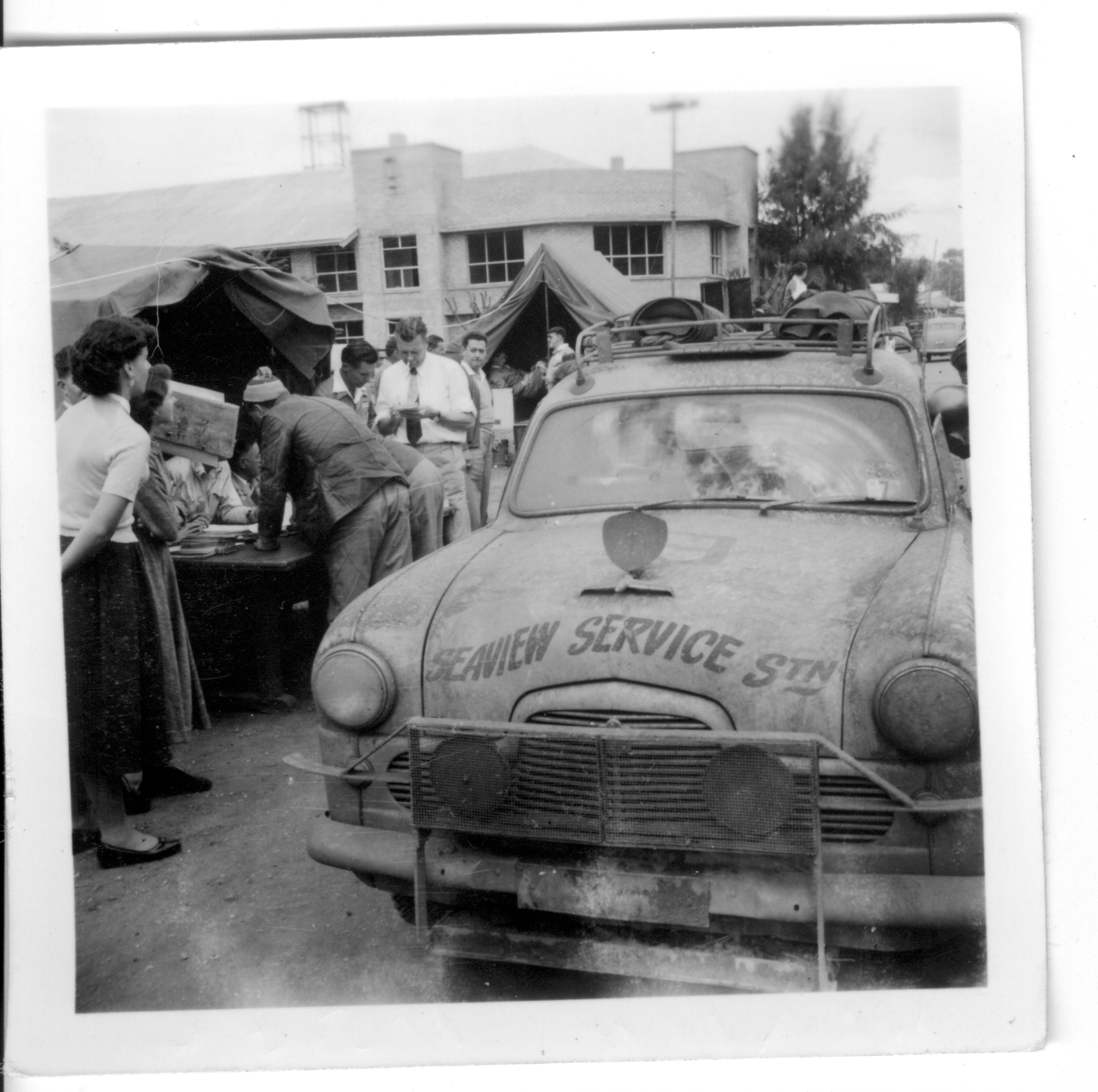
The trial in Alice Springs with the Riverside Hotel (now Todd Tavern) in the background, July 1956

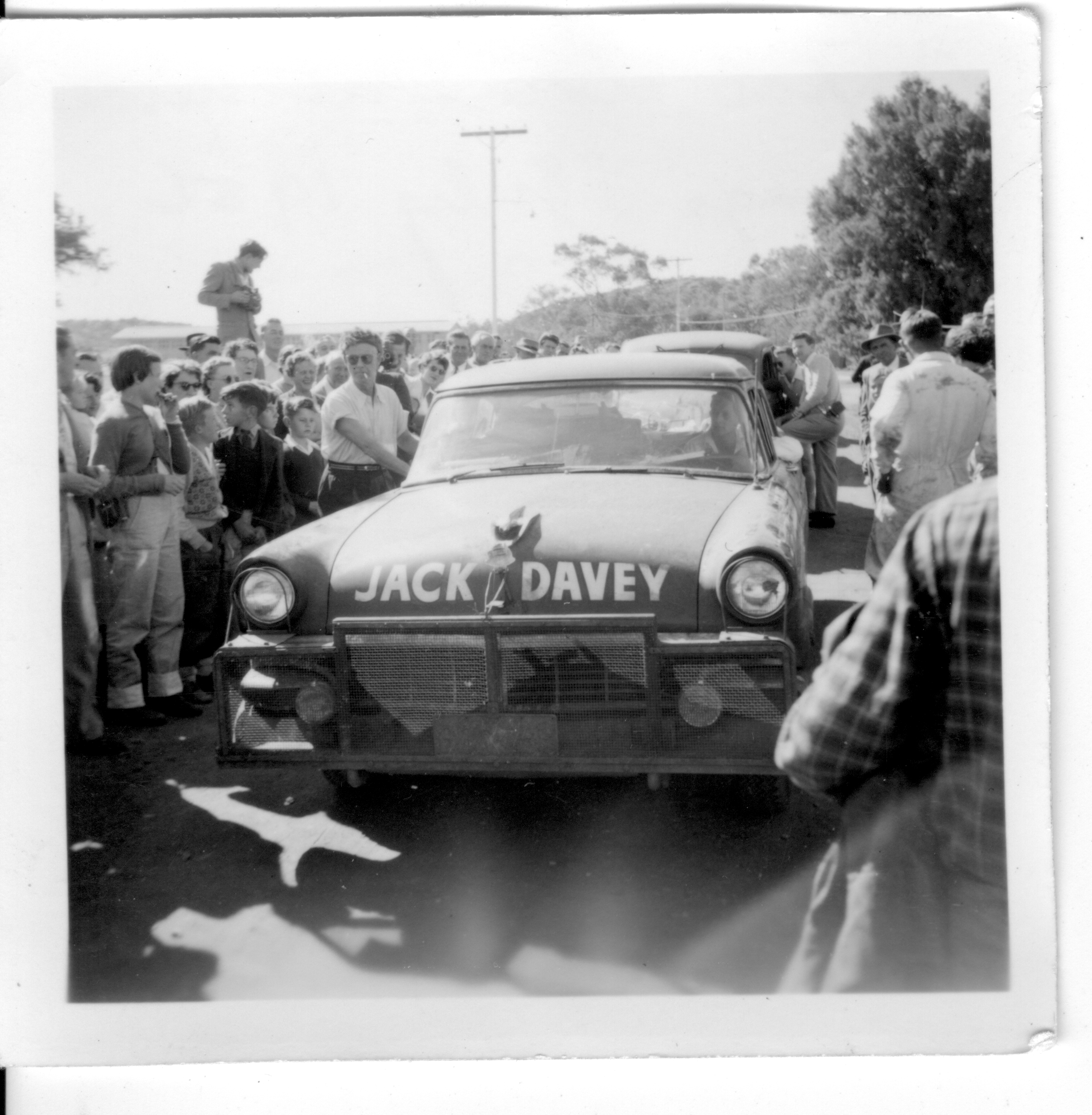
Jack Davey car in Alice Springs, July 1956

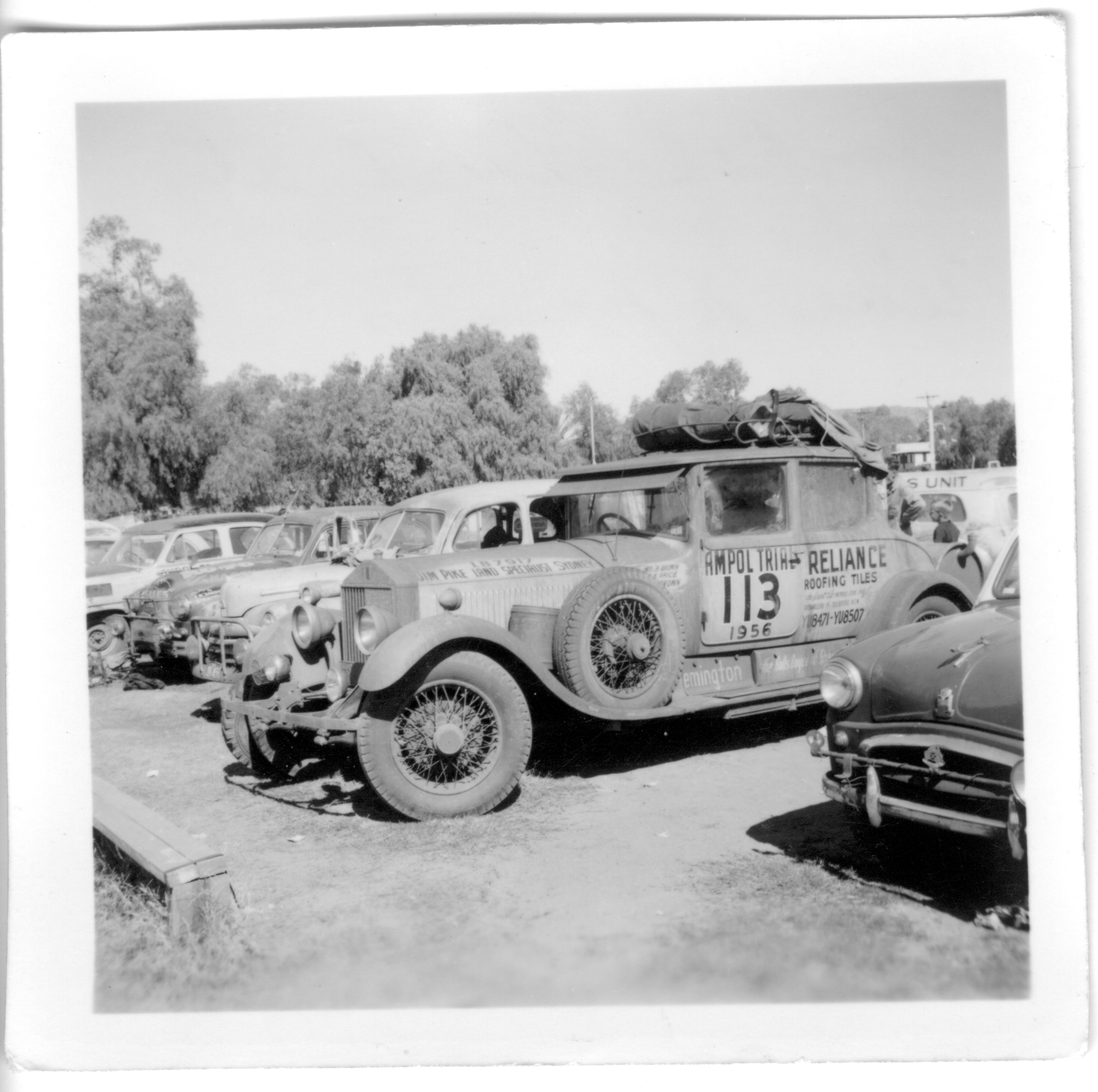
Cars at the trial in Alice Springs, July 1956

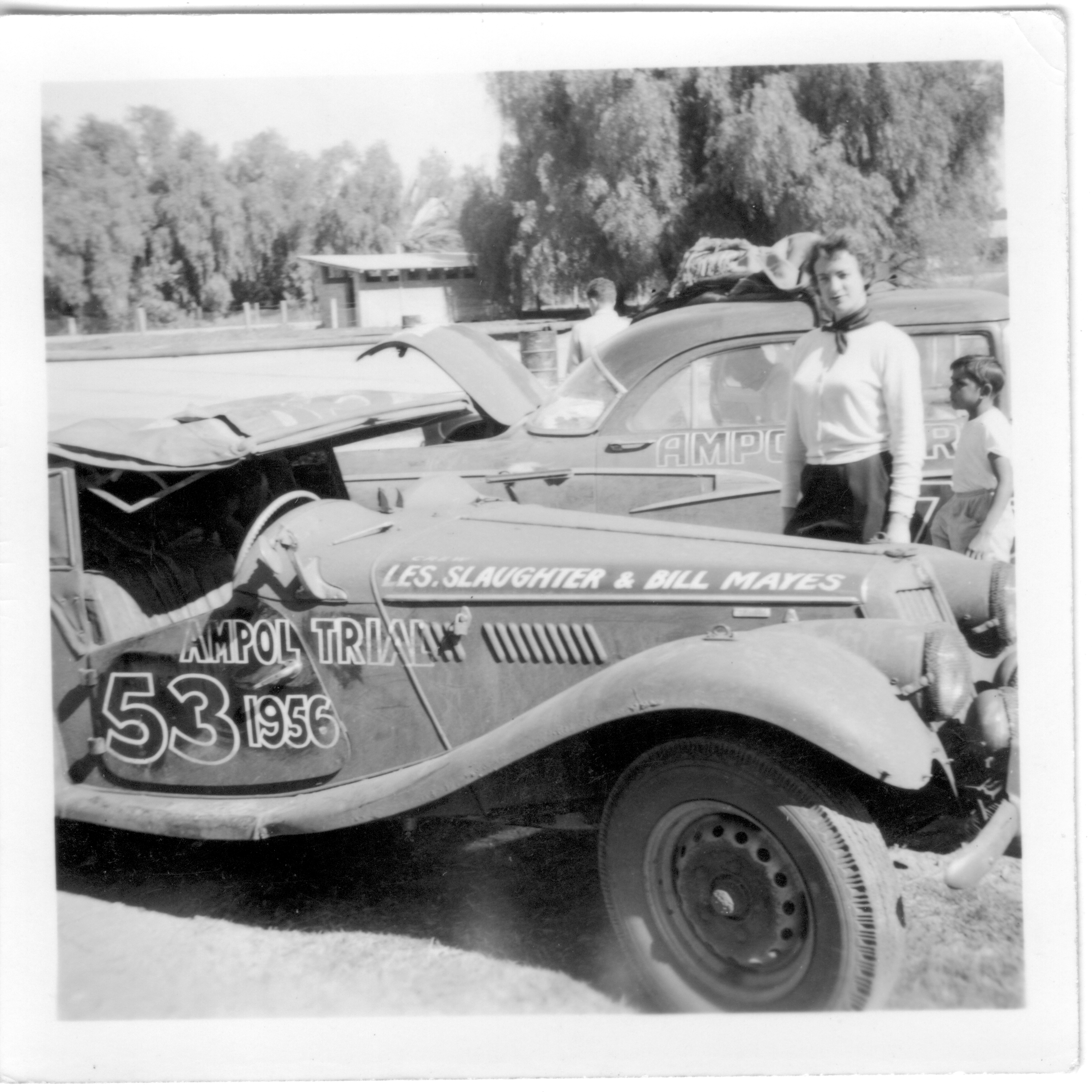
Les Slaughter and Bill Mayes car at the trial in July 1956
