= 1955 Ford =

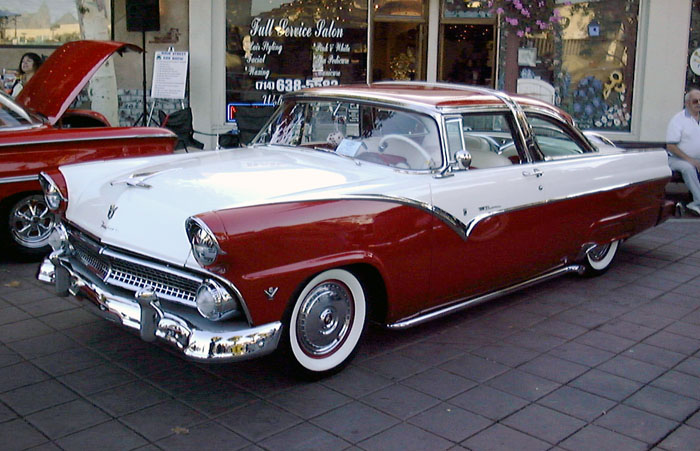
- 1955 Ford Fairlane Crown Victoria

Overview
- Manufacturer: Ford
- Production: 1954–1956
- Model years: 1955–1956
- Assembly: Main plant; Dearborn, MI (⇗); Branch Assembly; Twin Cities, MN (⇗); Somerville, MA (⇗); Richmond, CA (⇗); Norfolk, VA (⇗); Memphis, TN (⇗); Louisville, KY (⇗); Long Beach, CA (⇗); Kansas City, MO (⇗); Edgewater, NJ (⇗); Mahwah, NJ (⇗); Dallas, TX (⇗); Chicago, IL (⇗); Chester, PA (⇗); Buffalo, NY (⇗); Atlanta, GA (⇗); Worldwide; Broadmeadows, VIC, Australia (⇗) (Oceania only)

Body and chassis
- Class: Full-size Ford
- Body style: 2-door sedan (Tudor, Club Sedan); 2-door business sedan (Tudor); 4-door sedan (Fordor, Town Sedan); 2-door hardtop (Victoria); 2-door hardtop with chrome pillar (Crown Victoria); 2-door hardtop with chrome pillar & glass roof (Crown Victoria Skyliner); 4-door hardtop (Fordor Victoria); 2-door convertible (Sunliner); 2-door station wagon (Ranch Wagon, Parklane); 4-door station wagon (Country Sedan, Country Squire); 2-door sedan delivery (Courier); 2-door coupe utility (Australia)
- Layout: FR layout

Powertrain
- Engine: 223 CID (3.7 L) OHV I6; 272 CID (4.5 L) Y-block V8; 292 CID (4.8 L) T-bird V8; 312 CID (5.1 L) T-bird V8 (1956)
- Transmission: 3-speed manual; 3-speed manual plus overdrive; Ford-O-Matic 3-speed automatic

Dimensions
- Wheelbase: 115.5 in (2,934 mm)
- Length: 198.5 in (5,042 mm)
- Width: 75.9 in (1,928 mm)
- Curb weight: 3,080–3,262 lb (1,397–1,480 kg)

Chronology
- Predecessor: 1952 Ford
- Successor: 1957 Ford

The 1955 Ford is an automobile which was produced by Ford in the United States for the 1955 model year and, in revised form, for the 1956 model year. A new design would be offered in 1957.

== 1955 ==
The American Ford line of cars gained a new body for 1955 to keep up with surging Chevrolet and Plymouth, although it remained similar to the 1952 Ford underneath. The Mileage Maker I6 was bumped up to 223 CID (3.7 L) for 120 hp (89 kW) and the new-for-1954 Y-block V8 was now offered in two sizes: Standard Fords used a 272 CID (4.5 L) version with 162 hp (121 kW) with 2-barrel carburetor and single exhaust or 182 hp with 4-barrel carburetor and dual exhaust, but the large 292 CID (4.8 L) unit from the Thunderbird was also offered, boasting 193 hp (144 kW).

Apart from the engine changes, customers were sure to notice the new Fairlane, which replaced the Crestline as the top trim level, while a new Crown Victoria-style featured a chrome "basket handle" across the familiar (and continued) "Victoria" hardtop roof, which originally appeared on the Mercury XM-800 concept car. This use of a styling feature to visually separate the front of the passenger compartment from the rear reappeared on the 1977-1979 Ford Thunderbird, the Ford LTD Crown Victoria, the Ford Fairmont Futura and Mercury Zephyr Z-7 coupes. The company now marketed three different rooflines on its two-door models; the tall two-pillar Mainline, Customline, and Fairlane sedans, pillarless hardtop Fairlane Victoria and the chrome-pillar Fairlane Crown Victoria. The Fairlane Crown Victoria was also offered with a transparent "skylighted" top. New brakes were used 11-inch (280 mm) drums. Also, Fords had a new frame, but still with five cross members.

The Fords introduced for 1955 also featured the panoramic windshields found on Oldsmobiles, Buicks and Cadillacs the previous year. With this panoramic windshield the A-pillars had a vertical angle that gave the driver a more panoramic visibility.

For the first time, Ford offered seat belts as a dealer option (not factory installed, with instructions provided by a Service Bulletin). Also new for 1955 was Ford's first factory installed air conditioner. This “Select Aire” option featured an integrated heater core and evaporator coil unit within the dash and cold air discharge vents located on top of the dash on either side of the radio speaker. The "Select Aire" design was carried over to the 1956 models with slightly different cold air vents in the same location as on the 1955 models. The condenser was mounted in front of the radiator as in later cars.

The 1955 Fords were marketed under separate names for each of the three trim levels: Ford Mainline, Ford Customline and Ford Fairlane. Station wagons were offered as a separate series for the first time for 1955. The Ranch Wagon and Custom Ranch Wagon were 2 door wagons while the Country Sedan and Country Squire models were 4 door wagons, the latter featuring wooden appliqué side mouldings. A sedan delivery variant was marketed as the Ford Courier.

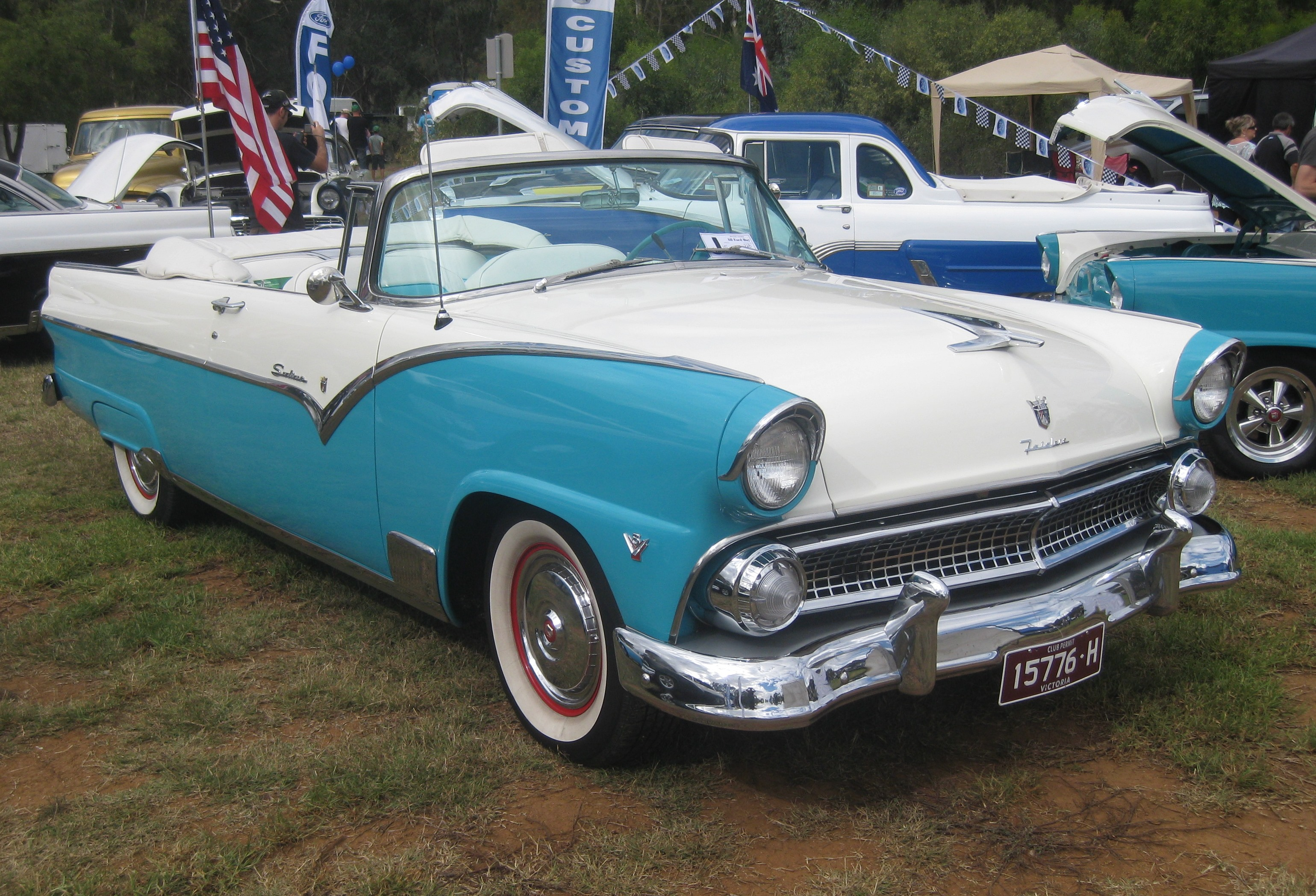
1955 Ford Fairlane Sunliner

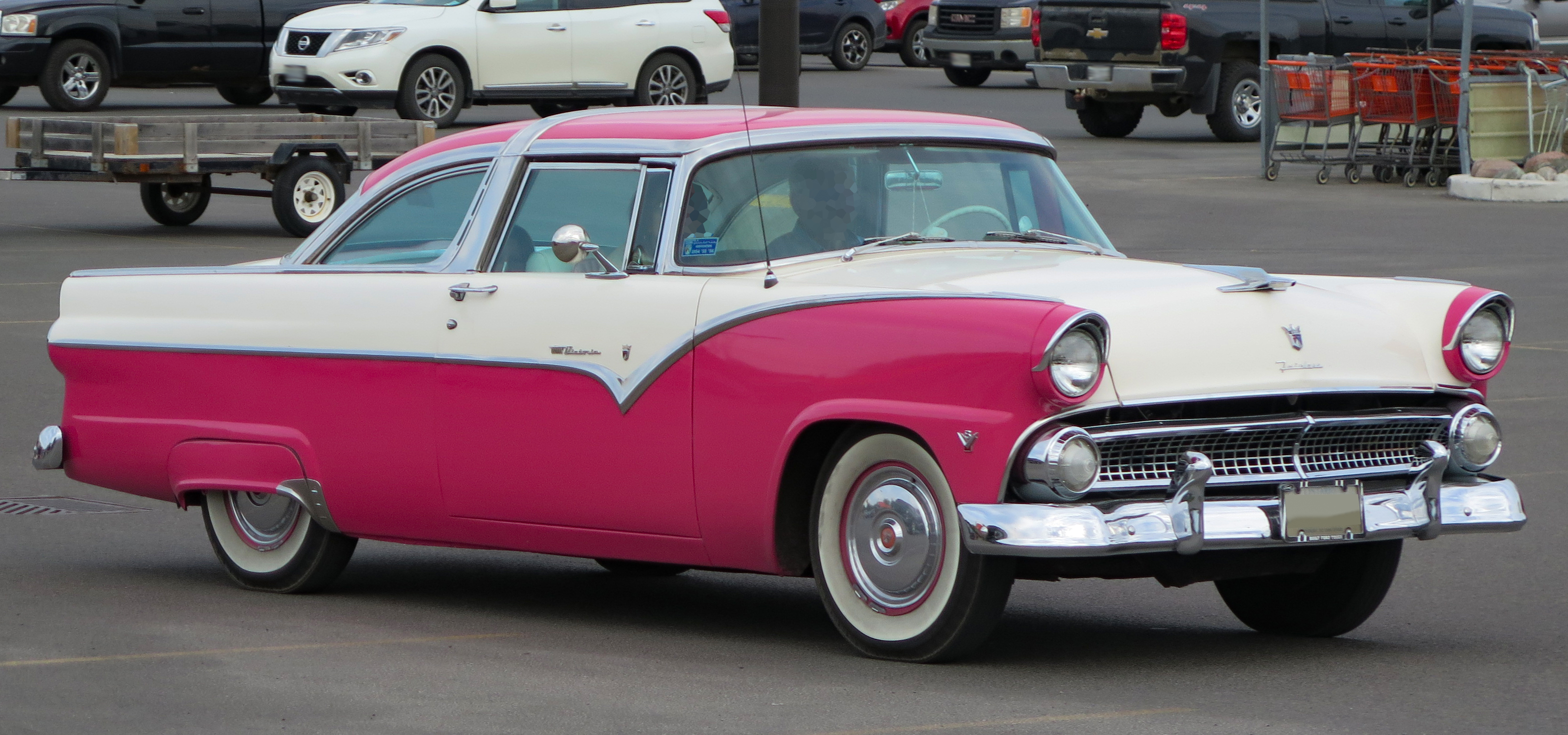
1955 Ford Fairlane Crown Victoria

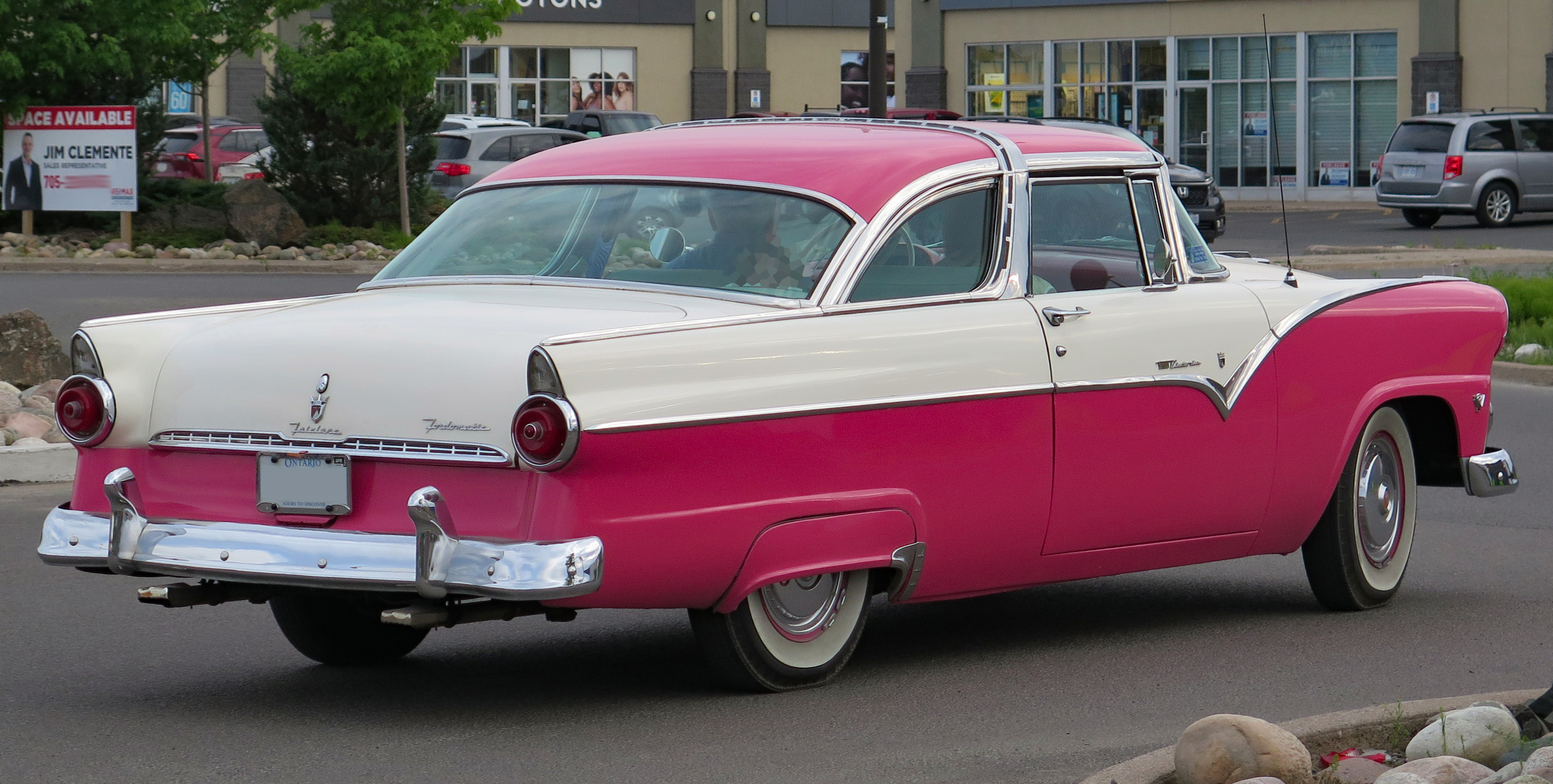
1955 Ford Fairlane Crown Victoria, rear view

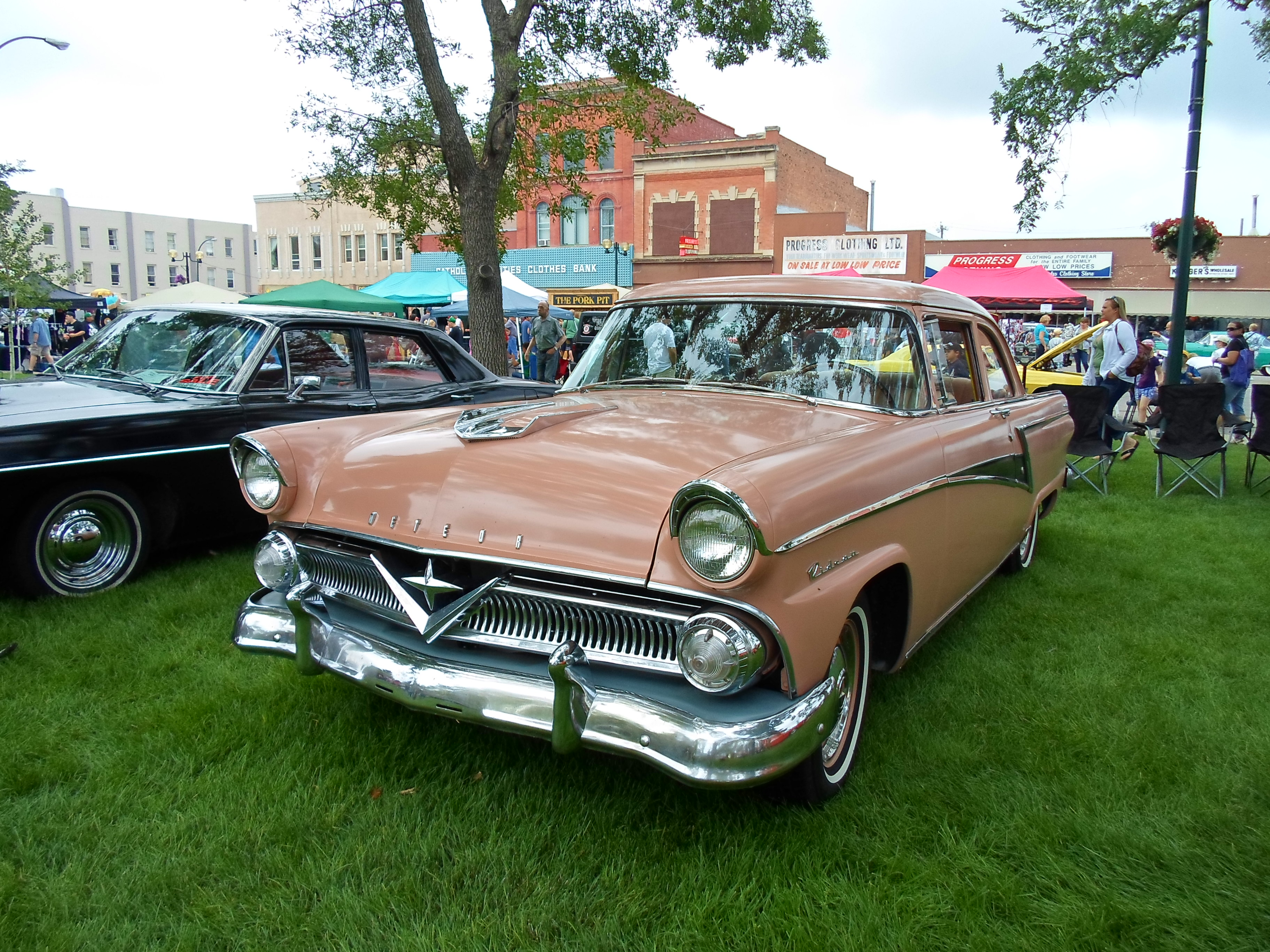
1955 Meteor (Canada)

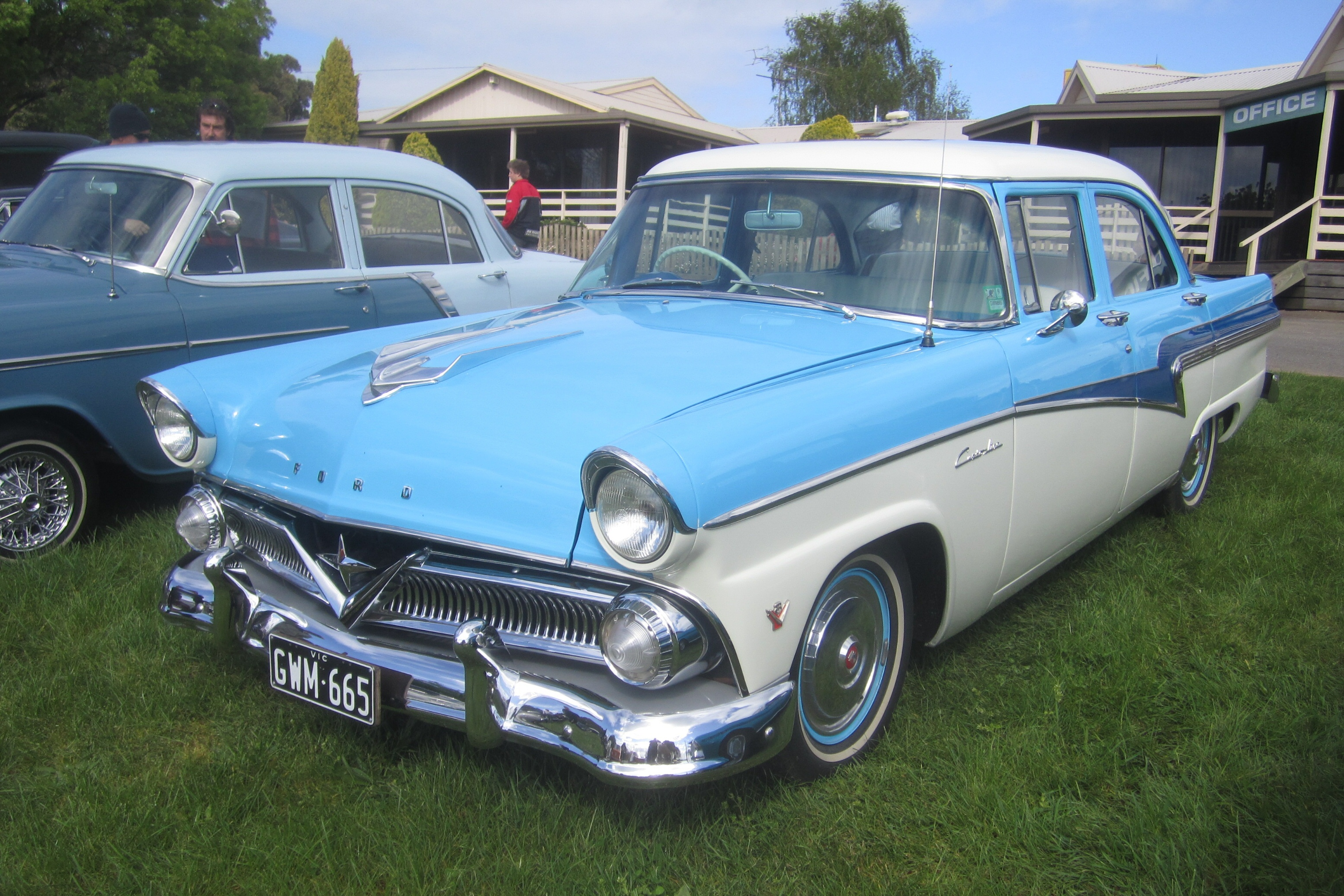
1958-60 Australian built Customline with revised grille

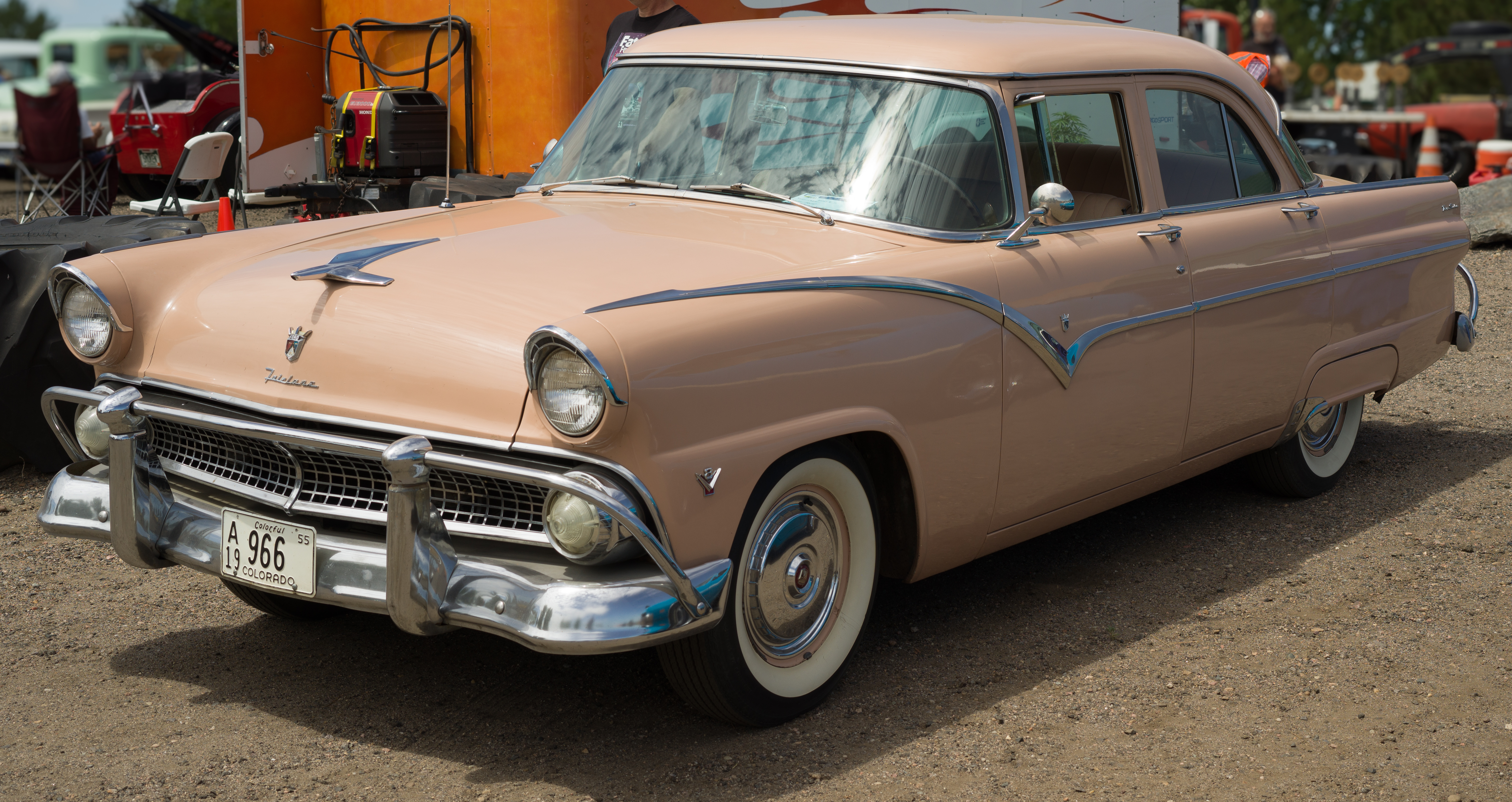
1955 Ford Fairlane 4 Door Sedan in Sandalwood Tan

=== Engines ===
engine displacement, type, carburetor type	max. power at rpm	compression ratio	Available transmissions
223 cu in (3.7 L) Mileage Maker I6 1-barrel	120 bhp (89 kW; 122 PS) @ 4,000	7.5 to 1	3-speed manual (column-shift); 3-speed manual (column-shift) plus overdrive; 3-speed automatic (column-shift) "Fordomatic"
272 cu in (4.5 L) Y-block V8 2-barrel	162 bhp (121 kW; 164 PS) @ 4,400	7.6 to 1	3-speed manual (column-shift); 3-speed manual (column-shift) plus overdrive; 3-speed automatic (column-shift) "Fordomatic"
292 cu in (4.8 L) Y-block V8 4-barrel Interceptor (Police)	188 bhp (140 kW; 191 PS) @ 4,400	7.6 to 1	3-speed manual (column-shift); 3-speed manual (column-shift) plus overdrive; 3-speed automatic (column-shift) "Fordomatic"

== 1956 ==
The eggcrate grille featured on the 1955 cars was widened into a series of rectangles for 1956, but this subtle exterior change was nothing compared to Ford's adoption of a 12-volt electrical system, with a six volt system optional. The Crown Victoria Skyliner's sales were plummeting with just 603 made, and it would be replaced by a convertible the next year. A new addition at midyear was the "Town Victoria" 4-door hardtop model which, along with the new Customline Victoria 2-door hardtop, were meant to compete with the Chevrolet Bel Air and Plymouth Belvedere. The Parklane, a Fairlane trimmed Tudor station wagon, was added to compete with the Chevrolet Nomad. There were new convenience options, such as a new air-conditioner system, a new heater, and a nine-tube signal-seeking radio. Instead of gauges, instrument cluster warning lights for oil pressure and ammeter were standard.

Victoria hardtop coupes now adopted the lower, sleeker roofline used by both 1955 and 1956 Crown Victoria, sans the wide chrome roof trim.

The Lifeguard safety package — consisting of seat belts, a padded dashboard, safety door locks, a deep-dish steering wheel, and a breakaway rearview mirror — was introduced. The option was a slow-seller. The optional air conditioner, which remained expensive and thus a slow seller, was totally revamped; the compressor was now housed beneath the hood and the cooling vents were moved to atop the dashboard (it could not be ordered on the Thunderbird).

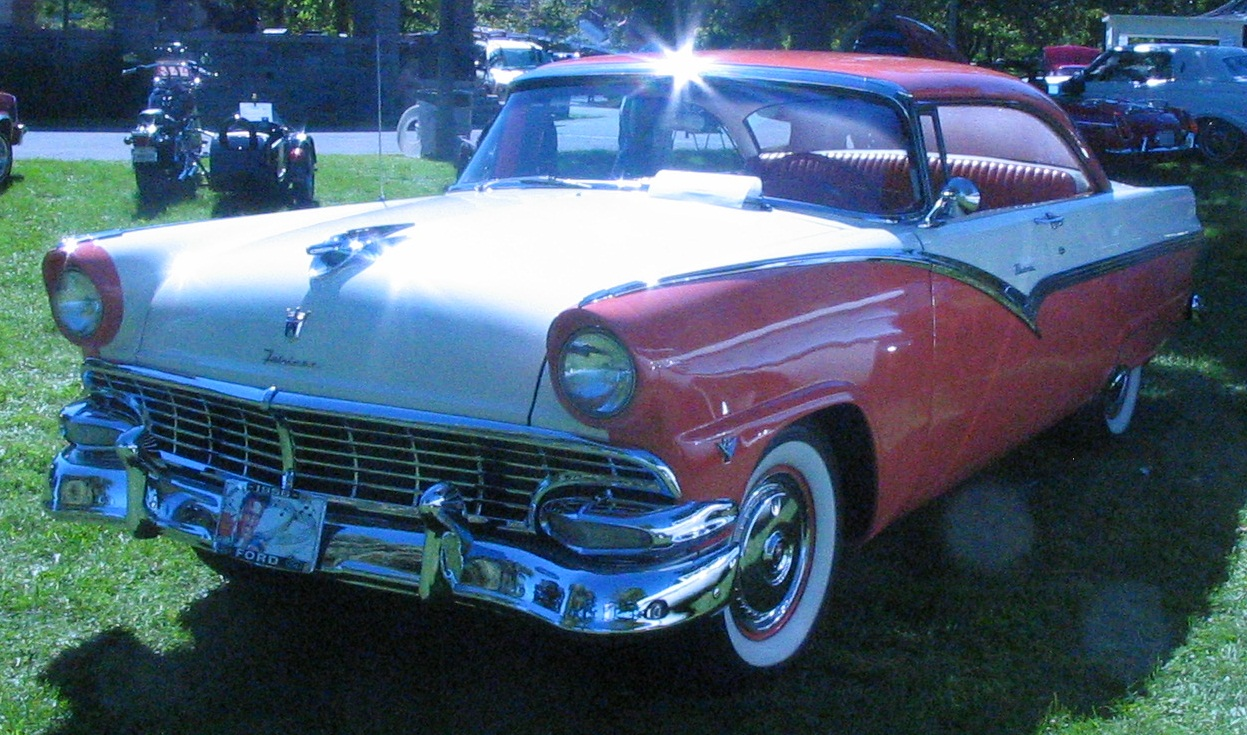
1956 Ford Fairlane Victoria two-door hardtop

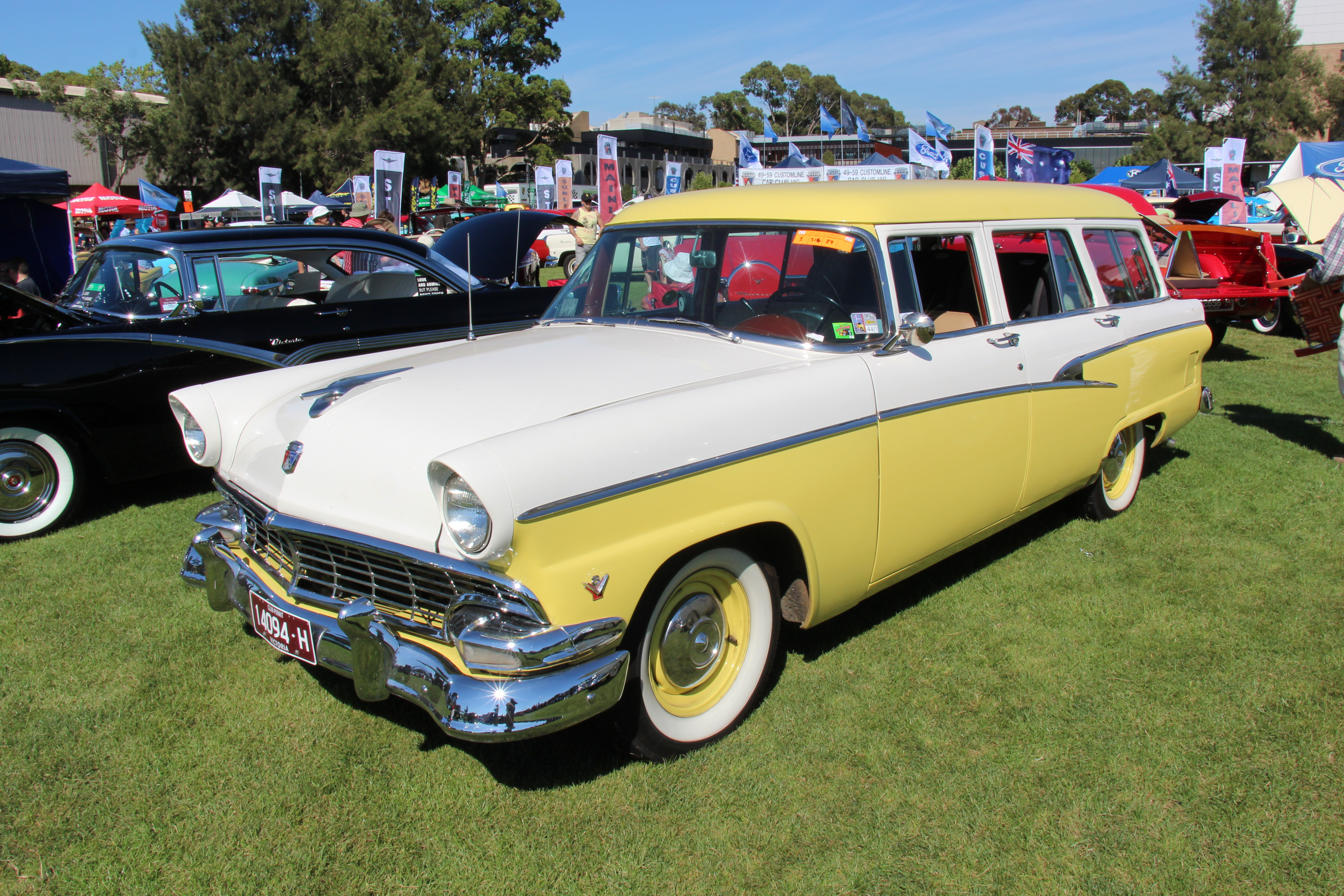
1956 Ford Six-Passenger Country Sedan

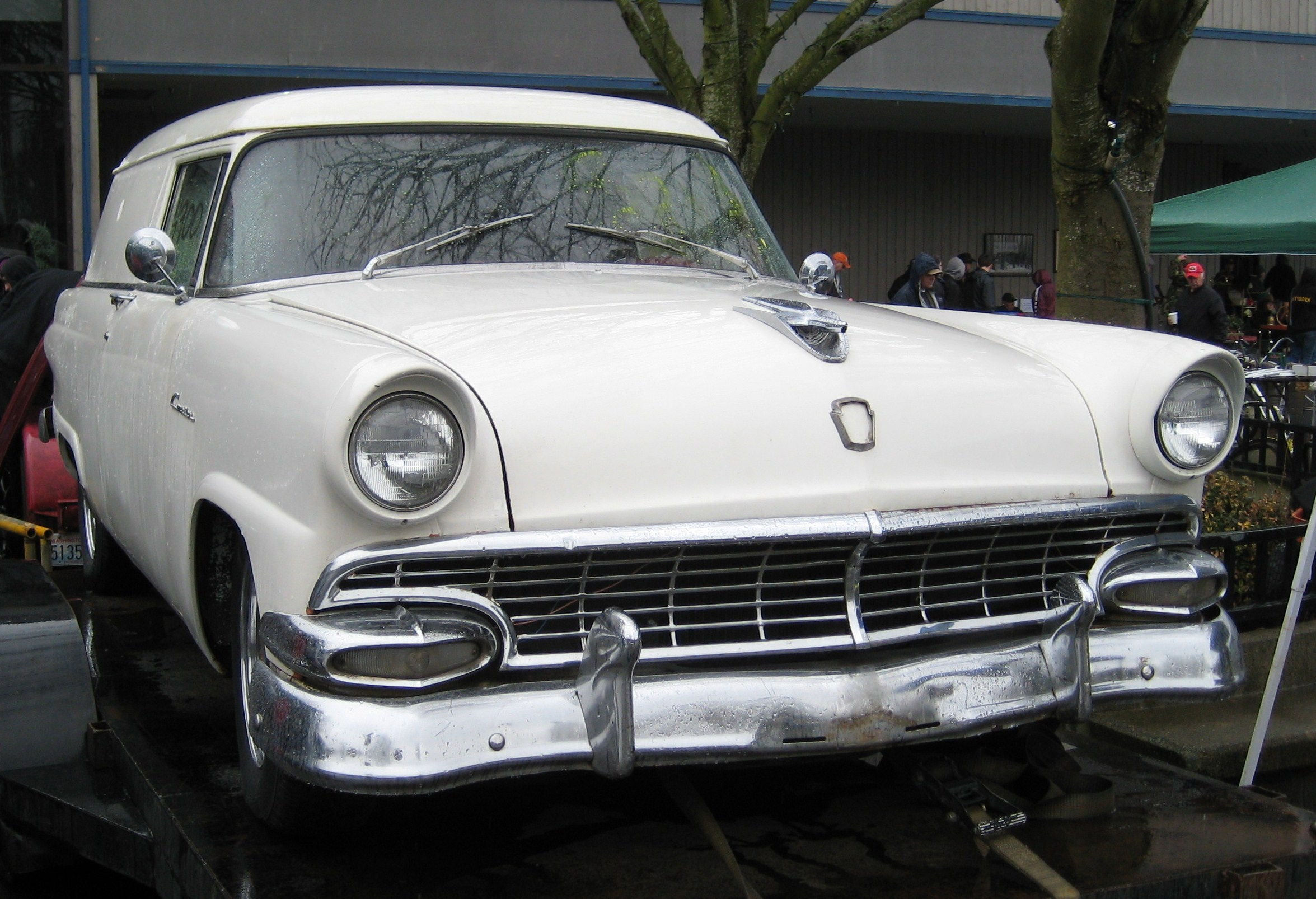
1956 Ford Courier Sedan Delivery

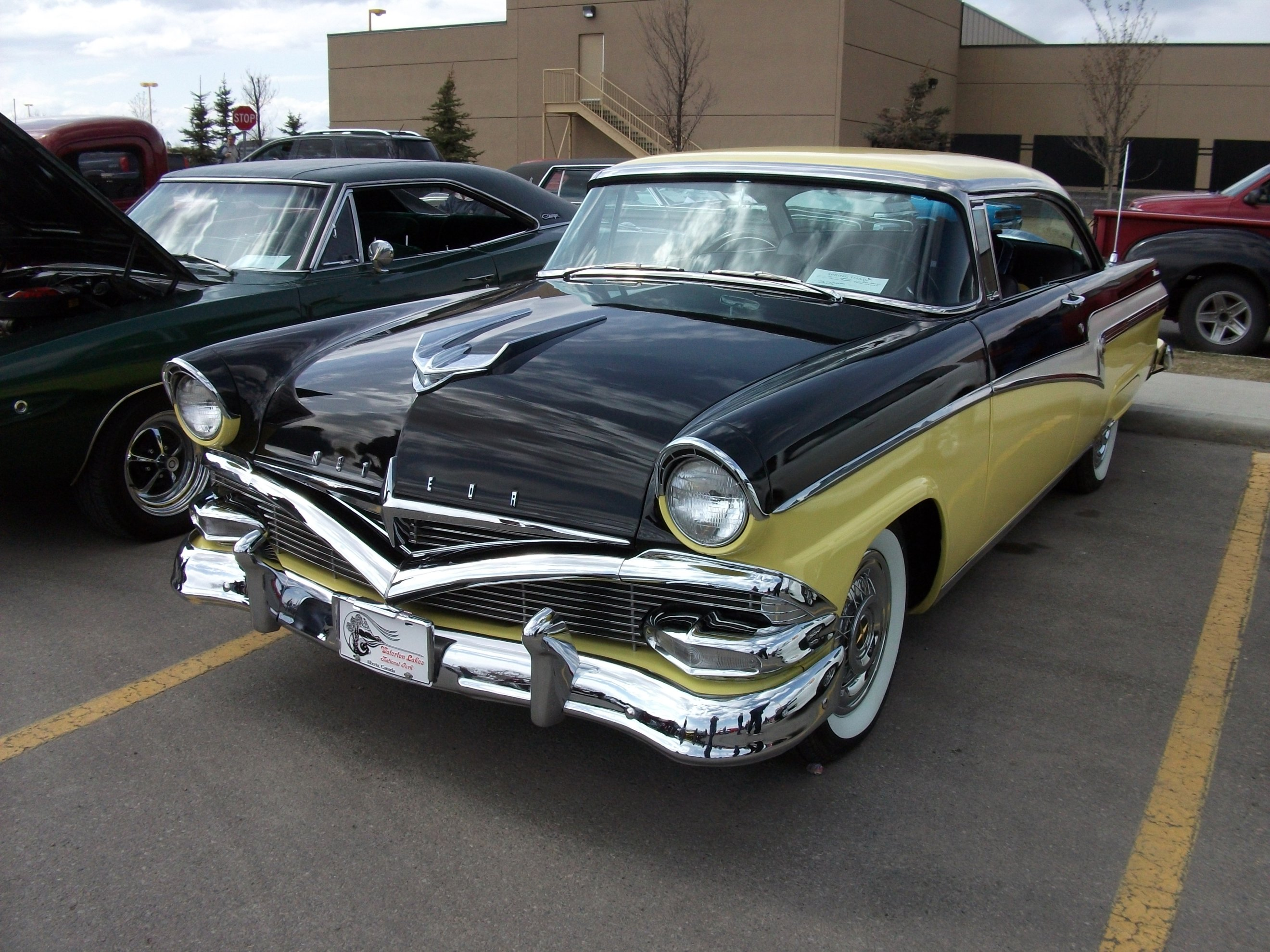
1956 Meteor (Canada)

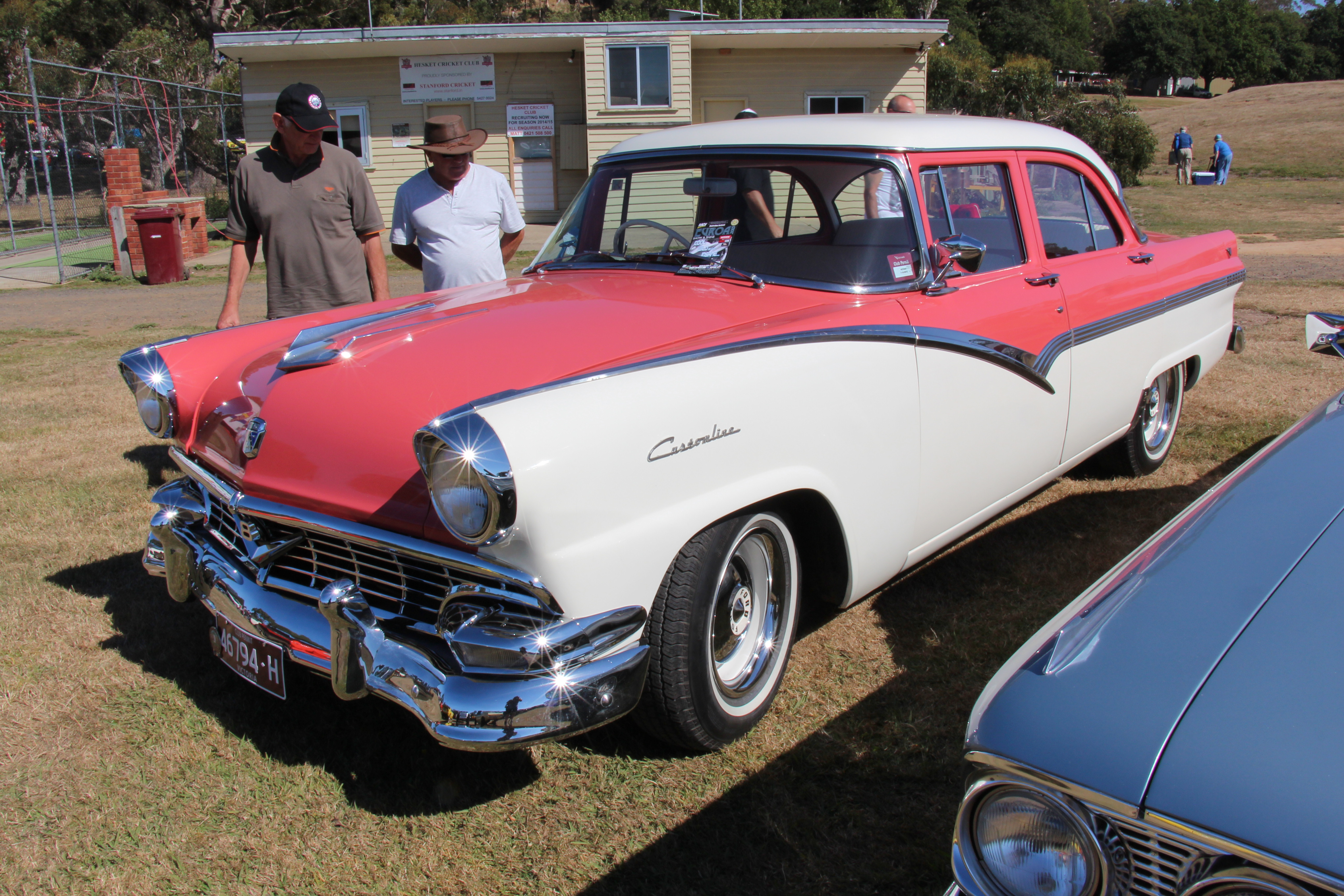
1957 Australian built Customline with revised grille

=== Engines ===
engine displacement, type, carburetor type	max. power at rpm max. torque at rpm	compression ratio	Available transmissions
223 cu in (3.7 L) Mileage Maker I6 1-barrel (all models)	137 bhp (102 kW; 139 PS) @ 4200 202 lb⋅ft (274 N⋅m) @ 1600-2600	8.0 to 1	3-speed manual (column-shift); 3-speed manual (column-shift) plus overdrive; 3-speed automatic (column-shift) "Fordomatic"
272 cu in (4.5 L) Y-block V8 2-barrel (Mainline and Customline)	173 bhp (129 kW; 175 PS) @ 4400 260 lb⋅ft (353 N⋅m) @ 2400	8.0 to 1	3-speed manual (column-shift); 3-speed manual (column-shift) plus overdrive
272 cu in (4.5 L) Y-block V8 2-barrel (Mainline and Customline)	176 bhp (131 kW; 178 PS) @ 4400 264 lb⋅ft (358 N⋅m) @ 2400	8.4 to 1	3-speed automatic (column-shift) "Fordomatic"
292 cu in (4.8 L) Thunderbird V8 4-barrel (Fairlane and Station Wagons) (Mainline and Customline, since mid-year )	200 bhp (149 kW; 203 PS) @ 4600 285 lb⋅ft (386 N⋅m) @ 2600	8.0 to 1	3-speed manual (column-shift); 3-speed manual (column-shift) plus overdrive
292 cu in (4.8 L) Thunderbird V8 4-barrel (Fairlane and Station Wagons) (Mainline and Customline, since mid-year )	202 bhp (151 kW; 205 PS) @ 4600 289 lb⋅ft (392 N⋅m) @ 2600	8.4 to 1	3-speed automatic (column-shift) "Fordomatic"
312 cu in (5.1 L) Interceptor V8 4-barrel (police only)	210 bhp (157 kW; 213 PS) @ 4600 312 lb⋅ft (423 N⋅m) @ 2600	8.0 to 1	3-speed manual (column-shift); 3-speed manual (column-shift) plus overdrive
312 cu in (5.1 L) Interceptor V8 4-barrel (police only)	215 bhp (160 kW; 218 PS) @ 4600 317 lb⋅ft (430 N⋅m) @ 2600	8.4 to 1	3-speed automatic (column-shift) "Fordomatic"
312 cu in (5.1 L) Thunderbird Special V8 4-barrel (Fairlane and Station Wagons, since mid-year )	225 bhp (168 kW; 228 PS)	9.0 to 1	3-speed automatic (column-shift) "Fordomatic"

== Australian production ==
The 1955 Ford was also produced by Ford Australia which offered it as a V8 Customline 4-door sedan and as a V8 Mainline 2-door coupe utility. The latter body style was developed in Australia utilising an imported convertible chassis strengthened for load carrying. A limited number of Customline wagons was also built.

The 1955 model was the first Australian Ford to receive the new overhead-valve "Y-block" V8 engine, and went on sale at the end of July 1955. Australian Customlines and Mainlines received the 1956 US Ford facelift and then further makeovers in 1957 and 1958 with the final series utilizing the grille from 1955 Meteor of Canada. The 1957s, introduced in September 1957, were also available with the Fordomatic automatic transmission, and local parts content had been increased to 80 percent.

By 1958 the Customline was being marketed as the Ford V8 Fordomatic when supplied with automatic transmission. 1958 was also when the larger, 292 cu in (4.79 L) V8 engine was introduced. Australian production ended the following year with the introduction of the 1959 US Ford which was locally produced in Custom 300, Fairlane 500 and Ranch Wagon models.

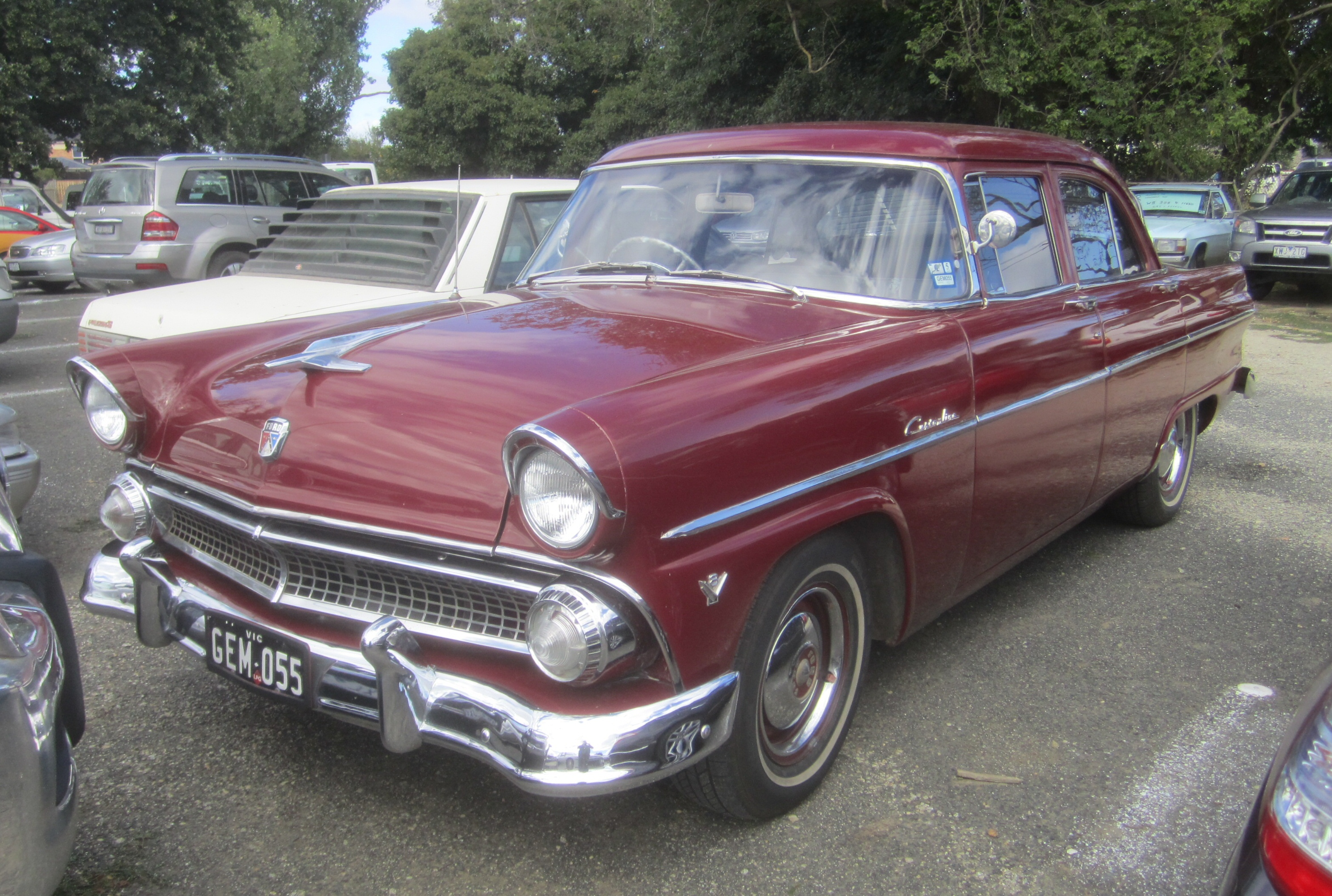
1955 Ford V8 Customline

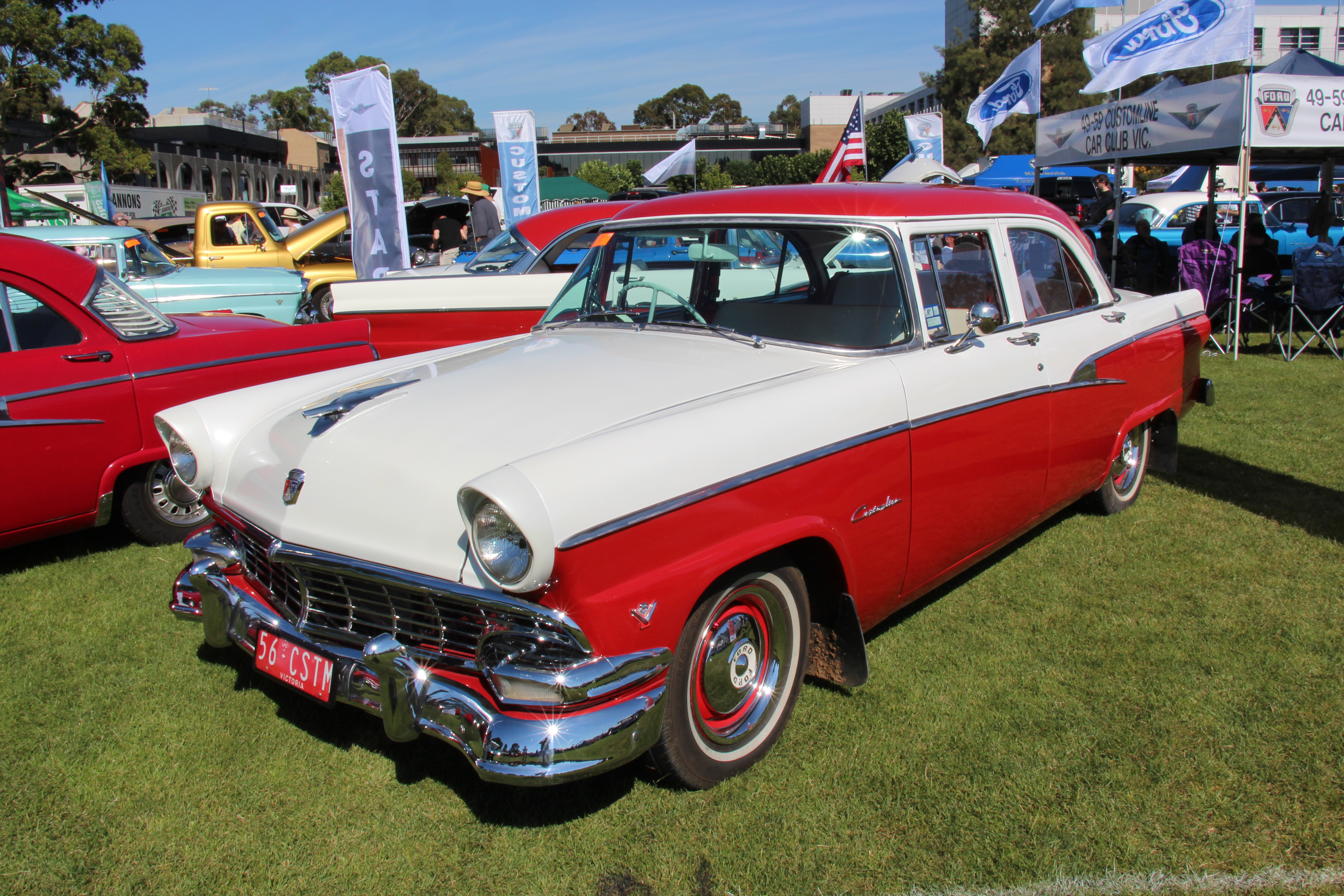
1956 Ford V8 Customline Sedan

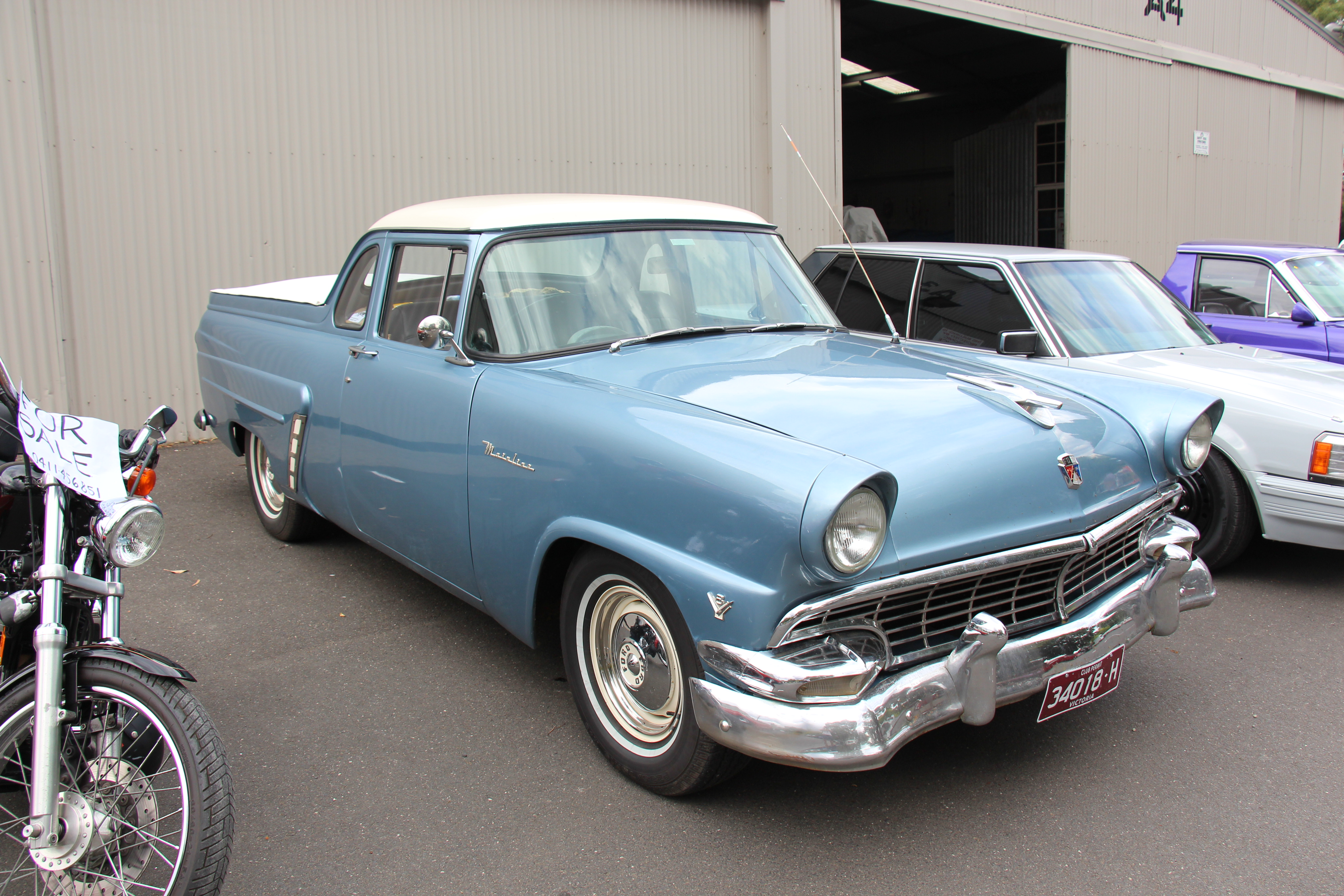
1956 Ford V8 Mainline Utility

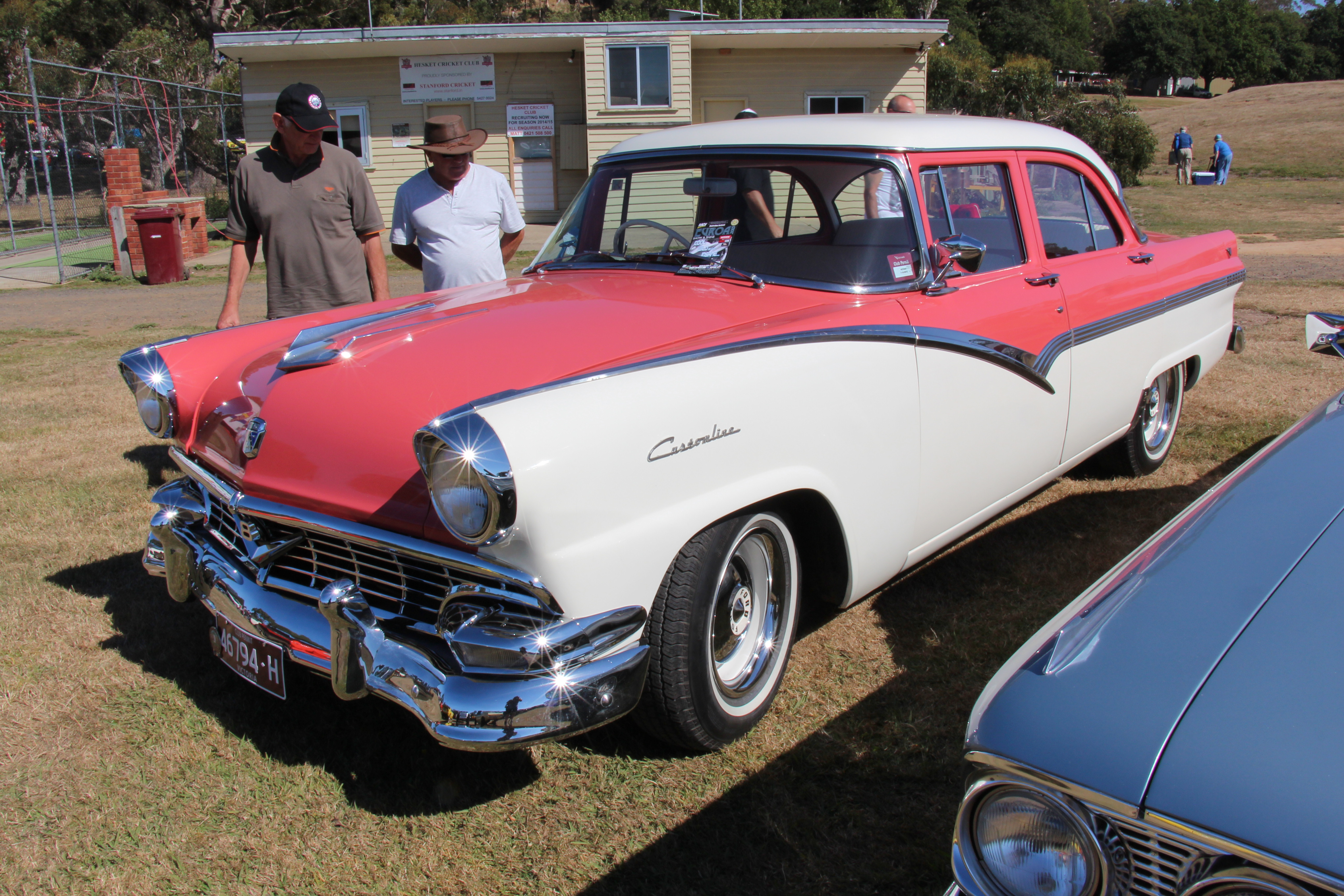
1957 Ford V8 Customline Sedan

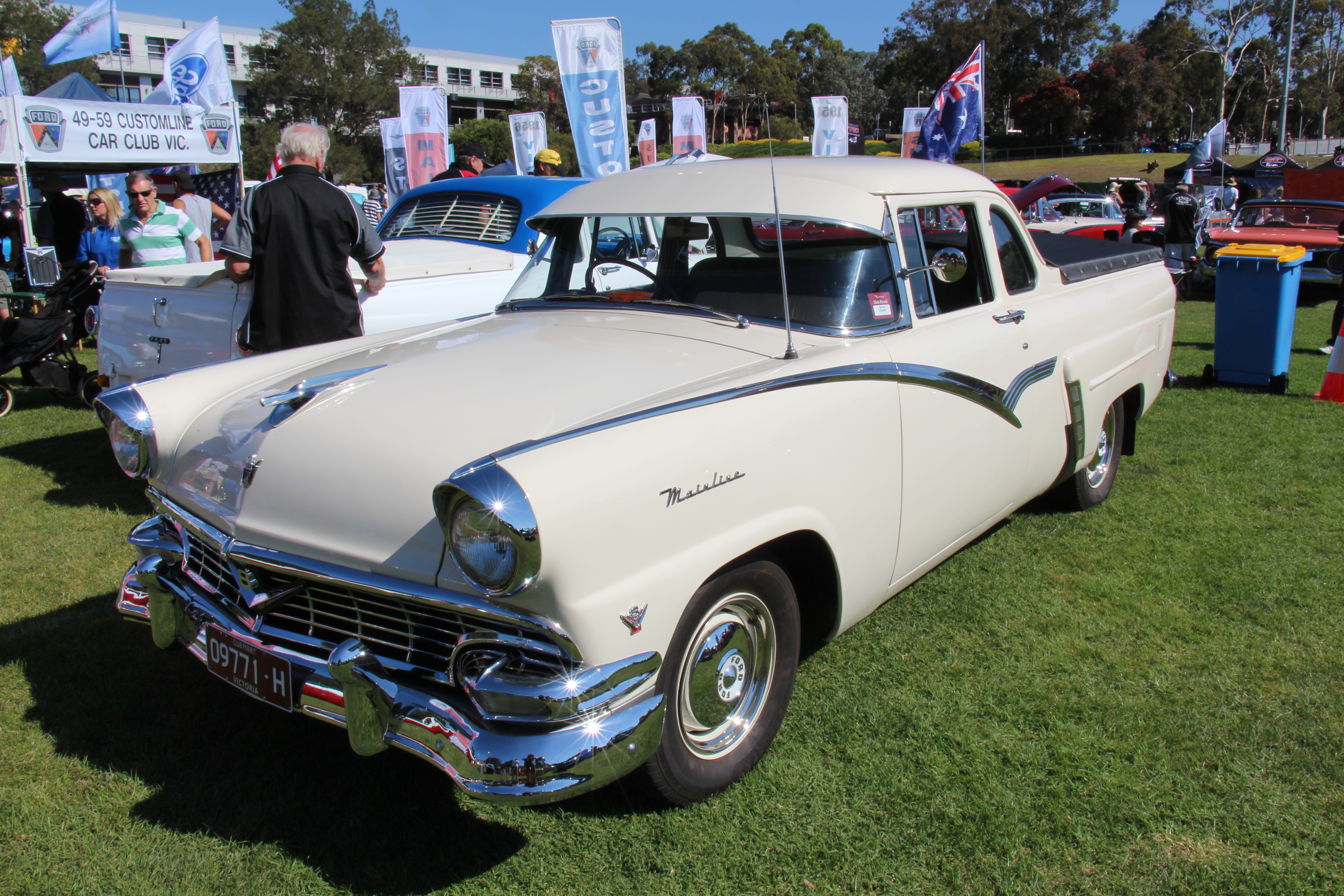
1957 Ford V8 Mainline Utility

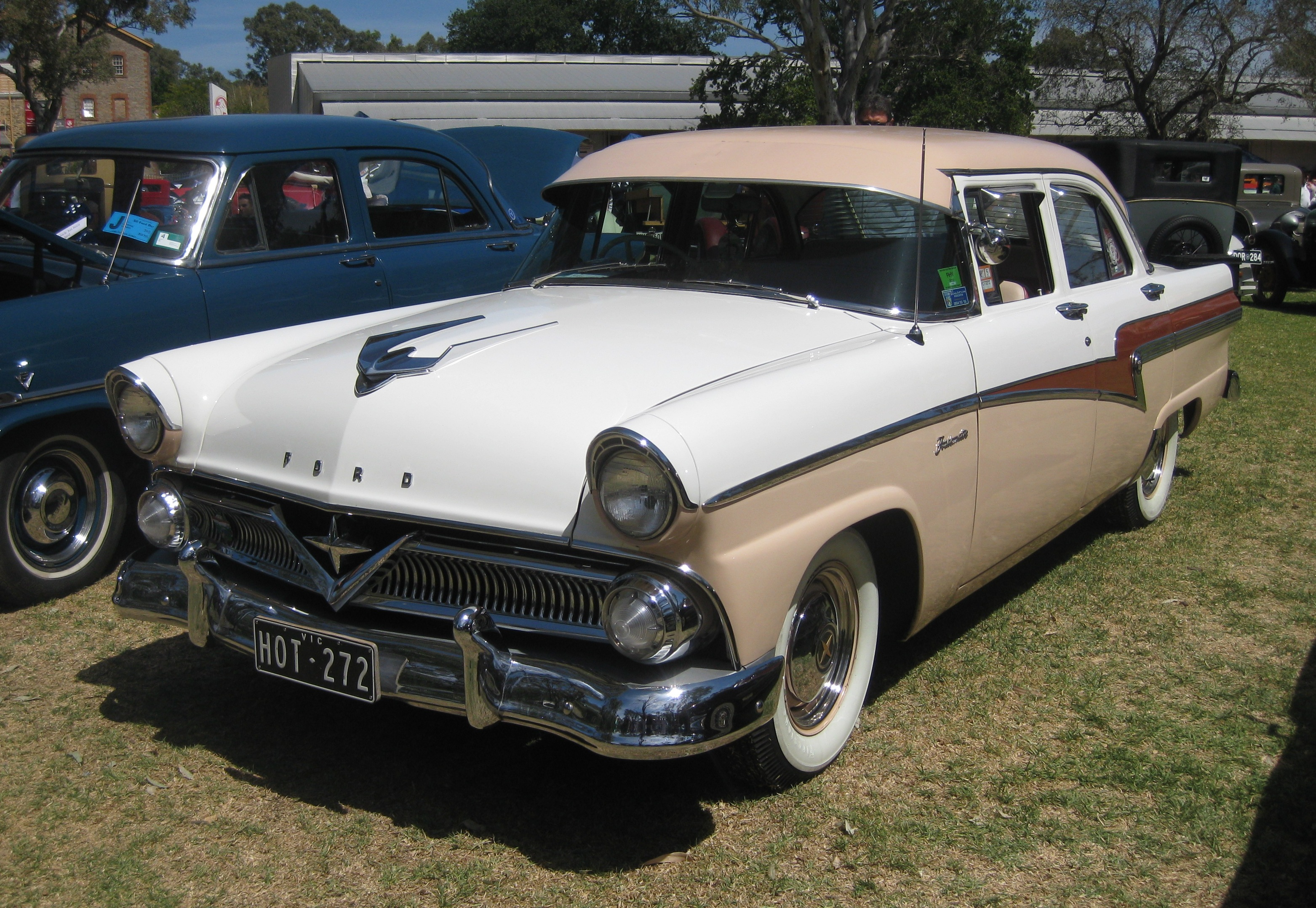
1958 Ford V8 Fordomatic Sedan

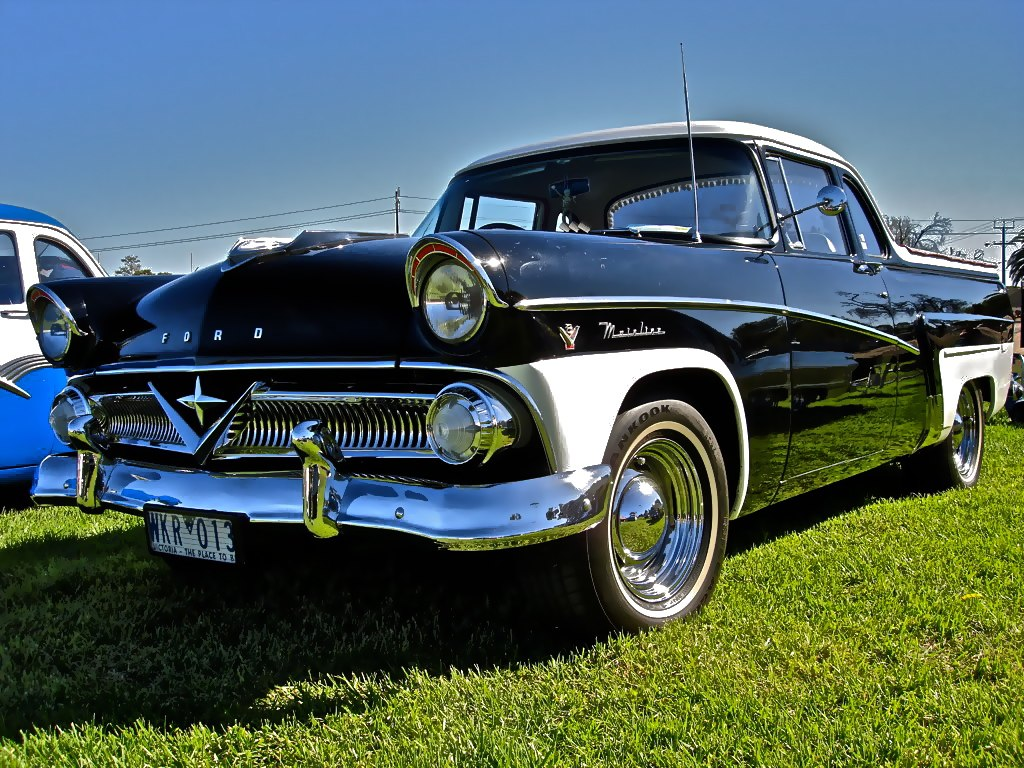
1958 Ford V8 Mainline Utility
