= List of Australian Touring Car and V8 Supercar champions =

The Australian Touring Car Championship, presently known as the Repco Supercars Championship, is a motor racing competition open to Australia's premier touring car category. A driver's title has been awarded since 1960 and titles for teams and manufacturers are also currently awarded. Australia's most famous motor race, the Bathurst 1000, has contributed to the result of the championship since 1999. The second-tier Dunlop Super2 Series has been contested since 2000 and the third-tier V8 Touring Car National Series, for cars no longer officially registered as V8 Supercars, began in 2008 and would officially end at the end of the 2024 season (As the Dunlop Super3 Series) due to being axed in 2025 from low car grid numbers.

== List of Australian Touring Car Championship and Supercars Championship winners ==
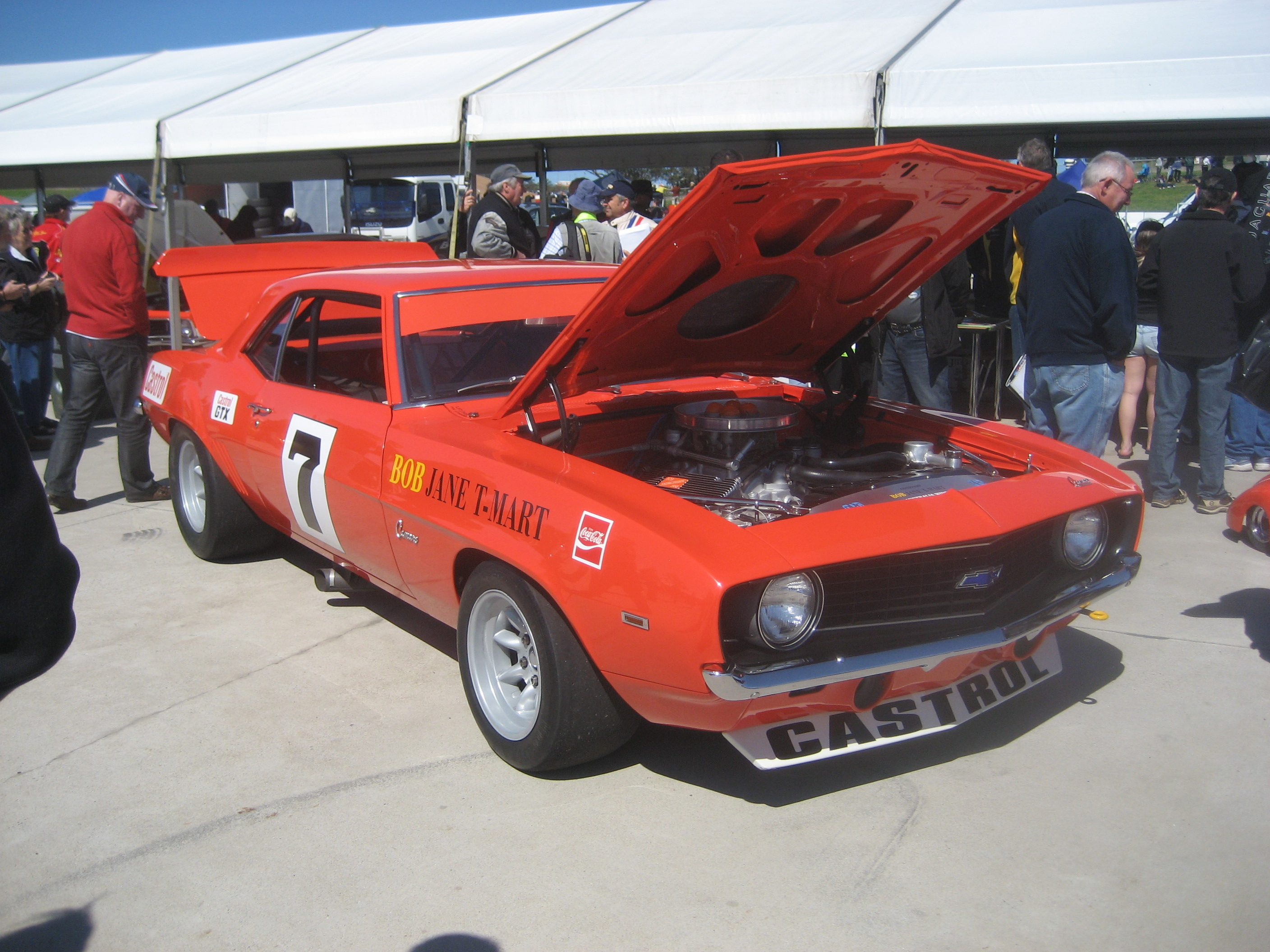
The Chevrolet Camaro ZL-1 in which Bob Jane won the championship in 1971 and 1972.

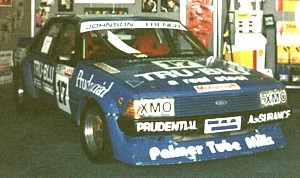
The Ford XD Falcon in which Dick Johnson won the championship in 1981 and 1982.

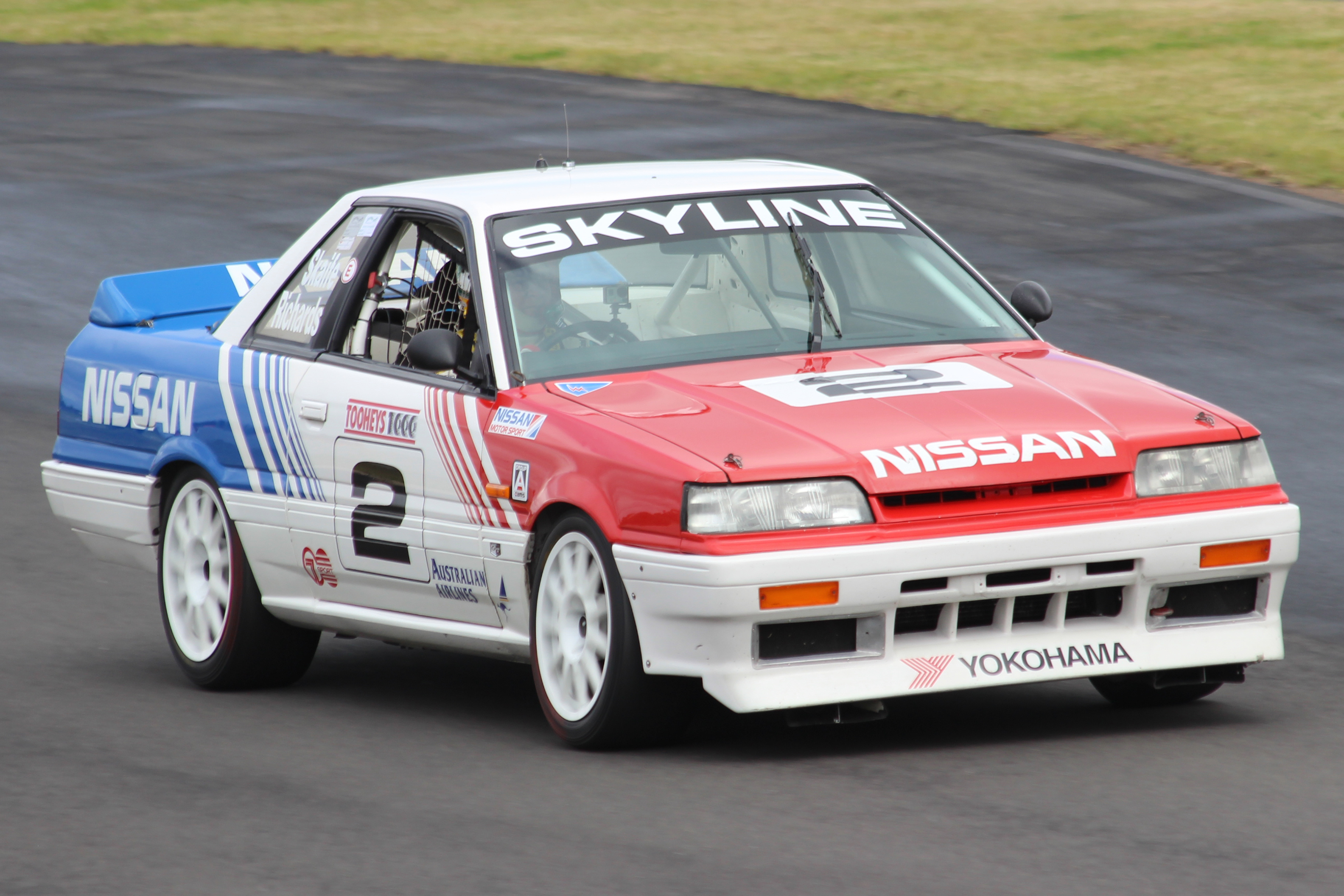
The Nissan Skyline HR31 GTS-R which Jim Richards drove for six races when he won the championship in 1990.

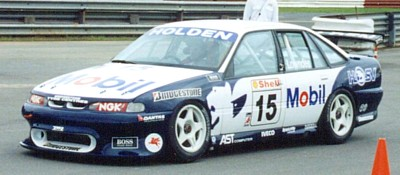
The Holden VR Commodore in which Craig Lowndes won the championship in 1996.

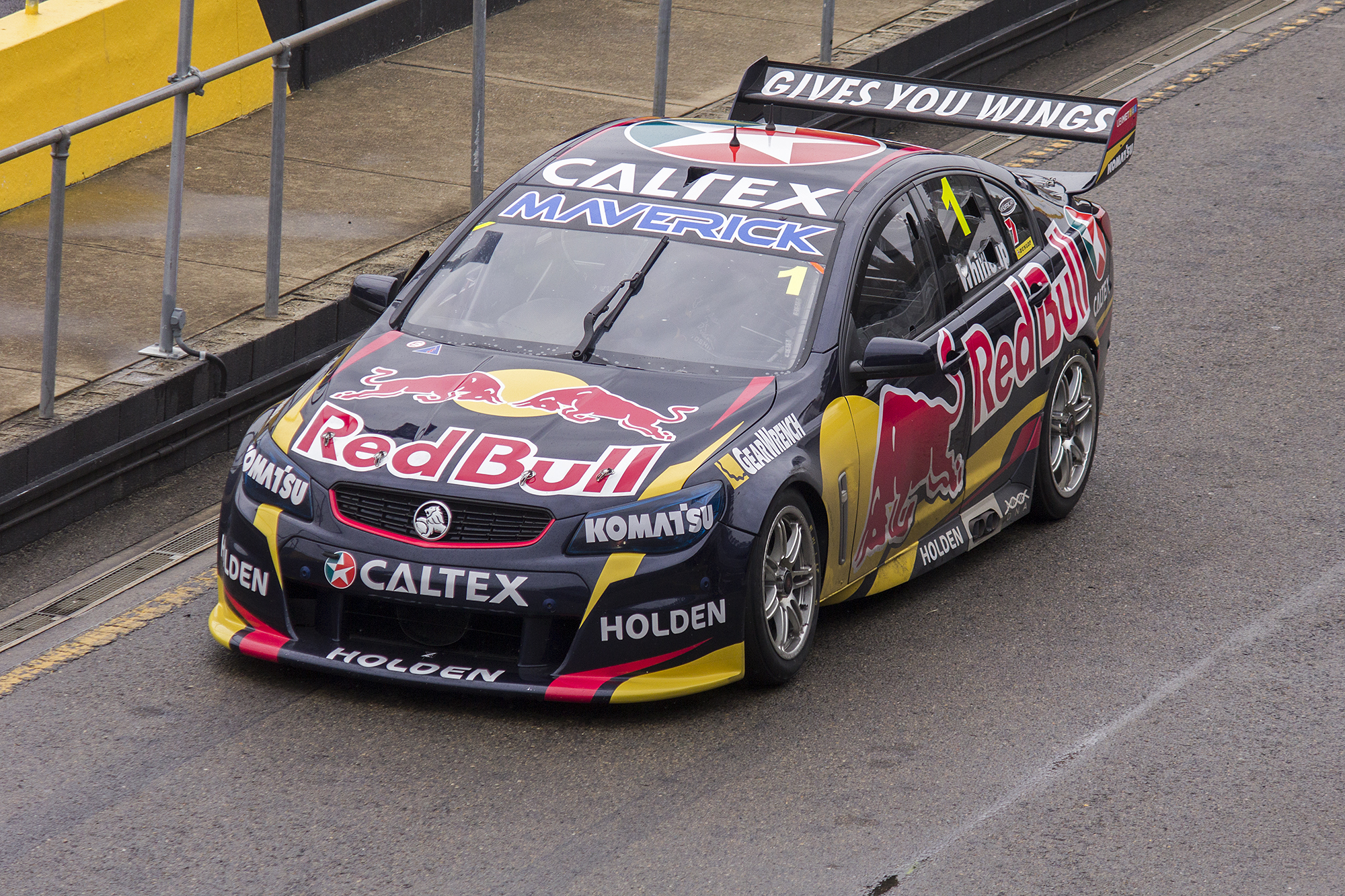
The Holden VF Commodore in which Jamie Whincup won the championship in 2014.

=== By season ===
Year	Driver	Team / Entrant	Car	Series name	
Appendix J
1960	(Australia) David McKay	D. McKay	Jaguar Mark 1 3.4	Australian Touring Car Championship	
1961	(Australia) Bill Pitt	Mrs DI Anderson	Jaguar Mark 1 3.4	Australian Touring Car Championship	
1962	(Australia) Bob Jane		Jaguar Mark 2 3.8	Australian Touring Car Championship	
1963	(Australia) Bob Jane	R. Jane	Jaguar Mark 2 4.1	Australian Touring Car Championship	
1964	(Australia) Ian Geoghegan	Total Team	Ford Cortina Mark I GT	Australian Touring Car Championship	
Improved Production
1965	(Australia) Norm Beechey	Neptune Racing Team	Ford Mustang	Australian Touring Car Championship	
1966	(Australia) Ian Geoghegan	Mustang Team	Ford Mustang	Australian Touring Car Championship	
1967	(Australia) Ian Geoghegan	Mustang Team	Ford Mustang	Australian Touring Car Championship	
1968	(Australia) Ian Geoghegan	Mustang Team	Ford Mustang	Australian Touring Car Championship	
1969	(Australia) Ian Geoghegan	Mustang Team	Ford Mustang	Australian Touring Car Championship	
1970	(Australia) Norm Beechey	Shell Racing Team	Holden HT Monaro GTS350	Australian Touring Car Championship	
1971	(Australia) Bob Jane	Bob Jane Racing Team	Chevrolet Camaro ZL-1	Australian Touring Car Championship	
1972	(Australia) Bob Jane	Bob Jane Racing	Chevrolet Camaro ZL-1	Australian Touring Car Championship	
Group C
1973	(Canada) Allan Moffat	Ford Motor Company	Ford XY Falcon GTHO Phase III	Australian Touring Car Championship	
1974	(Australia) Peter Brock	Holden Dealer Team	Holden LJ Torana GTR XU-1; Holden LH Torana SL/R 5000	Australian Touring Car Championship	
1975	(Australia) Colin Bond	Holden Dealer Team	Holden LH Torana SL/R 5000 L34	Australian Touring Car Championship	
1976	(Canada) Allan Moffat	Allan Moffat Racing	Ford XB Falcon GT	Australian Touring Car Championship	
1977	(Canada) Allan Moffat	Moffat Ford Dealers	Ford XB Falcon GT; Ford XC Falcon GS	Australian Touring Car Championship	
1978	(Australia) Peter Brock	Holden Dealer Team	Holden LX Torana SS A9X	Australian Touring Car Championship	
1979	(Australia) Bob Morris	Ron Hodgson Channel 7 Racing	Holden LX Torana SS A9X	Australian Touring Car Championship	
1980	(Australia) Peter Brock	Holden Dealer Team	Holden VB Commodore	Australian Touring Car Championship	
1981	(Australia) Dick Johnson	Dick Johnson Racing	Ford XD Falcon	Australian Touring Car Championship	
1982	(Australia) Dick Johnson	Dick Johnson Racing	Ford XD Falcon	Australian Touring Car Championship	
1983	(Canada) Allan Moffat	Peter Stuyvesant International Racing	Mazda RX-7	Australian Touring Car Championship	
1984	(Australia) Dick Johnson	Dick Johnson Racing	Ford XE Falcon	Australian Touring Car Championship	
Group A
1985	(New Zealand) Jim Richards	JPS Team BMW	BMW 635 CSi	Australian Touring Car Championship	
1986	(New Zealand) Robbie Francevic	Volvo Dealer Team	Volvo 240T	Australian Touring Car Championship	
1987	(New Zealand) Jim Richards	JPS Team BMW	BMW M3	Australian Touring Car Championship	
1988	(Australia) Dick Johnson	Dick Johnson Racing	Ford Sierra RS500	Australian Touring Car Championship	
1989	(Australia) Dick Johnson	Dick Johnson Racing	Ford Sierra RS500	Australian Touring Car Championship	
1990	(New Zealand) Jim Richards	Gibson Motorsport	Nissan Skyline HR31 GTS-R; Nissan Skyline BNR32 GT-R	Australian Touring Car Championship	
1991	(New Zealand) Jim Richards	Gibson Motorsport	Nissan Skyline BNR32 GT-R	Australian Touring Car Championship	
1992	(Australia) Mark Skaife	Gibson Motorsport	Nissan Skyline BNR32 GT-R	Australian Touring Car Championship	
Group 3A
1993	(Australia) Glenn Seton	Glenn Seton Racing	Ford EB Falcon	Australian Touring Car Championship	
1994	(Australia) Mark Skaife	Gibson Motorsport	Holden VP Commodore	Australian Touring Car Championship	
1995	(Australia) John Bowe	Dick Johnson Racing	Ford EF Falcon	Australian Touring Car Championship	
1996	(Australia) Craig Lowndes	Holden Racing Team	Holden VR Commodore	Australian Touring Car Championship	
V8 Supercars
1997	(Australia) Glenn Seton	Glenn Seton Racing	Ford EL Falcon	Australian Touring Car Championship	
1998	(Australia) Craig Lowndes	Holden Racing Team	Holden VS Commodore; Holden VT Commodore	Australian Touring Car Championship	
1999	(Australia) Craig Lowndes	Holden Racing Team	Holden VT Commodore; Holden VS Commodore	Shell Championship Series	
2000	(Australia) Mark Skaife	Holden Racing Team	Holden VT Commodore	Shell Championship Series	
2001	(Australia) Mark Skaife	Holden Racing Team	Holden VX Commodore	Shell Championship Series	
2002	(Australia) Mark Skaife	Holden Racing Team	Holden VX Commodore	V8 Supercar Championship Series	
Project Blueprint
2003	(Australia) Marcos Ambrose	Stone Brothers Racing	Ford BA Falcon	V8 Supercar Championship Series	
2004	(Australia) Marcos Ambrose	Stone Brothers Racing	Ford BA Falcon	V8 Supercar Championship Series	
2005	(Australia) Russell Ingall	Stone Brothers Racing	Ford BA Falcon	V8 Supercar Championship Series	
2006	(Australia) Rick Kelly	HSV Dealer Team	Holden VZ Commodore	V8 Supercar Championship Series	
2007	(Australia) Garth Tander	HSV Dealer Team	Holden VE Commodore	V8 Supercar Championship Series	
2008	(Australia) Jamie Whincup	Triple Eight Race Engineering	Ford BF Falcon	V8 Supercar Championship Series	
2009	(Australia) Jamie Whincup	Triple Eight Race Engineering	Ford FG Falcon	V8 Supercar Championship Series	
2010	(Australia) James Courtney	Dick Johnson Racing	Ford FG Falcon	V8 Supercar Championship Series	
2011	(Australia) Jamie Whincup	Triple Eight Race Engineering	Holden VE Commodore	International V8 Supercars Championship	
2012	(Australia) Jamie Whincup	Triple Eight Race Engineering	Holden VE Commodore	International V8 Supercars Championship	
New Generation V8 Supercar
2013	(Australia) Jamie Whincup	Triple Eight Race Engineering	Holden VF Commodore	International V8 Supercars Championship	
2014	(Australia) Jamie Whincup	Triple Eight Race Engineering	Holden VF Commodore	International V8 Supercars Championship	
2015	(Australia) Mark Winterbottom	Prodrive Racing Australia	Ford FG X Falcon	International V8 Supercars Championship	
2016	(New Zealand) Shane van Gisbergen	Triple Eight Race Engineering	Holden VF Commodore	Supercars Championship	
2017	(Australia) Jamie Whincup	Triple Eight Race Engineering	Holden VF Commodore	Supercars Championship	
Gen 2 Supercar
2018	(New Zealand) Scott McLaughlin	DJR Team Penske	Ford FG X Falcon	Supercars Championship	
2019	(New Zealand) Scott McLaughlin	DJR Team Penske	Ford Mustang GT	Supercars Championship	
2020	(New Zealand) Scott McLaughlin	DJR Team Penske	Ford Mustang GT	Supercars Championship	
2021	(New Zealand) Shane van Gisbergen	Triple Eight Race Engineering	Holden Commodore ZB	Supercars Championship	
2022	(New Zealand) Shane van Gisbergen	Triple Eight Race Engineering	Holden Commodore ZB	Supercars Championship	
Gen 3 Supercar
2023	(Australia) Brodie Kostecki	Erebus Motorsport	Chevrolet Camaro ZL1-1LE	Supercars Championship	
2024	(Australia) Will Brown	Triple Eight Race Engineering	Chevrolet Camaro ZL1-1LE	Supercars Championship	
2025	(Australia) Chaz Mostert	Walkinshaw Andretti United	Ford Mustang S650	Supercars Championship	Sources:

Note: The Confederation of Australian Motor Sport awarded the Australian Touring Car Championship title to the winner of the V8 Supercar Championship Series from 1999 to 2010, and to the winner of the International V8 Supercars Championship since 2011. The category had changed its name to V8 Supercars in 1997, but the championship was still called the ATCC for 1997 and 1998.

=== By driver ===
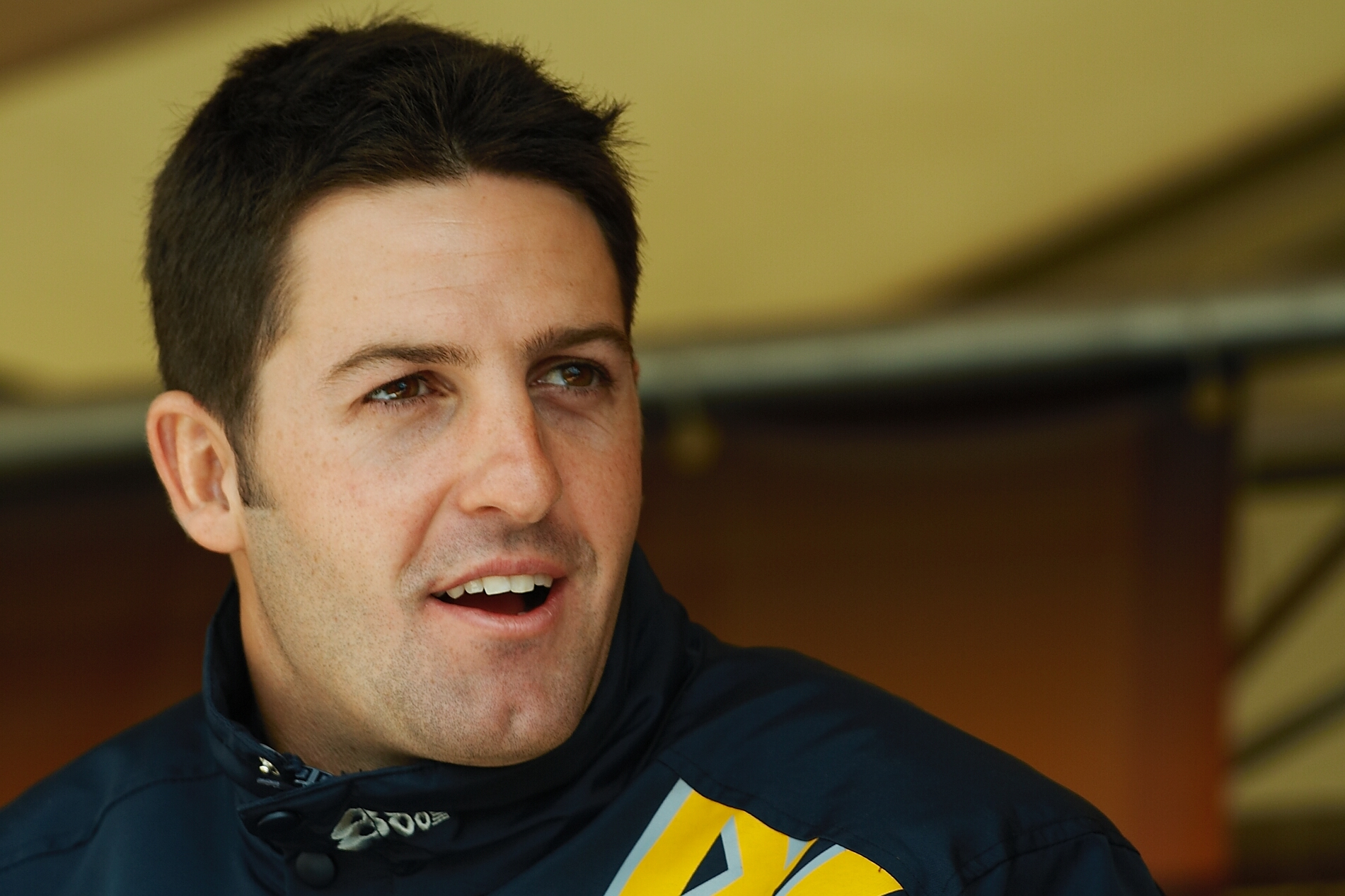
Jamie Whincup has won the most championships, with seven.

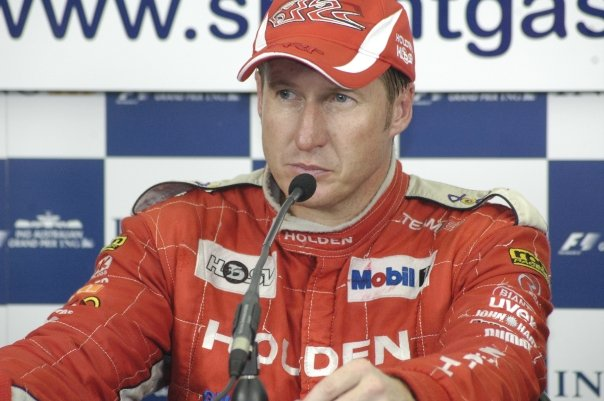
Mark Skaife won the championship five times.

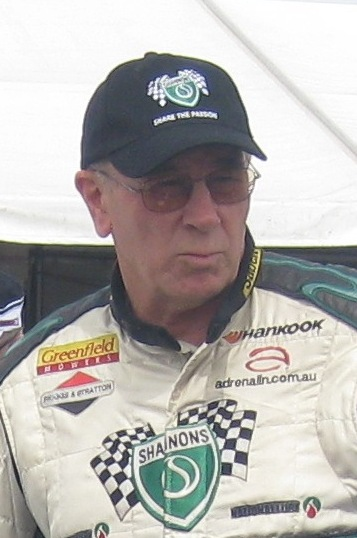
Jim Richards is the most successful New Zealand driver with four championship wins.

Driver	Championships	Season(s)	Championship winner
(Australia) Jamie Whincup	7	2008, 2009, 2011, 2012, 2013, 2014, 2017	21st
(Australia) Ian Geoghegan	5	1964, 1966, 1967, 1968, 1969	4th
(Australia) Dick Johnson	5	1981, 1982, 1984, 1988, 1989	10th
(Australia) Mark Skaife	5	1992, 1994, 2000, 2001, 2002	13th
(Australia) Bob Jane	4	1962, 1963, 1971, 1972	3rd
(Canada) Allan Moffat	4	1973, 1976, 1977, 1983	6th
(New Zealand) Jim Richards	4	1985, 1987, 1990, 1991	11th
(Australia) Peter Brock	3	1974, 1978, 1980	7th
(Australia) Craig Lowndes	3	1996, 1998, 1999	16th
(New Zealand) Shane van Gisbergen	3	2016, 2021, 2022	24th
(New Zealand) Scott McLaughlin	3	2018, 2019, 2020	25th
(Australia) Norm Beechey	2	1965, 1970	5th
(Australia) Glenn Seton	2	1993, 1997	14th
(Australia) Marcos Ambrose	2	2003, 2004	17th
(Australia) David McKay	1	1960	1st
(Australia) Bill Pitt	1	1961	2nd
(Australia) Colin Bond	1	1975	8th
(Australia) Bob Morris	1	1979	9th
(New Zealand) Robbie Francevic	1	1986	12th
(Australia) John Bowe	1	1995	15th
(Australia) Russell Ingall	1	2005	18th
(Australia) Rick Kelly	1	2006	19th
(Australia) Garth Tander	1	2007	20th
(Australia) James Courtney	1	2010	22nd
(Australia) Mark Winterbottom	1	2015	23rd
(Australia) Brodie Kostecki	1	2023	26th
(Australia) Will Brown	1	2024	27th
(Australia) Chaz Mostert	1	2025	28th

== List of V8 Supercar Teams' Championship winners ==
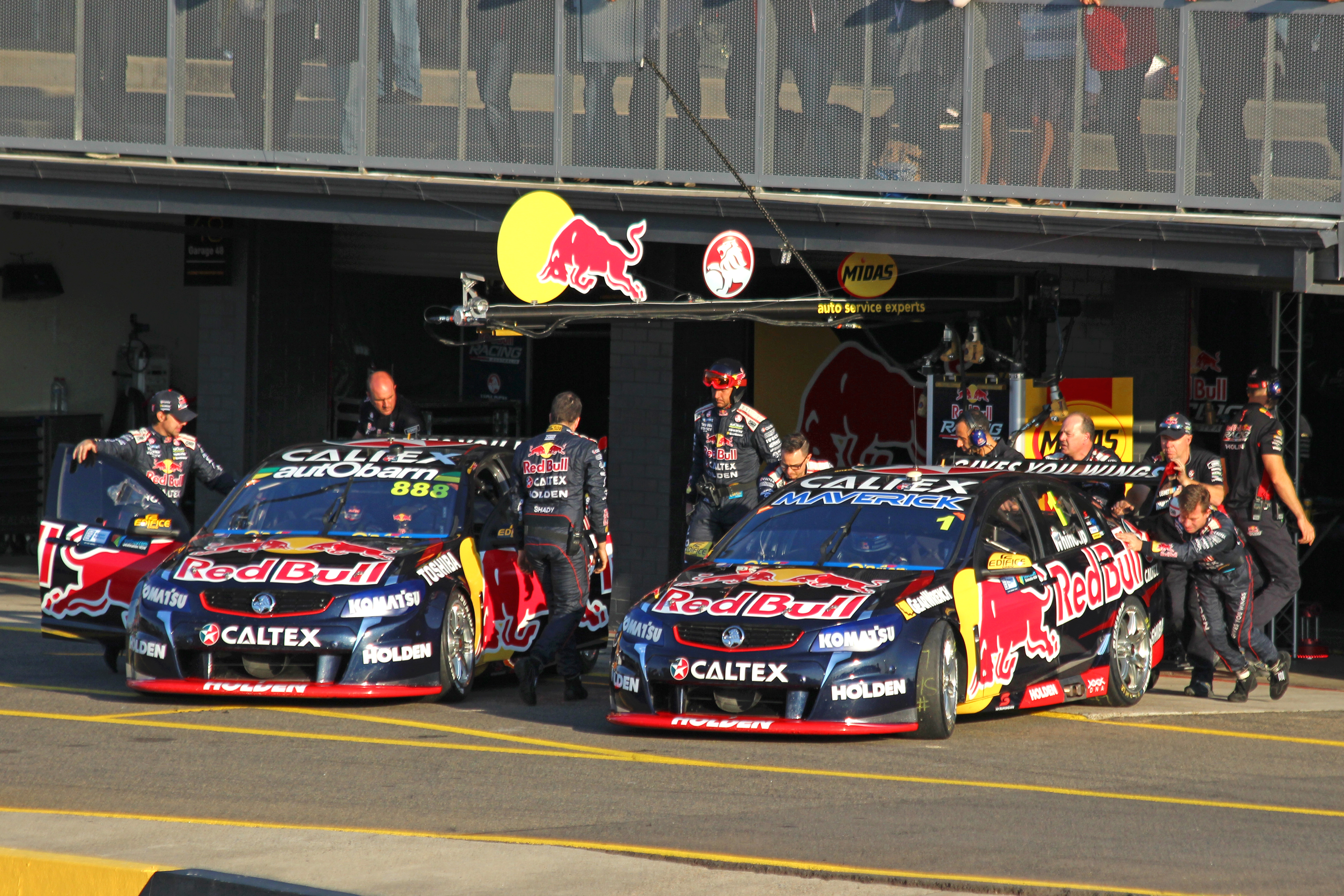
Triple Eight Race Engineering have won the Teams' Championship eleven times.

Year	Team	Drivers	Car
1999	Holden Racing Team	(Australia) Craig Lowndes (Australia) Cameron McConville (Australia) Mark Skaife	Holden VT Commodore; Holden VS Commodore
2000	Holden Racing Team	(Australia) Craig Lowndes (Australia) Mark Skaife	Holden VT Commodore
2001	Holden Racing Team	(Australia) Mark Skaife (Australia) Jason Bright	Holden VX Commodore
2002	Holden Racing Team	(Australia) Mark Skaife (Australia) Jason Bright	Holden VX Commodore
2003	Stone Brothers Racing	(Australia) Marcos Ambrose (Australia) Russell Ingall	Ford BA Falcon
2004	Stone Brothers Racing	(Australia) Marcos Ambrose (Australia) Russell Ingall	Ford BA Falcon
2005	Stone Brothers Racing	(Australia) Marcos Ambrose (Australia) Russell Ingall	Ford BA Falcon
2006	HSV Dealer Team	(Australia) Rick Kelly (Australia) Garth Tander	Holden VZ Commodore
2007	HSV Dealer Team	(Australia) Rick Kelly (Australia) Garth Tander	Holden VE Commodore
2008	Triple Eight Race Engineering	(Australia) Jamie Whincup (Australia) Craig Lowndes	Ford BF Falcon
2009	Holden Racing Team	(Australia) Garth Tander (Australia) Will Davison	Holden VE Commodore
2010	Triple Eight Race Engineering	(Australia) Jamie Whincup (Australia) Craig Lowndes	Holden VE Commodore
2011	Triple Eight Race Engineering	(Australia) Jamie Whincup (Australia) Craig Lowndes	Holden VE Commodore
2012	Triple Eight Race Engineering	(Australia) Jamie Whincup (Australia) Craig Lowndes	Holden VE Commodore
2013	Triple Eight Race Engineering	(Australia) Jamie Whincup (Australia) Craig Lowndes	Holden VF Commodore
2014	Triple Eight Race Engineering	(Australia) Jamie Whincup (Australia) Craig Lowndes	Holden VF Commodore
2015	Triple Eight Race Engineering	(Australia) Jamie Whincup (Australia) Craig Lowndes	Holden VF Commodore
2016	Triple Eight Race Engineering	(Australia) Jamie Whincup (New Zealand) Shane van Gisbergen	Holden VF Commodore
2017	DJR Team Penske	(New Zealand) Fabian Coulthard (New Zealand) Scott McLaughlin	Ford FG X Falcon
2018	Triple Eight Race Engineering	(Australia) Jamie Whincup (New Zealand) Shane van Gisbergen	Holden ZB Commodore
2019	DJR Team Penske	(New Zealand) Fabian Coulthard (New Zealand) Scott McLaughlin	Ford Mustang GT
2020	DJR Team Penske	(New Zealand) Fabian Coulthard (New Zealand) Scott McLaughlin	Ford Mustang GT
2021	Triple Eight Race Engineering	(Australia) Jamie Whincup (New Zealand) Shane van Gisbergen	Holden ZB Commodore
2022	Triple Eight Race Engineering	(Australia) Broc Feeney (New Zealand) Shane van Gisbergen	Holden ZB Commodore
2023	Erebus Motorsport	(Australia) Will Brown (Australia) Brodie Kostecki	Chevrolet Camaro ZL1-1LE
2024	Triple Eight Race Engineering	(Australia) Will Brown (Australia) Broc Feeney	Chevrolet Camaro ZL1-1LE
2025	Triple Eight Race Engineering	(Australia) Will Brown (Australia) Broc Feeney	Chevrolet Camaro ZL1-1LE

== List of V8 Supercar Manufacturers' Championship winners ==
Year	Manufacturer
2000	Holden
2001	Holden
2002	Holden
2003	Ford
2004	Holden
2005	Ford
2006	Ford
2007	Holden
2008	Ford
2009	Ford
2010	Holden
2011	Holden
2012	Holden
2013	Holden
2014	Holden
2015	Holden
2016	Holden
2017	Ford
2018	Holden
2019	Ford
2020	Ford
2021	Holden
2022	Holden
2023	Chevrolet
2024	Chevrolet
2025	Chevrolet

== List of V8 Supercar Development Series winners ==
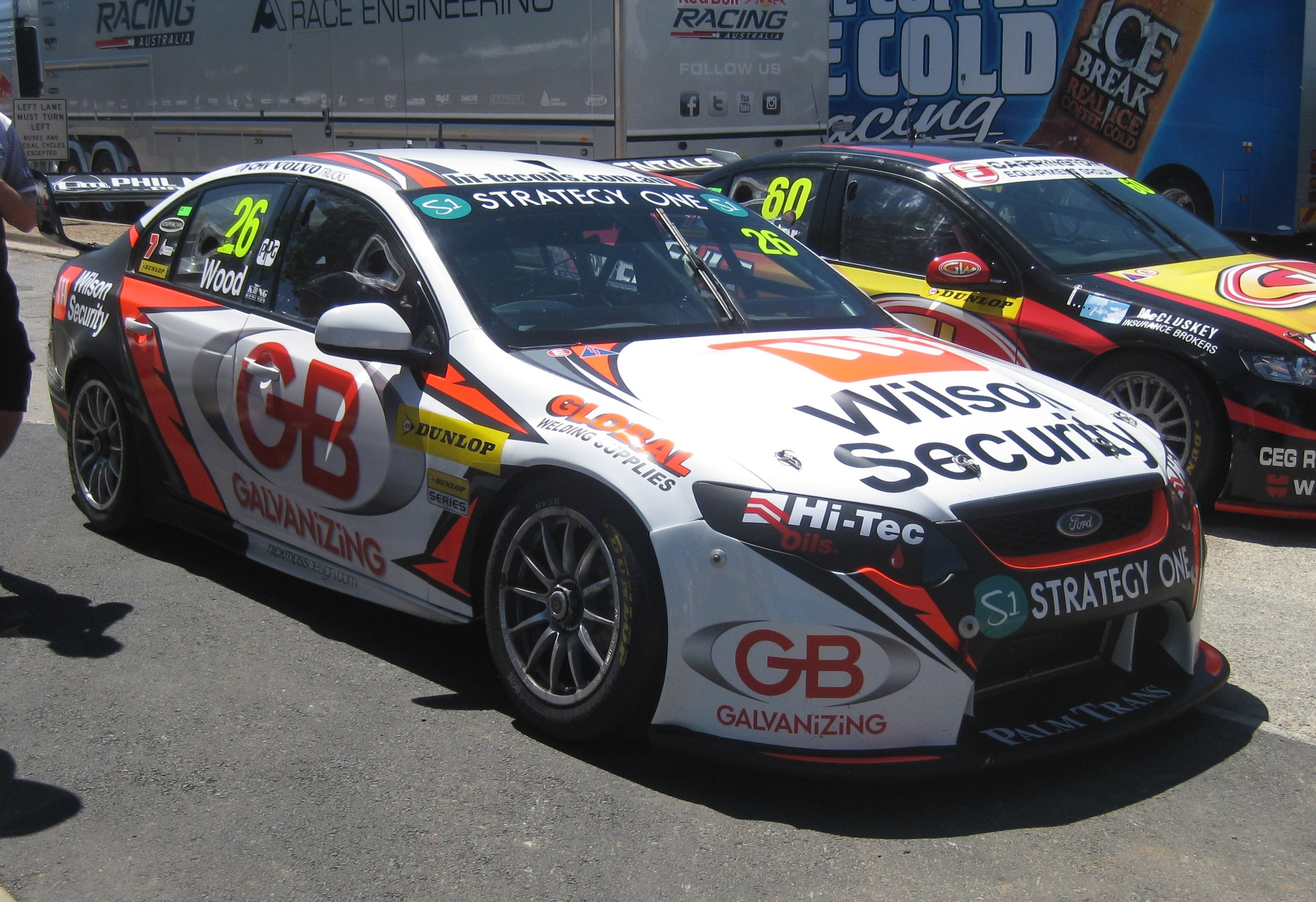
The Ford FG Falcon in which Dale Wood won the 2013 Dunlop V8 Supercar Series.

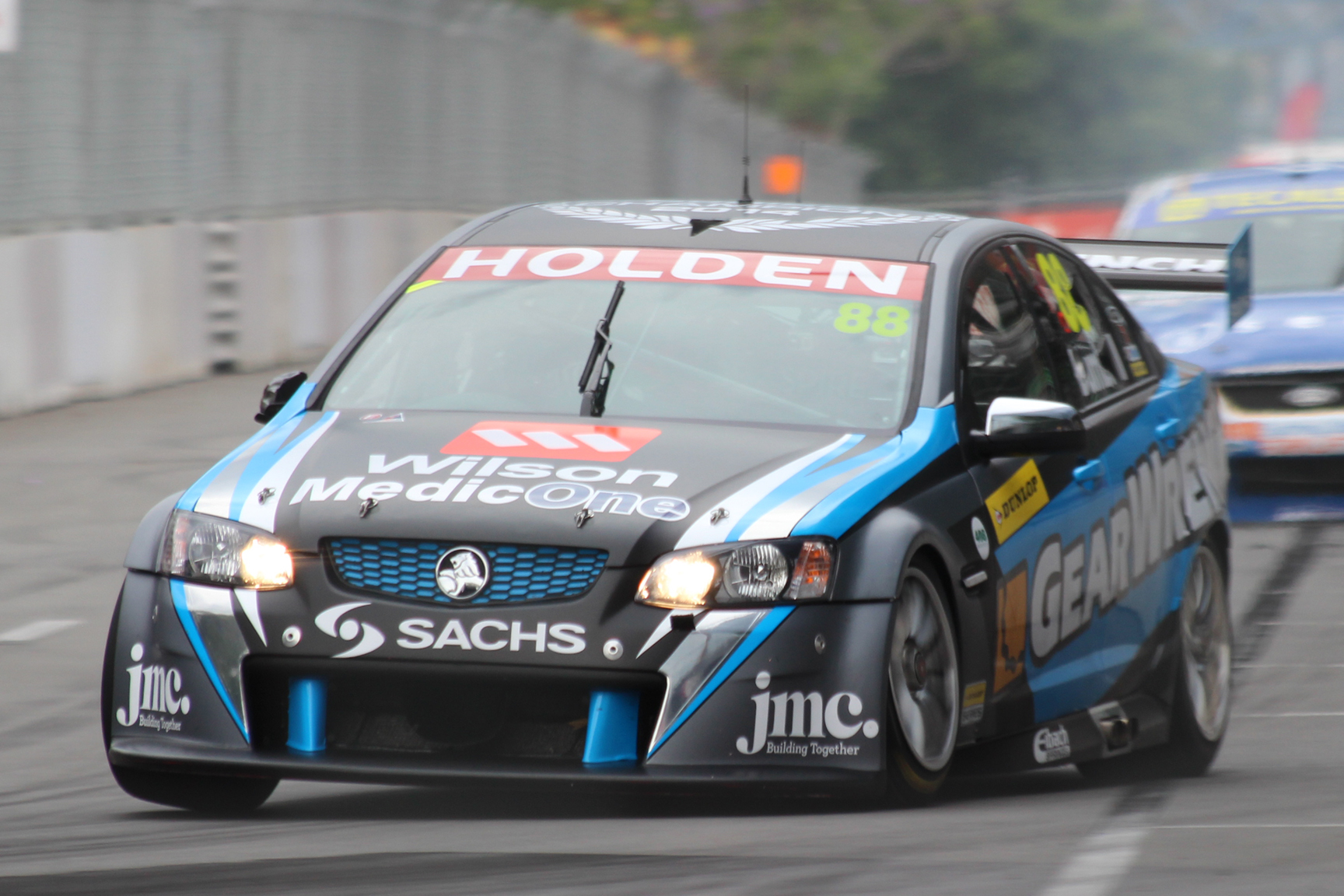
The Holden VE Commodore in which Paul Dumbrell won the 2014 Dunlop V8 Supercar Series.

Year	Driver	Team	Car	Series name
2000	(Australia) Dean Canto	RPM International Racing	Ford EL Falcon	Konica V8 Lites Series
2001	(New Zealand) Simon Wills	Team Dynamik	Holden VT Commodore	Konica V8 Supercar Series
2002	(Australia) Paul Dumbrell	Independent Race Cars Australia	Holden VX Commodore	Konica V8 Supercar Series
2003	(Australia) Mark Winterbottom	Stone Brothers Racing	Ford AU Falcon	Konica V8 Supercar Series
2004	(Australia) Andrew Jones	Brad Jones Racing	Ford AU Falcon	Konica Minolta V8 Supercar Series
2005	(Australia) Dean Canto	Dick Johnson Racing	Ford BA Falcon	Holden Performance Driving Centre V8 Supercar Series
2006	(Australia) Adam Macrow	Howard Racing	Ford BA Falcon	Fujitsu V8 Supercar Series
2007	(Australia) Tony D'Alberto	Tony D'Alberto Racing	Holden VZ Commodore	Fujitsu V8 Supercar Series
2008	(Australia) Steve Owen	Scott Loadsman Racing	Holden VZ Commodore	Fujitsu V8 Supercar Series
2009	(Australia) Jonathon Webb	MW Motorsport	Ford BF Falcon	Fujitsu V8 Supercar Series
2010	(Australia) Steve Owen	Greg Murphy Racing	Holden VE Commodore	Fujitsu V8 Supercar Series
2011	(Australia) Andrew Thompson	Triple Eight Race Engineering	Holden VE Commodore	Fujitsu V8 Supercar Series
2012	(New Zealand) Scott McLaughlin	Stone Brothers Racing; Matt Stone Racing	Ford FG Falcon	Dunlop V8 Supercar Series
2013	(Australia) Dale Wood	MW Motorsport	Ford FG Falcon	Dunlop V8 Supercar Series
2014	(Australia) Paul Dumbrell	Eggleston Motorsport	Holden VE Commodore	Dunlop V8 Supercar Series
2015	(Australia) Cameron Waters	Prodrive Racing Australia	Ford FG Falcon	V8 Supercars Dunlop Series
2016	(Australia) Garry Jacobson	Prodrive Racing Australia	Ford FG X Falcon	Supercars Dunlop Series
2017	(Australia) Todd Hazelwood	Matt Stone Racing	Holden VF Commodore	Dunlop Super2 Series
2018	(New Zealand) Chris Pither	Garry Rogers Motorsport	Holden VF Commodore	Dunlop Super2 Series
2019	(Australia) Bryce Fullwood	MW Motorsport	Nissan Altima L33	Dunlop Super2 Series
2020	(Australia) Thomas Randle	MW Motorsport	Nissan Altima L33	Dunlop Super2 Series
2021	(Australia) Broc Feeney	Triple Eight Race Engineering	Holden Commodore VF	Dunlop Super2 Series
2022	(Australia) Declan Fraser	Triple Eight Race Engineering	Holden Commodore VF	Dunlop Super2 Series
2023	(Australia) Kai Allen	Eggleston Motorsport	Holden Commodore ZB	Dunlop Super2 Series
2024	(Australia) Zach Bates	Walkinshaw Andretti United	Holden Commodore ZB	Dunlop Super2 Series
2025	(Australia) Rylan Gray	Tickford Racing	Ford Mustang GT	Dunlop Super2 Series

== List of V8 Touring Car National Series winners ==
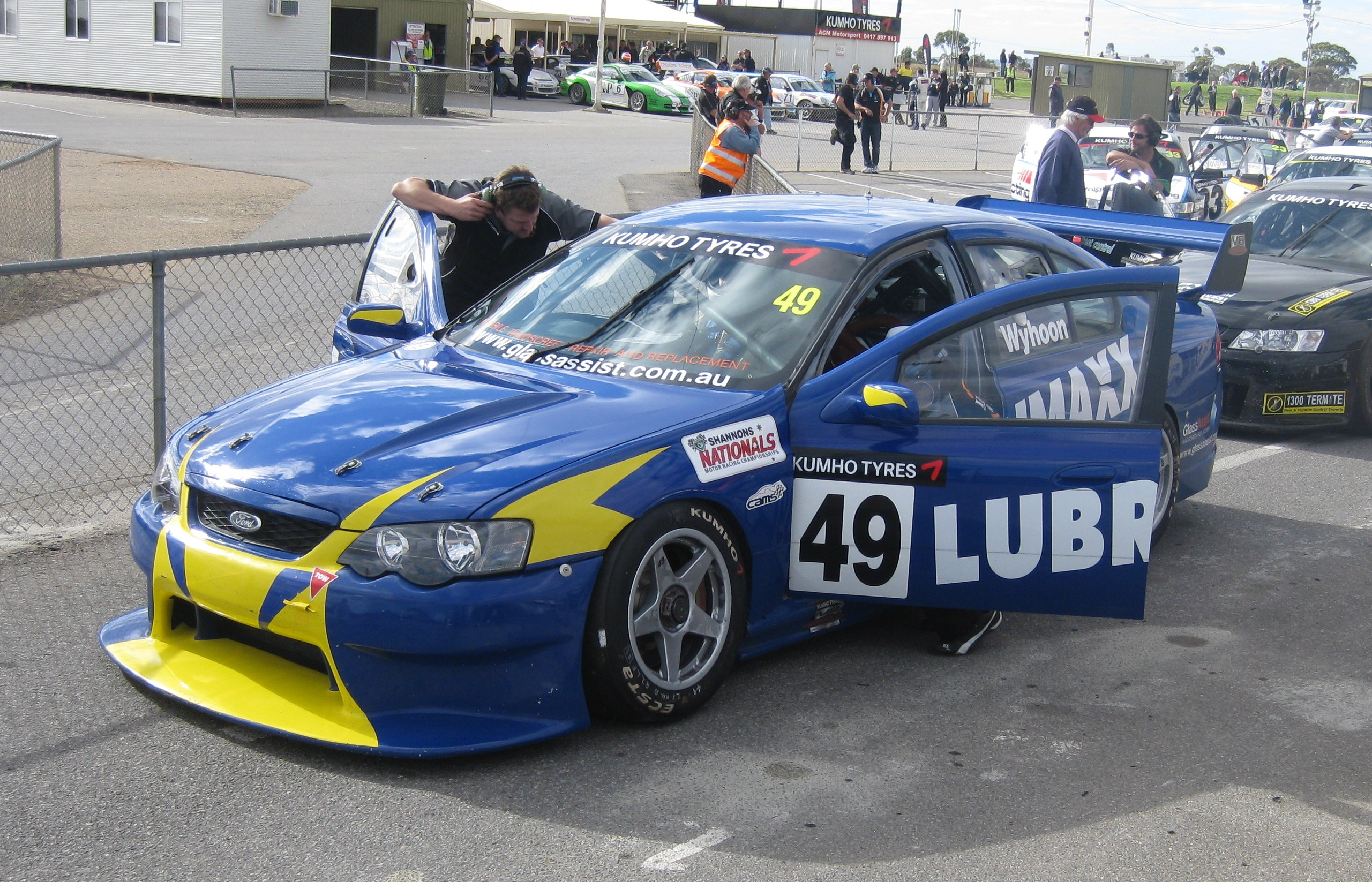
The Ford BA Falcon in which Terry Wyhoon won the 2011 Kumho V8 Touring Car Series.

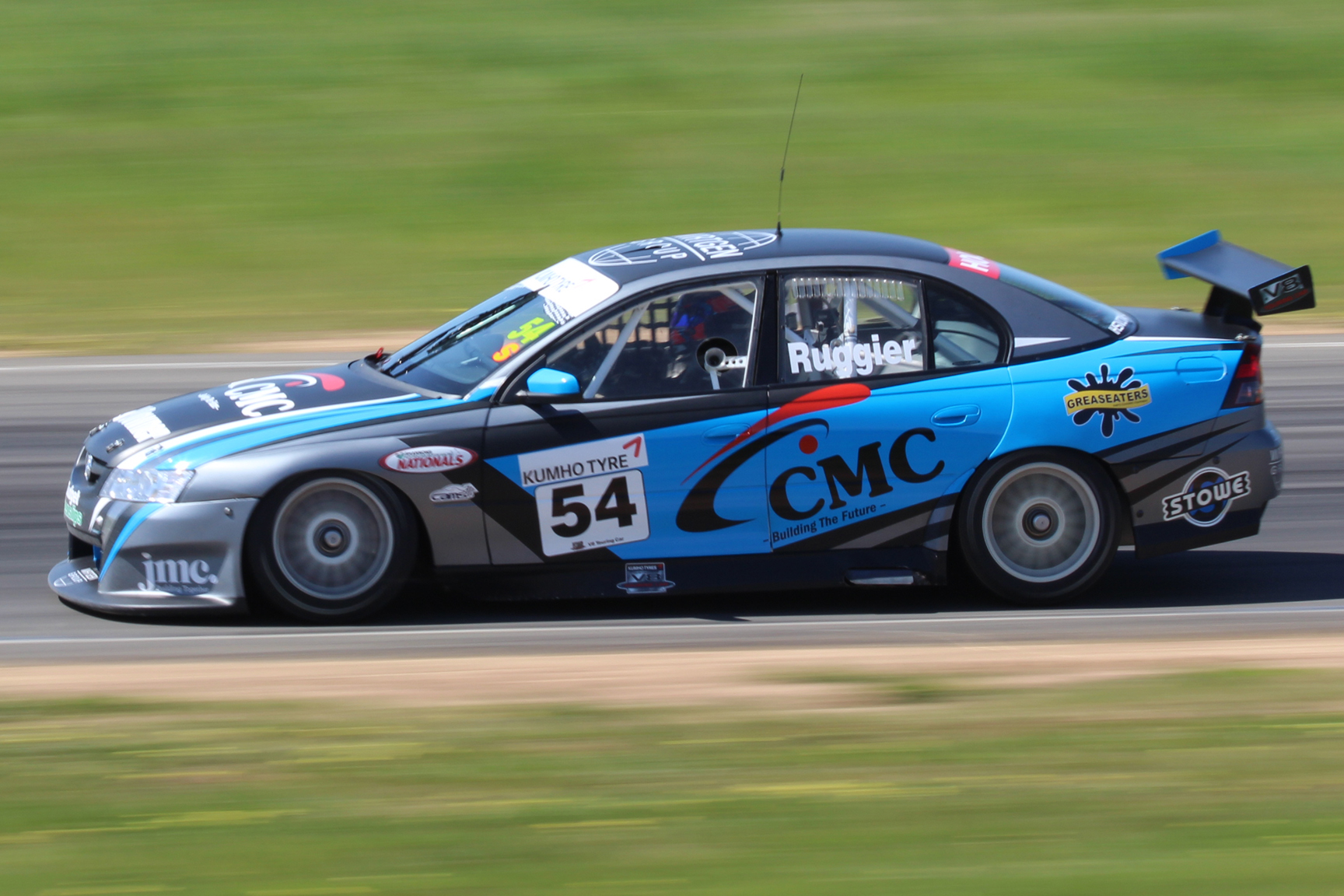
The Holden VZ Commodore in which Justin Ruggier won the 2014 Kumho Tyres V8 Touring Car Series.

Year	Driver	Team	Car	Series name
2008	(Australia) Chris Smerdon	Challenge Motorsport	Ford AU Falcon	Shannons V8 Touring Car National Series
2009	(Australia) Adam Wallis	Warrin Mining	Holden VX Commodore	Shannons V8 Touring Car National Series
2010	(Australia) Tony Evangelou	ANT Racing	Ford BA Falcon	Shannons V8 Touring Car National Series
2011	(Australia) Terry Wyhoon	Image Racing	Ford BA Falcon	Kumho V8 Touring Car Series
2012	(Australia) Josh Hunter	Fernandez Motorsport	Ford BA Falcon	Kumho Tyres V8 Touring Car Series
2013	(Australia) Shae Davies	Fernandez Motorsport	Ford BA Falcon	Kumho Tyres V8 Touring Car Series
2014	(Australia) Justin Ruggier	Eggleston Motorsport	Holden VZ Commodore	Kumho Tyres V8 Touring Car Series
2015	(Australia) Liam McAdam	Eggleston Motorsport	Holden VZ Commodore	Kumho Tyres V8 Touring Car Series
2016	(Australia) Taz Douglas	THR Developments	Holden VE Commodore	Kumho Tyres V8 Touring Car Series
2017	(Australia) Jack Smith	Brad Jones Racing	Holden VE Commodore	Kumho Tyres V8 Touring Car Series
2018	(Australia) Tyler Everingham	MW Motorsport	Ford FG Falcon	Kumho Tyres V8 Touring Car Series
2019	(Australia) Broc Feeney	Paul Morris Motorsport	Ford FG Falcon	Kumho Tyre Super3 Series
2020	no championship awarded			Super3 Series
2021	(Australia) Nash Morris	Paul Morris Motorsport	Ford FG Falcon	Dunlop Super3 Series
2022	(Australia) Brad Vaughan	Anderson Motorsport	Ford FG Falcon	Dunlop Super3 Series
2023	(Australia) Jobe Stewart	Image Racing	Holden VF Commodore	Dunlop Super3 Series
2023	(Australia) Jude Bargwanna	Anderson Motorsport	Ford FG Falcon	Kumho Tyres Australian V8 Touring Car Series
2024	(Australia) Cody Burcher	MW Motorsport	Nissan Altima	Dunlop Super3 Series

== See also ==
- List of Australian Touring Car Championship races
