= Jaguar 2.4 Litre =

Jaguar 2.4 Litre may refer to:

- An automobile produced by Jaguar Cars as part of its Jaguar Mark 1 range between 1955 and 1959
- An automobile produced by Jaguar Cars as part of its Jaguar Mark 2 range between 1959 and 1967
