= 1953 New South Wales Grand Prix =

Motor race in Australia

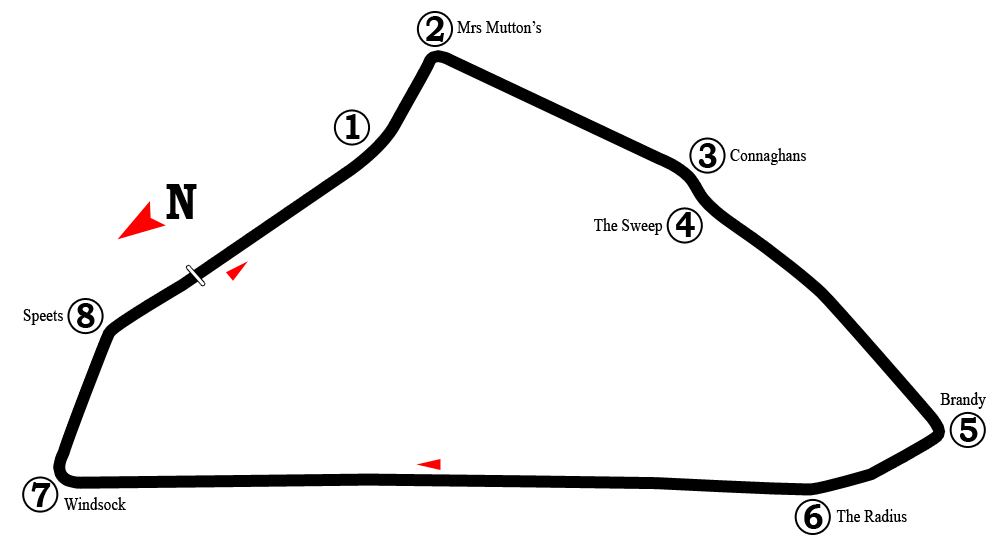
Track map of the Gnoo Blas Motor Racing Circuit (1953-1961)

The 1953 New South Wales Grand Prix was a motor race held at the Gnoo Blas Motor Racing Circuit, Orange, New South Wales, Australia on 5 October 1953. The race, which was organised by the Australian Sporting Car Club, was contested over a distance of 100 miles (161 km). It was staged on a handicap basis with prize money allocated for the first ten handicap positions and additional prizes offered for the first three scratch placings.

The handicap award was won by Jack Robinson (Jaguar XK120 Special) whilst the Grand Prix title was awarded to Jack Brabham (Cooper Bristol) who had set the fastest race time.

== Results ==
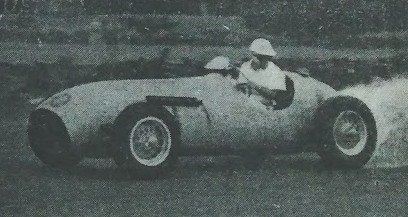
Jack Robinson won the handicap award driving a Jaguar XK120 Special

=== Handicap Placings ===
Position	Driver	No.	Car	Entrant	Handicap	Laps / Remarks
1	Jack Robinson	20	Jaguar XK120 Special	J. H. Robinson	6m 5s	28
2	Alec Mildren	63	MG TC Special	A. G. Mildren	10m 15s	
3	Peter Lowe	13	Bugatti Type 37 Holden	P. Lowe		
4	Jack Brabham	1	Cooper Type 23 Bristol	J. A. Brabham	Scratch	
5	Larry Humphries	18	Jaguar XK120 Special	L. Humphfries		
6	Clive Adams	47	Prad	C. W. Adams		
7	Curly Brydon	41	MG TC s/c	A. H. Brydon		
8	Frank Dynon	81	MG TC	F. Dynon		
9	Jack Murray	30	Bug Ford	J. E. Murray		
10	W. Clarke	38	HRG	W. Clarke		
DNF	David McKay		MG TC			Bearings
DNF	Col James	79	MG TC	Barclay Motors		Bearings
DNF	Dick Cobden		Riley-Rizzo Special			Bearings
DNF	Tom Sulman	28	Maserati 4C	T. N. Sulman		Thrown treads

=== Fastest Times ===
Position	Driver	No.	Car	Entrant	Time
1	Jack Brabham	1	Cooper Type 23 Bristol	J. A. Brabham	1h 17m 16s
2	Jack Murray	30	Bug Ford	J. E. Murray	
3	Jack Robinson	20	Jaguar XK120 Special	J. H. Robinson	

Note: The Grand Prix title was awarded to Jack Brabham who had set the fastest race time.

== Notes ==
- Official attendance: 7,000
- Race distance: 28 laps, 100 miles (161 km)
- Starters: 24
- Finishers: Unknown
- Scratch starter: Jack Brabham
- Race winner's race time: 1 h 20 min 3 s, (approximately 78 mph, 125 km/h)
