= Gnoo Blas Motor Racing Circuit =

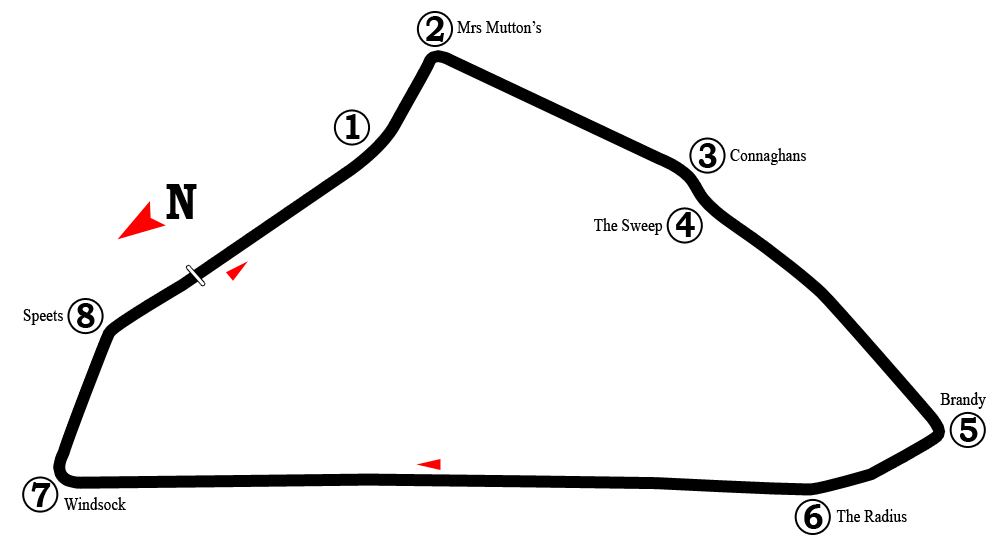
- Full Circuit (1953–1961)
- Location: Orange, New South Wales
- Coordinates: 33°19′1″S 149°5′39″E
- Opened: 24 January 1953; 73 years ago
- Closed: 22 October 1961; 64 years ago
- Major events: Australian Touring Car Championship (1960); Australian Drivers' Championship (1958–1959)

Full Circuit (1953–1961)
- Length: 6.03 km (3.75 mi)
- Turns: 8
- Race lap record: 2:07.4 (Jon Leighton, Cooper-Coventry Climax, 1960, Formula Libre)

The Gnoo Blas Motor Racing Circuit was a motor racing circuit at Orange, New South Wales, Australia. The circuit was formed from rural roads and highways outside the town, around the grounds of Bloomfield Hospital and what is now known as Sir Jack Brabham Park. It was 6.03 km (3.75 mi) long. The name came from the Aboriginal name for nearby Mount Canobolas.

The first race meeting was staged over the Anniversary Day holiday weekend of 24 to 26 January 1953 and was organized by the Australian Sporting Car Club, the former promoters of the Easter car races at the Mount Panorama Circuit, Bathurst. The January 1955 meeting, which featured the 1955 South Pacific Championship for racing cars, was the first FIA sanctioned international race meeting to be staged in Australia. The circuit played a crucial part in the growth of Australian open wheel racing in the post war era but faded before the peak created by the Tasman Series.

Gnoo Blas hosted the inaugural Australian Touring Car Championship event in 1960, the race being won by David McKay driving a Jaguar Mark 1 3.4-litre. Also competing were Bill Pitt (2nd), Ron Hodgson (3rd), Bruce McPhee, Des West, Ian Geoghegan and Brian Foley.

Continuing battles with New South Wales Police Force who authorised motor racing through the Speedway Act eventually forced the track's closure, with the last race meeting being held on 22 October 1961.

The locally based Gnoo Blas Classic Car Club hold an annual classic car show at the site.

== Results of major races ==
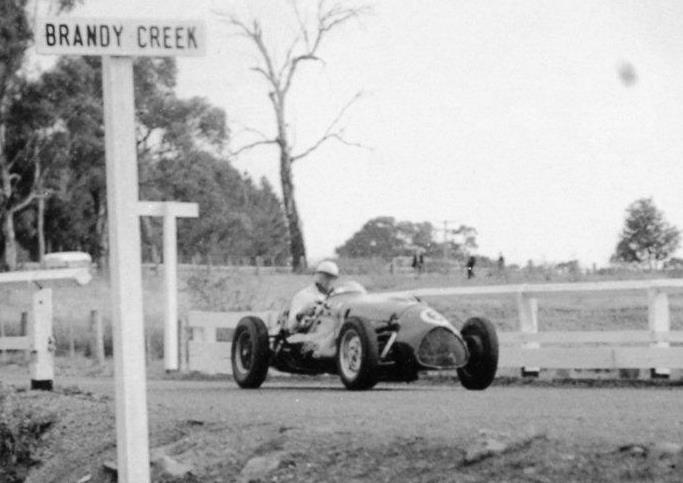
Jack Brabham (Cooper Bristol) competing at the Gnoo Blas Motor Racing Circuit.

Year	Race	Winning driver	Car
1953	New South Wales Grand Prix	Jack Brabham	Cooper Type 23 Bristol
1955	South Pacific Championship for racing cars	Peter Whitehead	Ferrari 500
1956	South Pacific Championship for racing cars	Reg Hunt	Maserati 250F
1958	South Pacific Championship for racing cars	Jack Brabham	Cooper T43 Coventry Climax
1959	South Pacific Championship for racing cars	Jack Brabham	Cooper T45 Coventry Climax
1960	Australian Touring Car Championship	David McKay	Jaguar 3.4 Litre

== Gallery ==
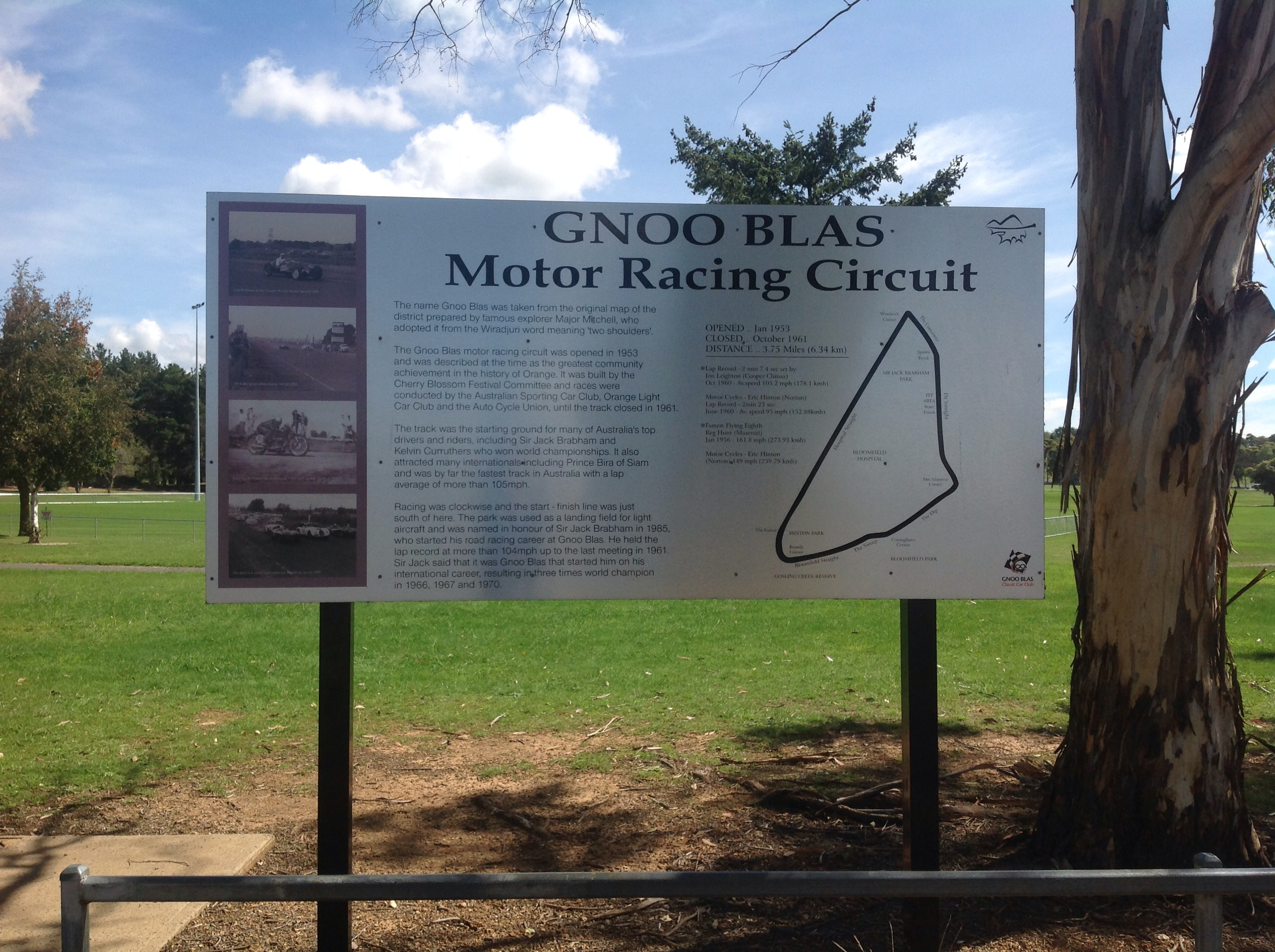
A sign commemorating the Gnoo Blas circuit at its former location.

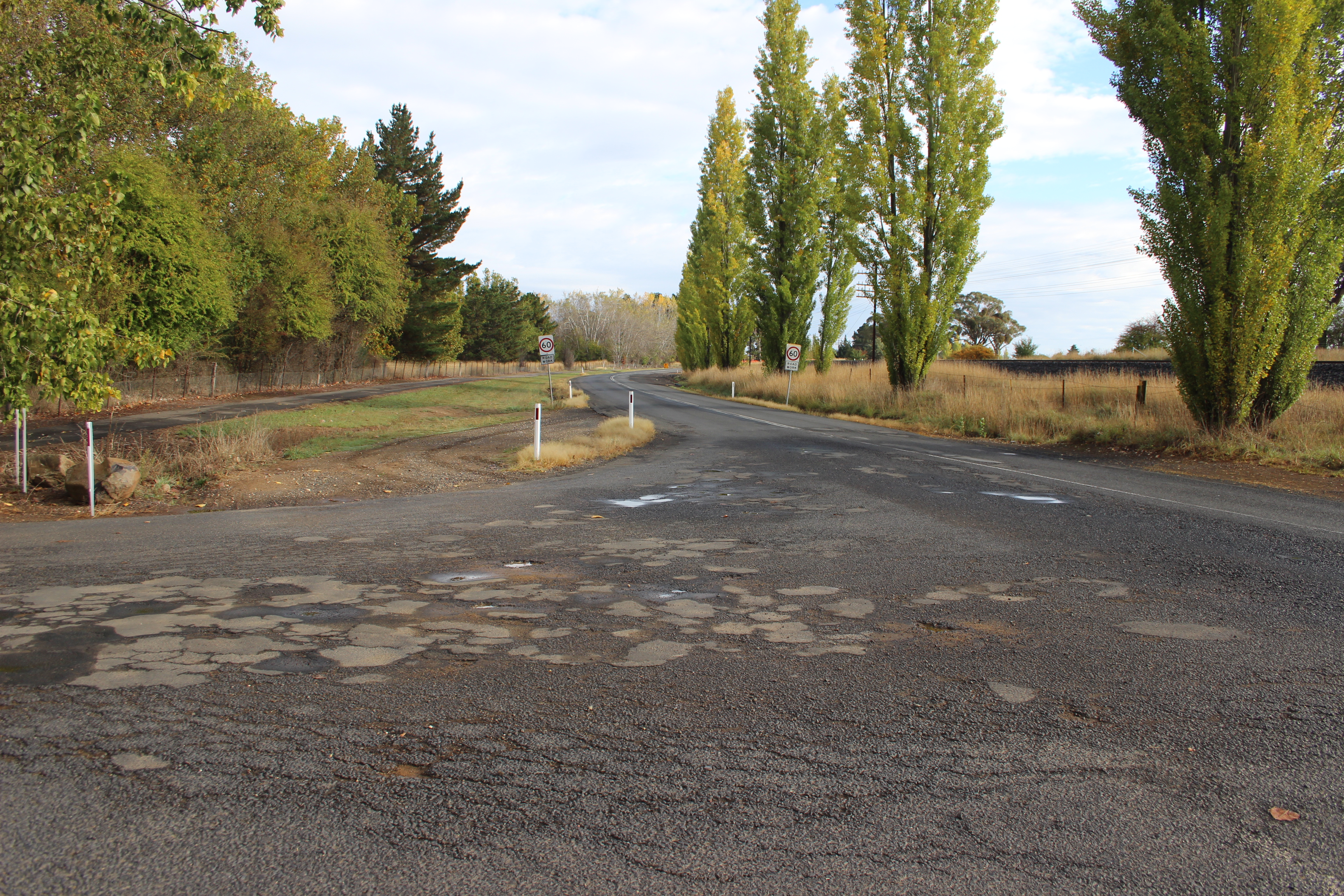
The run into Mrs Mutton's Corner.

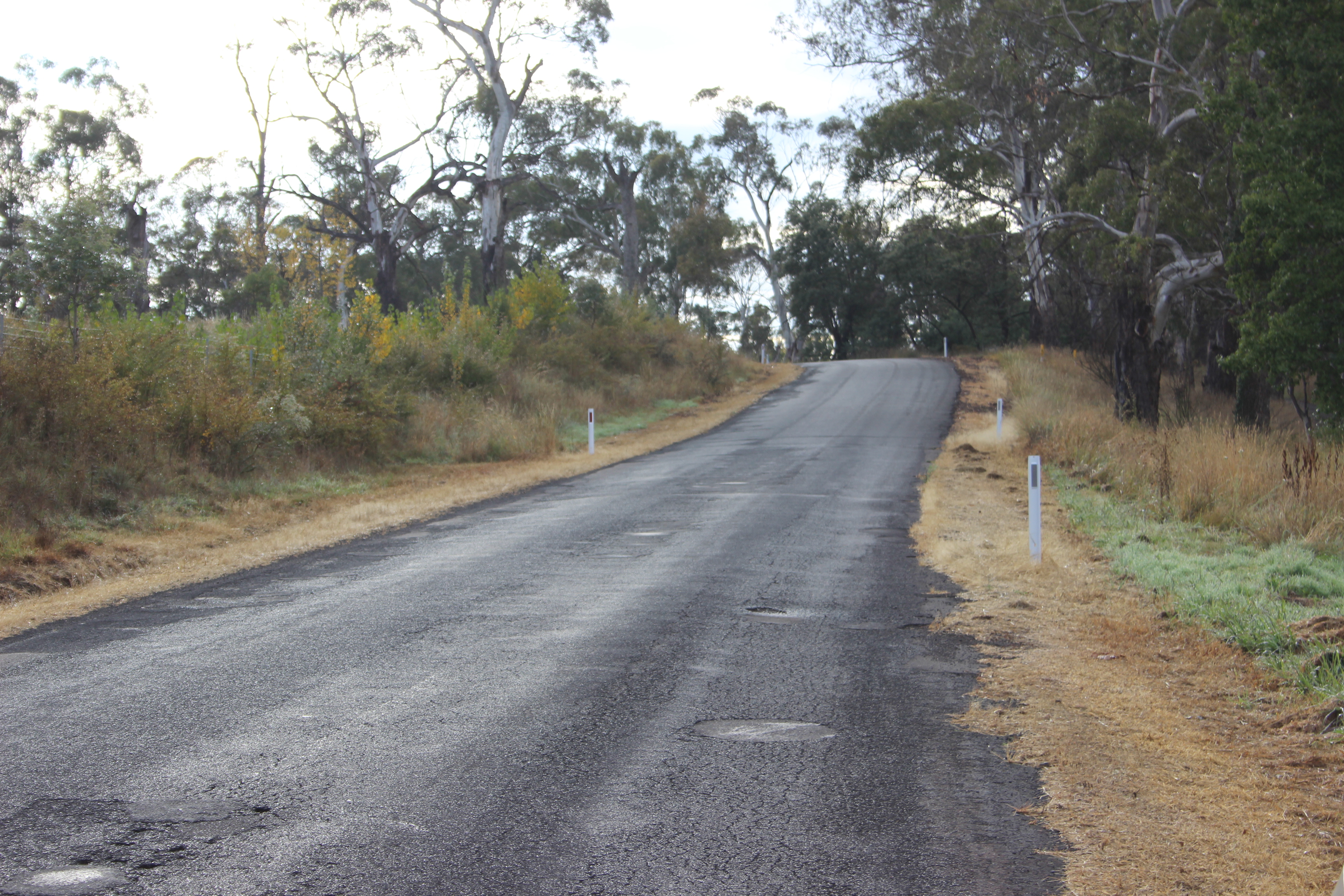
Looking back towards Connaghan's Corner from The Sweep.

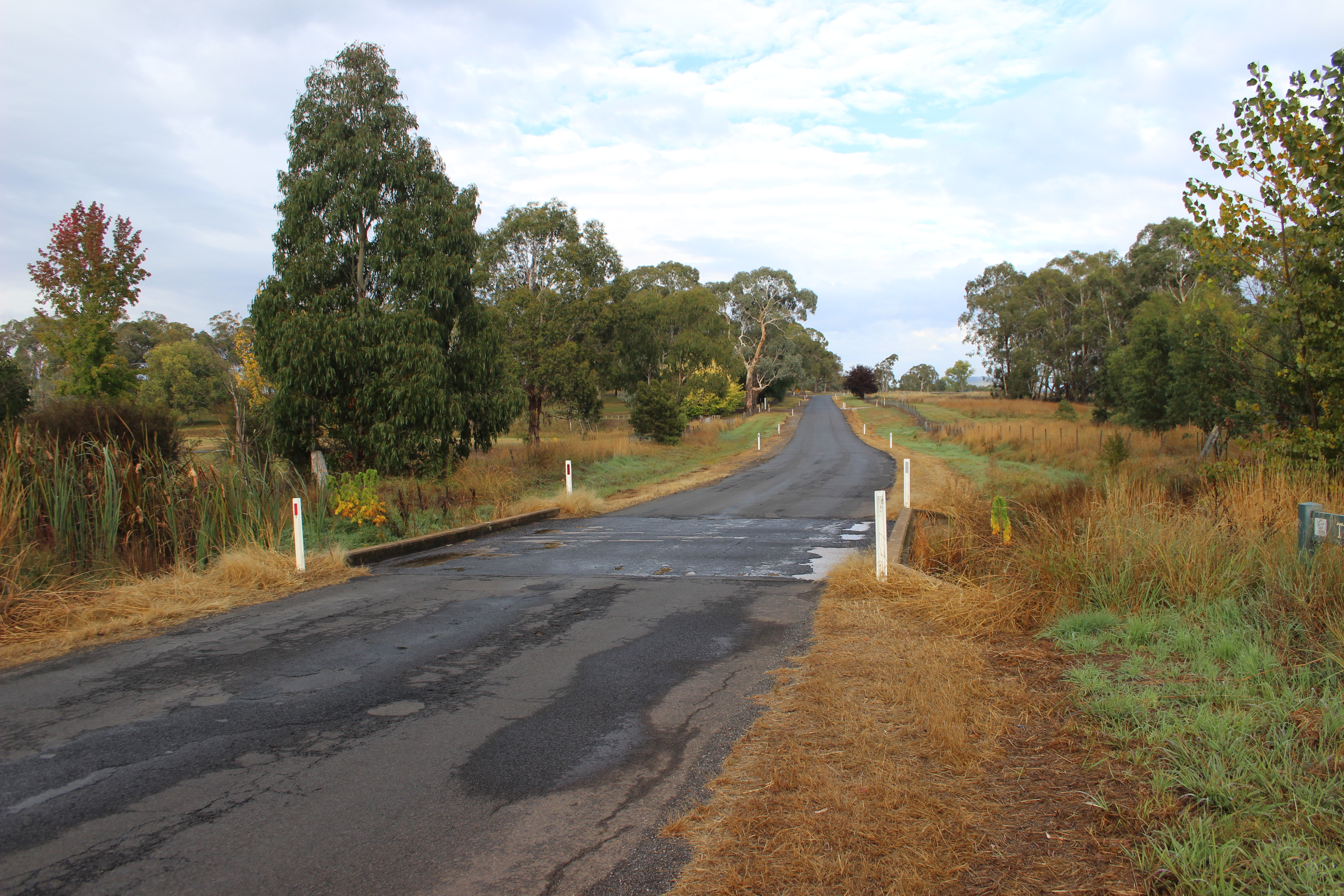
Looking down Bloomfield Straight from The Sweep.

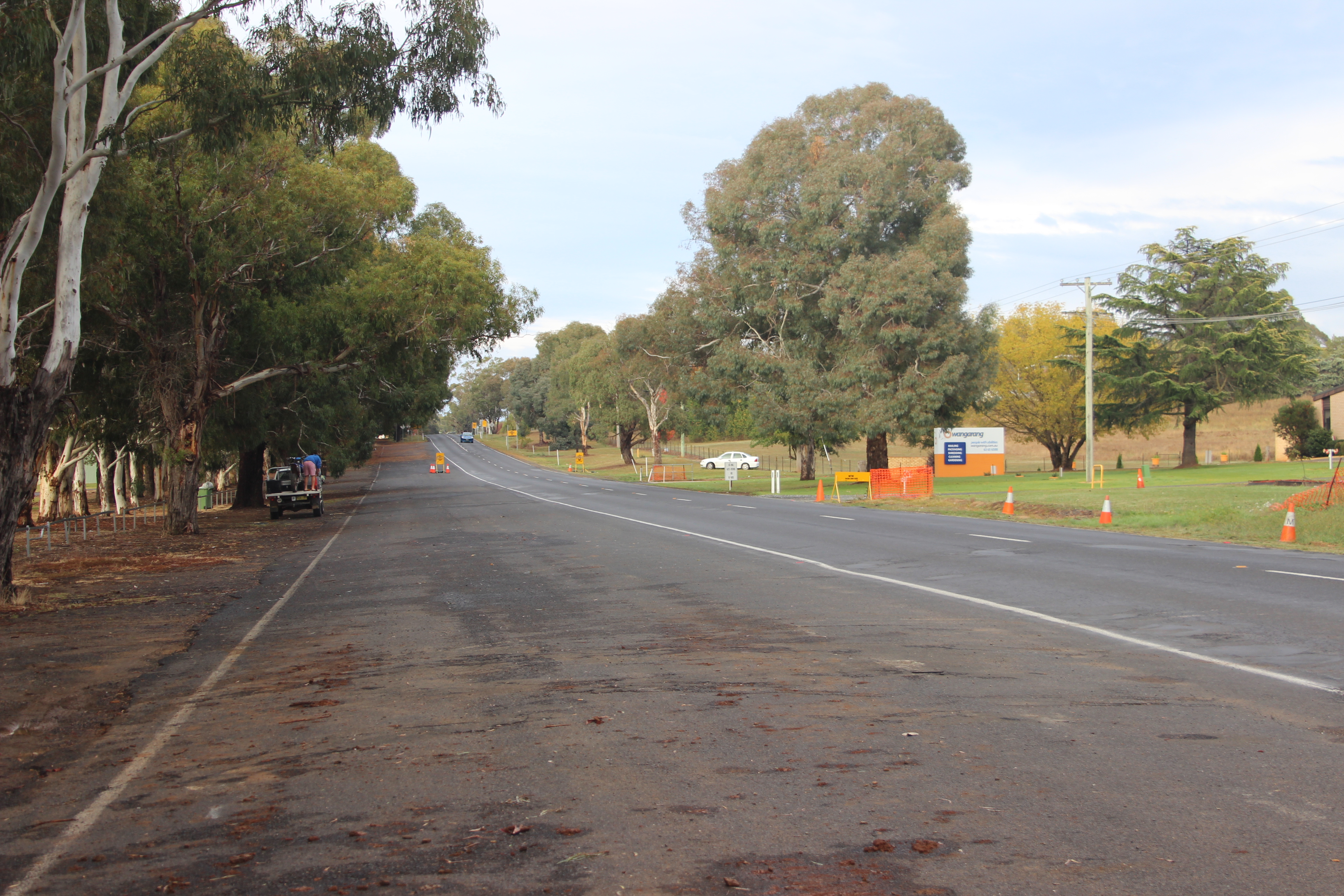
Looking back up Hospital Straight from Windsock Corner.

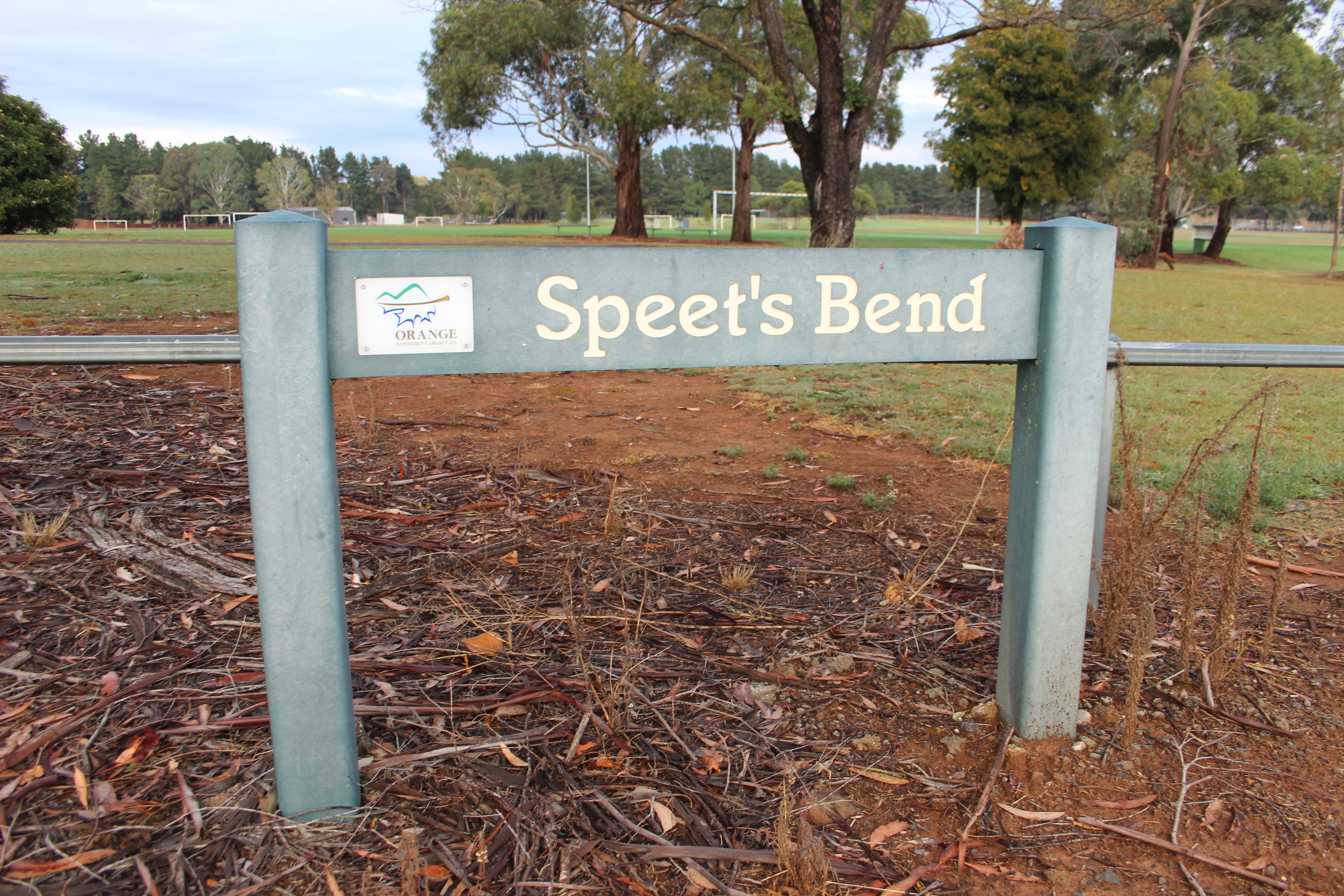
A sign marking the location of Speet's Bend. Many signs similar to this appear at various locations around the former circuit.
