= 1956 South Pacific Championship for Racing Cars =

The 1956 South Pacific Championship for Racing Cars was a motor race staged at the Gnoo Blas Motor Racing Circuit, near Orange in New South Wales, Australia, on Monday, 30 January 1956. The race was contested over 27 laps, a total distance of 100 miles. It was the feature race at the South Pacific Road Racing Championships meeting, which was organised by the Australian Sporting Car Club in conjunction with the Orange Cherry Blossom Car Racing Committee.

The race was won by Reg Hunt driving a Maserati 250F.

== Results ==
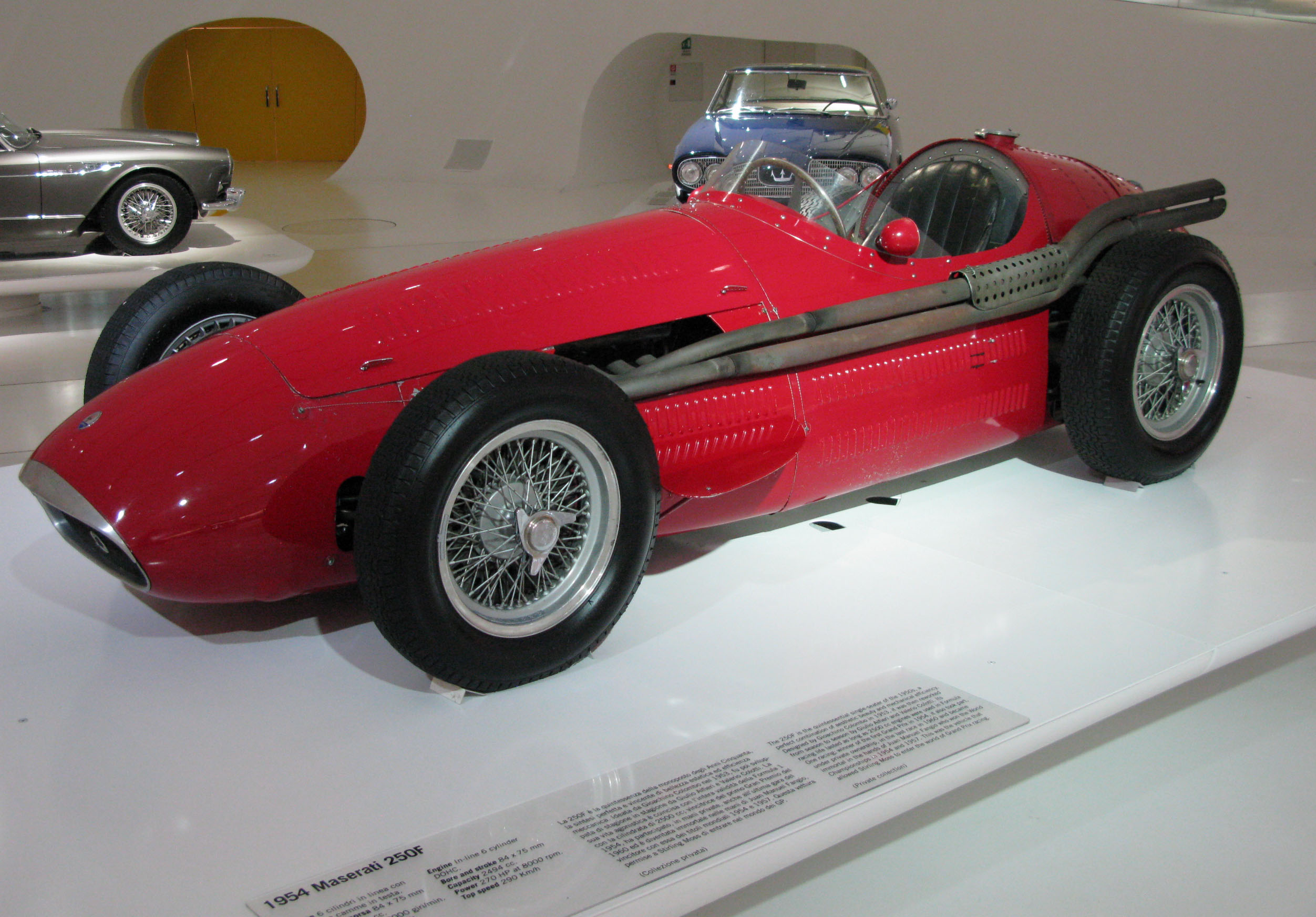
Reg Hunt won the race driving a Maserati 250F, similar to the example pictured above

Position	Driver	No.	Car	Entrant	Race time / Remarks	Laps
1	Reg Hunt	25	Maserati 250F	RH Hunt	1h 02m 45s	27
2	Jack Brabham		Cooper T40 Bristol	J Brabham	1h 06m 44s	27
3	Kevin Neal		Cooper T23 Bristol	K Neal	1h 07m 53s	27
4	Curley Brydon	4	Ferrari 166	R Cobden	1h 09m 37s	27
5	Col James		MG Special	Barclay Motors	1h 12m 30s	27
6	Noel Barnes		MG TC Special	N Barnes	1h 19m 36s	27
7	Jim Johnson		MG TC	J Johnson	1h 23m 18s	27
DNF	Stan Jones	6	Maybach 3			22
DNF	Holt Binnie; Frank Dent		MG TD Special	H Binnie		?
DNF	Jack Neal		Jaguar Special			11
DNF	Les Wheeler	11	Stewart MG			9
Disq	Jack Robinson		Jaguar XK120 Special		Outside assistance	
DNS	Reg Hunt		Maserati A6GCM/250F		Drove Maserati 250F	-
DNS	Alf Harvey	2	Maserati 4CLT-48 OSCA		Gearbox	-
DNS	Frank Kleinig		Porsche Spyder	N Hamilton	"Political reasons"	-

=== Notes ===
- Race distance: 27 laps, 100 miles
- Starters: 12
- Winner's average speed: 97 mph (155 km/h)
- Fastest lap: Reg Hunt, 2m 16s, 99.5 mph (lap record)
