= 1955 South Pacific Championship for racing cars =

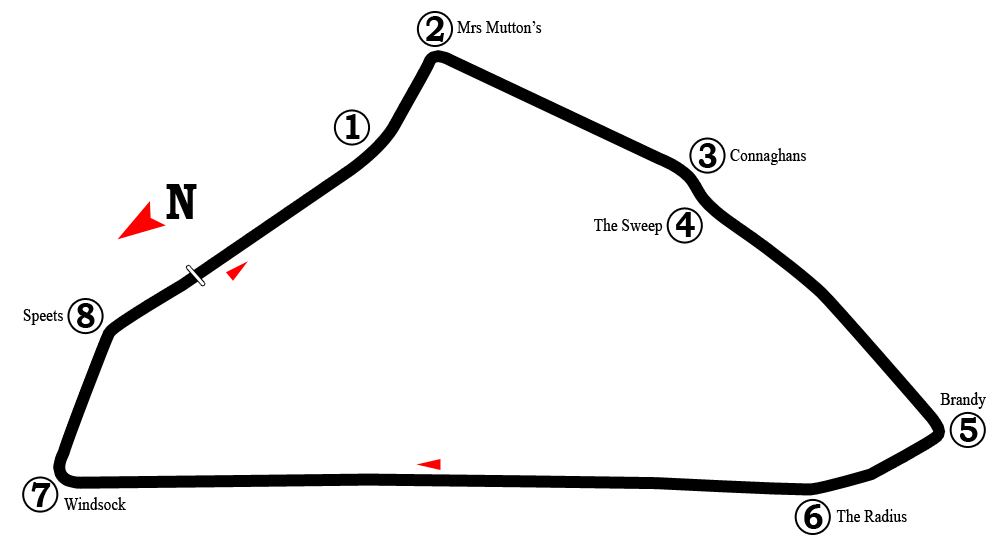
Track map of the Gnoo Blas Motor Racing Circuit (1953-1961)

The 1955 South Pacific Championship for racing cars was a motor race staged at the Gnoo Blas Motor Racing Circuit at Orange in New South Wales, Australia on 31 January 1955. The race, which was a Formula Libre event open to racing cars and stripped sports cars, was contested as a scratch race which also incorporated a handicap award. It was held over 27 laps of the 3¾ mile circuit for a total distance of 100 miles. The race, which was the first South Pacific Championship for racing cars, was won by Englishman Peter Whitehead driving a 3 litre Ferrari.

The championship meeting, which was conducted by the Australian Sporting Car Club, was the first FIA sanctioned international race meeting to be staged in Australia.

== Race results ==
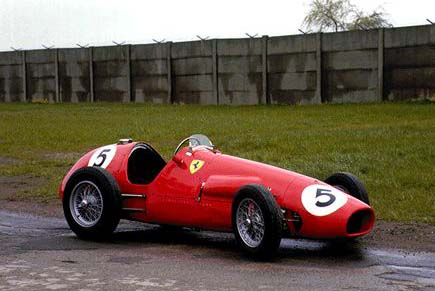
Peter Whitehead won the championship driving a Ferrari 500, similar to that pictured above.

Position	Driver	No.	Car	Laps	Remarks
1	Peter Whitehead	2	Ferrari 500	27	1h 5m 1s, 93 m.p.h.
2	Jack Brabham	5	Cooper Bristol		
3	Tony Gaze	4	Ferrari 500		
4	Jack Murray	56	Allard Cadillac		
5	Tom Sulman	14	Maserati		
6	Curly Brydon		MG TC Special		
7	G Grieg		Alfa Romeo Alvis		
?	John MacMillan	10	Alfa Romeo		
?	Noel Barnes		MG Special		
DNF	Jack Robinson		Jaguar XK120 Special	23	
DNF	Dick Cobden		Ferrari	2	
DNS	Prince Bira		Maserati		Engine failure in practice
DNS	Prince Bira		O.S.C.A.		Fuel feed problems in preliminary race
DNS	Reg Hunt		Maserati		Brakes
DNS	Ian Mountain		Peugeot Special		Fatal accident in preliminary race

=== Handicap results ===
Position	Driver	No.	Car	Laps
1	Jack Brabham	5	Cooper Bristol	
2	Jack Murray	56	Allard Cadillac	
3	Tom Sulman		Maserati	
4	Peter Whitehead	2	Ferrari 500	27

Notes:

- Attendance: 30,000
- Number of starters: unknown
- Number of finishers: unknown
- Winner's race time: 65 minutes 1 second
- Winner's average speed: 95 mph
- Fastest lap: Peter Whitehead, Ferrari 500, 2 minutes 21 seconds
