= 1960 Australian Touring Car Championship =

Motor racing competition

Seasons
- ← none 1961 →

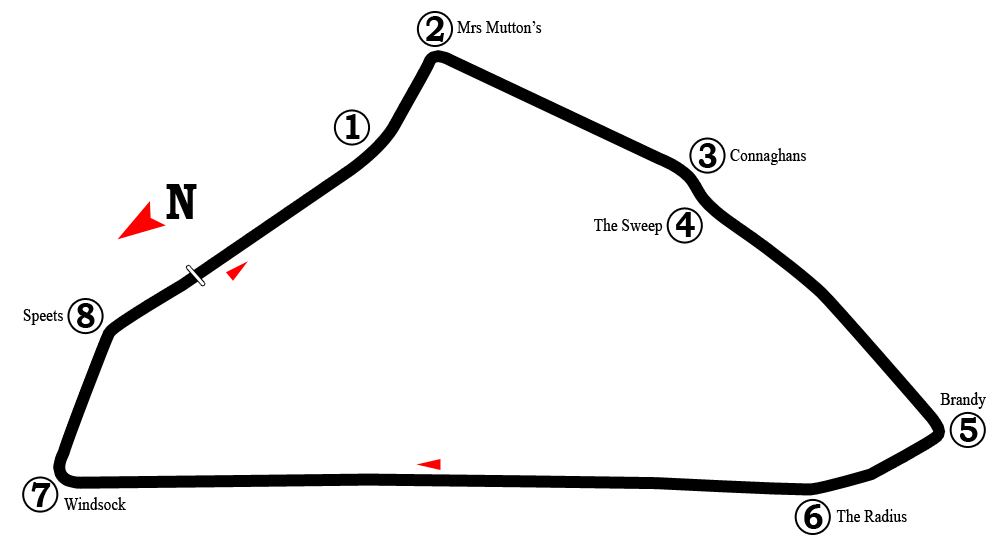
Track map of the Gnoo Blas Motor Racing Circuit (1953–1961)

The 1960 Australian Touring Car Championship was a CAMS sanctioned motor racing title for drivers of Appendix J Touring Cars. The title, which was the inaugural Australian Touring Car Championship, was contested over a single 20 lap, 75 mile race held on 1 February 1960 at the Gnoo Blas Motor Racing Circuit near Orange in New South Wales. The race was the first to be run under Appendix J Touring Car regulations, ushering in a new era that would last until January 1965 when CAMS replaced Appendix J with Group C for Improved Production Touring Cars.

The championship was won by David McKay driving a Jaguar Mark 1 3.4 Litre.

== Race ==
This, the first Australian touring car race to be run under a set of national regulations which defined a level of modification, was dominated by the three Jaguar Mark 1 drivers. The journalist racer David McKay, remembered for his efforts promoting racing cars and sports cars with his Scuderia Veloce team, claimed the racing achievement he is best remembered for, in a touring car race.

A single day of practice was held on Sunday, 31 January, with the fastest lap times from official practice used to set the grid for the race the following day. McKay set the fastest lap time of 2:40 to take pole position, with Bill Pitt and Ron Hodgson, also in Jaguars, setting times of 2:41 and 2:42 respectively to line up second and third on the grid. Later in the day, Hodgson set a lap time of 2:39 in unofficial practice. Multiple cars, including the three Jaguars, suffered overheating problems during the day, while Hodgson also had gearbox troubles with the car jumping out of gear. Roy Sawyer blew an engine which was rebuilt overnight.

Hodgson led away from the start, getting the jump on McKay and Pitt, with the three Jaguars quickly pulling away from the rest of the field. All three drivers missed their brake markers going into Windsock Corner on lap 1, with Hodgson running wide and McKay and Pitt both spinning. This gave Hodgson a lead heading into lap 2 but McKay caught him halfway through the lap. Hodgson again left his braking too late at Windsock, allowing McKay, Pitt and several other cars through. By the time Hodgson restarted his car, he was around one minute down on McKay and Pitt. Hodgson was able to regain third place within the next lap, leaving Max Volkers in fourth while Ian Geoghegan led a battle for fifth until blowing a head gasket.

By lap 14, McKay had a lead of 26 seconds over Pitt, while rain was beginning to fall over the circuit. Sawyer spun his car coming over the crest at Connaghans Corner, hitting the inside bank and rolling. Jack van Schaik narrowly missed Sawyer's car while Ken Miller scraped his roof on one of Sawyer's bumpers. Des West stopped to help Sawyer escape the car while the driver of a Ford Zephyr had also stopped, their car blocking the track. After helping Sawyer, West burned his hands while restarting his own car. McKay was able to slow safely as he approached the scene but was forced to use his car to move the stationary Zephyr out of the way. This allowed Pitt to close the gap and he took the lead when McKay spun on the following lap. However, the overdrive mechanism in Pitt's car began to fail and McKay was able to retake the lead with two laps remaining. McKay led to the finish, six seconds ahead of Pitt, with Hodgson more than a minute behind. Volkers was the best of the rest, finishing one lap down in fourth place.

== Results ==
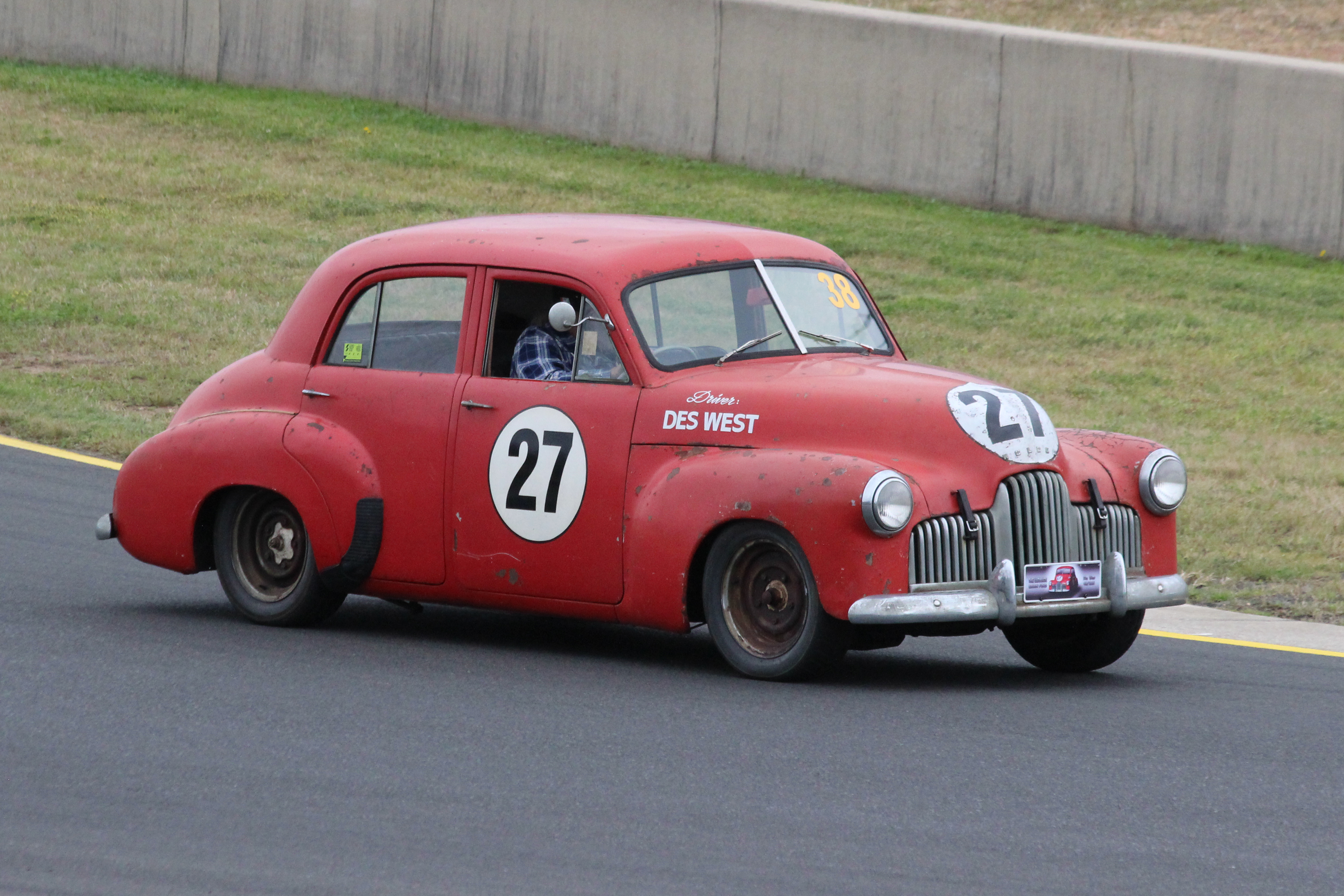
The Holden 48-215 of Des West, pictured in 2015. The car was blue when it contested the race, being painted red later in the year.

Position	Driver	No.	Car	Entrant	Class	Class Pos.	Laps	Time / Remarks
1	David McKay	71	Jaguar 3.4 Litre Mark 1	D. McKay			20	54m 19s
2	Bill Pitt	34	Jaguar 3.4 Litre Mark 1	Mrs. Anderson			20	54m 25s
3	Ron Hodgson	69	Jaguar 3.4 Litre Mark 1	Strathfield Motors			20	55m 42s
4	Max Volkers	4	Holden FJ	M. Volkers	2001cc to 2600cc	1	19	
5	Jan Harris	72	Holden	J. Harris	2001cc to 2600cc	2	?	
6	Ralph Sach	15	Holden 48/215	T. Sulman	2001cc to 2600cc	3	?	
7	Ken Miller	17	Holden	K. E. Miller	2001cc to 2600cc	4	?	
8	John Millard	36	Holden	J. R. Millard	2001cc to 2600cc	5	?	
9	Bruce McPhee	33	Holden 48/215	B. A. McPhee	2001cc to 2600cc	6	?	
10	Andy Selmes	41	Holden 48/215	A.W. Selmes	2001cc to 2600cc	7	?	
11	Des West	27	Holden 48/215	D. L. West	2001cc to 2600cc	8	?	
12	Jerry Trevor-Jones	55	Austin Lancer	R. Bland	1301cc to 2000cc	1	?	
13	J. Ayley	8	Holden	J. R. Ayley	2001cc to 2600cc	9	?	
14	R. Young	51	Holden	R. Young	2001cc to 2600cc	10	?	
15	Ian Grant	37	Holden	Momchong Motors	2001cc to 2600cc	11	?	
16	Charles Van Schaik	46	Morris Major	C. Van Schaik	1301cc to 2000cc	2	?	
17	R. Smith	45	Ford Zephyr	R. B. Smith	2001cc to 2600cc	12	?	
18	W. Wallace	6	Holden	W. Wallace	2001cc to 2600cc	13	?	
19	John Malcolm	35	Austin Lancer	J. R. Malcolm	1301cc to 2000cc	3	?	
20	Denis Gregory	20	Morris Major	D. Gregory	1301cc to 2000cc	4	?	
21	Brian Foley	11	Austin A40 Farina	Kinsley Pty Ltd	Under 1000cc	1	?	
22	Jack Van Schaik	47	Simca	J. Van Schaik	1001cc to 1300cc	1	?	
23	Ken Brigden	63	Peugeot 203	K. A. Brigden	1001cc to 1300cc	2	?	
24	Emmanual Pitsiladis	38	Austin Lancer	E. D. Piltsiladis	1301cc to 2000cc	5	?	
25	Eric Creese	96	Simca	E. Creese	1001cc to 1300cc	3	?	
26	Malcolm Bailey	89	Wolseley 1500	M. S . Bailey	1301cc to 2000cc	6	?	
27	Kevin Bartlett	144	Morris Minor 1000	K. Bartlett	Under 1000cc	2	?	
28	Dick Martin	66	Morris Minor	R. Martin	Under 1000cc	3	?	
29	Keith Watts	29	Peugeot	K. Watts	1301cc to 2000cc	7	?	
30	R. Copley	48	Morris Minor	R. Copley	Under 1000cc	4	?	
31	Ted Ansell	40	NSU Prinz	E. Ansell	Under 1000cc	5	?	
DNF	Roy Sawyer	7	Holden FJ	R.A. Sawyer	2001cc to 2600cc	-	?	Accident
DNF	Ian Geoghegan	5	Holden 48/215	I. Geoghegan	2001cc to 2600cc	-	?	Head gasket
DNF	Howard Sketchley	44	Austin Lancer	H. Sketchley	1301cc to 2000cc	-	?	
DNF	Charlie Smith	14	Morris Major	C. G. Smith	1301cc to 2000cc	-	?	
DNF	Bob Rawlings	22	Holden	R. K. Rawlings	2001cc to 2600cc	-	?	Rollover
DNF	Doug Kelly	23	Fiat Abarth 750	Bank Corner Motors	Under 1000cc	-	?	
DNF	Alton Boddenberg	24	Peugeot 203	A. J . Boddenberg	1001cc to 1300cc	-	?	
DNF	Doug Stewart	50	Simca	J. A. Witter & Co	1001cc to 1300cc	-	?	
DNF	Ray Price	54	Fiat 1100	R. A. Price	1001cc to 1300cc	-	?	
DNF	John Halcrow	31	Holden	J. E. Halcrow	2001cc to 2600cc	-	?	
DNF	?	?	?	?	?	-	?	
DNF	?	?	?	?	?	-	?	
DNF	?	?	?	?	?	-	?	

== Statistics ==
- Pole position: David McKay, 2:40
- Fastest lap: David McKay, 2:35, 140 km/h (87 m.p.h.)
- Average speed of winning car: 133 km/h (80 m.p.h.)
- There were 44 starters of which 31 finished.
- Attendance: 7,000
