= David McKay (journalist) =

Australian journalist (1921–2004)

- Nationality: Australian
- Born: 14 May 1921 North Sydney, New South Wales
- Died: 26 December 2004 (aged 83)

Australian Drivers' Championship
- Years active: 1959–63
- Teams: Scuderia Veloce
- Best finish: 3rd in 1963

Championship titles
- 1960 1958: Australian Touring Car Champ. Australian Tourist Trophy

David McKay (14 May 1921 – 26 December 2004) was an Australian journalist and prominent motoring identity.

While most well known as a journalist, specifically as a motoring writer, McKay was also a prominent figure in motor racing as both a driver and a race team owner. That team, Scuderia Veloce, was the first Australian-based professional racing team, and in addition to furthering McKay's own racing career also furthered the careers of many young racing drivers including Spencer Martin, Brian Muir and Greg Cusack amongst others.

One of McKay's first forays into competitive motorsport was following the purchase of the ex-Dick Cobden MG TC, known as The Red Cigar. The single-seat, aluminum-bodied racer with Maserati style lines quickly propelled McKay to on track success finishing as the highest placed MG in the 1952 Australian Grand Prix at Bathurst along with solid wins and placings at events in Gnoo Blas, Nowra and Mount Druitt across the season of 1953.

In 1958, McKay won the Australian Tourist Trophy at Bathurst in an Aston Martin DB3S. Then in 1960 McKay achieved the most memorable victory in his career, winning the inaugural Australian Touring Car Championship at the Gnoo Blas circuit in Orange driving a Jaguar Mark 1. A post-race penalty which was later proven an incorrect judgement for a jump start meant McKay was cheated of victory when he won the 1961 Australian Grand Prix at Mallala in South Australia (he was placed 3rd due to the penalty), only 4 seconds behind Lex Davison and Bib Stillwell. McKay had the right to protest and have his name added to the list of Australian Grand Prix winners when it was found later that day that he had not committed a jump start after all. McKay's background was so deeply ingrained that the act of protesting was unthinkable. McKay drove a Cooper T51-Climax FPF in the Grand Prix.

Despite continuing to race various cars from open wheelers to sports cars and Production Touring Cars until his last race, the 1979 Hardie-Ferodo 1000 in a standard Volvo 242 GT with Spencer Martin where they finished 20th, McKay never again contested the ATCC as a driver following his win in 1960.

McKay was also responsible for the first ever factory backed Holden team in 1968 when he formed the Holden Dealer Racing Team. The team ran three brand new Holden Monaro GTS 327's in the 1968 Hardie-Ferodo 500 at Mount Panorama, Bathurst. Jim Palmer and Phil West finished 2nd outright behind the winning Monaro of Bruce McPhee and Barry Mulholland. Brian Muir and 1964 winner George Reynolds finished 5th while the Paul Hawkins / Bill Brown car was disqualified.

McKay also organised a separate team of Holden Monaros to contest the 1968 London-Sydney Marathon. The cars were prepared by Holden, entered under the "Sydney Telegraph" name, and sponsored by the Daily Telegraph, a Sydney newspaper for which McKay was a motoring writer. McKay himself drove the lead car with Sydney's Barry Ferguson the lead driver in the team's second car while three time Australian Grand Prix winner Doug Whiteford was drafted in to drive the third Monaro. McKay failed to finish, Ferguson finished 12th while Whiteford finished 14th.

McKay's career as a writer began in 1949 and he worked for the Sir Frank Packer owned newspapers The Daily Telegraph and The Sunday Telegraph from 1956 to 1975, first as a writer and later as the motoring editor. It was while working for Packer that McKay convinced him to co-sponsor the London-Sydney Marathon, as well as the Monaros McKay would run in the rally.

McKay died of cancer on 26 December 2004. He was 83.

== Career results ==
Season	Series	Position	Car	Entrant / team
1958	Australian Tourist Trophy	1st	Aston Martin DB3S	D. McKay
1959	Australian Drivers' Championship	10th	Cooper T51 Climax	Victa Pty Ltd
1960	Australian Touring Car Championship	1st	Jaguar Mark 1	D McKay
1961	Australian Drivers' Championship	8th	Cooper T51 Climax	Scuderia Veloce
1961	Australian GT Championship	2nd	Lola	Scuderia Veloce
1962	Australian Drivers' Championship	5th	Cooper T53 Climax	Scuderia Veloce
1963	Australian Drivers' Championship	3rd	Brabham BT4 Climax	Scuderia Veloce

=== Complete Phillip Island/Bathurst 500/1000 results ===
Year	Entrant / team	Co-drivers	Car	Class	Laps	Overall position	Class position
1960	Lanock Motors Ltd.	(Australia) Greg Cusack	Volkswagen Beetle	B	158	16th	6th
1961	(Australia) York Motors (Sales) Pty Ltd	(Australia) Brian Foley	Studebaker Lark	A	166	2nd	1st
1963	(Australia) Scuderia Veloce	(Australia) Brian Foley	Vauxhall Velox	D	20	DNF	DNF
1967	(Australia) Scuderia Veloce	(Australia) George Reynolds	Audi Super 90	D	122	16th	6th
1969	(Australia) Scuderia Veloce / Alto Ford	(Australia) Brian Foley	Ford XW Falcon GTHO	D	78	DNF	DNF
1970	(Australia) Finnie Ford Pty Ltd		Ford XW Falcon GTHO Phase II	E	23	DNF	DNF
1971	(Australia) Finnie Ford Pty Ltd		Ford XY Falcon GT-HO Phase III	E	129	3rd	3rd
1979	(Australia) Scuderia Veloce P/L	(Australia) Spencer Martin	Volvo 242 GT	B	129	20th	5th

Sporting positions
Preceded by inaugural	Winner of the Australian Touring Car Championship; 1960	Succeeded by Bill Pitt
Records
Preceded by established	Most ATCC round wins 1 (1960), 1st win at the 1960 Australian Touring Car Championship	Succeeded by Bob Jane; 2 wins (1962 – 1974)
