= Jaguar Mark 1 =

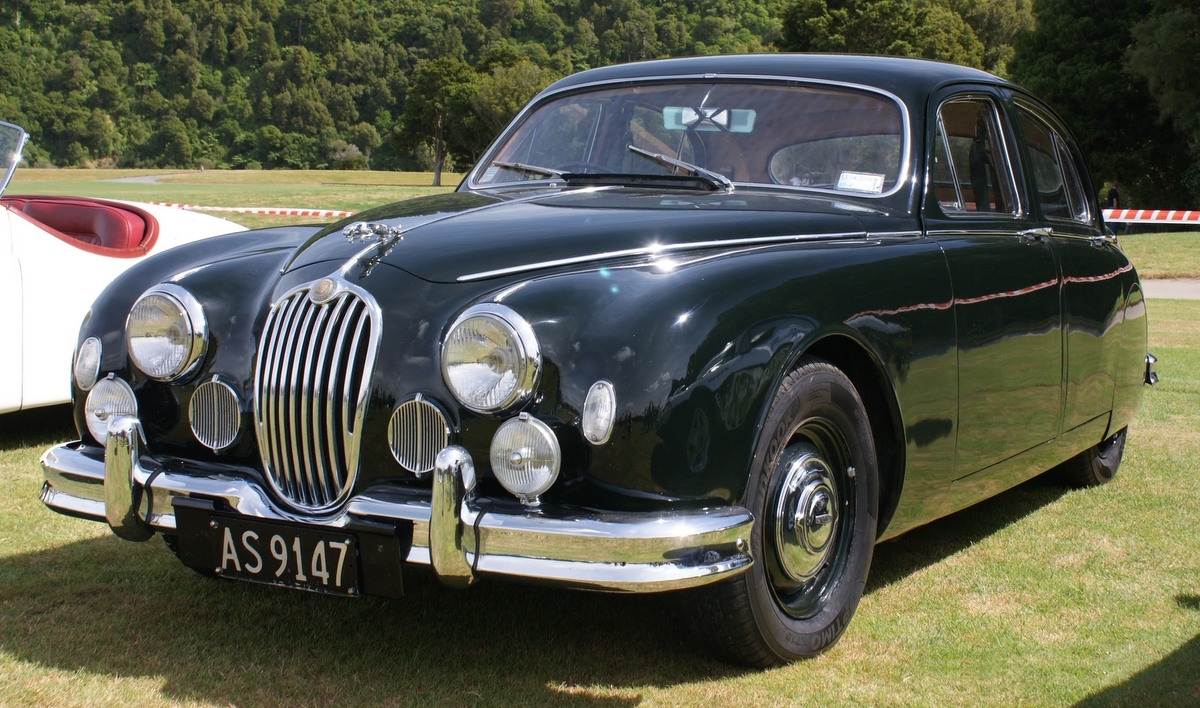
- Jaguar 2.4 Litre special equipment early 1957

Overview
- Manufacturer: Jaguar Cars
- Production: 1955–1959; 37,397 produced; 2.4 Litre: 19,992 produced; 3.4 Litre: 17,405 produced
- Assembly: Coventry, England
- Designer: William Lyons

Body and chassis
- Class: Mid-size luxury / Executive car (E)
- Body style: 4-door saloon

Powertrain
- Engine: 2,483 cc XK I6; 3,442 cc XK I6
- Transmission: 4-speed manual 4-speed manual + overdrive 3-speed automatic

Dimensions
- Wheelbase: 107.5 in (2,730 mm)
- Length: 181 in (4,597 mm)
- Width: 66.75 in (1,695 mm)
- Height: 57.25 in (1,454 mm)

Chronology
- Predecessor: Jaguar 2½ Litre saloon
- Successor: Jaguar Mark 2

The Jaguar Mark 1 is a British luxury saloon car produced by Jaguar between 1955 and 1959. It was referred to in contemporary company documentation as the Jaguar 2.4 Litre and Jaguar 3.4 Litre. Its designation as Mark 1 was retroactive, following its October 1959 replacement by Jaguar's 2.4-litre Mark 2. The 2.4 Litre was the company's first small saloon since the end of its 1½ and 2½ Litre cars in 1949, and was an immediate success, easily outselling the larger, much more expensive Jaguar saloons.

The 2.4 Litre saloon was announced on 28 September 1955. The 3.4 Litre saloon announced 17 months later in the U.S. on 26 February 1957 was designed for the American market and was not at first freely available on the domestic market.

== History ==
In 1951 Jaguar relocated to Daimler's Browns Lane plant which provided not merely sufficient production capacity for their existing range, but enabled them to move into the middle-weight executive saloon sector, then occupied in the UK by cars such as the stately Humbers, the bulbous Standard Vanguard and the heavy Rover P4. Jaguar's new 2.4 and 3.4 introduced a modern style and a new level of performance to this respectable company.

Although having a family resemblance to the larger Mark VII, the Mark I differed in many ways. It was the first Jaguar with unitary construction of body and chassis. The independent front suspension featured double wishbones, coil springs, telescopic dampers, and an anti-roll bar, all carried in a separate subframe mounted to the body by rubber bushes (with only minor revisions, this system was used on subsequent Jaguar saloons including early versions of the XJ). The live rear axle used a simplified version of the D-Type suspension, with inverted semi-elliptic springs cantilevered into the main body frame with the rear quarter section carrying the axle and acting as trailing arms. Transverse location was secured by a Panhard rod, the system being a significant improvement over other contemporary Jaguar saloons and sports cars (the reason for the unusual inverted leaf spring arrangement was the same as for the D-Type: to transfer all rear axle loads forward to the unitary body shell. The rear of the car was unstressed). The rear wheel track was some 4.5 in (114 mm) narrower than the front track and looked peculiar from behind, a feature that was blamed (probably incorrectly) for excessive understeer at low speed. It was reported to be better balanced at higher speeds - indeed, the narrower track was deemed to assist high speed straight-line stability and was a feature incorporated in many record-breaking cars of pre and post-War design. Nevertheless, it is probable that the narrower rear track was occasioned by the lack of a suitably dimensioned component from Salisbury, the axle manufacturer.

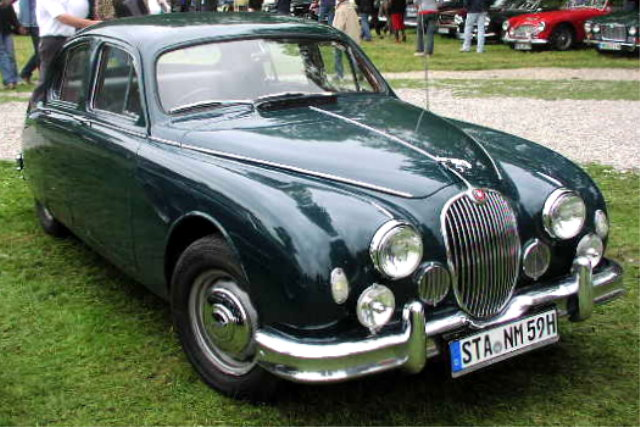
2.4 Litre with new grille introduced 1957

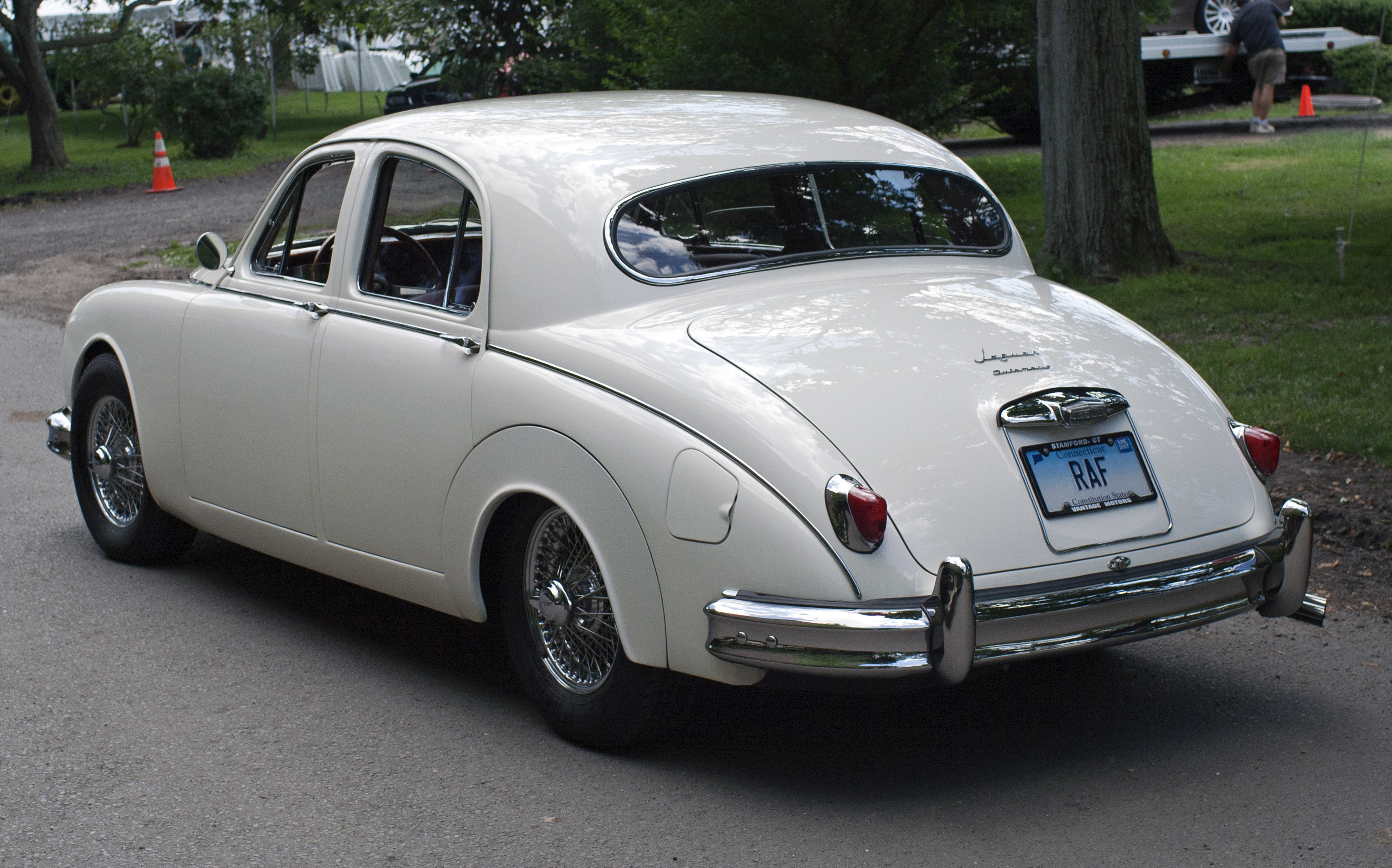
1957 3.4 Litre automatic

The interior was of similar design to the contemporary Jaguar saloons and sports cars, with most of the dials and switches being located on the central dashboard between the driver and passenger. This arrangement reduced the differences between LHD and RHD versions.

Although its profile was very different from that of previous Jaguars, the side window surrounds and opening rear "no draught ventilator" (quarterlight) windows are reminiscent of Jaguar Mark IV saloons.

At launch the car had 11.125 in (283 mm) drum brakes but from the end of 1957 got the innovative (at the time) option of disc brakes on all four wheels.

The car was available in standard or special equipment versions with the former lacking a tachometer, heater (available as an option), windscreen washers, fog lights and cigarette lighter. Both versions did however have leather upholstery and polished walnut trim.

== 3.4-litre engine ==
The Mark 1 was initially offered with a 2.4 litre short-stroke version of the XK120's twin-cam six-cylinder engine, first rated at 112bhp net by the factory at the launch in 1955. From February 1957 the larger and heavier 3.4 litre 210bhp (gross) unit already used in the Jaguar Mark VIII also became available, largely in response to pressure from US Jaguar dealers. Wire wheels became available. The 3.4 had a larger front grille for better cooling, a stronger rear axle and rear-wheel covers (spats) were cut away to accommodate the wire wheels' knock-off hubcaps. The 2.4 Litre was also given the larger grille. After 200 cars had been built and sent to USA and just prior to the car's announcement, a major factory fire destroyed 3.4 Litre production facilities. See also Jaguar XKSS.

In September 1957 a three-speed Borg-Warner automatic transmission (previously an export-only option) became available with either engine, and Dunlop disc brakes for all four wheels were made available as an optional extra on all Jaguar models except the Mark VIII saloon. 19,992 of the 2.4 and 17,405 of the 3.4 Litre versions were made.

== Performance ==
A 2.4 Litre saloon with overdrive was tested by the British magazine The Motor in 1956. It was found to have a top speed of 101.5 mph (163.3 km/h) and could accelerate from 0–60 mph (97 km/h) in 14.4 seconds. A fuel consumption of 18.25 miles per imperial gallon (15.48 L/100 km; 15.20 mpg_{‑US}) was recorded. The test car cost £1532 including taxes.

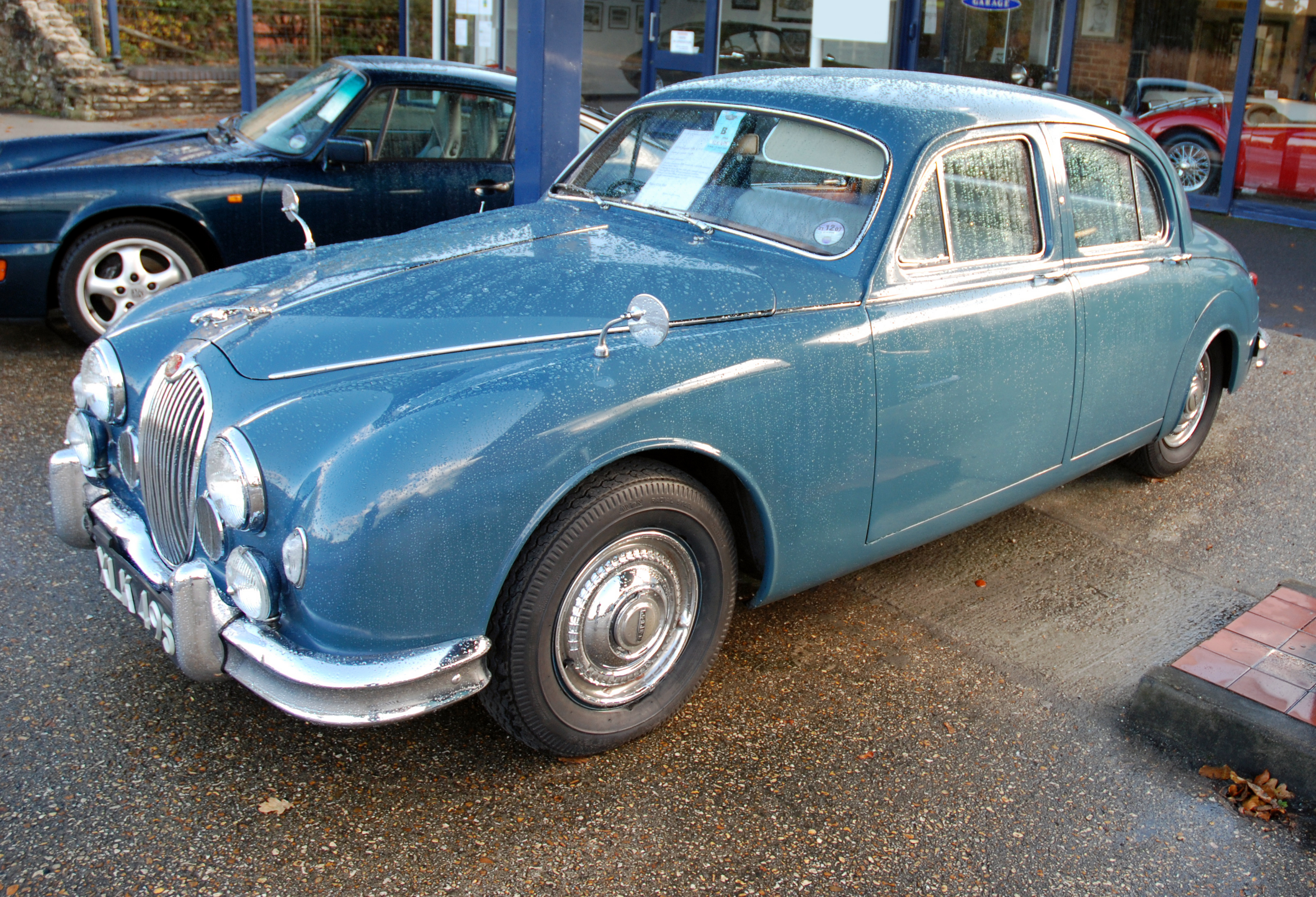
Very late (1959) Jaguar 3.4 Litre

They went on to test a 3.4 Litre automatic saloon in 1957. This car had a top speed of 119.8 mph (192.8 km/h), acceleration from 0-60 mph (97 km/h) in 11.2 seconds and a fuel consumption of 21.1 miles per imperial gallon (13.4 L/100 km; 17.6 mpg_{‑US}) was recorded. The test car cost £1864 including taxes of £622.

A manual overdrive version of the 3.4 Litre was tested by The Autocar in June 1958. Its 0–60 mph (97 km/h) time was 9.1 seconds, and 0–100 mph (160 km/h) in 26 seconds, little more than a second behind the contemporary XK150 with the same engine.

== Racing ==
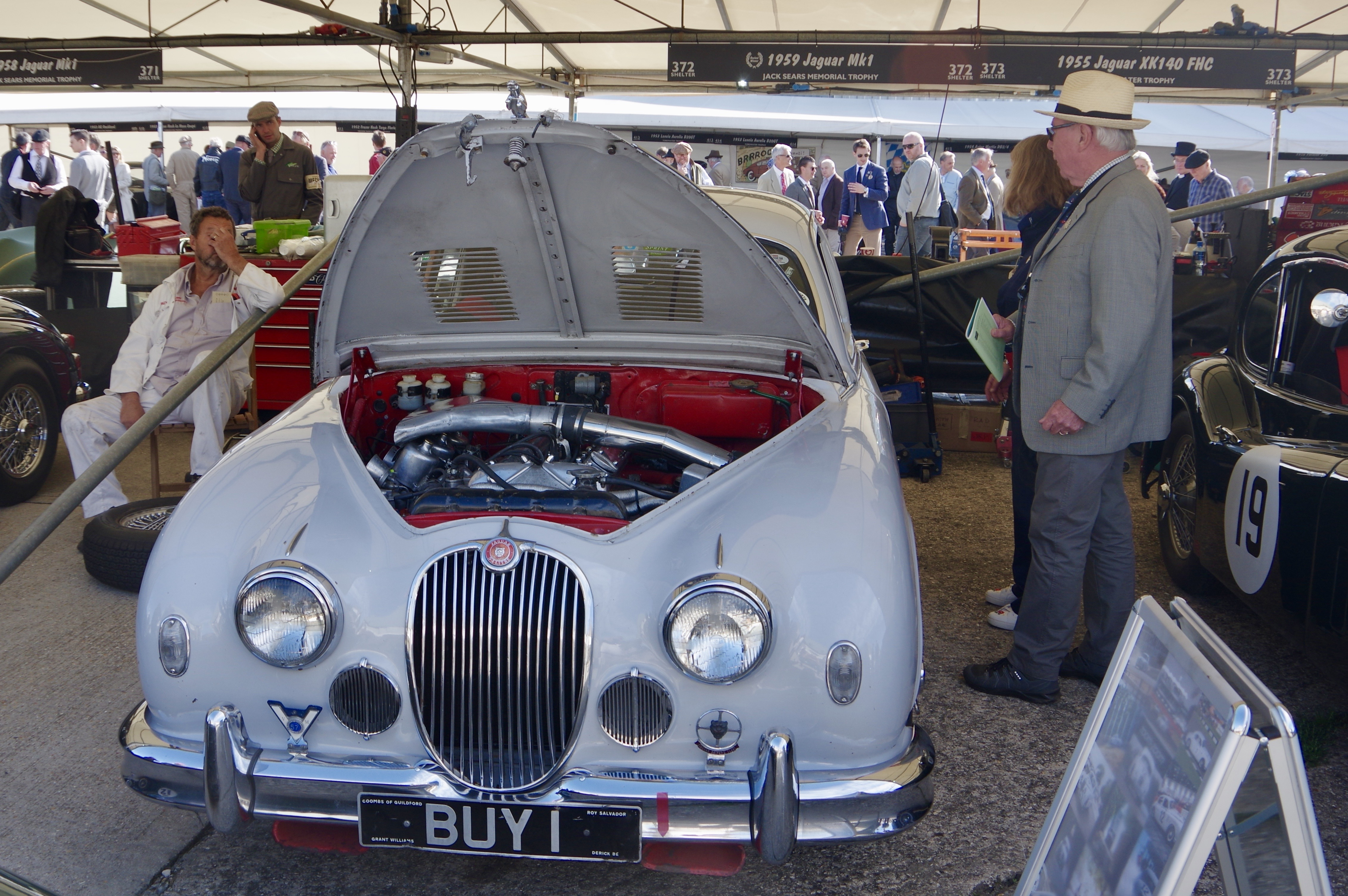
The Jaguar Mark I campaigned extensively by Roy Salvadori in the 1959 British Saloon Car Championship under the ownership of John Coombs (Coombs of Guildford), sporting his famous 'BUY 1' registration plate.

Mark I 3.4 Litre saloons competed successfully in many rallies, touring car, and saloon car races, notable drivers including Stirling Moss, Mike Hawthorn, Tommy Sopwith, and Roy Salvadori.

In Australia, David McKay won the 1960 Australian Touring Car Championship at the wheel of a 3.4 Litre "Mark 1" and Bill Pitt won the 1961 Australian Touring Car Championship driving the same model.

On 22 January 1959 former motor racing world champion Mike Hawthorn died in an accident involving his own highly tuned 1957 3.4 Litre, registration VDU 881, on the A3 Guildford By-Pass in Surrey, England.

== Other sources ==
- Schrader, Halwart (2001), Typenkompass Jaguar – Personenwagen seit 1931 [Jaguar model guide - passenger cars since 1931] (in German), Stuttgart: Motorbuch-Verlag, ISBN 3-613-02106-4
- Stertkamp, Heiner (2006), Jaguar – die komplette Chronik von 1922 bis heute [Jaguar - the complete history from 1922 until today] (in German) (2nd ed.), Heel-Verlag, ISBN 3-89880-337-6
- Skilleter, Paul; Whyte, Andrew (1980), Jaguar Saloon Cars, Haynes, ISBN 0-85429-263-2
- "Editorial". Autocar magazine. 18 February 1966. Details of 2.4 engine power output.
