= 2013 Kumho Tyres V8 Touring Car Series =

Motor racing competition

2013 Super3 Series

Seasons
- ← 2012 2014 →

The 2013 Kumho Tyres V8 Touring Car Series was an Australian motor racing series for V8 Touring Cars, which are de-registered and superseded former V8 Supercars. Although the series utilised cars built for V8 Supercar racing, it was not an official V8 Supercar series.

It was the sixth running of the V8 Touring Car National Series. The series took place on the program of Shannons Nationals Motor Racing Championships events. It began at Sydney Motorsport Park on 22 March and finished at Sandown Raceway on 17 November after six meetings held in New South Wales, Victoria, Queensland and South Australia.

Shae Davies was the eventual series winner, holding off at late charge from Ryan Simpson. Simpson now holds the record for the most race wins in one V8 Touring Car Season, as well as the most round wins in a row.

== Teams and drivers ==
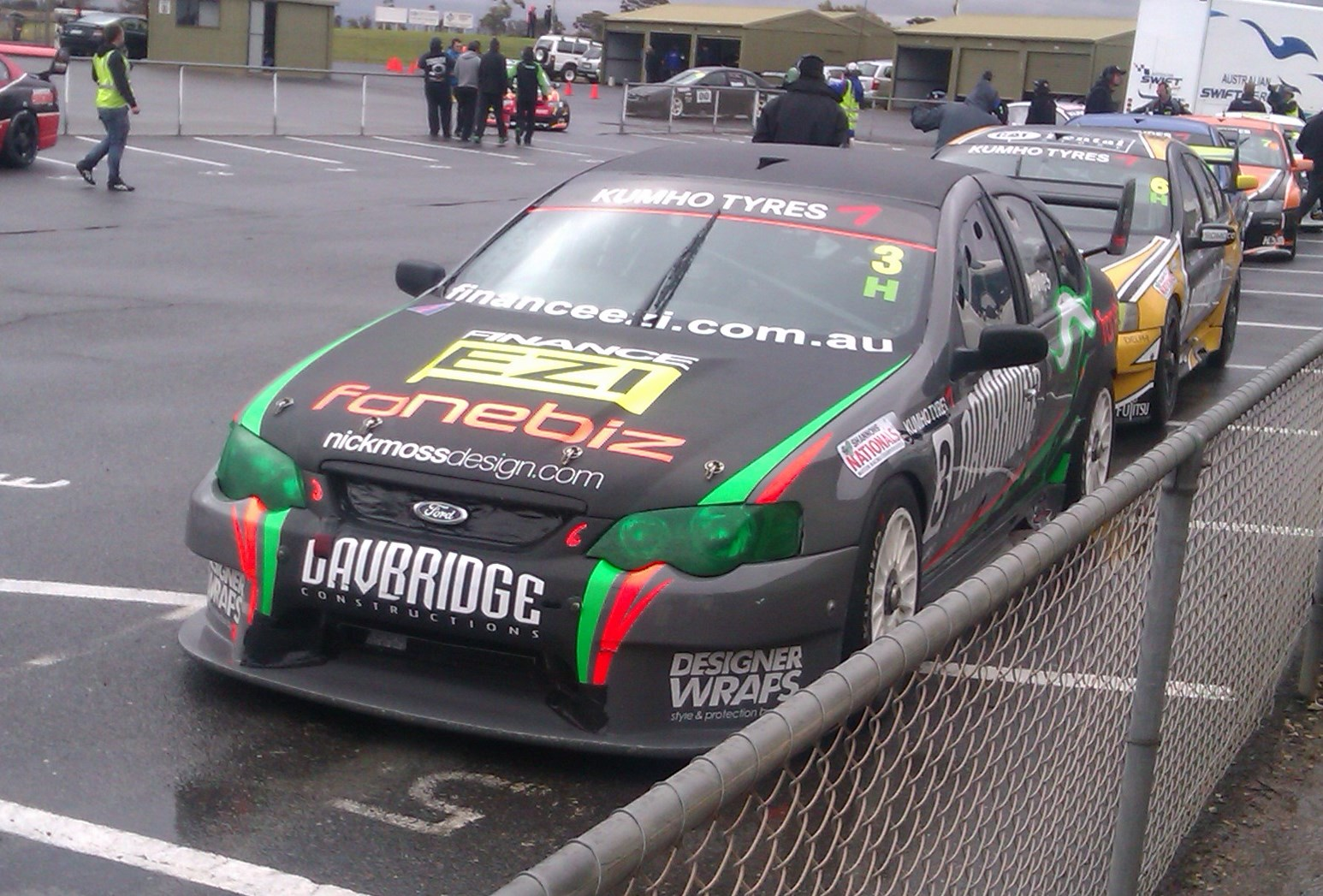
Shae Davies won the series driving a Ford BF Falcon

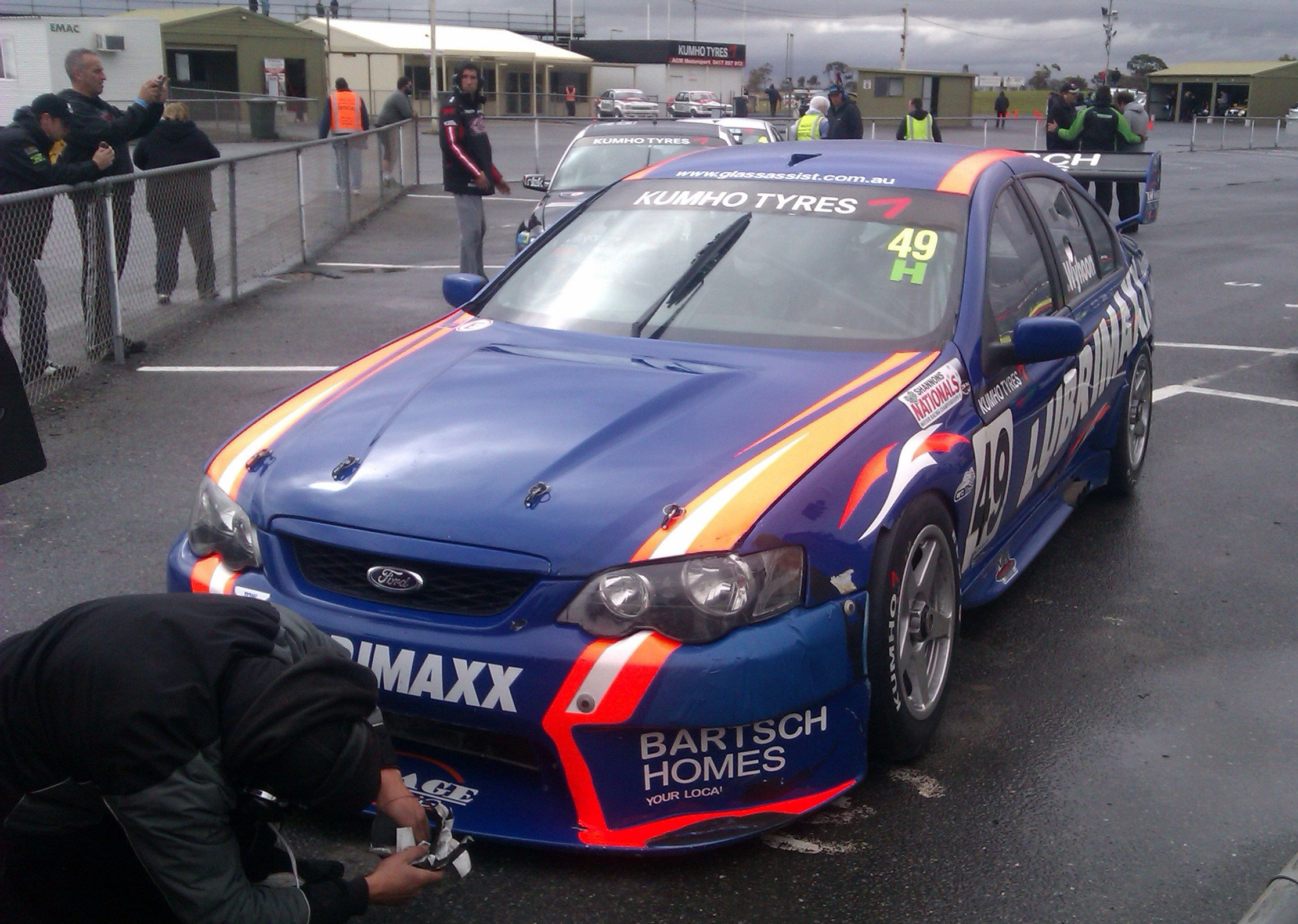
Terry Wyhoon placed third in the series driving a Ford BF Falcon

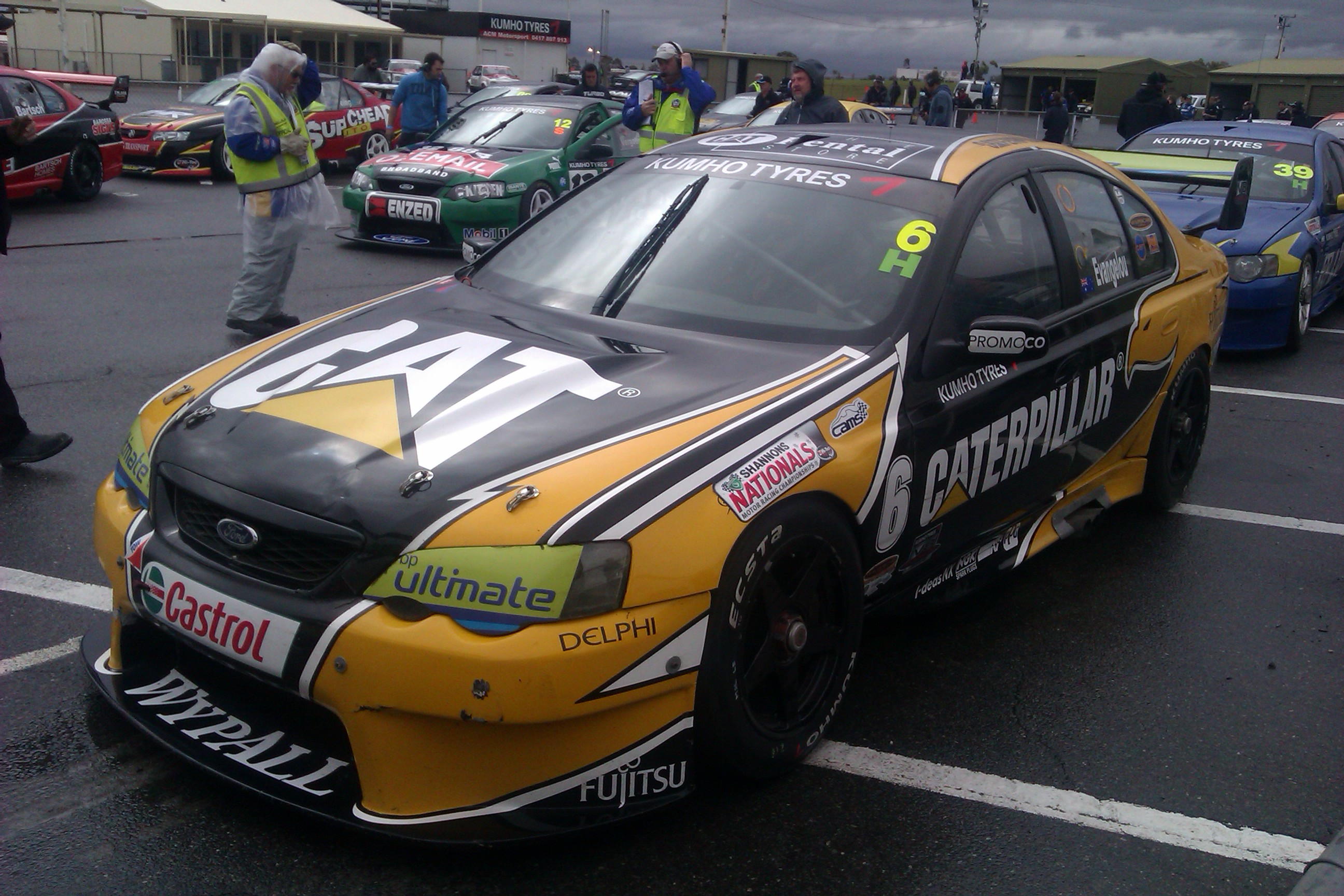
Tony Evangelou placed fourth in the series driving a Ford BA Falcon

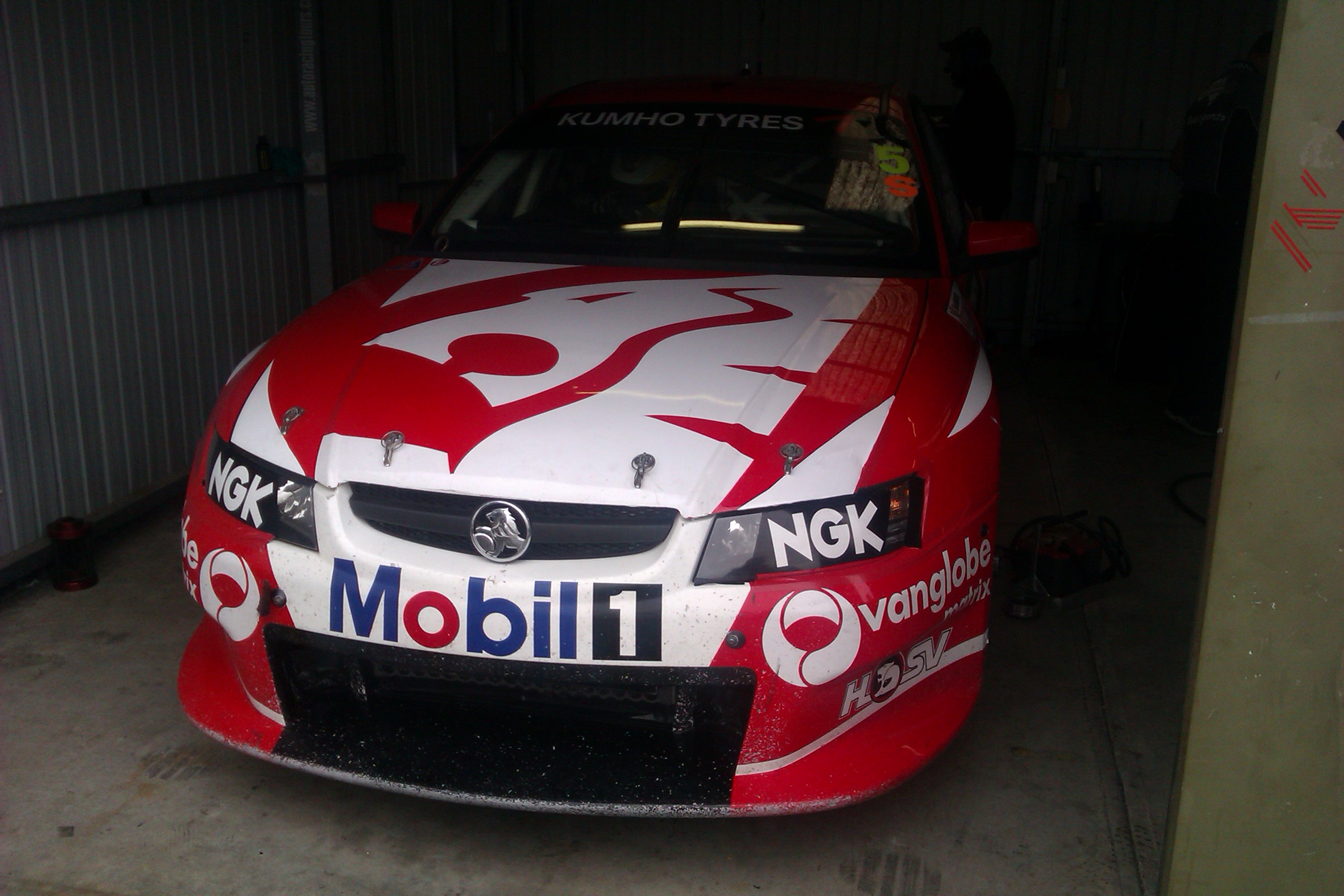
Matthew Hansen placed fifth in the series driving a Holden VZ Commodore

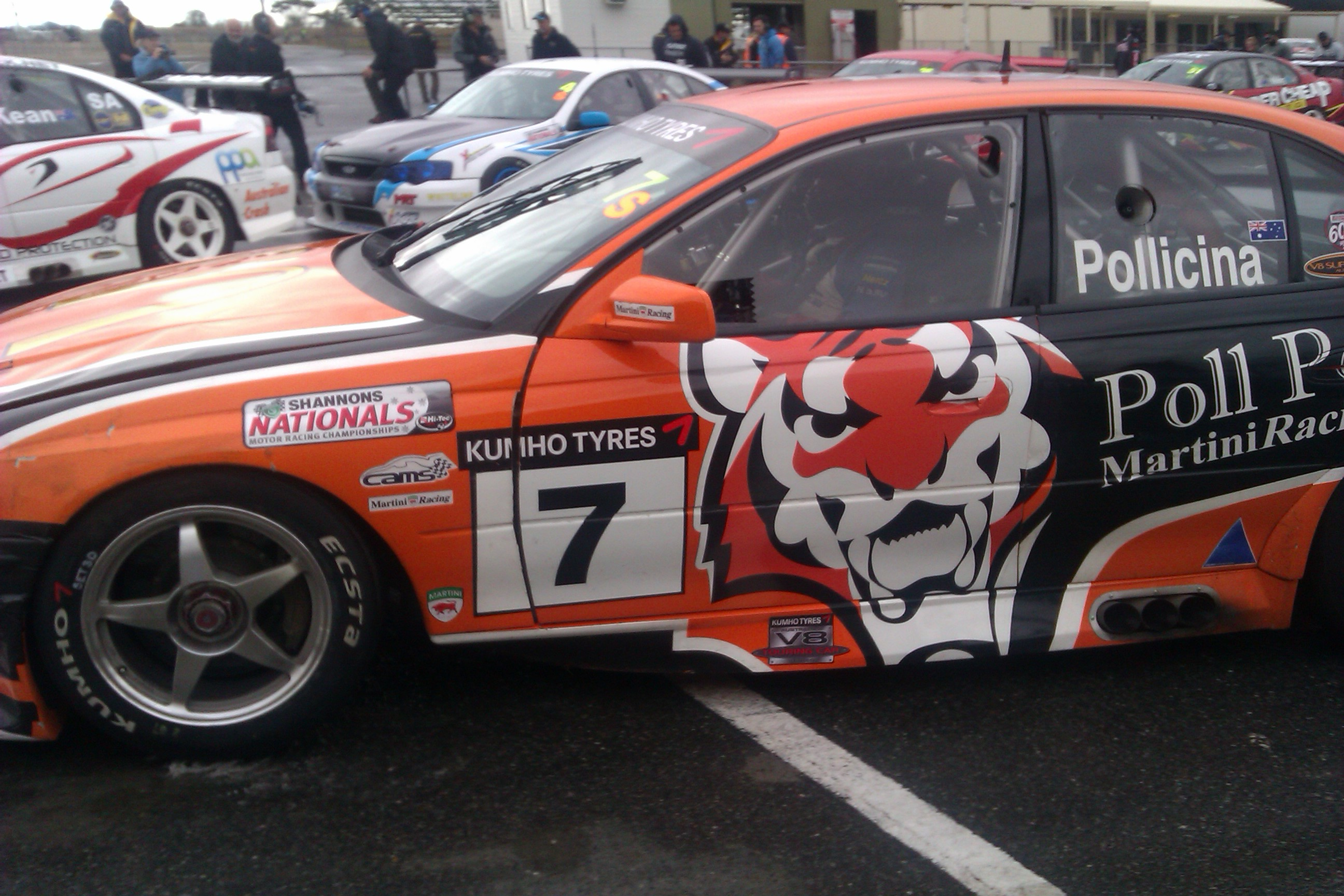
Jim Pollicina placed 14th in the series driving a Holden VZ Commodore

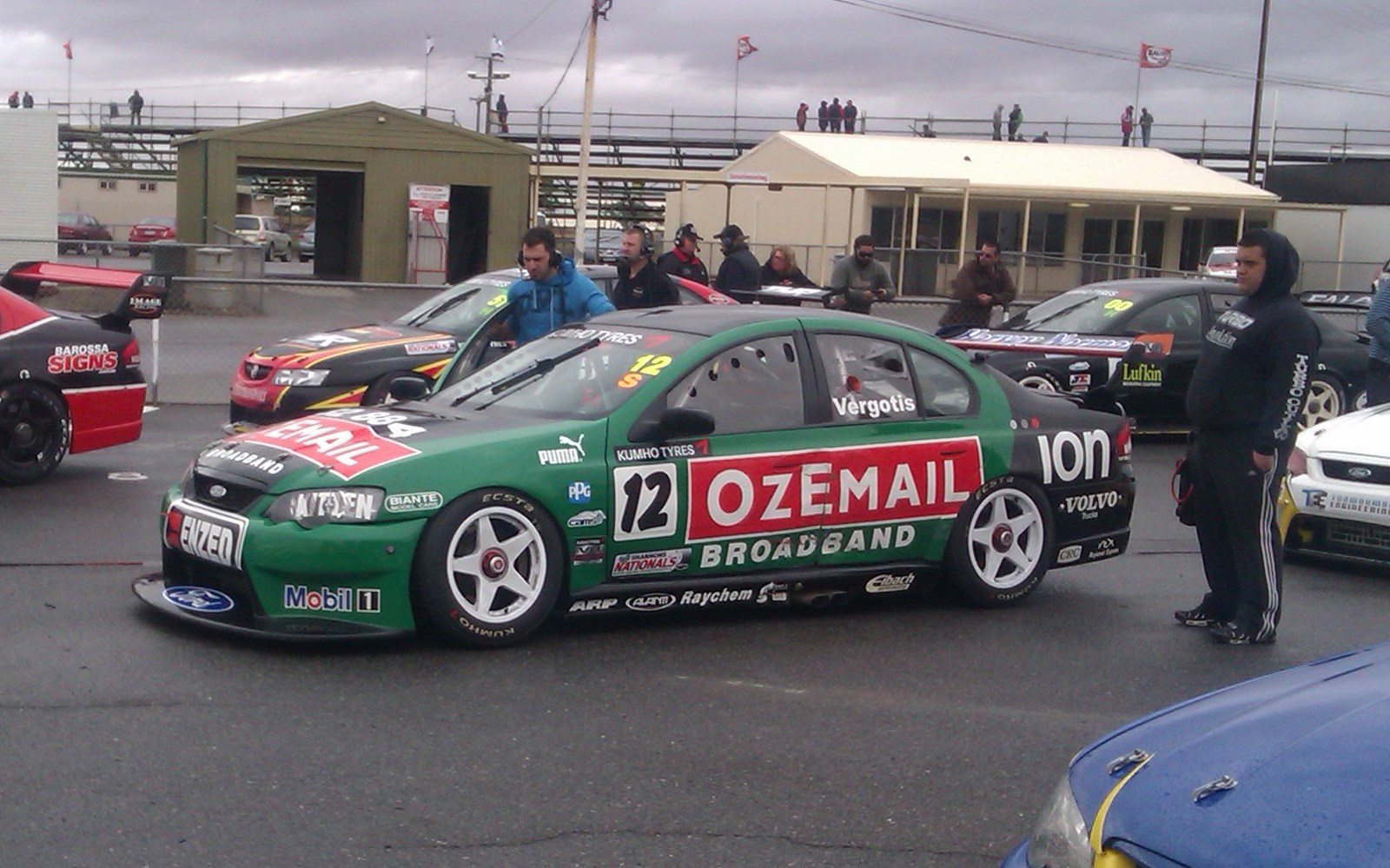
John Vergotis placed 15th in the series driving a Ford BA Falcon

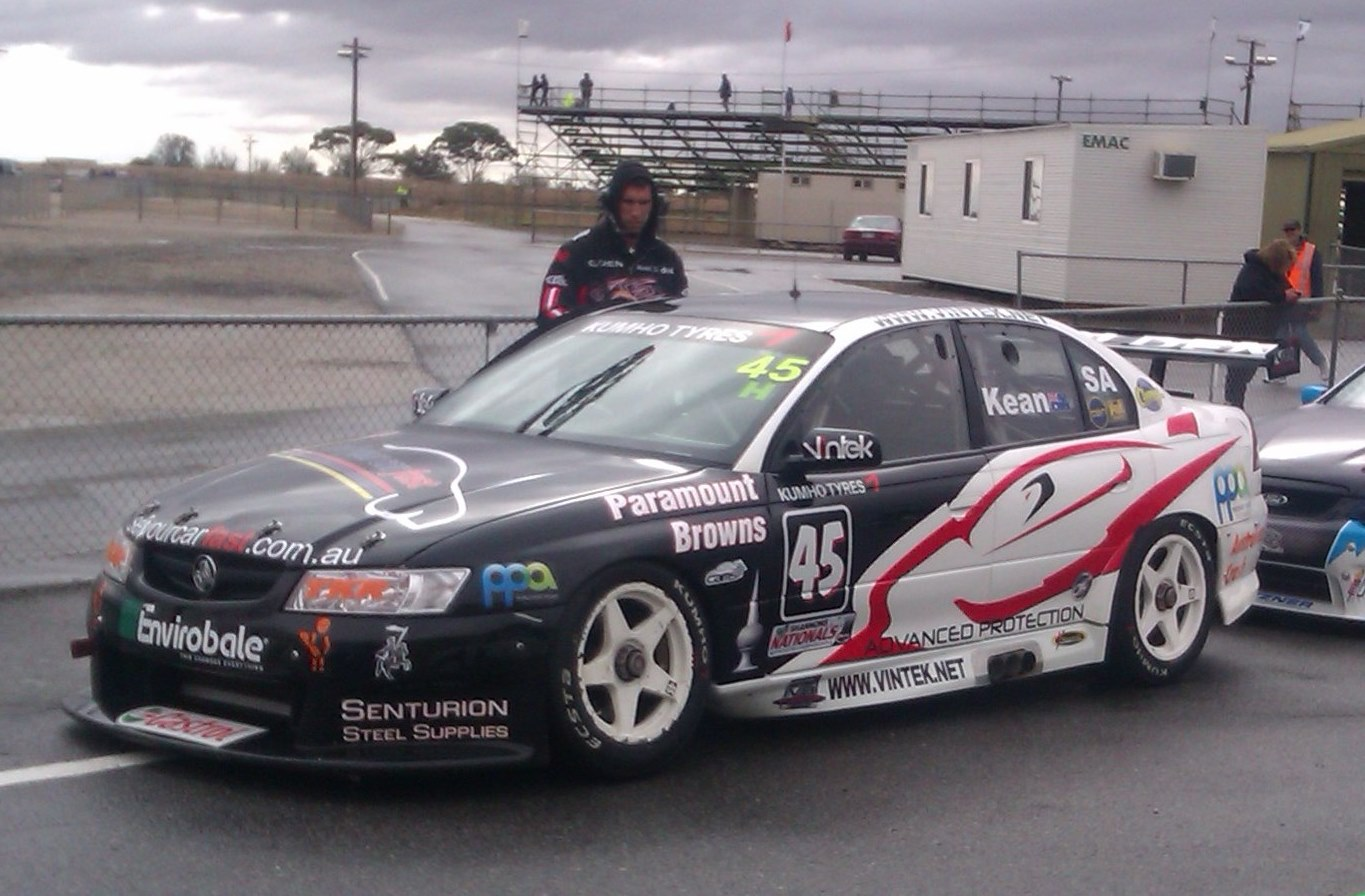
Josh Kean placed 22nd in the series driving a Holden VZ Commodore

The following teams and drivers competed in the 2013 Kumho Tyres V8 Touring Car Series

Team	No	Driver	Car
Falcon Spares & Repairs	00	Matt Chahda	Ford AU Falcon
Falcon Spares & Repairs	00	Matt Chahda	Ford BF Falcon
Parramatta Smash Repairs	2	Ryan Simpson	Ford BF Falcon
Fernandez Motorsport	3	Shae Davies	Ford BF Falcon
Dan Day Racing	4	Dan Day	Ford BF Falcon
ACM Motorsport	5	Matt Hansen	Holden VZ Commodore
501 Performance	6	Tony Evangelou	Ford BA Falcon
Poll Performance	7	Jim Pollicina	Holden VZ Commodore
Poll Performance	77	Sam Walter	Holden VZ Commodore
Ozzy Tyres	8	Steve Briffa	Holden VY Commodore
Finance EZI Racing	10	Maurice Pickering	Ford BA Falcon
JCV Automotive	12	John Vergotis	Ford BA Falcon
Eurostar Diesels Racing	14	Simon Tabinor	Ford BF Falcon
Essendon Tyrepower	20	Russell Pilven	Ford BA Falcon
Century 21 Hazelbrook	21	Chris Delfsma	Ford BA Falcon
Westco Equipment	22	Isidoro Ambrosio	Holden VZ Commodore
Westco Equipment	22	Dean Kovacevich	Holden VZ Commodore
Garioch Racing	23	Justin Garioch	Ford BA Falcon
Voight Contracting	25	Stephen Voight	Ford BA Falcon
Bartsch Homes	25	Michael Bartsch	Ford BA Falcon
MW Motorsport	28	Morgan Haber	Ford BF Falcon
MW Motorsport	28	Matthew White	Ford BF Falcon
MW Motorsport	62	Peter Rullo	Ford BF Falcon
MW Motorsport	62	Jack Le Brocq	Ford BF Falcon
Haymans Electrical	31	Ramon Connell	Ford AU Falcon
Image Racing	25	Dean Neville	Ford BA Falcon
Image Racing	35	Michael Hector	Ford BA Falcon
Image Racing	39	Chris Smerdon	Ford BA Falcon
Image Racing	49	Terry Wyhoon	Ford BF Falcon
The Edge Glass	46	Paul Pennisi	Holden VY Commodore
STR Truck Bodies	48	Matt Palmer	Ford BF Falcon
THR Developments	45	Josh Kean	Holden VZ Commodore
THR Developments	45	Jordan Skinner	Holden VZ Commodore
THR Developments	45	Gerard McLeod	Holden VZ Commodore
THR Developments	51	Ian Yeing	Holden VZ Commodore
ADG Engineering	57	Lyle Kearns	Holden VZ Commodore
USQ Engineering	72	Nathan Assaillit	Ford BF Falcon

== Calendar ==
The series was contested over six rounds.

Rd.	Circuit	Location	Date	Winner
1	Sydney Motorsport Park	Sydney, New South Wales	22–24 March	Shae Davies
2	Mallala Motor Sport Park	Mallala, South Australia	19–21 April	Terry Wyhoon
3	Winton Motor Raceway	Benalla, Victoria	21–23 June	Tony Evangelou
4	Queensland Raceway	Ipswich, Queensland	2–4 August	Ryan Simpson
5	Phillip Island Grand Prix Circuit	Phillip Island, Victoria	20–22 September	Ryan Simpson
6	Sandown Raceway	Melbourne, Victoria	15–17 November	Ryan Simpson

== Points system ==
Position	1st	2nd	3rd	4th	5th	6th	7th	8th	9th	10th	11th	12th	13th	14th	15th	16th	17th	18th	19th	20th
Qualifying	3																			
Races 1 & 2	40	35	31	27	23	20	17	15	13	11	10	9	8	7	6	5	4	3	2	1
Races 3	60	53	47	41	35	30	26	23	20	17	15	14	12	11	9	8	6	5	3	2

== Series results ==
Position	Driver	Car	Total points
1	Shae Davies	Ford BF Falcon	601
2	Ryan Simpson	Ford BF Falcon	530
3	Terry Wyhoon	Ford BF Falcon	505
4	Tony Evangelou	Ford BA Falcon	501
5	Matthew Hansen	Holden VZ Commodore	412
6	Steve Briffa	Holden VY Commodore	338
7	Nathan Assaillit	Ford BF Falcon	279
8	Matthew White	Ford BF Falcon	272
9	Morgan Haber	Ford BF Falcon	231
10	Chris Smerdon	Ford BA Falcon	171
11	Dan Day	Ford BF Falcon	168
12	Matt Chahda	Ford AU Falcon	161
13	Ian Yeing	Holden VZ Commodore	157
14	Jim Policina	Holden VZ Commodore	156
15	John Vergotis	Ford BA Falcon	135
16	Chris Delfsma	Ford BA Falcon	110
17	Isidoro Ambrosio	Holden VZ Commodore	104
18	Matthew Palmer	Ford BF Falcon	103
19	Maurice Pickering	Ford BA Falcon	100
20	Justin Garioch	Ford BA Falcon	87
21	Jack Le Brocq	Ford BF Falcon	85
22	Josh Kean	Holden VZ Commodore	83
23	Peter Rullo	Ford BF Falcon	81
24	Paul Pennisi	Holden VY Commodore	80
25	Sam Walter	Holden VZ Commodore	54
26	Dean Koacevich	Holden VZ Commodore	49
27	Jordan Skinner	Holden VZ Commodore	45
28	Michael Bartsch	Ford BA Falcon	43
29	Lyle Kearns	Holden VZ Commodore	34
30	Stephen Voight	Ford BA Falcon	25
31	Simon Tabinor	Ford BF Falcon	20
32	Gerard McLeod	Holden VZ Commodore	19
33	Michael Hector	Ford BA Falcon	18
34	Russell Pilven	Ford BA Falcon	9
35	Ramon Connell	Ford AU Falcon	9
36	Dean Neville	Ford BA Falcon	8
37	Shawn Jamieson		0
