= 2014 Kumho Tyres V8 Touring Car Series =

Motor racing competition

2014 Super3 Series

Seasons
- ← 2013 2015 →

The 2014 Kumho Tyres V8 Touring Car Series was an Australian motor racing competition for V8 Touring Cars, which are de-registered and superseded former V8 Supercars. Although the series utilised cars built for V8 Supercar racing, it was not an official V8 Supercar series. It involved two classes, the S class for cars with sequential gearboxes, and the H class for cars with H-pattern gearboxes.

It was the seventh running of the V8 Touring Car National Series. The series took place on the program of Shannons Nationals Motor Racing Championships events. It began at Mallala Motor Sport Park on 26 April and finished at Sydney Motorsport Park on 2 November after six meetings held in New South Wales, Victoria, Queensland and South Australia. It was sanctioned by the Confederation of Australian Motor Sport as a National Series, with Tri State Racing Pty Ltd appointed as the Category Manager.

The sequential gearbox class and the overall series was won by rookie Justin Ruggier, in a battle with Ryan Simpson. Although Simpson won three rounds to Ruggier's two, Simpson suffered from penalties and not being allowed to compete in one race at Phillip Island due to noise restrictions. Simpson still managed to break the record for the number of wins in the category with 10 victories. Matt Chahda finished 4th in the series and clinched the title for the highest placed driver with a H-pattern gearbox.

== Teams and drivers ==
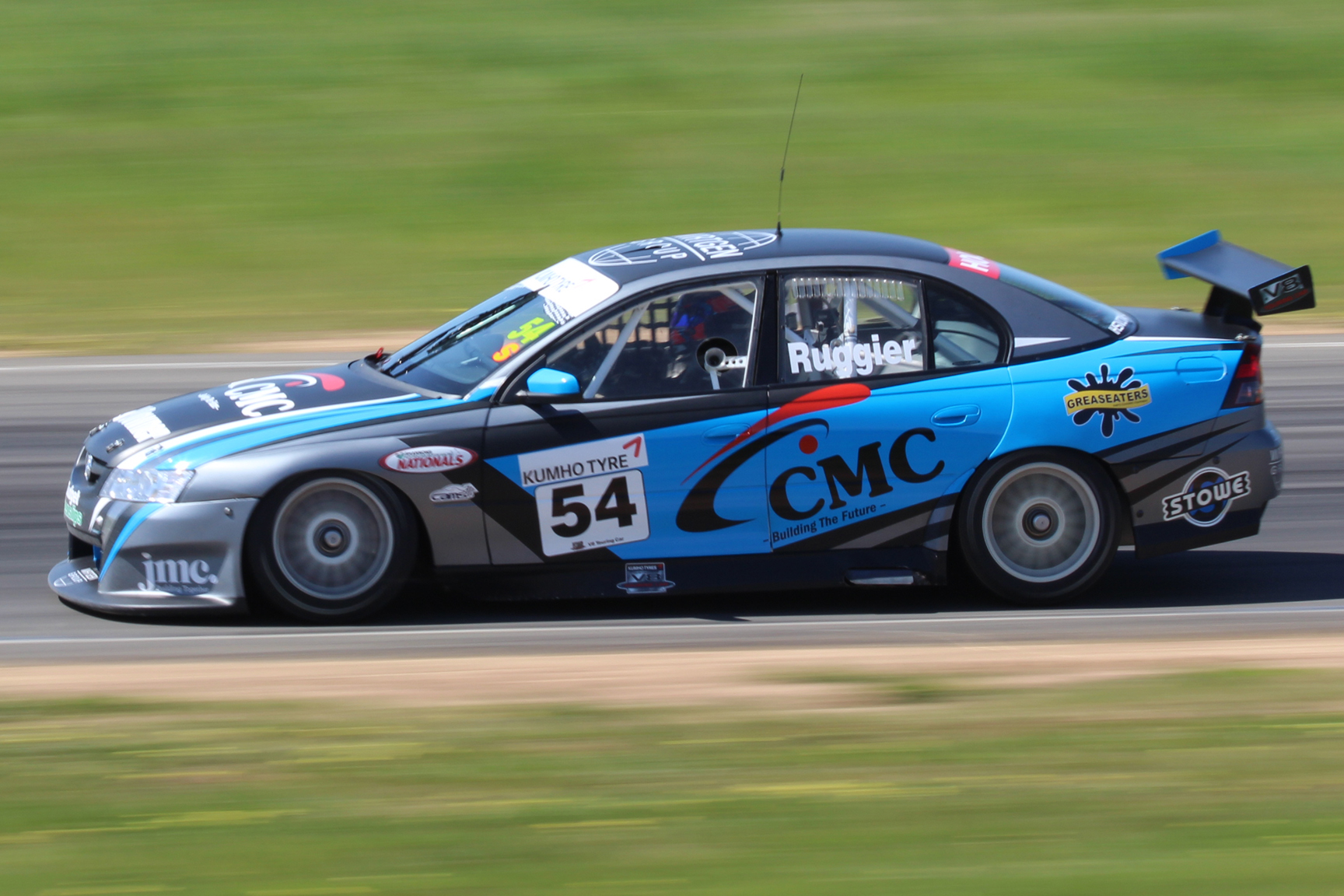
Justin Ruggier (Holden VZ Commodore placed first in the series

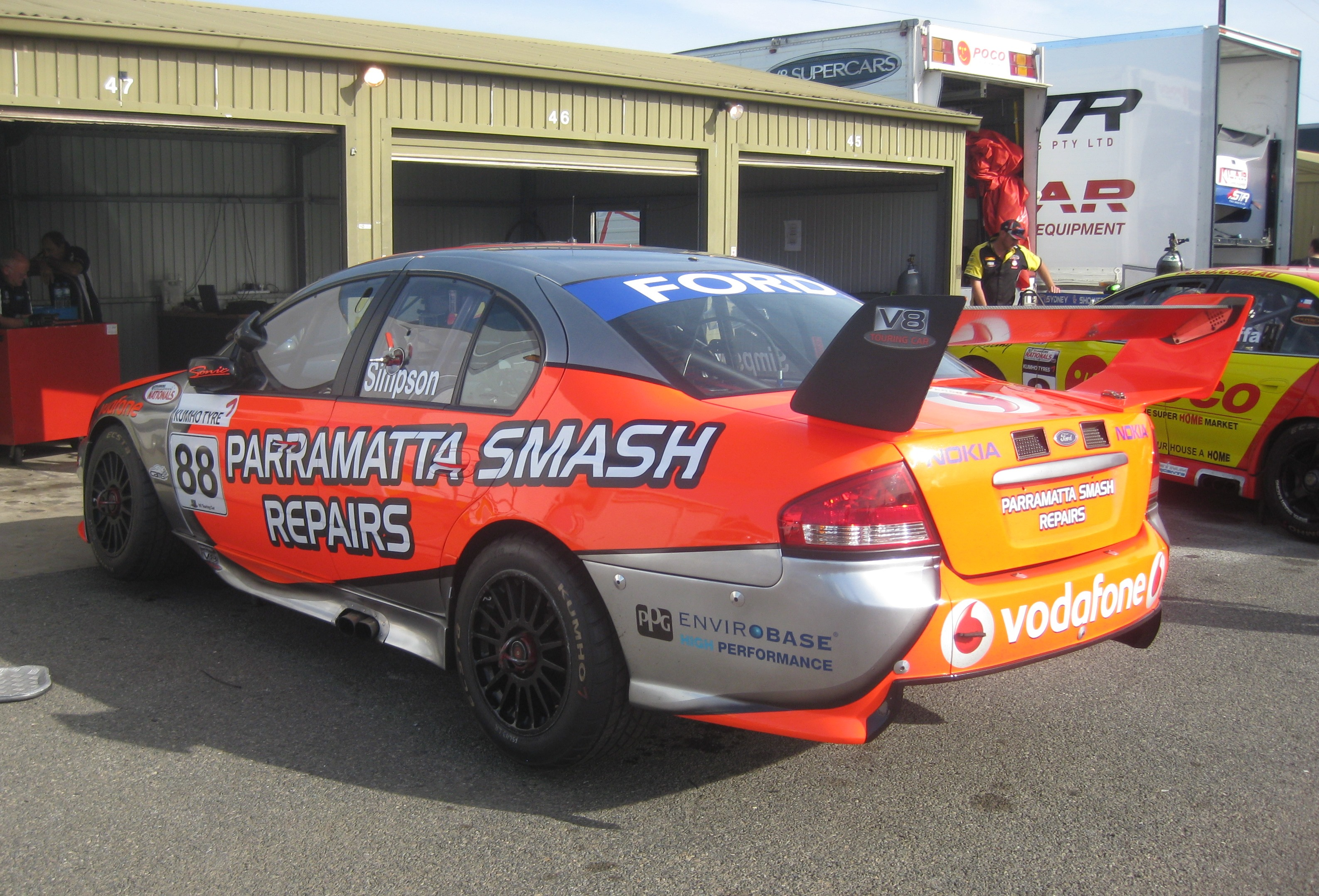
Ryan Simpson (Ford BF Falcon) placed second in the series

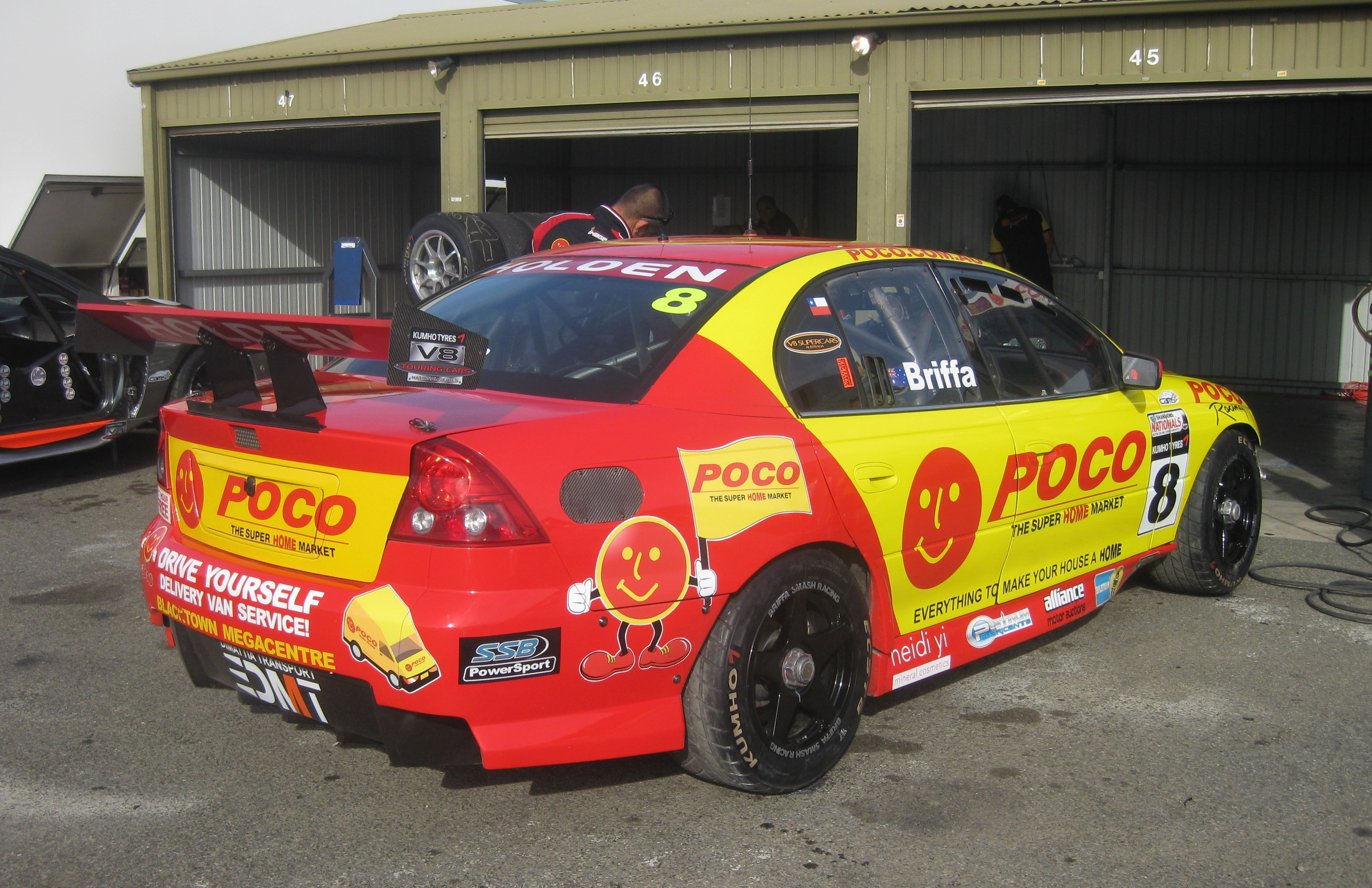
Steve Briffa (Holden VY Commodore placed fifth in the series

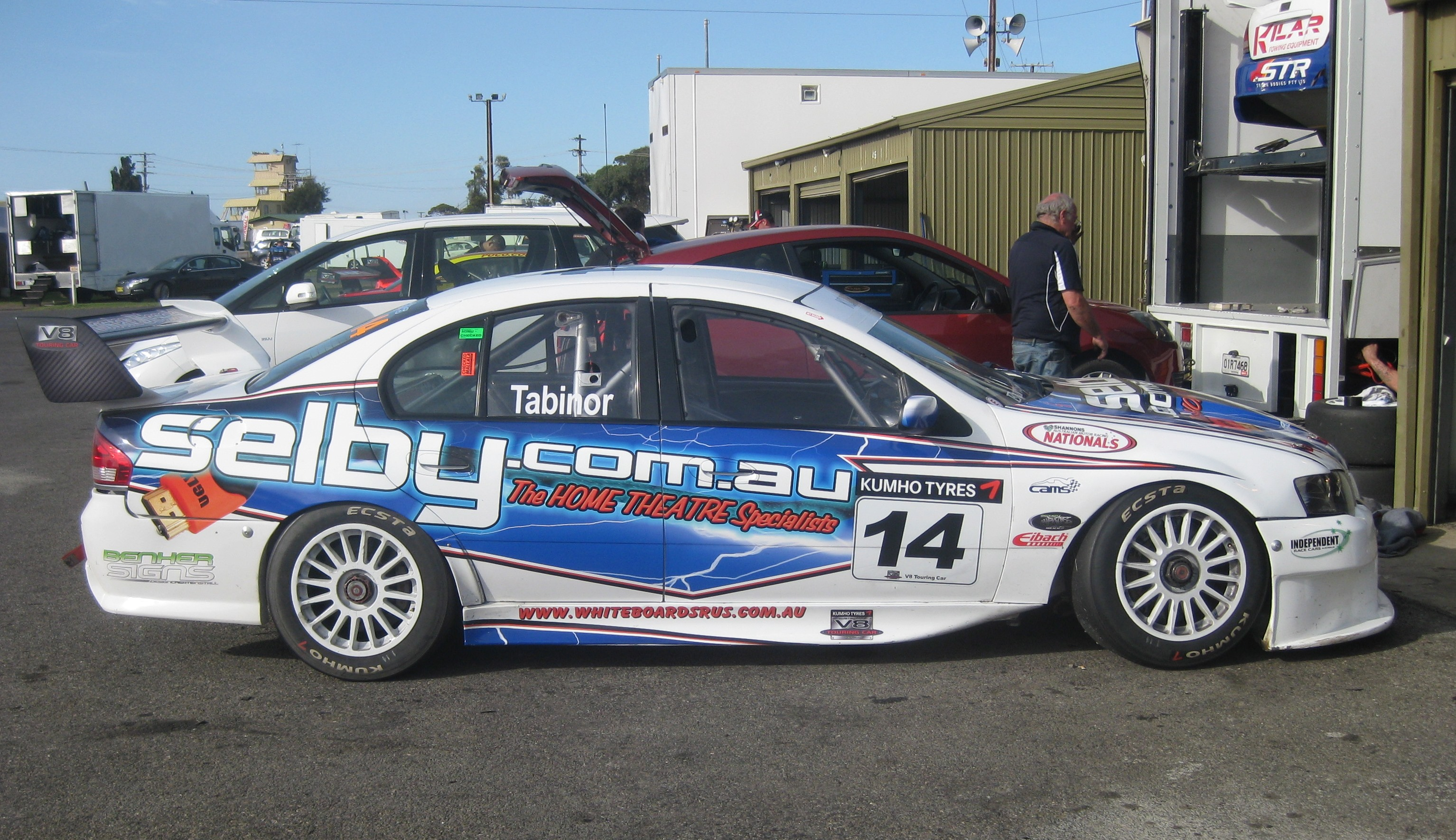
Simon Tabinor (Ford BF Falcon) placed eleventh in the series

The following teams and drivers competed in the 2014 Kumho Tyres V8 Touring Car Series:

| Team | No | Driver | Class | Car |
|---|---|---|---|---|
| Fernandez Motorsport | 3 | Jose Fernandez | H | Ford BA Falcon |
| Kustom Works/Supercar Parts | 4 | Shane Hunt | S | Ford BF Falcon |
| Voight Contracting | 5 | Aaron Tebb | H | Holden VZ Commodore |
| 501 Performance | 6 | Tony Evangelou | H | Ford BF Falcon |
| Poco Racing | 8 | Steve Briffa | H | Holden VY Commodore |
| JCV Automotive | 12 | John Vergotis | H | Ford BA Falcon |
| selby.com.au | 14 | Simon Tabinor | S | Ford BF Falcon |
| Enviropress | 16 | Darrin Renouf | H | Holden VX Commodore |
| Falcon Spares/Engine Master | 18 | Matt Chahda | H | Ford BA Falcon |
| Century 21 Haselbrook | 21 | Matt Chahda | H | Ford BA Falcon |
| STR Truck Bodies | 24 | Gerard McLeod | S | Ford BF Falcon |
| STR Truck Bodies | 24 | Drew Russell | S | Ford BF Falcon |
| STR Truck Bodies | 48 | Matthew Palmer | S | Ford BF Falcon |
| MW Motorsport | 26 | Matthew White | S | Ford BF Falcon |
| MW Motorsport | 28 | Ryan Cochran | S | Ford BF Falcon |
| Haymans Electrical | 31 | Ramon Connell | H | Ford AU Falcon |
| Eggleston Motorsport | 38 | Cameron McConville | S | Holden VZ Commodore |
| Eggleston Motorsport | 54 | Justin Ruggier | S | Holden VZ Commodore |
| Vectra Corp/Lubrimaxx | 39 | Chris Smerdon | S | Ford BA Falcon |
| THR Motorsport | 51 | Craig Dontas | H | Holden VZ Commodore |
| ADG Engineering | 57 | Lyle Kearns | H | Holden VZ Commodore |
| G&D Strong Excavations | 75 | Brendan Strong | H | Holden VZ Commodore |
| Parramatta Smash Repairs | 88 | Ryan Simpson | S | Ford BF Falcon |

== Calendar ==
The series was contested over six rounds.

| Rd. | Circuit | Location | Date | Winner |
|---|---|---|---|---|
| 1 | Mallala Motor Sport Park | Mallala, South Australia | 25–27 April | Ryan Simpson |
| 2 | Winton Motor Raceway | Benalla, Victoria | 13–15 June | Ryan Simpson |
| 3 | Queensland Raceway | Ipswich, Queensland | 8–10 August | Ryan Simpson |
| 4 | Phillip Island Grand Prix Circuit | Phillip Island, Victoria | 19–21 September | Cameron McConville |
| 5 | Wakefield Park | Goulburn, New South Wales | 17–10 October | Justin Ruggier |
| 6 | Sydney Motorsport Park | Sydney, New South Wales | 31 October-2 November | Justin Ruggier |

== Points system ==
| Position | 1st | 2nd | 3rd | 4th | 5th | 6th | 7th | 8th | 9th | 10th | 11th | 12th | 13th | 14th | 15th | 16th | 17th | 18th | 19th | 20th |
| Qualifying | 3 | | | | | | | | | | | | | | | | | | | |
| Races 1 & 2 | 40 | 35 | 31 | 27 | 23 | 20 | 17 | 15 | 13 | 11 | 10 | 9 | 8 | 7 | 6 | 5 | 4 | 3 | 2 | 1 |
| Races 3 | 60 | 53 | 47 | 41 | 35 | 30 | 26 | 23 | 20 | 17 | 15 | 14 | 12 | 11 | 9 | 8 | 6 | 5 | 3 | 2 |

== Series results ==
| Position | Driver | Car | Class | Total points |
| 1 | Justin Ruggier | Holden VZ Commodore | S | 763 |
| 2 | Ryan Simpson | Ford BF Falcon | S | 709 |
| 3 | Matthew Palmer | Ford BF Falcon | S | 488 |
| 4 | Matt Chahda | Ford BA Falcon | H | 447 |
| 5 | Steve Briffa | Holden VY Commodore | H | 418 |
| 6 | Drew Russell | Ford BF Falcon | S | 227 |
| 7 | John Vergotis | Ford BA Falcon | S | 226 |
| 8 | Chris Delfsma | Ford BA Falcon | H | 137 |
| 9 | Cameron McConville | Holden VZ Commodore | S | 133 |
| 10 | Brendan Strong | Holden VZ Commodore | H | 127 |
| 11 | Simon Tabinor | Ford BF Falcon | S | 114 |
| 12 | Shane Hunt | Ford BF Falcon | S | 106 |
| 13 | Chris Smerdon | Ford BA Falcon | S | 99 |
| 14 | Aaron Tebb | Holden VZ Commodore | H | 71 |
| 15 | Ryan Cochrane | Ford BF Falcon | S | 66 |
| 16 | Darrin Renouf | Holden VX Commodore | H | 57 |
| 17 | Jose Fernandez | Ford BA Falcon | H | 55 |
| 18 | Gerard McLeod | Ford BF Falcon | S | 52 |
| 19 | Craig Dontas | Holden VZ Commodore | H | 51 |
| 20 | Lyle Kearns | Holden VZ Commodore | H | 24 |
| 21 | Tony Evangelou | Ford BF Falcon | H | 0 |
| 22 | Ramon Connell | Ford AU Falcon | H | 0 |
