= 2009 Shannons V8 Touring Car National Series =

Motor racing competition

2009 Super3 Series

Seasons
- ← 2008 2010 →

The 2009 Shannons V8 Touring Car National Series is the second running of the V8 Touring Car National Series. The series takes place on the program of Shannons Nationals Motor Racing Championships events. The series was won by South Australian driver Adam Wallis.

== Calendar ==
The 2009 Shannons V8 Touring Car National Series will consist of five rounds held across three states:

Rd.	Circuit	Location	Date	Winner
1	Wakefield Park	Goulburn, New South Wales	25–26 April	Adam Wallis
2	Mallala Motor Sport Park	Mallala, South Australia	6–7 June	Adam Wallis
3	Winton Motor Raceway	Benalla, Victoria	27–28 June	Terry Wyhoon
4	Oran Park Raceway	Sydney, New South Wales	29–30 August	Shane Beikoff
5	Sandown Raceway	Melbourne, Victoria	28–29 November	Steve Owen

== Teams and drivers ==
The following teams and drivers have competed during the 2009 Shannons V8 Touring Car National Series.

Team	No	Driver	Car
Sonax	13	Peter McNiven	Holden VT Commodore
Steve Ingwersen Painting	15	Steve Ingwersen	Holden VS Commodore
Image Racing	18	Leigh Moran	Ford EL Falcon
Image Racing	49	Terry Wyhoon	Ford AU Falcon
Image Racing	50	Mark Sheppard	Ford AU Falcon
JCV Automotive	26	John Vergotis	Ford AU Falcon
Timbercraft Total Race	31	Paul Stubber	Holden VX Commodore
Eggleston Motorsport	38	Ben Eggleston	Holden VX Commodore
Harmony	39	Chris Smerdon	Ford AU Falcon
Warren Mining	62	Adam Wallis	Holden VX Commodore
Turbo Brisbane	68	Jonathan Beikoff; Shane Beikoff	Ford AU Falcon
Cavalier Homes	81	Michael Bartsch	Ford AU Falcon
Power Plus 98	98	Steve Owen	Holden VX Commodore

== Driver standings ==
Pos	Driver	Rd 1			Rd 2			Rd 3			Rd 4			Rd 5			Pts
1	Adam Wallis	1st	2nd	1st	1st	1st	1st	3rd	2nd	3rd	2nd	3rd	3rd	4th	2nd	2nd	527
2	Terry Wyhoon	3rd	1st	5th	6th	3rd	4th	2nd	1st	1st	8th	1st	1st	2nd	7th	3rd	467
3	Chris Smerdon	5th	6th	3rd	2nd	2nd	2nd	5th	3rd	2nd	6th	5th	4th	7th	5th	5th	401
4	Michael Bartsch	6th	7th	4th	8th	4th	3rd	6th	9th	7th	4th	Ret	6th	5th	6th	6th	297
5	Peter McNiven	Ret	4th	6th	5th	8th	6th	4th	4th	6th	3rd	6th	7th	Ret	4th	7th	291
6	Mark Sheppard	7th	8th	7th	9th	7th	9th	8th	7th	4th	5th	4th	5th	6th	8th	Ret	259
7	Steve Owen							1st	6th	5th				1st	1st	1st	205
8	Jonathan Beikoff	2nd	3rd	2nd										3rd	3rd	4th	190
9	John Vergotis	4th	5th	10th	4th	6th	8th	Ret	5th	8th							161
10	Steve Ingwersen	9th	9th	8th	DNS	DNS	DNS	7th	8th	9th	7th	7th	8th				135
11	Shane Beikoff										1st	2nd	2nd				110
12	Leigh Moran	8th	10th	9th				9th	Ret	Ret				8th	Ret	8th	82
13	Ben Eggleston				3rd	5th	7th										71
14	Paul Stubber				7th	9th	5th										53

Colour	Result
Gold	Winner
Silver	Second place
Bronze	Third place
Green	Points classification
Blue	Non-points classification
Blue	Non-classified finish (NC)
Purple	Retired, not classified (Ret)
Red	Did not qualify (DNQ)
Red	Did not pre-qualify (DNPQ)
Black	Disqualified (DSQ)
White	Did not start (DNS)
White	Withdrew (WD)
White	Race cancelled (C)
Blank	Did not practice (DNP)
Blank	Did not arrive (DNA)
Blank	Excluded (EX)

== See also ==
- 2009 V8 Supercar season
