= 2010 Shannons V8 Touring Car National Series =

Motor racing competition

2010 Super3 Series

Seasons
- ← 2009 2011 →

The 2010 Shannons V8 Touring Car National Series was the third running of the V8 Touring Car National Series. The series took place on the program of Shannons Nationals Motor Racing Championships events. The Series began at Symmons Plains Raceway on 10 April and finished at Sandown Raceway on 24 October. Entries were hit hard in 2010 with just seven cars appearing across the opening two rounds and only three appearing at both of the first two events. Entries picked up after that, peaking at 14 cars at Winton.

Experienced V8 Supercar racer Tony Evangelou clinched the series a round early at Eastern Creek Raceway. Evengelou won eight of the 15 races and all five rounds. Evangelou dominated the point score, over 200 points ahead of Terry Wyhoon, who moved into second place passing Chris Smerdon at the final round. Wyhoon won four of the races that Evangelou did not win, with the other three won by Dean Neville, Scott Loadsman and Sam Walter.

== Calendar ==
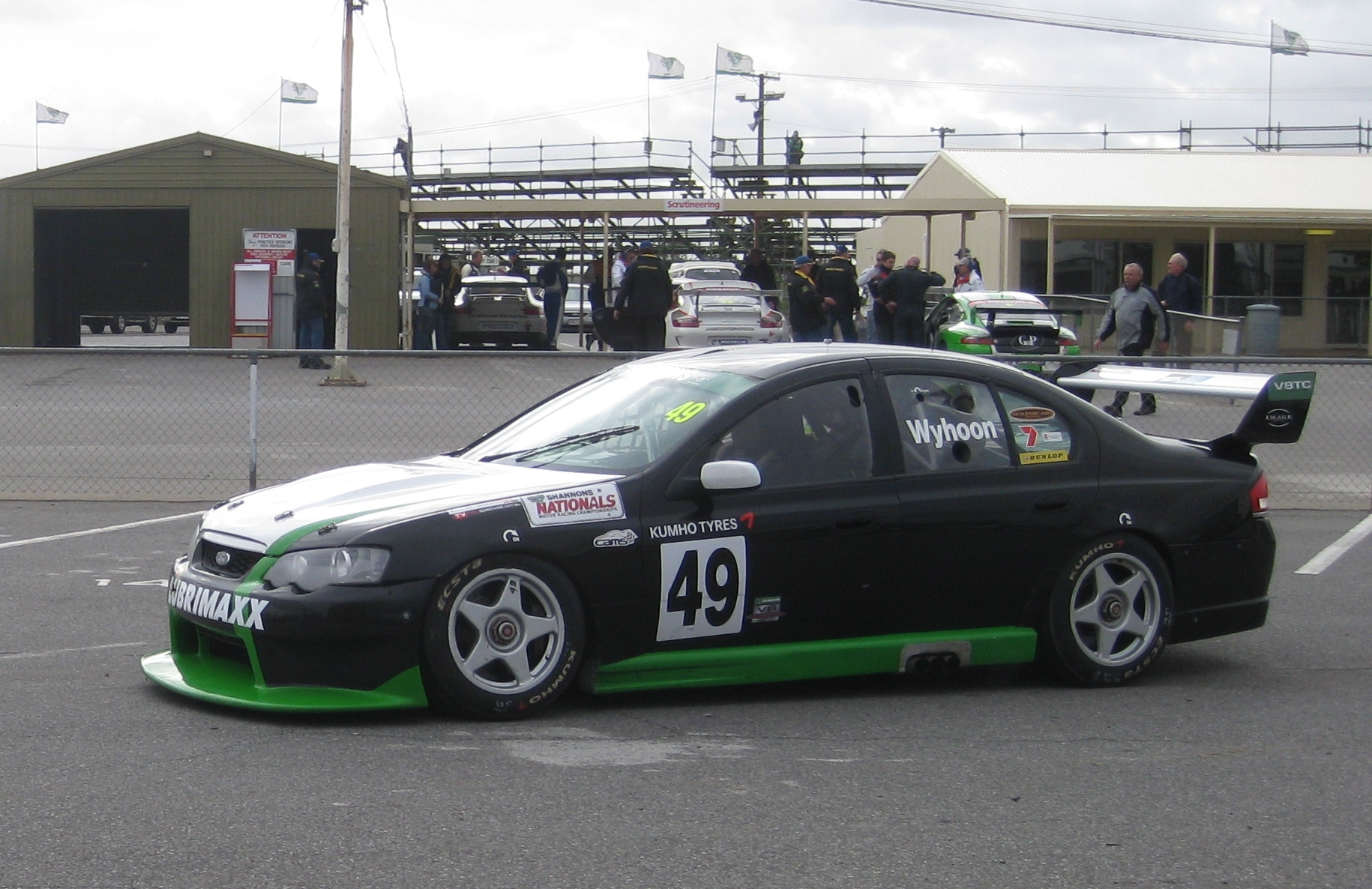
The Ford BA Falcon of Terry Wyhoon at Mallala Motor Sport Park for Round 2 of the 2010 Shannons V8 Touring Car National Series

The 2010 Shannons V8 Touring Car National Series comprised five rounds held across four states:

Rd.	Circuit	Location	Date	Winner
1	Symmons Plains Raceway	Launceston, Tasmania	10–11 April	Terry Wyhoon
2	Mallala Motor Sport Park	Mallala, South Australia	29–30 May	Tony Evangelou
3	Winton Motor Raceway	Benalla, Victoria	26–27 June	Tony Evangelou
4	Eastern Creek Raceway	Sydney, New South Wales	11–12 September	Tony Evangelou
5	Sandown Raceway	Melbourne, Victoria	23–24 October	Tony Evangelou

== Points structure ==
Points were awarded for Time Attack dependent on number of cars that took part in qualifying, with the winner scoring two points for each car to compete with gaps of two descending from that point.

Points	1st	2nd	3rd	4th	5th	6th	7th	8th	9th	10th
Qualifying	3									
Time Attack	varies									
Races 1, 2 & 3	40	35	31	27	23	20	17	15	13	11

== Teams and drivers ==
The following teams and drivers have competed during the 2010 Shannons V8 Touring Car National Series.

Team	No	Driver	Car
Hansen Pty Ltd	5	Matthew Hansen	Ford AU Falcon
ANT Racing	6	Tony Evangelou	Ford BA Falcon
Steve Ingwersen Painting	15	Steve Ingwersen	Holden VS Commodore
Image Racing	18	Leigh Moran	Ford EL Falcon
Image Racing	41	Terry Wyhoon	Ford AU Falcon; Ford BA Falcon
Image Racing	49	Mark Sheppard	Ford AU Falcon
Century 21 Hazelbrook	21	Chris Delfsma	Ford AU Falcon
SA Tractor; Retro Blast	22	Dean Kovacevich; Isidoro Ambrosio	Holden VY Commodore
JCV Automotive	26	John Vergotis	Ford AU Falcon
Power Plus Fuels	27	Shaun Fennell	Holden VX Commodore
Sydney Star Racing	33; 95	Stephen Voight	Holden VY Commodore
Sydney Star Racing	98	Aaron Tebb	Holden VY Commodore
Eggleston Motorsport	38	Ben Eggleston	Holden VX Commodore
Harmony	39	Chris Smerdon	Ford AU Falcon; Ford BA Falcon
Greg Murphy Racing	47	Sam Walter	Holden VY Commodore
Loadsman Racing Team	62	Scott Loadsman	Holden VY Commodore
Kitome	69	Dean Neville	Ford BA Falcon
Bartsch Builders	81	Michael Bartsch	Ford AU Falcon

== Driver standings ==
Pos	Driver	Rd 1				Rd 2				Rd 3				Rd 4				Rd 5				Pts
1	Tony Evangelou	2nd	3rd	1st	2nd	1st	1st	2nd	2nd	1st	1st	2nd	1st	2nd	2nd	3rd	1st	2nd	1st	1st	1st	648
2	Terry Wyhoon	1st	1st	2nd	1st	5th	2nd	1st	1st	3rd	Ret	4th	Ret					3rd	2nd	2nd	2nd	414
3	Chris Smerdon	3rd	2nd	4th	3rd	2nd	3rd	3rd	3rd	5th	4th	3rd	3rd					1st	Ret	DNS	DNS	335
4	Mark Shephard	4th	Ret	3rd	Ret					13th	5th	5th	5th	5th	6th	5th	5th	5th	5th	8th	4th	261
5	John Vergotis									7th	6th	6th	7th	3rd	4th	4th	2nd	6th	Ret	5th	8th	226
6	Matthew Hansen					4th	6th	6th	6th	10th	9th			10th	8th	8th	9th	8th	4th	4th	6th	214
7	Stephen Voight													4th	3rd	Ret	3rd	4th	3rd	Ret	3rd	152
8	Dean Neville									4th	2nd	1st	2nd									132
9	Chris Delfsma									9th	8th	10th	8th	8th	5th	6th	4th					129
10	Aaron Tebb									12th	Ret	Ret	9th	9th	7th	7th	7th	7th	Ret	6th	5th	125
11	Michael Bartsch					3rd	4th	4th	4th	6th	Ret	7th	Ret									124
12	Isidoro Ambrosio									8th	7th	8th	6th					9th	7th	7th	7th	121
13	Scott Loadsman													1st	1st	2nd	10th					106
14	Dean Kovacevich						5th	5th	5th					7th	Ret	9th	8th					105
15	Ben Eggleston									2nd	3rd	9th	4th									97
16	Sam Walter													6th	Ret	1st	6th					70
17	Shaun Fennell																	DNS	6th	3rd	Ret	51
18	Steve Ingwersen									11th	10th	Ret	DNS									19
	Leigh Moran										Ret	Ret	DNS									0

Colour	Result
Gold	Winner
Silver	Second place
Bronze	Third place
Green	Points classification
Blue	Non-points classification
Blue	Non-classified finish (NC)
Purple	Retired, not classified (Ret)
Red	Did not qualify (DNQ)
Red	Did not pre-qualify (DNPQ)
Black	Disqualified (DSQ)
White	Did not start (DNS)
White	Withdrew (WD)
White	Race cancelled (C)
Blank	Did not practice (DNP)
Blank	Did not arrive (DNA)
Blank	Excluded (EX)

== See also ==
2010 V8 Supercar season
