= 2015 Kumho Tyres Australian V8 Touring Car Series =

Motorsport season

2015 Super3 Series

Seasons
- ← 2014 2016 →

The 2015 Kumho Tyres Australian V8 Touring Car Series was an Australian motor racing competition for de-registered V8 Supercars. It was sanctioned by the Confederation of Australian Motor Sport as a National Series, with Tri State Racing Pty Ltd appointed as the Category Manager. The series was the eighth in a sequence of annual Australian V8 Touring Car Series and the fifth to carry sponsorship from Kumho Tyres.

The series was won by Liam McAdam.

== Entries ==
| Manufacturer | Model | Team | No. | Driver | Class | Rounds |
|---|---|---|---|---|---|---|
| Ford | BA Falcon | Steve Briffa Racing | 9 | (Australia) Scott Loadsman | P | 3 |
| Ford | BA Falcon | JCV Automotive | 12 | (Australia) John Vergotis | P | All |
| Ford | BA Falcon | Vectra Group | 39 | (Australia) Chris Smerdon | P | All |
| Ford | BA Falcon | Image Racing | 16 | (Australia) Leigh Moran | P | 2, 4 |
| Ford | BF Falcon | Image Racing | 49 | (Australia) Michael Hector | P | 1-2, 4 |
| Ford | BF Falcon | JCH Electrical | 5 | (Australia) Jason Heck | P | All |
| Ford | BF Falcon | 501 Performance | 6 | (Australia) Tony Evangelou | P | 2, 4-5 |
| Ford | BF Falcon | Century 21 Hazelbrook | 21 | (Australia) Chris Delfsma | P | 1-3 |
| Ford | BF Falcon | STR Truck Bodies | 48 | (Australia) Matthew Palmer | P | All |
| Ford | BF Falcon | Kostecki Brothers Racing | 56 | (Australia) Jake Kostecki | P | 1-4 |
| Ford | BF Falcon | Performance West | 62 | (Australia) Alex Rullo | P | All |
| Ford | BF Falcon | Douglas Barry Specialists | 88 | (Australia) Steven Devjak | P | All |
| Holden | VZ Commodore | Pollicina Motorsports | 7 | (Australia) Jim Pollicina | P | All |
| Holden | VZ Commodore | Poco Racing | 8 | (Australia) Steve Briffa | P | All |
| Holden | VZ Commodore | Enviropress | 15 | (Australia) Darrin Renouf | P | 5 |
| Holden | VZ Commodore | Eggleston Motorsport | 38 | (Australia) Liam McAdam | P | All |
| Holden | VZ Commodore | Eggleston Motorsport | 54 | (Australia) Jack Perkins | P | 1 |
| Holden | VZ Commodore | SA Racing Logistics | 45 | (Australia) Jason Leoncini | P | 1 |
| Holden | VZ Commodore | DG Engineering | 57 | (Australia) Lyle Kearns | P | 3-4 |
| Holden | VZ Commodore | Strong Excavations | 75 | (Australia) Brendan Strong | P | 1-3, 5 |

| Symbol | Class |
|---|---|
| P | Pro |
| P | Privateer |

== Series schedule ==
The series was contested over five rounds.

| Round | Circuit | Date | Format | Round winner | Car |
| 1 | Sandown Raceway | 27–29 March | Three races | Jack Perkins | Holden VZ Commodore |
| 2 | Winton Motor Raceway | 12–14 June | Three races | Alex Rullo | Ford BF Falcon |
| 3 | Queensland Raceway | 7–9 August | Three races | Alex Rullo | Ford BF Falcon |
| 4 | Phillip Island Grand Prix Circuit | 18–20 September | Three races | Liam McAdam | Holden VZ Commodore |
| 5 | Sydney Motorsport Park | 13–15 November | Three races | Liam McAdam | Holden VZ Commodore |

== Classes ==
Drivers competed in two classes:

- Pro - for drivers of cars entered by professional race teams and car preparers
- Privateer - for drivers who prepared and operated their own car(s)

== Points system ==
Series points were awarded on the following basis at each round:

| Position | 1st | 2nd | 3rd | 4th | 5th | 6th | 7th | 8th | 9th | 10th | 11th | 12th | 13th | 14th | 15th | 16th | 17th | 18th | 19th | 20th to last |
| Qualifying | 3 | | | | | | | | | | | | | | | | | | | |
| Races 1 & 2 | 40 | 35 | 31 | 27 | 23 | 20 | 17 | 15 | 13 | 11 | 10 | 9 | 8 | 7 | 6 | 5 | 4 | 3 | 2 | 1 |
| Races 3 | 60 | 53 | 47 | 41 | 35 | 30 | 26 | 23 | 20 | 17 | 15 | 14 | 12 | 11 | 9 | 8 | 6 | 5 | 3 | 2 |

== Series standings ==
| Position | Driver | No. | Car | Competitor / Team | San | Win | Que | Phi | Syd | Penalty | Total |
| 1 | Liam McAdam | 38 | Holden VZ Commodore | Eggleston Motorsport | 119 | 83 | 90 | 143 | 140 | 0 | 575 |
| 2 | Alex Rullo | 62 | Ford BF Falcon | Performance West | 15 | 130 | 143 | 95 | 122 | 0 | 505 |
| 3 | Steve Briffa | 8 | Holden VZ Commodore | Poco.com.au | 50 | 109 | 76 | 73 | 71 | 0 | 379 |
| 4 | Jim Pollicina | 7 | Holden VZ Commodore | Poll Performance / Mocomm | 103 | 60 | 81 | 55 | 73 | 0 | 372 |
| 5 | Steven Devjak | 88 | Ford BF Falcon | Douglas Barry Specials | 49 | 67 | 62 | 81 | 65 | 0 | 324 |
| 6 | Matthew Palmer | 48 | Ford BF Falcon | STR Truck Bodies | 81 | 40 | 73 | 39 | 81 | 0 | 314 |
| 7 | Chris Smerdon | 39 | Ford BA Falcon | Vectra Corp/Lubrimaxx | 79 | 68 | 60 | 34 | 64 | 0 | 305 |
| 8 | Tony Evangelou | 6 | Ford BF Falcon | 501 Performance | 0 | 76 | 0 | 113 | 54 | 0 | 243 |
| 9 | Jake Kostecki | 56 | Ford BF Falcon | Arcoplate/Penrite Oils | 47 | 54 | 54 | 55 | 0 | 0 | 210 |
| 10 | Jason Heck | 5 | Ford BF Falcon | JCH Electrical | 35 | 35 | 40 | 34 | 61 | 0 | 205 |
| 11 | Michael Hector | 49 | Ford BF Falcon | Image Racing | 59 | 49 | 0 | 80 | 0 | 0 | 188 |
| 12 | John Vergotis | 12 | Ford BA Falcon | JCV Automotive | 36 | 45 | 21 | 40 | 33 | 0 | 175 |
| 13 | Jack Perkins | 54 | Holden VZ Commodore | Eggleston Motorsport | 143 | 0 | 0 | 0 | 0 | 0 | 143 |
| 14 | Brendan Strong | 75 | Holden VZ Commodore | Strong Excavations / Kirra Automotive | 37 | 28 | 45 | 0 | 27 | 0 | 137 |
| 15 | Chris Delfsma | 21 | Ford BF Falcon | Century 21 Hazelbrook | 42 | 48 | 30 | 0 | 0 | 0 | 120 |
| 16 | Leigh Moran | 16 | Ford BA Falcon | Image Racing / Lubrimaxx | 0 | 26 | 0 | 31 | 0 | 0 | 57 |
| 17 | Lyle Kearns | 57 | Holden VZ Commodore | DG Engineering / Precise Precut | 0 | 0 | 15 | 40 | 0 | 0 | 55 |
| 18 | Scott Loadsman | 9 | Ford BA Falcon | Steve Briffa Racing | 0 | 0 | 39 | 0 | 0 | 0 | 39 |
| 19 | Jason Leoncini | 45 | Holden VZ Commodore | SA Racing Logistics / THR Developments | 37 | 0 | 0 | 0 | 0 | 0 | 37 |
| 20 | Darrin Renouf | 15 | Holden VS Commodore | Enviropress | 0 | 0 | 0 | 0 | 21 | 0 | 21 |
| | Pro | | | | | | | | | | |
| Position | Driver | No. | Car | Competitor / Team | San | Win | Que | Phi | Syd | Penalty | Total |
| 1 | Liam McAdam | 38 | Holden VZ Commodore | Eggleston Motorsport | 123 | 80 | 117 | 143 | 140 | 0 | 603 |
| 2 | Alex Rullo | 62 | Ford BF Falcon | Performance West | 35 | 130 | 141 | 108 | 123 | 0 | 537 |
| 3 | Chris Smerdon | 39 | Ford BA Falcon | Vectra Corp/Lubrimaxx | 101 | 105 | 115 | 50 | 99 | 0 | 470 |
| 4 | Tony Evangelou | 6 | Ford BF Falcon | 501 Performance | 0 | 87 | 0 | 113 | 78 | 0 | 278 |
| 5 | Michael Hector | 49 | Ford BF Falcon | Image Racing | 95 | 91 | 0 | 58 | 0 | 0 | 244 |
| 6 | Leigh Moran | 16 | Ford BA Falcon | Image Racing / Lubrimaxx | 0 | 78 | 0 | 84 | 0 | 0 | 162 |
| 7 | Jack Perkins | 54 | Holden VZ Commodore | Eggleston Motorsport | 140 | 0 | 0 | 0 | 0 | 0 | 140 |
| 8 | Jason Leoncini | 45 | Holden VZ Commodore | SA Racing Logistics / THR Developments | 84 | 0 | 0 | 0 | 0 | 0 | 84 |
| | Privateer | | | | | | | | | | |
| Position | Driver | No. | Car | Competitor / Team | San | Win | Que | Phi | Syd | Penalty | Total |
| 1 | Jim Pollicina | 7 | Holden VZ Commodore | Poll Performance / Mocomm | 135 | 95 | 101 | 103 | 107 | 0 | 541 |
| 2 | Steve Briffa | 8 | Holden VZ Commodore | Poco.com.au | 66 | 140 | 95 | 113 | 101 | 0 | 515 |
| 3 | Steven Devjak | 88 | Ford BF Falcon | Douglas Barry Specials | 81 | 95 | 80 | 120 | 89 | 0 | 465 |
| 4 | Matthew Palmer | 48 | Ford BF Falcon | STR Truck Bodies | 116 | 67 | 87 | 67 | 57 | 0 | 394 |
| 5 | Jason Heck | 5 | Ford BF Falcon | JCH Electrical | 58 | 58 | 54 | 64 | 81 | 0 | 315 |
| 6 | Jake Kostecki | 56 | Ford BF Falcon | Arcoplate/Penrite Oils | 81 | 70 | 70 | 84 | 0 | 0 | 305 |
| 7 | John Vergotis | 12 | Ford BA Falcon | JCV Automotive | 66 | 76 | 32 | 74 | 55 | 0 | 303 |
| 8 | Brendan Strong | 75 | Holden VZ Commodore | Strong Excavations / Kirra Automotive | 64 | 53 | 63 | 0 | 35 | 0 | 215 |
| 9 | Chris Delfsma | 21 | Ford BF Falcon | Century 21 Hazelbrook | 77 | 78 | 41 | 0 | 0 | 0 | 196 |
| 10 | Lyle Kearns | 57 | Holden VZ Commodore | DG Engineering / Precise Precut | 0 | 0 | 20 | 74 | 0 | 0 | 94 |
| 11 | Scott Loadsman | 9 | Ford BA Falcon | Steve Briffa Racing | 0 | 0 | 52 | 0 | 0 | 0 | 52 |
| 12 | Darrin Renouf | 15 | Holden VS Commodore | Enviropress | 0 | 0 | 0 | 0 | 35 | 0 | 35 |
| 13 | Peter Rullo | 26 | Ford BF Falcon | Performance West | 0 | 23 | 0 | 0 | 0 | 0 | 23 |
