= 2016 Kumho Tyres Australian V8 Touring Car Series =

Australian motorsport series for V8 cars

2016 V8 Touring Car National Series

Seasons
- ← 2015 2017 →

The 2016 Kumho Tyres Australian V8 Touring Car Series is the 9th running of the series. Defending champion Liam McAdam moved to the V8 Supercars Dunlop Series for 2016.

== Team and drivers ==
Team	Car	No.	Driver	Rounds
Kustom Workz / Supercar Parts	Ford BF Falcon	4	Shane Hunt	3-4
Haymans Virginia / JCH Electrical	Ford BF Falcon	5	Jason Heck	1-3
501 Performance	Ford BF Falcon	6	David Wright	2
MoComm Motorsport Communications	Holden VE Commodore	7	Jim Pollicina	1-4
Poco / Simons Earthwork	Holden VZ Commodore	8	Steve Briffa	1,3-4
Kenwood Homes	Ford BF Falcon	11	Michael Anderson	1,3-4
Edge Designer Homes	Ford BF Falcon	13	Tyler Greenbury	1
Image Racing / Lubrimaxx	Ford FG Falcon	13	Tyler Greenbury	2-3
Image Racing / Lubrimaxx	Ford BF Falcon	13	Tyler Greenbury	4
Image Racing / Lubrimaxx	Ford BA Falcon	16	Leigh Moran	1–2,4
Brad Jones Racing	Holden VE Commodore	14	Josh Smith	All
Car Advice / Penrite	Holden VE Commodore	15	Emily Duggan	1
Newton Motorsport / Petwell Engineering	Ford EL Falcon	17	Troy Stapleton	2,4
Unichip Dynomotive	Holden VE Commodore	18	Jack Sipp	1
Unichip Dynomotive	Holden VE Commodore	66	Jack Sipp	2-4
Cavalier Homes	Ford BA Falcon	18	Matt Chahda	2
Wake Up/Side Bar	Holden VZ Commodore	18	Warren Millett	3-4
Savs Auto Electric / Westco Automotive	Holden VE Commodore	25	Sam Morabito	1
Savs Auto Electric / Westco Automotive	Holden VE Commodore	25	Dean Vovacevich	2-4
MW Motorsport	Ford FG Falcon	26	Garry Jacobson	4-5
Tempest Solutions Air & Mechanical	Holden VE Commodore	37	Anthony Loscialpo	1-2
Tempest Solutions Air & Mechanical	Holden VE Commodore	37	Michael Caine	3
Vectra Corp / Lubrimaxx	Ford FG Falcon	39	Chris Smerdon	All
SA Racing Logistics / THR Developments	Holden VE Commodore	45	Taz Douglas	All
BSTRONG ELECTRICAL / Kirra Automotive	Holden VZ Commodore	75	Brendan Strong	1-3
WARLORD / Simon's Earthworks	Holden VZ Commodore	88	Simon Emerzidis	All
Custom Garage	Ford EL Falcon	111	Andy Cantrell	3

== Race calendar ==
The series is being contested over five rounds with three races at each round.

Round	Circuit	City / state	Date	Winning driver(s)
1	(Victoria (state)) Sandown Raceway	Melbourne, Victoria	1–3 April	Taz Douglas
2	(Victoria (state)) Winton Motor Raceway	Winton, Victoria	20–22 May	Taz Douglas
3	Queensland Raceway	Ipswich, Queensland	22–24 July	Taz Douglas
4	(Victoria (state)) Phillip Island Grand Prix Circuit	Phillip Island, Victoria	9–11 September	Garry Jacobson
5	(New South Wales) Sydney Motorsport Park	Sydney, New South Wales	28–30 October	Garry Jacobson

== Series standings ==
Pos.	Driver	SAN (Victoria (state))			WIN (Victoria (state))			QLD (Queensland)			PHI (Victoria (state))			SMP (New South Wales)			Pts.
1	Taz Douglas	1	1	1	1	1	1	1	1	1	4	3	4	5	5	3	598
2	Tyler Greenbury	7	3	3	3	2	3	2	Ret	2	2	2	2	3	7	4	496
3	Josh Smith	NC	7	5	2	3	2	4	6	5	3	4	3	2	1	2	489
4	Jim Pollicina	5	4	6	11	4	12	5	2	3	5	5	5	6	10	10	353
5	Chris Smerdon	2	6	4	4	5	Ret	2	3	4	6	6	10	8	8	12	337
6	Garry Jacobson										1	1	1	1	2	1	281
7	Michael Anderson	6	9	Ret	5	Ret	6	6	4	8	Ret	7	6	4	3	7	277
8	Jack Sipp	9	12	10	8	10	7	11	9	11	7	8	Ret	10	6	8	209
9	Simon Emerzidis	11	15	12	10	14	10	7	12	Ret	8	9	7	14	15	15	172
10	Dean Kovacevich				13	9	13	13	10	10	13	11	9				137
11	Warren Millett							8	11	12	9	10	11	16	12	13	114
12	Brendan Strong	8	10	9	9	7	9	12	8	DNS				Ret	Ret	Ret	113
13	Steve Briffa	3	8	7				EXC	EXC	7	Ret	Ret	Ret	12	17	Ret	113
14	Jason Heck	4	5	8	6	6	Ret	Ret	DNS	DNS							100
15	Anthony Loscialpo	Ret	13	14	12	8	8										96
16	Shane Hunt							10	5	9	12	Ret	8	Ret	14	Ret	93
17	Bryce Fullwood	DNS	2	2													88
18	Tony Evangelou													7	4	5	79
19	Michael Caine							Ret	Ret	6				11	11	9	70
20	Leigh Moran	12	14	13	15	13	Ret				11	13	14				67
21	Troy Stapleton				14	12	11				10	12	12				65
22	David Wright				7	11	5										62
23	Jon McCorkindale													9	9	6	56
24	Mark Primmer										14	14	13	15	16	14	48
25	Matt Chahda				Ret	DNS	4										41
26	Isidoro Ambrosio													13	13	11	31
27	Andy Cantrell							9	Ret	13							25
28	Sam Morabito	10	11	Ret													16
29	Emily Duggan	Ret	Ret	11													15
30	Garry Mennell													Ret	18	16	11
