= 2008 Shannons V8 Touring Car National Series =

Motor racing competition

2008 Super3 Series

Seasons
- ← none 2009 →

The Shannons V8 Touring Car National Series was an Australian touring car series held for V8 Supercars. It was the inaugural running of the V8 Touring Car National Series, a third-tier series for V8 Supercars. The season began on 17 May 2008 at the Mallala Motor Sport Park and finished on 30 November at Sandown Raceway. The season consisted of four rounds, held across three different states.

The series was won by Chris Smerdon who was the only driver to finish all twelve races, but also won eight races. He finished 130 points ahead of Steve Ingwersen who was the only other driver to attend all four rounds.

== Teams and drivers ==
The following teams and drivers have competed during the 2008 Shannons V8 Touring Car National Series.

Manufacturer	Car	Team	No	Driver	Rounds
Ford	Falcon (EL)	Image Racing	18	(Australia) Leigh Moran	3–4
Ford	Falcon (AU)	Image Racing	50	(Australia) Mark Sheppard	3
Ford	Falcon (AU)	JCV Automotive Katoomba	26	(Australia) John Vergotis	1–2, 4
Ford	Falcon (AU)	Challenge Motorsport	39	(Australia) Chris Smerdon	All
Holden	Commodore (VT)	Peter McNiven	13	(Australia) Peter McNiven	3
Holden	Commodore (VS)	Steve Ingwersen Painting	15	(Australia) Steve Ingwersen	All
Holden	Commodore (VX)	Warrin Mining	62	(Australia) Adam Wallis	1, 4
Holden	Commodore (VX)	Power Plus 98	98	(Australia) Darren Formosa	3

== Race calendar ==
Round	Date	Circuit	Location	Winning driver
1	17–18 May	(South Australia) Mallala Motor Sport Park	Mallala, South Australia	(Australia) Adam Wallis
2	12–13 July	(New South Wales) Eastern Creek Raceway	Sydney, New South Wales	(Australia) Chris Smerdon
3	9–10 August	(Victoria (state)) Phillip Island Grand Prix Circuit	Phillip Island, Victoria	(Australia) Chris Smerdon
4	29–30 November	(Victoria (state)) Sandown Raceway	Melbourne, Victoria	(Australia) Chris Smerdon

== Results and standings ==
The season consisted of four rounds held across three different states. Each round consisted of three races.

Position	1st	2nd	3rd	4th	5th	Fast Lap
Points	50	45	41	38	35	1

=== Drivers championship ===
Pos	Driver	(South Australia) MAL			(New South Wales) EAS			(Victoria (state)) PHI			(Victoria (state)) SAN			Pts
Pos	Driver	R1	R2	R3	R1	R2	R3	R1	R2	R3	R1	R2	R3	Pts
1	(Australia) Chris Smerdon	2	3	1	1	2	1	1	1	5	1	1	1	571
2	(Australia) Steve Ingwersen	4	4	4	3	3	2	Ret	2	4	4	3	4	441
3	(Australia) John Vergotis	3	2	3	2	1	Ret				3	2	3	349
4	(Australia) Adam Wallis	1	1	2							2	Ret	2	240
5	(Australia) Leigh Moran							5	4	3	Ret	4	5	187
6	(Australia) Mark Sheppard							3	3	2				127
7	(Australia) Peter McNiven							4	DNS	1				89
8	(Australia) Darren Formosa							2	DNS	DNS				45
Pos	Driver	R1	R2	R3	R1	R2	R3	R1	R2	R3	R1	R2	R3	Pts
Pos	Driver	(South Australia) MAL			(New South Wales) EAS			(Victoria (state)) PHI			(Victoria (state)) SAN			Pts

Colour	Result
Gold	Winner
Silver	Second place
Bronze	Third place
Green	Points classification
Blue	Non-points classification
Blue	Non-classified finish (NC)
Purple	Retired, not classified (Ret)
Red	Did not qualify (DNQ)
Red	Did not pre-qualify (DNPQ)
Black	Disqualified (DSQ)
White	Did not start (DNS)
White	Withdrew (WD)
White	Race cancelled (C)
Blank	Did not practice (DNP)
Blank	Did not arrive (DNA)
Blank	Excluded (EX)

== See also ==
- 2008 V8 Supercar season
