= Super3 Series =

Australian motor racing series

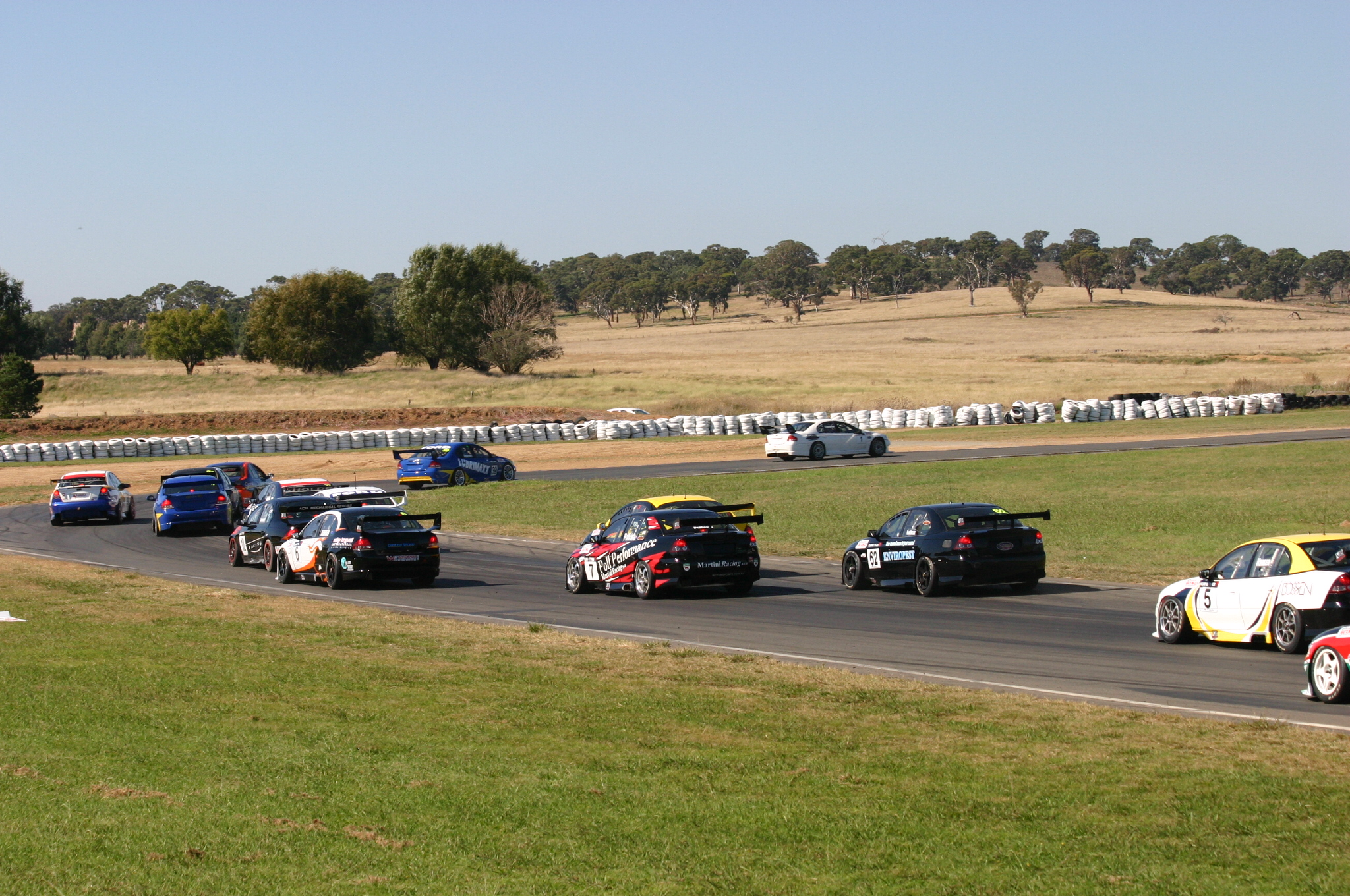
- Category: Touring car racing
- Country: Australia
- Inaugural season: 2008
- Folded: 2024
- Drivers: Super3 Series: 6 V8 Touring Car Series: 13
- Teams: Super3 Series: 5 V8 Touring Car Series: 15
- Constructors: Super3 Series: (Australia) Holden (Australia) Ford (Japan) Nissan V8 Touring Car Series: (Australia) Holden (Australia) Ford
- Tyre suppliers: Super3 Series: Dunlop Tyres V8 Touring Car Series: Kumho Tyres
- Last Drivers' champion: Super3 Series: (Australia) Cody Burcher V8 Touring Car Series: (Australia) Jude Bargwanna
- Last Teams' champion: Super3 Series: (Australia) MW Motorsport V8 Touring Car Series: (Australia) Anderson Motorsport
- Official website: Supercars.com; V8 Touring Cars Series

The Super3 Series & V8 Touring Car Series (formerly the Kumho Tyres Super3 Series, Kumho Tyres Australian V8 Touring Car Series and V8 Touring Car National Series) were two Australian motor racing competitions for touring cars. In 2019 it became the official third tier series for Supercars competitors, while the series itself remained independently owned and managed from Supercars. The cars must be deregistered cars from official Supercar teams and series, this is mainly as a preventive measure against a team building a brand new car to suit the regulations. In 2023 the V8 Touring Car Series would be revived to create a standalone unofficial fourth tier level V8 Supercars category however it would only last for that year's season. The two defunct series were known by the commercial identities of the Dunlop Super3 Series & Kumho Tyres Australian V8 Touring Car Series.

== History ==
The series came into existence as an acknowledgement that there are many old V8 Supercars no longer eligible or competitive in the second-tier Dunlop V8 Supercar Series and, other than as overweight and uncompetitive Sports Sedans, had nowhere else to race. The series has also attracted competitors from the now defunct Australian Touring Car Challenge which had run on the now collapsed Australian Motor Racing Championships program.

The inaugural series was held in 2008 as a completely new category, running on the Shannons Nationals Motor Racing Championships schedule. The series struggled to find a grid in its opening year, with the low point coming in the second round at Eastern Creek where just three cars were entered. The series has since swollen with the deregistration of the Ford AU Falcon and Holden VX Commodore from the Fujitsu V8 Supercar Series, with a number of fresh cars and teams stepping straight out of the second-tier series.

Chris Smerdon, a former V8 Supercar driver, was the inaugural series champion, dominating the 2008 series in an ex-Stone Brothers Racing Ford AU Falcon. The 2009 series saw former Fujitsu Series drivers Adam Wallis and Terry Wyhoon battle with Smerdon for the crown, with Wallis coming out on top over Wyhoon and Smerdon. Another former Fujitsu Series driver, Tony Evangelou, won the 2010 series, being the only driver to compete in all five rounds. Wyhoon won the series in 2011 after a close battle with Smerdon and Scott Loadsman.

In 2019, the series was rebranded to Super3.

In 2020, only two rounds of the series were completed - therefore no champion was awarded.

In 2021 the Super3 Series sat to join alongside the Dunlop Super2 Series for the first time as a class.

In 2023, Car of the Future also known later as New Generation V8 Supercar built cars were set to become eligible in the Super3 Series class of the Dunlop Super2 & Super3 Series alongside Project Blueprint built specification cars purchased from teams in the Super2 Series Class of the Dunlop Super2 & Super3 Series. In the same year of 2023 the V8 Touring Car Series would be revived to create a standalone unofficial fourth tier V8 Supercars category for Pre-Car of The Future Specification built cars to be eligible. However it would only last for that years season in 2023.

In November 2024, Supercars announced the Super3 Series would cease to exist as a stand alone series due to low grid numbers with only as many as two or three cars appearing in the Super3 Series class at rounds in the 2024 Dunlop Super2 & Super3 Series season. Cars built under Car of the Future (Also known as New Generation V8 Supercar) regulations are set to be re-eligible to compete in the Super2 Series in the 2025 year season.

== Format ==
Each weekend consist of two races, the first usually held on Saturday and the second on Sunday. To score points, the driver must complete at least 75% of the race distance and must cross the finish line at the completion of the race. At least 50% of the planned race distance must be completed for the result to be valid and championship points awarded.

Position	1st	2nd	3rd	4th	5th	6th	7th	8th	9th	10th	11th	12th	13th	14th	15th	16th	17th
Points	150	138	129	120	111	102	96	90	84	78	72	69	66	63	60	57	54

== Series winners ==
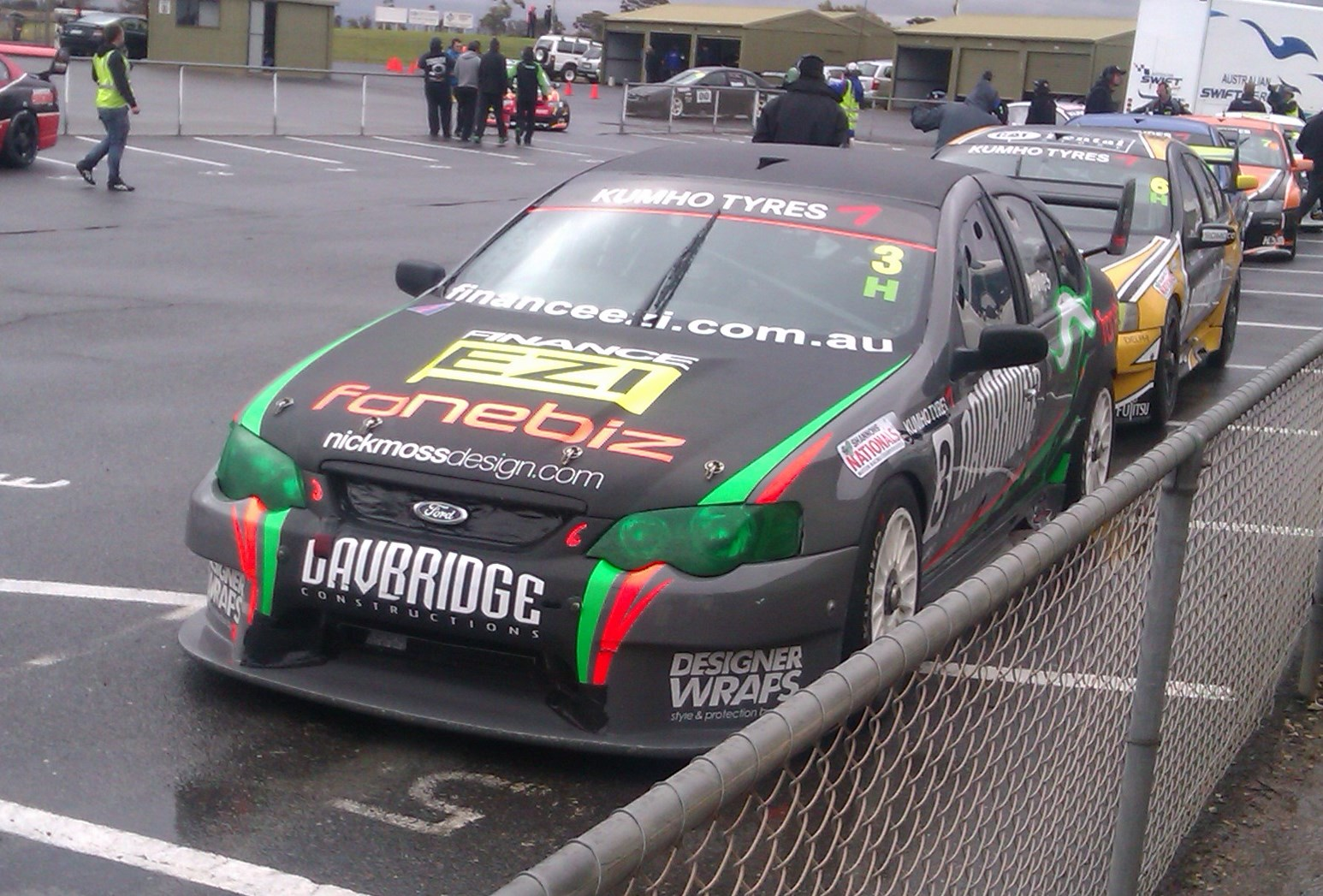
Shae Davies won the 2013 series driving a Ford BF Falcon

Australian V8 Touring Car Series
Year	Driver	Car	Team
2008	Chris Smerdon	Ford AU Falcon	Challenge Motorsport
2009	Adam Wallis	Holden VX Commodore	Warrin Mining
2010	Tony Evangelou	Ford BA Falcon	ANT Racing
2011	Terry Wyhoon	Ford BA Falcon	Image Racing
2012	Josh Hunter	Ford BA Falcon	Fernandez Motorsport
2013	Shae Davies	Ford BF Falcon	Fernandez Motorsport
2014	Justin Ruggier	Holden VZ Commodore	Eggleston Motorsport
2015	Liam McAdam	Holden VZ Commodore	Eggleston Motorsport
2016	Taz Douglas	Holden VE Commodore	THR Racing Developments
2017	Jack Smith	Holden VE Commodore	Brad Jones Racing
2018	Tyler Everingham	Ford FG Falcon	MW Motorsport
2019 - 2022	Not contested		
2023	Jude Bargwanna	Ford FG Falcon	Anderson Motorsport

Super3 Series
Year	Driver	Car	Team
2019	Broc Feeney	Ford FG Falcon	Paul Morris Motorsport
2020	Not awarded		
2021	Nash Morris	Ford FG Falcon	Paul Morris Motorsport
2022	Brad Vaughan	Ford FG Falcon	Anderson Motorsport
2023	Jobe Stewart	Holden VF Commodore	Image Racing
2024	Cody Burcher	Nissan Altima	MW Motorsport
