= 2012 Kumho Tyres V8 Touring Car Series =

Australian motor racing series

2012 Super3 Series

Seasons
- ← 2011 2013 →

The 2012 Kumho Tyres V8 Touring Car Series is an Australian motor racing series for V8 Touring Cars, which are de-registered and superseded former V8 Supercars. Although the series utilised cars built for V8 Supercar racing, it is not an official V8 Supercar series.

It is the fifth running of the V8 Touring Car National Series. The series took place on the program of Shannons Nationals Motor Racing Championships events. It began at Eastern Creek Raceway on 9 March and finished at Sandown Raceway on 23 November after six meetings held in New South Wales, Victoria, Queensland and South Australia.

== Calendar ==
| Rd. | Circuit | Location | Date | Winner |
|---|---|---|---|---|
| 1 | Eastern Creek Raceway | Sydney, New South Wales | 9–11 March | Joshua Hunter |
| 2 | Mallala Motor Sport Park | Mallala, South Australia | 13–15 April | Chris Smerdon |
| 3 | Winton Motor Raceway | Benalla, Victoria | 22–24 June | Joshua Hunter |
| 4 | Queensland Raceway | Ipswich, Queensland | 10–12 August | Morgan Haber |
| 5 | Phillip Island Grand Prix Circuit | Phillip Island, Victoria | 21–23 September | Joshua Hunter |
| 6 | Sandown Raceway | Melbourne, Victoria | 23–25 November | Joshua Hunter |

== Points System ==
| Position | 1st | 2nd | 3rd | 4th | 5th | 6th | 7th | 8th | 9th | 10th | 11th | 12th | 13th | 14th | 15th | 16th | 17th | 18th | 19th | 20th |
| Qualifying | 3 | | | | | | | | | | | | | | | | | | | |
| Races 1 & 2 | 40 | 35 | 31 | 27 | 23 | 20 | 17 | 15 | 13 | 11 | 10 | 9 | 8 | 7 | 6 | 5 | 4 | 3 | 2 | 1 |
| Races 3 | 60 | 53 | 47 | 41 | 35 | 30 | 26 | 23 | 20 | 17 | 15 | 14 | 12 | 11 | 9 | 8 | 6 | 5 | 3 | 2 |

In a change from the 2011 season, the points available for the third race at each event was increased by approximately 50%, while the top ten "Time Attack" single lap points session was abandoned.

== Teams and drivers ==
The following teams and drivers competed in the 2012 Kumho Tyres V8 Touring Car Series.

| Team | No | Driver | Car |
|---|---|---|---|
| Fernandez Motorsport | 3 | Joshua Hunter | Ford BA Falcon |
| Fernandez Motorsport | 10 | Maurice Pickering | Ford BA Falcon |
| Forpark Australia | 5 | Matthew Hansen | Holden VZ Commodore |
| Garioch Racing | 6 | Nathan Garioch | Holden VZ Commodore |
| Garioch Racing | 23 | Justin Garioch | Ford BA Falcon |
| Poll Performance | 7 | Jim Pollicina | Holden VZ Commodore |
| Vendetta Tyres/Vengeance Wheels | 13 | Robert Jane | Ford BA Falcon |
| Bowden Homes | 15 | Shawn Jamieson | Holden VZ Commodore |
| Kustom Workz | 17 | Shane Hunt | Ford AU Falcon |
| SA Tractor | 22 | Dean Kovacevich | Holden VZ Commodore |
| Image Racing | 25 | Michael Hector | Ford BA Falcon |
| Image Racing | 39 | Chris Smerdon | Ford BA Falcon |
| Image Racing | 50 | Mark Shepherd | Ford BA Falcon |
| MW Motorsport | 28 | Morgan Haber | Ford BA Falcon |
| Premium Showers and Robes | 46 | Paul Pennisi | Holden VY Commodore |
| IR Yeing Transport | 51 | Ian Yeing | Holden VZ Commodore |
| Loadsman Racing Team | 62 | Scott Loadsman | Holden VZ Commodore |
| Cavalier Homes Barossa | 81 | Michael Bartsch | Ford BA Falcon |
| MacArthur Truckserve | 98 | Aaron Tebb | Holden VY Commodore |

== See also ==
2012 V8 Supercar season
