= 2011 Kumho V8 Touring Car Series =

Australian motor racing series

2011 Super3 Series

Seasons
- ← 2010 2012 →

The 2011 Kumho V8 Touring Car Series was an Australian motor racing series for V8 Touring Cars, which are de-registered and superseded former V8 Supercars. Although the series utilised cars built for V8 Supercar racing, it was not an official V8 Supercar series.

It was the fourth running of the V8 Touring Car National Series. The series took place on the program of Shannons Nationals Motor Racing Championships events. It began at Wakefield Park on 1 April and finished at Phillip Island Grand Prix Circuit on 6 November after five meetings held in New South Wales, Victoria and South Australia.

Terry Wyhoon, driving a Ford Falcon, won the series by 72 points, having won ten of the fifteen races and two of the five rounds. Scott Loadsman finished second, 117 points ahead of Chris Smerdon who led the series after four rounds but was disqualified from Sandown for eligibility problems. Justin Garioch finished fourth despite missing a round, 31 points behind Smerdon and 13 points ahead of Jim Pollicina in fifth.

== Calendar ==
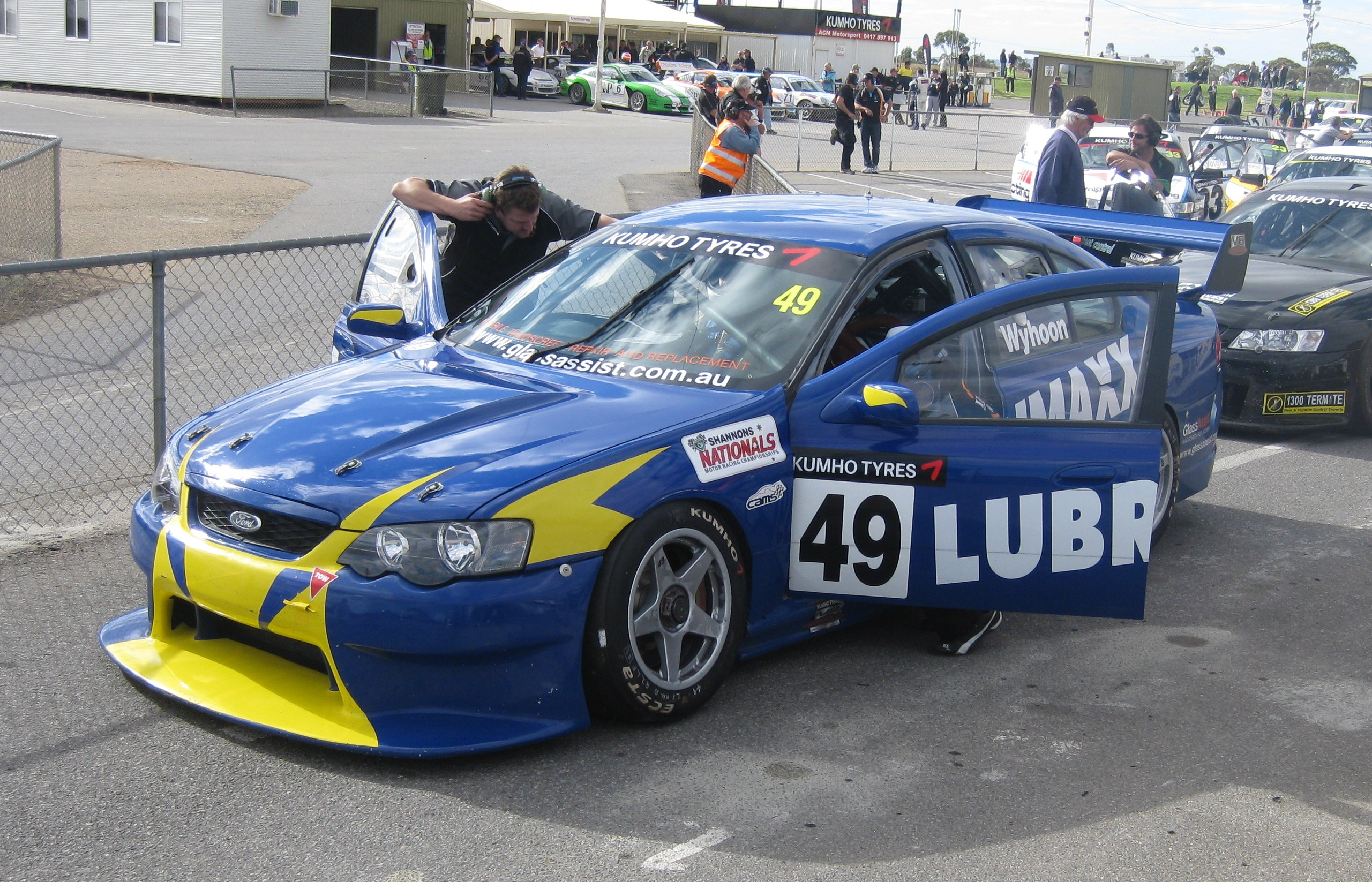
Terry Wyhoon (Ford BA Falcon) was the winner of the 2011 Kumho V8 Touring Car Series

The 2011 Kumho V8 Touring Car Series was contested over five rounds held across three states.

Rd.	Circuit	Location	Date	Winner
1	Wakefield Park	Goulburn, New South Wales	1–3 April	Scott Loadsman
2	Mallala Motor Sport Park	Mallala, South Australia	13–15 May	Chris Smerdon
3	Eastern Creek Raceway	Sydney, New South Wales	15–17 July	Terry Wyhoon
4	Sandown Raceway	Melbourne, Victoria	9–11 September	Scott Loadsman
5	Phillip Island Grand Prix Circuit	Phillip Island, Victoria	4–6 November	Terry Wyhoon

== Points System ==
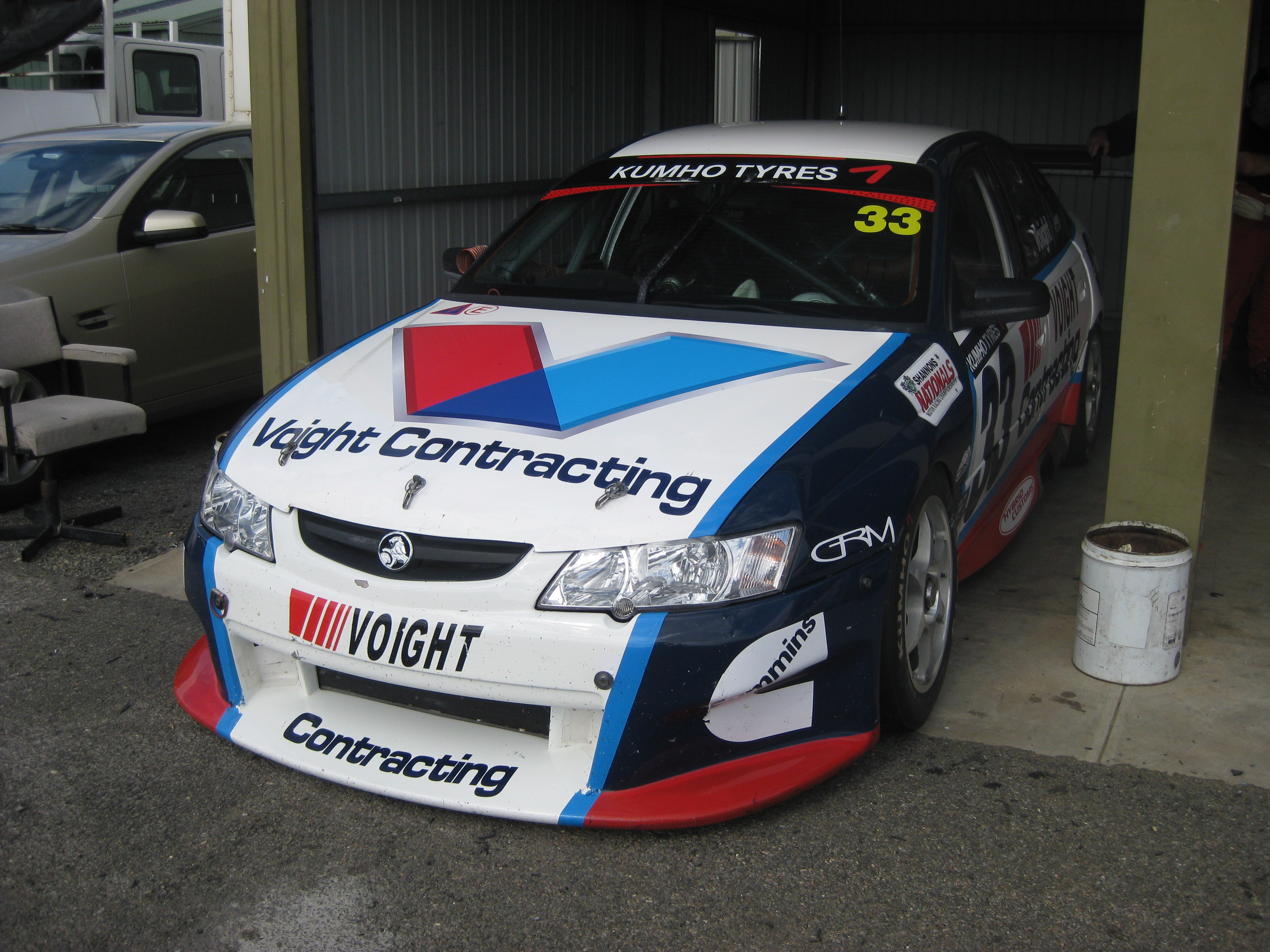
Steven Voight (Holden VY Commodore) placed 8th in the series

The following points system was used for 2011:

Position	1st	2nd	3rd	4th	5th	6th	7th	8th	9th	10th	11th	12th	13th	14th	15th	16th	17th	18th	19th	20th
Qualifying	3																			
Time Attack	10	9	8	7	6	5	4	3	2	1										
Races	40	35	31	27	23	20	17	15	13	11	10	9	8	7	6	5	4	3	2	1

The only change from 2010 was that "Time Attack" was formalised for the ten fastest qualifying cars only, with the pointscore beginning at ten points for fastest.

== Teams and drivers ==
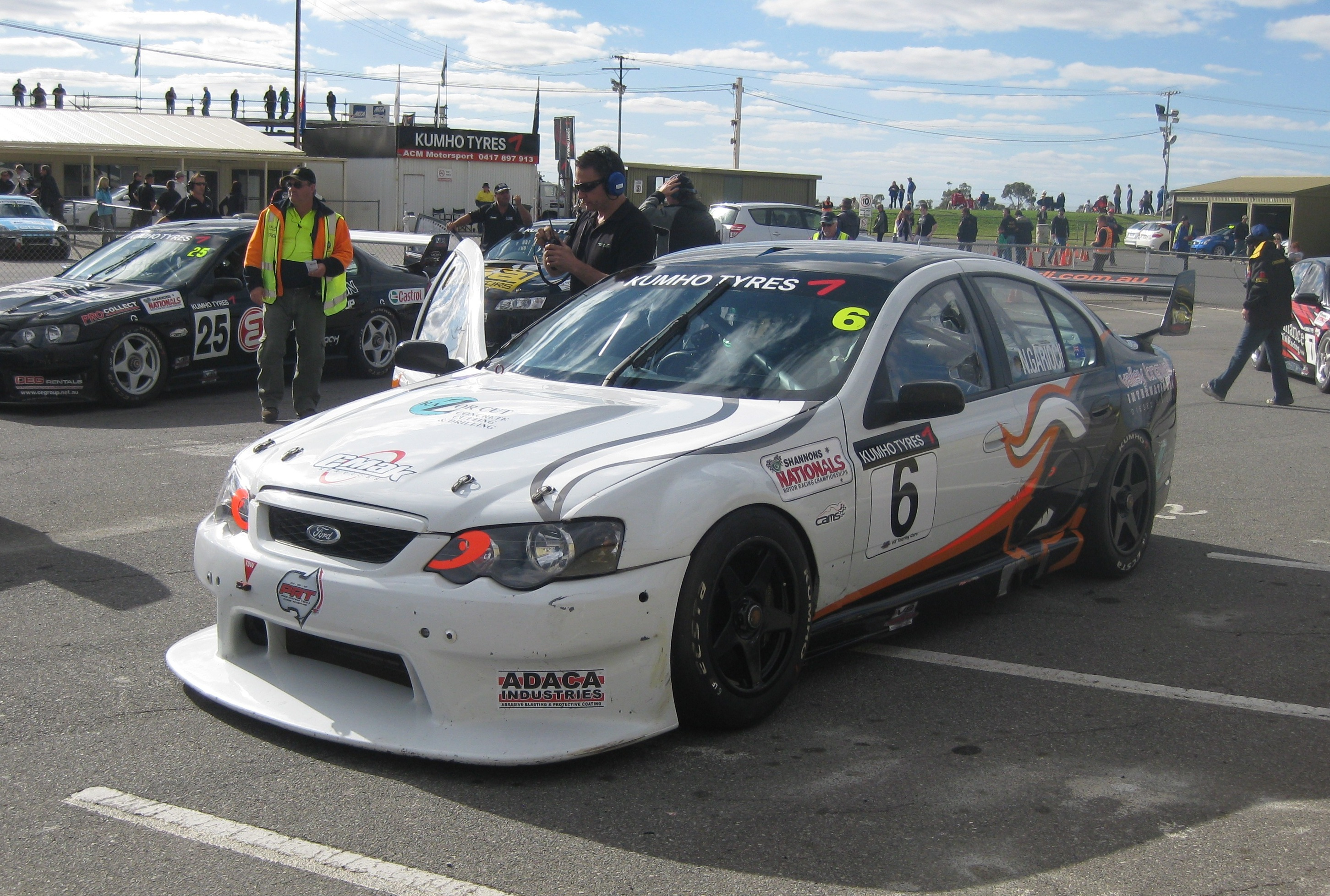
Nathan Garioch (Ford BA Falcon) placed 10th in the Series

The following teams and drivers competed in the 2011 Kumho V8 Touring Car Series.

Team	No	Driver	Car
ANT Racing	1	Tony Evangelou	Ford BA Falcon
Heinrich Performance	2	Bruce Heinrich	Ford AU Falcon
Australian Custom Moulders	5	Matthew Hansen	Holden VY Commodore
Valley Longwall International	6	Nathan Garioch	Ford BA Falcon
Valley Longwall International	23	Justin Garioch	Ford BA Falcon
Poll Performance	7	Jim Pollicina	Holden VY Commodore
Steve Ingwersen Painting	8	Steve Ingwersen	Holden VX Commodore
MrHDT Race Cars/Engines	11	Sean Fardell	Holden VX Commodore
Image Racing	12	Stuart Inwood	Ford AU Falcon
Image Racing	25	Michael Hector	Ford BA Falcon
Image Racing	49	Terry Wyhoon	Ford BA Falcon
Image Racing	50	Mark Shepherd	Ford BA Falcon
Morphett Vale Garage	15	Shawn Jamieson	Holden VY Commodore
Century 21 Hazelbrook	21	Chris Delfsma	Ford AU Falcon
SA Tractor	22	Isi Ambrosio	Holden VY Commodore
JCV Automotive	26	John Vergotis	Ford AU Falcon
Graham Body Works	27	Shaun Fennell	Holden VX Commodore
Derrick Hocking	31; 34	Derrick Hocking	Ford BA Falcon; Holden VY Commodore
Voight Contracting	33	Steven Voight; Aaron Tebb	Holden VY Commodore
Smerdon Racing	39	Chris Smerdon	Ford BA Falcon
Premium Showers and Robes	46	Paul Pennisi	Holden VY Commodore
Loadsman Racing Team	62	Scott Loadsman	Holden VY Commodore
Cavalier Homes Barossa	81	Michael Bartsch	Ford AU Falcon; Ford BA Falcon
MacArthur Truckserve	98	Aaron Tebb	Holden VY Commodore

== Driver standings ==
Pos	Driver	Round 1					Round 2					Round 3					Round 4					Round 5					Pts
Pos	Driver	Q	TA	1	2	3	Q	TA	1	2	3	Q	TA	1	2	3	Q	TA	1	2	3	Q	TA	1	2	3	Pts
1	Terry Wyhoon	2nd	1st	1st	5th	8th	DNS		3rd	1st	6th	2nd	2nd	1st	1st	1st	5th	5th	6th	1st	1st	2nd	1st	1st	1st	1st	544
2	Scott Loadsman	1st	7th	2nd	1st	3rd	3rd	2nd	4th	2nd	2nd	4th	1st	14th	6th	4th	2nd	1st	2nd	3rd	2nd	1st	2nd	2nd	3rd	Ret	472
3	Chris Smerdon	6th	6th	4th	3rd	2nd	1st	1st	1st	4th	1st	5th	4th	3rd	3rd	6th	DSQ	DSQ	DSQ	DSQ	DSQ	10th	7th	Ret	7th	4th	355
4	Justin Garioch	3rd	4th	3rd	4th	11th	4th	10th	5th	10th	Ret	1st	5th	4th	2nd	2nd						6th	4th	3rd	2nd	2nd	324
5	Jim Pollicina	4th	2nd	5th	9th	17th	6th	4th	6th	7th	5th	3rd	6th	2nd	13th	9th	8th	8th	4th	7th	3rd	12th		9th	5th	6th	311
6	Michael Bartsch	14th		11th	11th	7th	2nd	3rd	2nd	3rd	3rd	9th	7th	9th	9th	8th						3rd	3rd	4th	6th	10th	253
7	Matthew Hansen	11th		9th	13th	5th						7th	3rd	5th	5th	3rd	6th	4th	7th	6th	5th	8th	9th	6th	4th	Ret	246
8	Stephen Voight	9th	5th	6th	7th	4th	7th	6th	9th	9th	8th						9th	7th	8th	2nd	Ret						170
8	Mark Shepherd	7th	8th	10th	12th	15th	5th	7th	7th	5th	4th	6th	10th	Ret	EX	7th	10th		5th	12th	6th						170
10	Aaron Tebb	10th	DNS	19th	8th	Ret	9th	9th	10th	8th	7th	12th		8th	12th	Ret	7th	DNS	11th	5th	4th	14th		8th†	DNS	DNS	161
10	John Vergotis	8th	9th	7th	6th	Ret						11th		7th	7th	10th	DNS		9th	10th	8th	15th		11th	9th	8th	161
12	Nathan Garioch	13th		8th	14th	6th	8th	5th	8th	6th	Ret	8th	9th	6th	4th	5th						5th	6th	Ret	DNS	DNS	160
13	Michael Hector	17th		18th	17th	16th	DNS		14th	12th	11th	DNS		10th	10th	12th	11th		10th	11th	10th	11th		14th	8th	3rd	155
14	Bruce Heinrich																1st	2nd	3rd	4th	7th	7th	8th	5th	12th	5th	145
15	Shaun Fennell	DNS		DNS	DNS	DNS	11th		11th	11th	12th						3rd	3rd	1st	9th	Ret	9th	10th	15th	10th	7th	125
16	Chris Delfsma	12th		13th	15th	9th	10th	8th	13th	14th	9th	10th	8th	13th	8th	Ret						13th		7th	Ret	DNS	101
17	Tony Evangelou	5th	3rd	17th	2nd	1st																					87
18	Steve Ingwersen	16th		14th	16th	13th						13th		12th	11th	11th						16th		12th	11th	9th	81
19	Paul Pennisi											14th		11th	Ret	Ret	4th	6th	Ret	8th	9th	18th		10th	DNS	DNS	54
20	Stuart Inwood	19th		12th	10th	10th																					31
21	Isi Ambrosio						DNS		12th	13th	10th																28
22	Derrick Hocking	18th		15th	19th	12th						15th		DNS	DNS	DNS						17th		Ret	DNS	DNS	17
23	Sean Fardell	15th		16th	18th	14th																					15
24	Shawn Jamieson																					4th	5th	13th	Ret	DNS	14

Colour	Result
Gold	Winner
Silver	Second place
Bronze	Third place
Green	Points classification
Blue	Non-points classification
Blue	Non-classified finish (NC)
Purple	Retired, not classified (Ret)
Red	Did not qualify (DNQ)
Red	Did not pre-qualify (DNPQ)
Black	Disqualified (DSQ)
White	Did not start (DNS)
White	Withdrew (WD)
White	Race cancelled (C)
Blank	Did not practice (DNP)
Blank	Did not arrive (DNA)
Blank	Excluded (EX)

Q – Qualifying
TA – Time Attack

Notes:

† – During Race 1 of Round 5 at Phillip Island, Aaron Tebb's Holden Commodore made heavy contact with the wall with two laps to go, leading to the race being red flagged and the results backdated.

== See also ==
- 2011 V8 Supercar season
