= Shannons Nationals Motor Racing Championships =

Motor racing events in Australia

The Shannons Nationals Motor Racing Championships is a series of motor racing events held across five states of Australia. It was first held as the CAMS National Racing Championships in 2006 and adopted its present name the following year when it gained Shannons Insurance as a new partner.

The series brings a number of Australian racing categories together under one banner, allowing costs to be spread across a broad base. The four core categories represented are Australian Formula 3 (contesting the Australian Drivers' Championship), Saloon Cars (contesting the Australian Saloon Car Series), Australian Manufacturers' Championship (incorporating the Australian Production Car Championship) and Porsche GT3 Cup Challenge Australia. Other series supported are the Kerrick Sports Sedan Series, Kumho Tyres V8 Touring Car Series, Australian Superkart Championship, Formula Vee Series and Aussie Racing Cars.

The environment of the series has given some categories the opportunity to grow where opportunities might have been more limiting in higher profile events, while the pooling of resources across a number of categories has resulted in lower management costs and improved access to television recording facilities. Categories that contribute to the cost of the television coverage are screened, usually the following weekend, as part of the SBS Speedweek programme, which is broadcast initially on SBS and then repeated on Fox Sports. The Championships have also allowed several higher profile races to be established or re-established, including the Bathurst 12 Hour, the Tasmanian Super Prix, the Australian Tourist Trophy, the Clem Smith Trophy and the Pacific Superkart Challenge.

== Series Champions ==
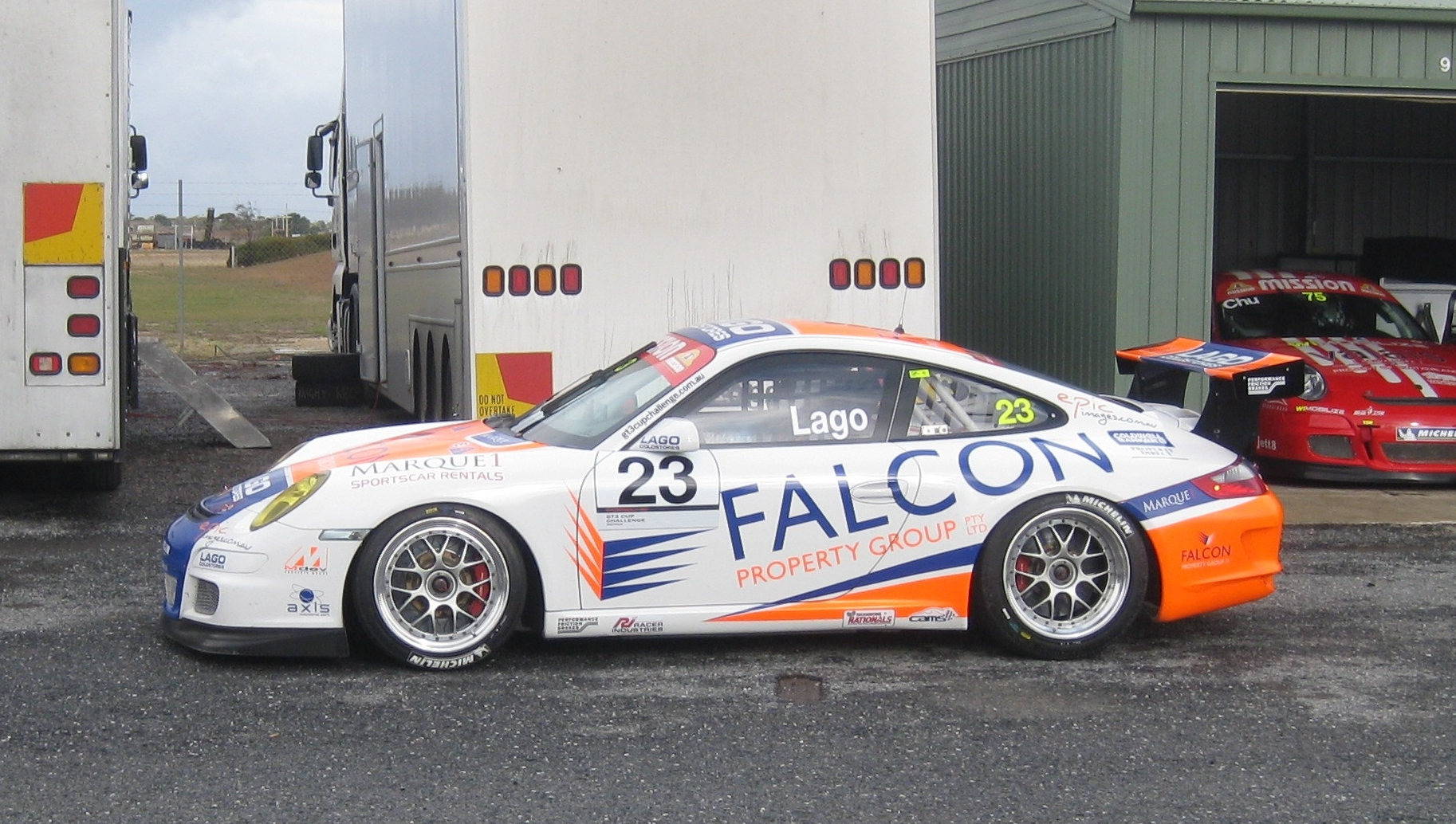
Roger Lago (Porsche 911 GT3 Cup Type 997), winner of the Porsche GT3 Cup Challenge in 2010 and 2011

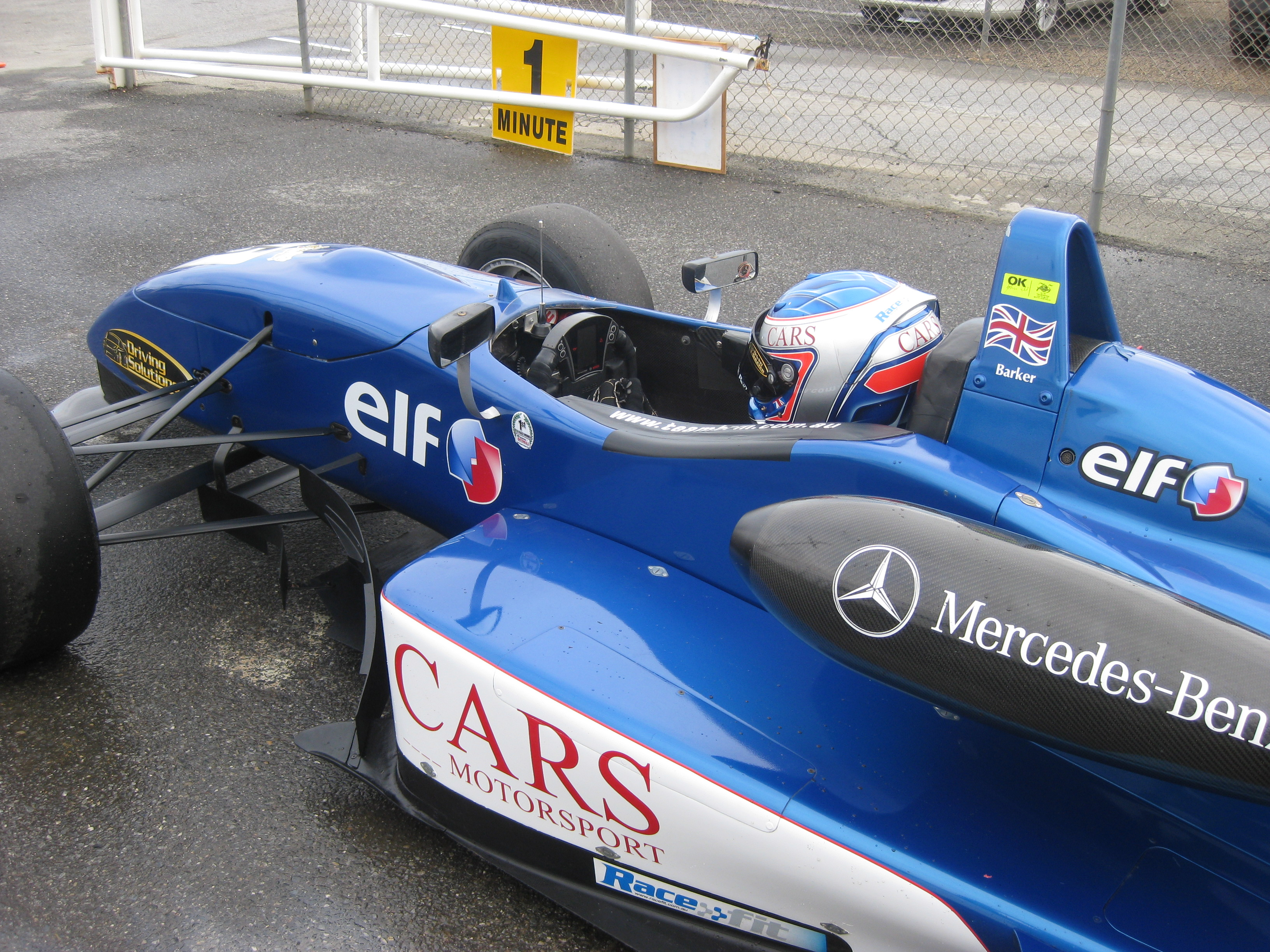
Englishman Ben Barker (Dallara F307), winner of the 2010 Australian Drivers' Championship.

Year	Series	Champion	Car
2010	Australian Drivers' Championship	Ben Barker	Dallara F307 HWA-Mercedes
2010	Commodore Cup	Adam Beechey	Holden VS Commodore
2010	Australian Manufacturers' Championship	Mitsubishi	Mitsubishi Lancer Evo X
2010	Australian Production Car Championship	Stuart Kostera	Mitsubishi Lancer Evo X
2010	Australian Saloon Car Series	Tim Rowse	Holden VT Commodore
2010	Porsche GT3 Cup Challenge	Roger Lago	Porsche 911 GT3 Cup Type 997
2010	Kerrick Sports Sedan Series	James Sera	Saab 9-3-Chevrolet
2010	Shannons V8 Touring Car National Series	Tony Evangelou	Ford BA Falcon
2010	Formula Vee National Series	Benjamin Porter	Checkmate JP02
2010	Australian Superkart Championship	Darren Hossack	Anderson Maverick SAFE
2011	Australian Drivers' Championship	Chris Gilmour	Dallara F307 HWA-Mercedes
2011	Commodore Cup	Adam Beechey	Holden VS Commodore
2011	Australian Manufacturers' Championship	Mitsubishi	Mitsubishi Lancer Evo X
2011	Australian Production Car Championship	Stuart Kostera	Mitsubishi Lancer Evo X
2011	Australian Saloon Car Series	Matt Lovell	Ford AU Falcon
2011	Porsche GT3 Cup Challenge	Roger Lago	Porsche 911 GT3 Cup Type 997
2011	Kerrick Sports Sedan Series	Tony Ricciardello	Alfa Romeo Alfetta GTV-Chevrolet
2011	Kumho V8 Touring Car National Series	Terry Wyhoon	Ford BA Falcon
2011	Australian Suzuki Swift Series	Allan Jarvis	Suzuki Swift Sport RS
2011	Australian Superkart Championship	Warren McIlveen	Stockman MR2 - Honda
2012	Australian Drivers' Championship	James Winslow	Dallara F307 HWA-Mercedes
2012	Commodore Cup	Adam Beechey	Holden VS Commodore
2012	Australian Manufacturers' Championship	Mitsubishi	Mitsubishi Lancer Evo X
2012	Australian Production Car Championship	Stuart Kostera	Mitsubishi Lancer Evo X
2012	Australian Saloon Car Series	Simon Tabinor	Holden VT Commodore
2012	Porsche GT3 Cup Challenge	Kane Rose	Porsche 911 GT3 Cup Type 997
2012	Kerrick Sports Sedan Series	Kerry Baily	Aston Martin DBR9-Chevrolet
2012	Kumho V8 Touring Car National Series	Josh Hunter	Ford BA Falcon
2012	Australian Suzuki Swift Series	Allan Jarvis	Suzuki Swift Sport RS
2012	Australian Superkart Championship	Jason Smith	Anderson-DEA
2012	Radical Australia Cup	Neale Muston	Radical SR3
