= 1961 Australian Touring Car Championship =

Motor racing competition

Seasons
- ← 1960 1962 →

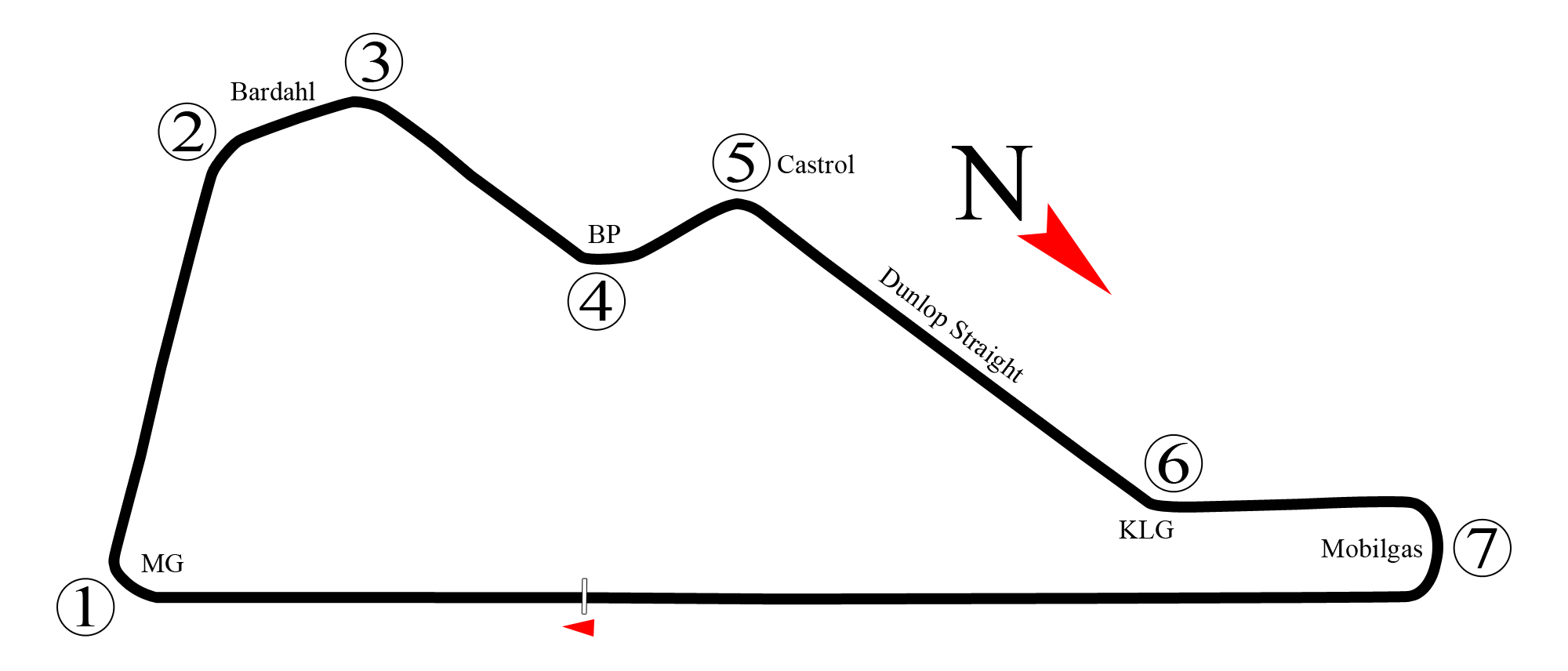
Layout of the Lowood Airfield Circuit (1946-1966)

The 1961 Australian Touring Car Championship was a CAMS sanctioned Australian motor racing title for drivers of Appendix J Touring Cars. The championship, which was contested over a single, 50 mile (82 km) race at the Lowood Airfield Circuit in Queensland on 3 September 1961, was the second Australian Touring Car Championship. The race, which was promoted by the Queensland Racing Drivers' Club, was won by Bill Pitt, driving a Jaguar Mark 1 3.4.

== Race overview ==
As in 1960, the event was dominated by Jaguar drivers. Ian Geoghegan took pole position ahead of Bill Pitt and Ron Hodgson, while Bob Jane and Bill Burns completed a top five lockout for Jaguar. Bob Holden was fastest of the non-Jaguar drivers in practice, more than eleven seconds slower than Burns.

Jane made a good start and was alongside Geoghegan heading into the first corner, but Geoghegan held on and led Hodgson, Pitt and Jane around for the first lap. Pitt attempted to pass Hodgson in the back section of the circuit but was unable to complete the move. Geoghegan led by 2.5 seconds at the end of the first lap, with Hodgson holding a similar margin back to Pitt in third. Jane and Burns were further back, while Holden and Cecil Keid led the battle for sixth ahead of Barry Gibson, Muir Daniel, Ken Brigden, Noel Trees, Des West, Roy Sawyer and Viv Eddy. Jane retired on lap 2 after a rear spring mount broke.

Geoghegan continued to build his lead over Hodgson, extending it to around six seconds by the end of lap 3 and setting a new lap record of 2:04.7 on lap 2, before Hodgson went off at the first corner, allowing Pitt into second place. Pitt quickly closed in on Geoghegan, setting another lap record of 2:03.7, before passing him for the lead on lap 5. Geoghegan began suffering from clutch slip and dropped back, as did Hodgson who had both overdrive and brake problems.

Sawyer retired on lap 7 with brake dramas and Gibson went out of the race as well on the following lap. West and Trees then went out on consecutive laps. By this stage, Pitt had a lead of more than 40 seconds and went on to an easy victory over Geoghegan and Hodgson. Burns completed a Jaguar top four while Holden was the first non-Jaguar in fifth. Keid had been running sixth until dropping back on the second last lap to seventh, allowing Daniel into sixth place. The top ten was rounded out by Brigden, Eddy and J.D. Sherman.

Geoghegan would go on to win five Australian Touring Car Championships during the 1960s, while Hodgson would achieve success as a team owner when Bob Morris won the 1979 title.

== Race results ==
Pos.	No.	Driver	Entrant	Car	Class	Class Pos.	Laps	Time/Retired
1	34	(Australia) Bill Pitt	Mrs DI Anderson	Jaguar Mark 1 3.4	2601-3500cc	1	18	38:20.7
2	5	(Australia) Ian Geoghegan	Geoghegan Motors Liverpool	Jaguar Mark 1 3.4			18	
3	69	(Australia) Ron Hodgson	Strathfield Motors Pty Ltd	Jaguar Mark 2 3.8	Over 3500cc	1	18	
4		(Australia) Bill Burns	W Burns	Jaguar Mark 1 3.4				
5	113	(Australia) Bob Holden		Holden FJ	2001-2600cc	1		
6		(Australia) Muir Daniel		Austin A105				
7	32	(Australia) Cecil Keid		Holden FJ				
8	63	(Australia) Ken Brigden		Peugeot 403	1301-1600cc	1		
9	12	(Australia) Viv Eddy		Morris 850	Up to 1000cc	1		
10	77	(Australia) J. D. Sherman		Ford XK Falcon				
11		(Australia) J. Whalen		Morris Minor 1000				
12		(Australia) T. Uren		Peugeot 203				
Ret	8	(Australia) Noel Trees		Morris 850			13	
Ret	1	(Australia) Des West	Geoghegan Motors	Morris 850			12	
Ret		(Australia) Barry Gibson		Ford Zephyr			7	
Ret	26	(Australia) Roy Sawyer		Ford Anglia 105E			6	Brakes
Ret	7	(Australia) Bob Jane		Jaguar Mark 2 3.8			1	Suspension

== Statistics ==
- Pole position: Ian Geoghegan, 2:03.1
- Fastest lap: Bill Pitt, 2:03.7 (new lap record)
- Race distance: 18 laps, 81.72 km
- Average speed: 127.87 km/h
