= 1983 Australian GT Championship =

Motor racing competition

Seasons
- ← 1982 1984 →

The 1983 Australian GT Championship was a CAMS sanctioned Australian motor racing title for cars complying with Group D regulations for GT cars, with Group B Sports Sedans competing by invitation. It was the sixth Australian GT Championship. The championship was won by Rusty French, driving a Porsche 935.

== Championship review ==
1982 Australian GT Championship winner Alan Jones moved back to Formula One in 1983 and did not defend his title. His main opposition from 1982 returned, including, Rusty French in the ex-Jones Porsche 935 sponsored by John Sands, along with new team-mate Alan Browne in the ex-French 935. Twice former Australian Sports Sedan Champion Tony Edmondson fronted again in the Don Elliot owned, 5.0L Chevrolet powered, Alfa Romeo Alfetta GTV (upgraded to a 6.0L Chev during the year), while touring car driver Peter Brock again was to drive the Bob Jane owned 6.0L Chevrolet Monza. Also competing were the Frank Gardner run JPS Team BMW with Jim Richards driving the team's turbocharged BMW 318i that had originally been driven by Allan Grice, Adelaide based John Briggs who had sold his Monza and was running an ex-JPS BMW 318i, and Peter Fitzgerald in his 3.2L Naturally aspirated Porsche Carrera RSR. The expected challenge from the twin-turbo Chevrolet V8 powered Mercedes-Benz 450 SLC of Bryan Thompson failed to eventuate until late in the series as the car was plagued by unreliability.

The third round of the championship at the Adelaide International Raceway was the scene of a start line accident after the Chevrolet Monza of Peter Brock snapped left off the line and speared into the concrete wall before bouncing back in front of the field. With nowhere to go and little time to react, others, led by Jim Richards crashed into Brock, with the ex-Jim Richards Ford Falcon of Tony Hubbard ending up on top of the pile and the Jaguar XJS of Queensland's Mark Trenoweth on the bottom. Reports varied from the Jane camp about the cause of the crash. Peter Brock maintained that the car had broken a CV joint while chief mechanic Pat Purcell believed the cause was actually Brock just losing control when the car found sudden grip, claiming that nothing had broken on the car before the crash. At least one third of the field was eliminated in the crash. Following the accident, neither the Monza nor the JPS BMW were raced until November at the 1983 Australian Grand Prix at Calder Park in Melbourne in the Sports Car / GT Challenge support races.

Rusty French won his first Australian GT Championship with a consistent run over the six round series to score 40 points, never finishing outside of the top three positions in any round and winning Round 3 in Adelaide and the sixth and final round at Surfers Paradise. He was also the only driver in the entire field who finished (or entered) every round of the series. Jim Richards finished second in the championship with 18 points, despite competing in only the first two rounds at Lakeside and Sandown, winning both convincingly, though he was challenged by French at Sandown who used the superior power of his Porsche to stay with the BMW on Sandown's long straights. The 1980 and 1981 Australian Sports Sedan Champion Tony Edmondson finished equal second with Richards in the championship. Like Richards, Edmondson won two rounds with victory at Round 4 at Calder and Round 5 at Winton. Unlike Richards, Edmondson did enter other rounds of the championship. His was one of the cars damaged in the start line crash at the Adelaide round. Alan Browne was classified fourth in the championship in Rusty French's old Porsche 935, the 935/77 model, scoring 13 points. Browne unfairly copped blame for the start crash in Adelaide where it was suggested he hit the Brock Monza in the back causing Brock to lose control, though video evidence showed that the Porsche only hit the Monza after Brock had already lost control.

As a reward for driving his Porsche 935 to the championship win, French was flown to West Germany in 1984 by Porsche as one of their award winners for 1983. This also secured him a drive with German World Endurance Championship team Kremer Racing at the 1984 24 Hours of Le Mans driving a Porsche 956B. Alongside Englishmen Tiff Needell and David Sutherland, French finished 9th outright in the 24-hour classic.

== Schedule ==
Round	Circuit	Date	Format	Race winners	Round winner	Car	Report
1	Lakeside International Raceway	10 April	One race	Jim Richards	Jim Richards	BMW 318i Turbo	
2	Sandown Raceway	17 April	Two heats	Jim Richards; Jim Richards	Jim Richards	BMW 318i Turbo	
3	Adelaide International Raceway	10 July	One race	Rusty French	Rusty French	Porsche 935/80	
4	Calder Park Raceway	31 July	Two heats	Rusty French; Tony Edmonson	Tony Edmonson	Alfa Romeo Alfetta GTV Chevrolet	
5	Winton Motor Raceway	14 August	Two heats	Tony Edmonson; Tony Edmonson	Tony Edmonson	Alfa Romeo Alfetta GTV Chevrolet	
6	Surfers Paradise Raceway	28 August	Two heats	Rusty French; Rusty French	Rusty French	Porsche 935/80	

== Points system ==
Points were awarded on a 9-6-4-3-2-1 basis for the first six places at each round. All rounds were counted towards the championship.

== Results ==
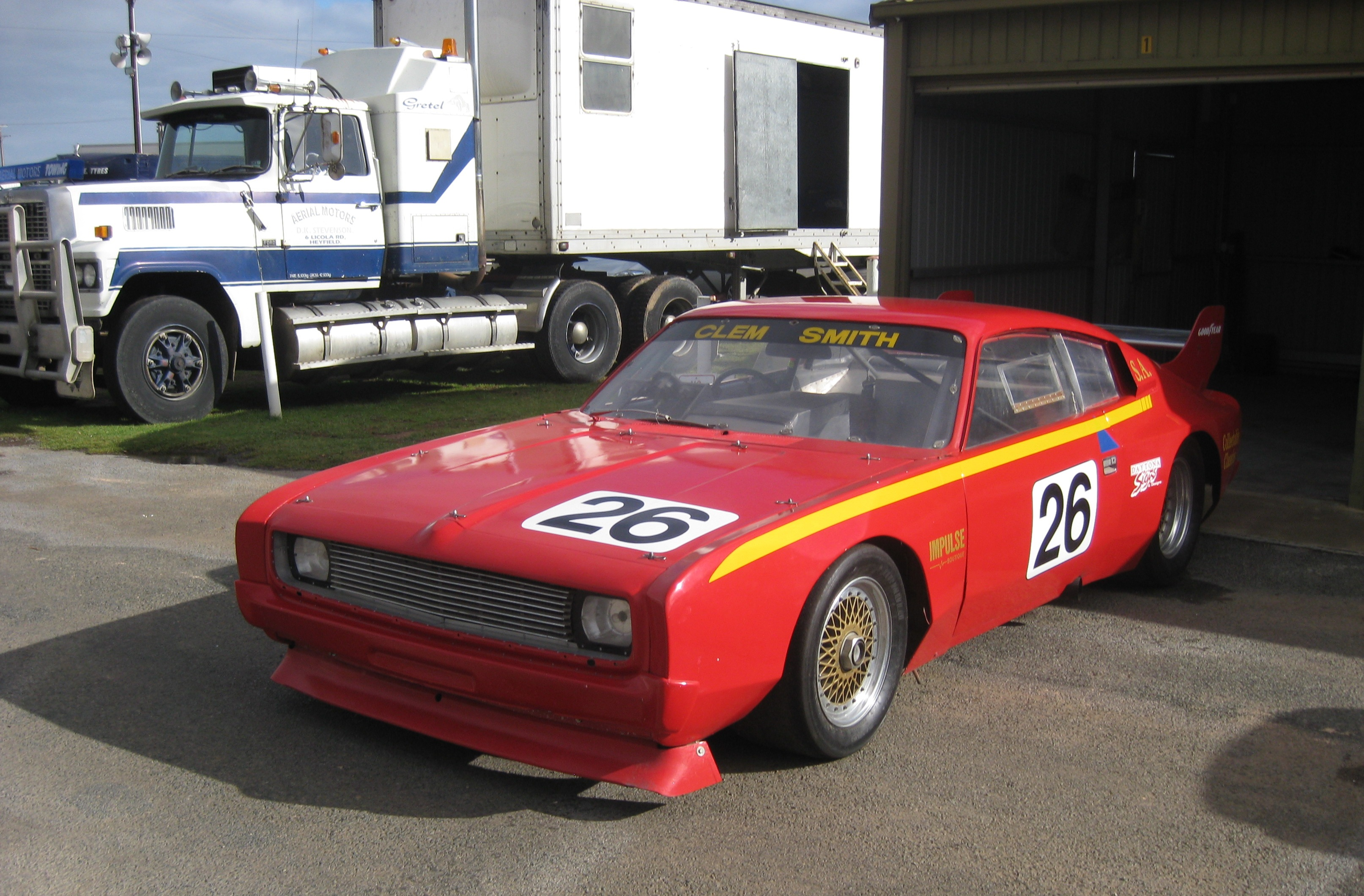
The Chrysler Valiant Charger of Clem Smith on display at Mallala Motor Sport Park in 2010.

Pos.	Driver	No.	Car	Entrant	Lak	San	Ade	Cal	Win	Sur	Total
1	Rusty French	3	Porsche 935	John Sands Racing	6	6	9	4	6	9	40
2	Jim Richards	11	BMW 318i Turbo	JPS Team BMW	9	9	-	-	-	-	18
2	Tony Edmondson	9	Alfa Romeo Alfetta GTV - Chevrolet	Don Elliot	-	-	-	9	9	-	18
4	Alan Browne	4	Porsche 935	John Sands Racing	-	4	-	2	3	4	13
5	Peter Fitzgerald	5	Porsche Carrera RSR	Peter Fitzgerald	-	3	-	3	4	-	10
5	John Briggs	91	BMW 318i Turbo	John Briggs BMW	-	-	4	-	-	6	10
7	Bryan Thompson	17	Mercedes-Benz 450 SLC – Chevrolet	PF Motor Racing Pty Ltd	-	-	6	-	-	-	6
7	Colin Bond	28	Porsche 944 Turbo	Porsche Cars Australia	-	-	-	6	-	-	6
9	Bruce Lynton	18	BMW 318i Turbo	Bruce Lynton BMW	4	-	-	-	-	-	4
9	Phillip Swinton	97	Mini Cooper		2	-	-	-	-	2	4
9	Bob Jolly	31	Holden VC Commodore	Bob Jolly Racing	-	2	-	-	2	-	4
9	Clem Smith	26	Chrysler VH Valiant Charger	Clem Smith	-	-	3	1	-	-	4
13	Jeff Barnes	9	Chevrolet Monza		3	-	-	-	-	-	3
13	Mark Trenoweth	18	Jaguar XJS	Mark Trenoweth	-	-	-	-	-	3	3
15	John Lusty	43	Holden LJ Torana		-	-	2	-	-	-	2
16	Bruce Smith	32	Ford Capri		1	-	-	-	-	-	1
16	Jim Keogh	12	Holden VH Commodore		-	1	-	-	-	-	1
16	Larry Kogge	41	Mazda RX-3	ASSA	-	-	1	-	-	-	1
16	John Bourke	77	Toyota Celica		-	-	-	-	1	-	1
16	Simon Harrex	69	Holden VH Commodore		-	-	-	-	-	1	1
