= 1963 Australian Touring Car Championship =

Motor racing competition

Seasons
- ← 1962 1964 →

The 1963 Australian Touring Car Championship was a CAMS sanctioned motor racing title for drivers of Appendix J Touring Cars. It was contested over a single 25 lap, 50 mile (80 km) race at the Mallala Race Circuit in South Australia on 15 April 1963 and was the fourth running of the Australian Touring Car Championship. The race was won by Bob Jane, driving a Jaguar Mark 2 4.1.

== Race ==
Much of the interest in the 1963 title centred on an anticipated duel between Bob Jane's much developed Jaguar Mark 2 and Norm Beechey's new Chevrolet Impala. The confrontation failed to eventuate after the Impala blew its engine the previous weekend and was a non-starter. Beechey raced his backup car, a Holden 48-215. Jane took pole position by one tenth of a second over the Valiant of Ern Abbott, with Clem Smith's Valiant another second behind. The second row comprised the Holden of Clive Millis and the Fiat 1500 of Pat James.

Beechey retired on lap 1 after starting sixth, while Jane led from Abbott, Smith, Peter Manton, John Brindley, James, Harry Firth, George Reynolds and Richard Thurston. Jane set a new lap record of 1:57.2 on lap 2 as he extended his lead, while Firth passed James, Brindley and Manton to move into fourth place by lap 7. Abbott was able to stay with Jane as the two pulled away from Smith in third, who was ten seconds behind at half distance. Both Valiant drivers then encountered problems: Abbott's brakes began to fade and he fell back into the clutches of Smith, but Smith was low on fuel and had to conserve. Firth also had problems, with a bent throttle linkage putting him under pressure from Manton. Manton attempted to pass Firth at the last corner but was unable to take the place.

Jane went on to become the fourth and final Jaguar driver to win an Australian Touring Car Championship, leading Abbott home by seven seconds, with Smith a further 22 seconds adrift. Firth finished one lap down in fourth ahead of Manton, Millis and Reynolds.

1963 also saw the first New Zealander to compete in the Australian Touring Car Championship – Car #64, an Austin A90 driven by Christopher Roskilly.

== Results ==
Class winners are indicated by bold text.

Pos.	Driver	No.	Car	Entrant	Class	Laps	Time/Retired
1	(Australia) Bob Jane	71	Jaguar Mark 2 4.1	R. Jane	Over 3500cc	25	50:03.2
2	(Australia) Ern Abbott	99	Chrysler Valiant R Series	E. Abbott Car Sales	Over 3500cc	25	+7.0
3	(Australia) Clem Smith	46	Chrysler Valiant R Series	C. Smith Motors	Over 3500cc	25	+28.7
4	(Australia) Harry Firth	111	Ford Consul Cortina Mark I	Ford Motor Co	1301–1600cc	24	+1 lap
5	(Australia) Peter Manton	59	Morris Cooper	P. Manton Motors	Up to 1000cc	24	+1 lap
6	(Australia) Clive Millis	87	Holden	Merlyn Motors	2001–2600cc	24	+1 lap
7	(Australia) George Reynolds	49	Volkswagen	G. Reynolds	1001–1300cc	24	+1 lap
8	(Australia) Gavin Baillieu	112	Morris Cooper	H. Firth	Up to 1000cc	23	+2 laps
9	(Australia) Pat James	78	Fiat 1500	Motor Improvements	1301–1600cc	23	+2 laps
10	(Australia) Cyril Nancarrow	30	Austin A90 Westminster	C.G. Nancarrow	2601–3500cc	23	+2 laps
11	(Australia) B. Murphy	70	Holden	B. Murphy	2001–2600cc	23	+2 laps
12	(Australia) L. Callaway	56	Morris Cooper	O'Callaghan Motors	Up to 1000cc	23	+2 laps
13	(Australia) W. Wauchope	57	Morris Cooper	J.W. Taylor's	Up to 1000cc	23	+2 laps
14	(Australia) Ken Virgin	50	Volkswagen	K. Virgin	1001–1300cc	23	+2 laps
15	(Australia) Dave Sullivan	36	Holden 48/215	D. Sullivan Motors	2001–2600cc	23	+2 laps
16	(Australia) R. Brown	35	Simca Aronde	B.J. Auto Service	1001–1300cc	23	+2 laps
17	(Australia) D. Dix	60	Holden	D. Dix	2001–2600cc	23	+2 laps
18	(Australia) W. Nalder	92	Hillman Minx	W. Nalder	1301–1600cc	22	+3 laps
19	(Australia) John Brindley	69	Holden 48/215	Car World	2001–2600cc	22	+3 laps
20	(Australia) Wally Wilson	114	Citroën ID19	Team SAAS	1601–2000cc	22	+3 laps
Ret	(Australia) N. Webb	62	Morris 850	C&S Motors	Up to 1000cc	17	
Ret	(Australia) Terry Sully	73	Hillman Minx	T. F. Sully	1301–1600cc	17	
Ret	(Australia) Richard Thurston	58	Morris 850	R.K. Thurston	Up to 1000cc	16	
Ret	(Australia) B. Forbes	85	Holden	Forcars Pty Ltd	2001–2600cc	11	
Ret	(Australia) V. Clancy	82	Holden	V. Clancy	2001–2600cc	7	
Ret	(Australia) Brian Sampson	79	Austin Lancer	Motor Improvements	1301–1600cc	4	
Ret	(New Zealand) Christoper (Nigel) Roskilly	64	Austin A90 Westminster	C. N. Roskilly	2601–3500cc	3	
Ret	(Australia) R. Loader	39	Holden	R. Loader	2001–2600cc	3	
Ret	(Australia) Norm Beechey	74	Holden 48-215		2001–2600cc	0	

== Statistics ==
- Attendance: More than 14,000
- Pole position: Bob Jane, 1:57.9
- Fastest lap: Bob Jane, 1:57.2
- Race distance: 25 laps, 84.50 km
- Average speed: 101.27 km/h
