= 1962 Australian Touring Car Championship =

Motor racing competition

Seasons
- ← 1961 1963 →

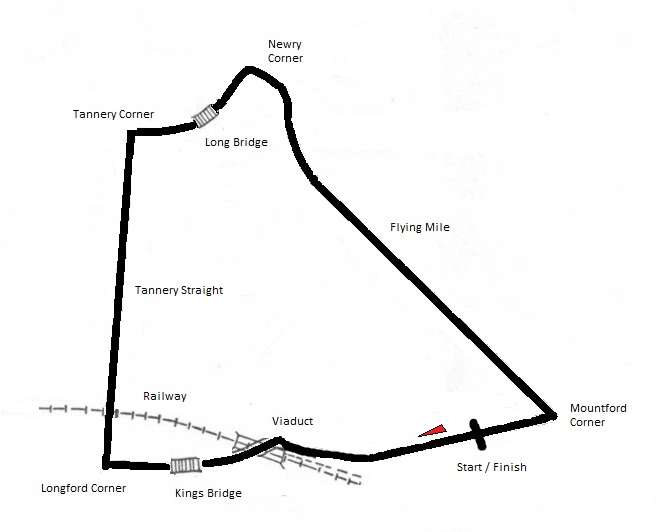
Layout of the Longford Circuit (1953–1968)

The 1962 Australian Touring Car Championship was a CAMS sanctioned Australian motor racing title for Appendix J Touring Cars. It was contested as a single race, staged at the Longford Circuit, in Tasmania, Australia, on 3 March 1962. The title, which was the third Australian Touring Car Championship, was won by Bob Jane, driving a Jaguar Mark 2 3.8.

== Classes ==
Cars competed in six engine capacity classes:

- Under 1000cc
- 1000–1600cc
- 1600–2000cc
- 2000–2600cc
- 2600–3500cc
- Over 3500cc

There were no entries in the 1600–2000cc class.

== Race ==
Jaguars continued their domination of the championship in 1962. Four were entered for the event, though Ian Geoghegan was forced to withdraw his after breaking a rear axle during practice. This left the Jaguars of Bob Jane, defending champion Bill Pitt and Bill Burns to take the front row of the grid. Norm Beechey had entered a Chevrolet Impala but was unable to attend Longford.

Jane led away from the start with Pitt in pursuit. However, Pitt suffered an overdrive problem during the race which allowed Jane to take an easy win, while Burns completed the podium. West was running in fourth during the final lap, but a burned piston meant he had to limp to the finish. He was passed by Brigden, who then went straight ahead at the final corner with fading brakes. West retook fourth heading onto pit straight but Brigden was able to turn around and repass West in the final 400 metres. Ross Farmer finished sixth ahead of Bob Holden, Peter Manton, who had made contact with a lapped car and pitted to check for damage, and George Maguire, the last finisher.

The domination of the Jaguars was proven in the speeds taken from the flying-eighth: Jane was recorded at 134 mph while West and Brigden only managed 117 and 106 mph respectively.

== Results ==
Class winners are indicated by bold text.

Pos.	Driver	No.	Car	Entant	Class	Laps	Time/Retired
1	(Australia) Bob Jane	7	Jaguar Mark 2 3.8	Autoland P/L	Over 3500cc	15	47:48.2
2	(Australia) Bill Pitt	34	Jaguar Mark 1 3.4	Mrs. D. I. Anderson	2600–3500cc	15	+23.8
3	(Australia) Bill Burns	134	Jaguar Mark 1 3.4	Bill Burns Hire Cars	2600–3500cc	15	+2:27.8
4	(Australia) Ken Brigden	63	Peugeot 403	Killara Motor Garage	1000–1600cc	14	+1 lap
5	(Australia) Des West	27	Holden 48-215	D. L. West	2000–2600cc	14	+1 lap
6	(Australia) Ross Farmer	70	Holden FJ	R. Farmer	2000–2600cc	13	+2 laps
7	(Australia) Bob Holden	64	Peugeot 403	Killara Motor Garage	1000–1600cc	19	+2 laps
8	(Australia) Peter Manton	55	Morris Cooper	Monaro Motors	Under 1000cc	12	+3 laps
9	(Australia) George Maguire	72	Hillman	G. T. McGuire	1000–1600cc	8	+7 laps
Ret	(Australia) D. Marshall	17	Morris 850	D. Marshall	Under 1000cc	9	
Ret	(Australia) Brian Higgins	75	Holden FJ	Brian Higgins	2000–2600cc	7	
Ret	(Australia) Frank Manley	32	Holden FE	F. Manley	2000–2600cc	4	
Ret	(Australia) L. Barrett		Vauxhall Cresta			4	
Ret	(Australia) John Hodgman		Hillman			4	
DNS	(Australia) Ian Geoghegan	5	Jaguar Mark 1 3.4	Geoghegan Motors	2600–3500cc		

== Statistics ==
- Pole position: Bob Jane
- Fastest lap: Bob Jane, 3:07.1
- Race distance: 15 laps, 108.60 km
- Average speed: 136.31 km/h
