= 1982 Australian GT Championship =

Motor racing competition

Seasons
- ← 1963 1983 →

The 1982 Australian GT Championship was a CAMS sanctioned Australian motor racing title open to Group D GT cars and Group B Sports Sedans. It was the fifth Australian GT Championship, the first to be awarded since 1963 and the first to be contested over a series of races rather than a single race. The GT championship replaced the Australian Sports Sedan Championship which had been awarded annually from 1976 to 1981. The 1982 title, which was contested over a nine-round series from 16 May to 10 October, was won by Alan Jones driving a Porsche 935/80 entered by Porsche Cars Australia.

The championship was dominated by 1980 Formula One World Drivers' Champion Alan Jones who went through the season undefeated. His closest on-track rival was multiple Bathurst winner and former Australian Touring Car Champion Peter Brock, driving a Bob Jane owned 6.0L V8 Chevrolet Monza. Brock placed fifth in the championship, having contested four of the nine rounds. Brock and the Monza were often faster in qualifying than the turbocharged Porsche. However, he was rarely able to maintain his tyres for the entire race duration and subsequently always finished second best. Although Alan Jones won every round, his battles with Peter Brock are regarded by those who witnessed it as some of the closest and best racing seen to that point in Australian motor racing history.

Rusty French placed second in the championship driving a Porsche 935/77A, 45 points behind Jones. Jones' Porsche Cars Australia teammate Colin Bond placed third driving a turbocharged Porsche 944 (the car Jones was to originally drive in the series before it was decided he would have a better chance in the 935), with the 1981 Australian Sports Sedan Champion Tony Edmondson placed fourth in the championship winning Alfa Romeo Alfetta GTV-Chevrolet (running a 5.0L Formula 5000 engine) owned by Don Elliot.

== Schedule ==
The championship was contested over a nine-round series.

Round	Circuit	Date	Format	Round winner	Car
1	Winton Motor Raceway	16 May	Two races	Alan Jones	Porsche 935/80
2	Oran Park Raceway	6 June	One race	Alan Jones	Porsche 935/80
3	Lakeside International Raceway	20 June	Two races	Alan Jones	Porsche 935/80
4	Adelaide International Raceway	4 July	One race	Alan Jones	Porsche 935/80
5	Wanneroo Park	11 July	Two races	Alan Jones	Porsche 935/80
6	Calder Park Raceway	1 August	Two races	Alan Jones	Porsche 935/80
7	Surfers Paradise International Raceway	29 August	Two races	Alan Jones	Porsche 935/80
8	Symmons Plains Raceway	19 September	Two races	Alan Jones	Porsche 935/80
9	Baskerville Raceway	10 October	Two races	Alan Jones	Porsche 935/80

== Points system ==
Points were awarded on a 9–6–4–3–2–1 basis to the top six finishers in each round. Where rounds were contested over two races, points were allocated on a 20–16–13–11–10–9–8–7–6–5–4–3–2–1 basis for the first 14 positions in each race. These points were then aggregated to determine the first six-round positions for the purpose of championship points allocation.

== Results ==
Pos	Driver	No.	Car	Entrant	Win	Ora	Lak	Ade	Wan	Cal	Sur	Sym	Bas	Total
1	Alan Jones	27	Porsche 935	Porsche Cars Australia	9	9	9	9	9	9	9	9	9	81
2	Rusty French	10	Porsche 935	John Sands Racing	2	6	6	2	3	6	6	3	2	36
3	Colin Bond	28	Porsche 944 Turbo	Porsche Cars Australia	4	4	2	3	6	4	4	–	4	31
4	Tony Edmondson	1	Alfa Romeo Alfetta GTV – Chevrolet	Donald Elliot	6	–	–	4	4	3	1	4	3	25
5	Peter Brock	7	Chevrolet Monza	Bob Jane Racing	–	–	–	6	–	–	–	6	6	18
6	Doug Clark	78	Toyota Celica	Brian Hilton Toyota	–	2	3	–	–	–	2	–	–	7
7	Tony Hubbard	111	Holden LX Torana	Tony Hubbard	3	3	–	–	–	–	–	–	–	6
8	Bruce Lynton	18	BMW 318i Turbo	Bruce Lynton BMW	–	–	4	–	–	–	–	–	–	4
9	Kerry Baily	128	Holden LJ Torana	Kerry Baily	–	–	–	–	–	–	–	2	1	3
9	Gregory Wright	52	Holden LX Torana		–	–	–	–	–	–	3	–	–	3
11	Gordon Stephenson	75	Holden HQ Monaro		–	–	–	–	2	–	–	–	–	2
11	Graham Lusty	44	Toyota Celica	Lusty Engineering Pty. Ltd.	–	–	–	–	–	2	–	–	–	2
13	Peter Finch	16	Holden HQ Monaro		1	–	–	–	–	–	–	–	–	1
13	Peter Dane	47	Ford Escort	Thomson Ford	–	1	–	–	–	–	–	–	–	1
13	Steve Land	63	Holden Torana		–	–	1	–	–	–	–	–	–	1
13	Clem Smith	26	Chrysler VH Valiant Charger	Clem Smith	–	–	–	1	–	–	–	–	–	1
13	Brian Rhodes	77	Holden LX Torana		–	–	–	–	1	–	–	–	–	1
13	Jim Richards	31	BMW 318i Turbo	JPS Team BMW	–	–	–	–	–	1	–	–	–	1
13	Ian Beechey	94	Fiat 124 Coupe	Ian Beechey	–	–	–	–	–	–	–	1	–	1

== Championship name ==
Sources vary as to the actual name of the championship. The 1982 CAMS Manual uses "Australian Sports Sedan Championship" as does the Official Souvenir Programme for the 4th round of the championship at Adelaide International Raceway. Australian Motor Racing Yearbook 1982/93 uses "Australian GT/Sports Sedan Championship, as does Racing Car News, November 1982. The Confederation of Australian Motor Sport recognises Alan Jones as the winner of the "1982 Australian GT Championship" in its "Australian Titles" document.
