= 1963 Australian GT Championship =

Motor racing competition

Seasons
- ← 1962 1982 →

The 1963 Australian GT Championship was a motor racing competition for GT cars complying with Appendix K regulations. The championship was contested over a single 10 lap race staged at the Calder Motor Raceway in Victoria, Australia on 8 December 1963. It was recognised by the Confederation of Australian Motor Sport as the fourth Australian GT Championship.

The championship was won by Bob Jane driving a Jaguar E-Type lightweight.

== Results ==
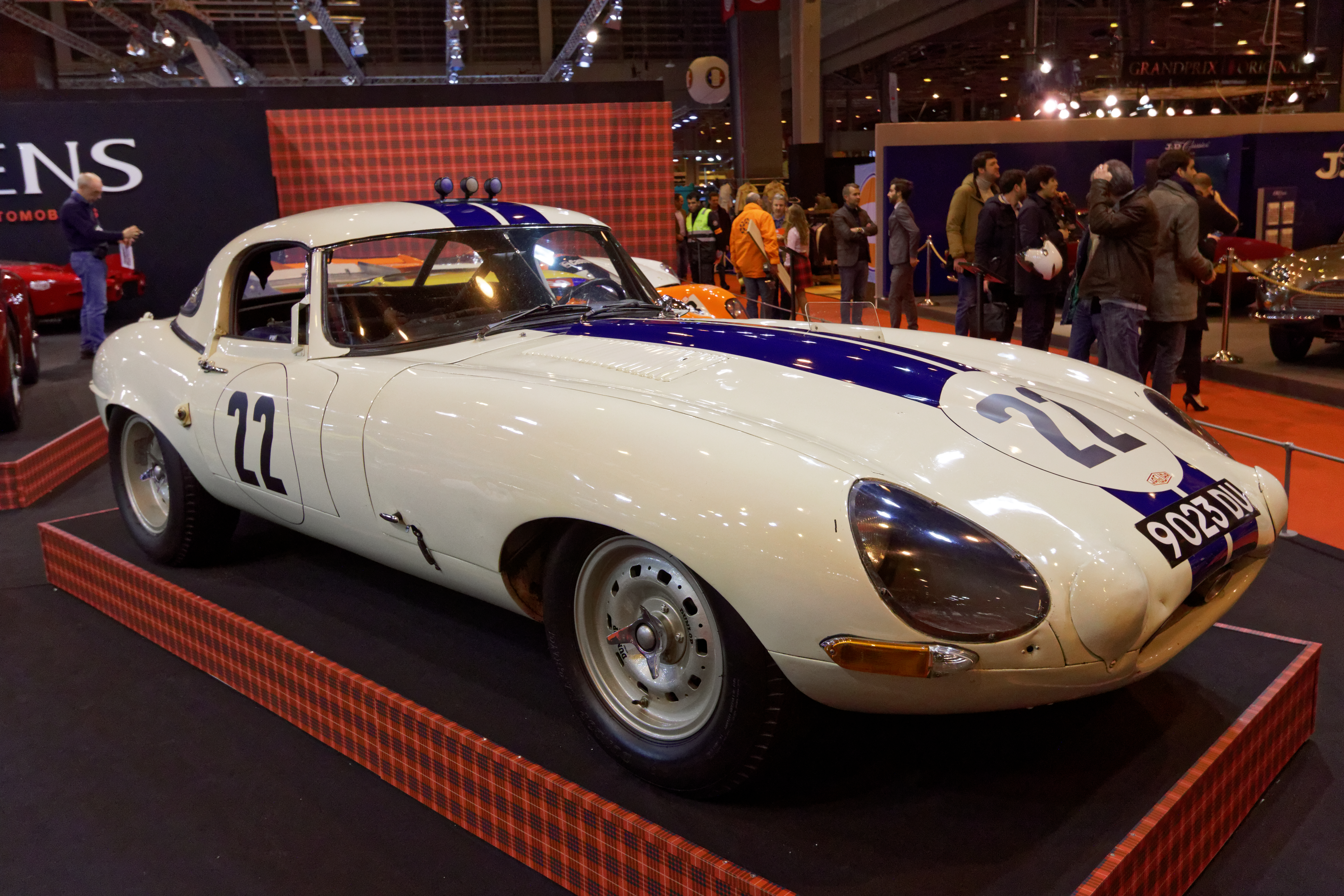
Bob Jane won the championship driving a Jaguar E-Type lightweight similar to the example pictured above

Position	Driver	No.	Car	Entrant	Laps	Time
1	Bob Jane	6	Jaguar E-Type lightweight	Bob Jane Jaguar-Fiat Sales	10	8m 48.8s
2	Murray Carter	20	Corvette Special	Murray Carter	10	8m 59.4s
3	Bill Jane	28	Jaguar E-Type	Bob Jane Jaguar-Fiat Sales	10	9m 17.4s
4	Brian Foley	48	Austin-Healey Sprite Mark IIA	P & R Williams	9	8m 56.0s
5	Alwyn Huf	5	Austin A30 1800	A. V. Motor Wreckers	9	9m 24.5s
6	Dick Bendell	63	Austin A30	Dick Bendell	9	9m 44.2s
7	Ian McDonald	69	MGB	Peter Manton Motors	9	9m 44.5s
8	T. James	50	Austin A30	Coreston Service Station	9	9m 50.3s
9	I. McCorkell	25	Austin Lancer	Pitstop Motor Improvements	8	8m 53.8s

=== Race statistics ===
- Race distance:10 laps (reduced from the original 20 laps)
- Starters: 9
- Finishers: 9
- Race time of winning car: 8:48.8
- Winning margin: 10.6
- Fastest lap: Bob Jane (Jaguar E-Type), 51.5 seconds
