= 1962 British Saloon Car Championship =

5th season of the British Touring Car Championship

Seasons
- ← 1961 1963 →

The 1962 BRSCC British Saloon Car Championship, was the fifth season of the championship. It began at Snetterton on 14 April and finished at Oulton Park on 1 September. Rhodesian driver John Love became the first non-British BSCC winner, driving a Morris Mini Cooper and an Austin Mini Cooper, making it the second consecutive championship win for a Mini driver.

== Calendar & Winners ==
All races were held in the United Kingdom. Overall winners in bold.

Round	Circuit	Date	Class A Winner	Class B Winner	Class C Winner	Class D Winner
1	Snetterton Motor Racing Circuit, Norfolk	14 April	(Federation of Rhodesia and Nyasaland) John Love	(United Kingdom) Alan Hutcheson	None (no entries?)	(United Kingdom) **Mike Parkes**
2	Goodwood Circuit, West Sussex	23 April	(United Kingdom) Christabel Carlisle	(United Kingdom) Alan Hutcheson	None (no entries)	(United Kingdom) **Graham Hill**
3	Aintree Motor Racing Circuit, Liverpool	28 April	(Federation of Rhodesia and Nyasaland) John Love	(United Kingdom) Alan Hutcheson	(United Kingdom) Nicky Byrne	(United Kingdom) **Graham Hill**
4	Silverstone Circuit, Northamptonshire	12 May	(Federation of Rhodesia and Nyasaland) John Love	(United Kingdom) Peter Harper	(United Kingdom) Innes Ireland	(United Kingdom) **Graham Hill**
5	Crystal Palace Circuit, London	11 June	(Federation of Rhodesia and Nyasaland) John Love	(United Kingdom) Peter Harper	None (no entries)	(United Kingdom) **Roy Salvadori**
NC	Goodwood Circuit, West Sussex	11 June	Unknown.	Unknown.	(United Kingdom) Nicky Byrne	**P.J. Woodroffe**
NC	Snetterton Motor Racing Circuit, Norfolk	15 July	(United Kingdom) Mick Clare	(United Kingdom) Alan Hutcheson	Unknown.	(United Kingdom) **Graham Hill**
6	Aintree Motor Racing Circuit, Liverpool	21 July	(Federation of Rhodesia and Nyasaland) John Love	(United Kingdom) Peter Harper	(United Kingdom) Nicky Byrne	(United Kingdom) **Jack Sears**
7	Brands Hatch, Kent	6 August	(Federation of Rhodesia and Nyasaland) John Love	(United Kingdom) Peter Jopp	(United Kingdom) David Haynes	(United Kingdom) **Mike Parkes**
8	Oulton Park, Cheshire	1 September	(Federation of Rhodesia and Nyasaland) John Love	(United Kingdom) Peter Harper	(United Kingdom) Chris McLaren?	(United Kingdom) **Graham Hill**
NC*	Brands Hatch, Kent	6 October	(United Kingdom) John Aley (New Zealand) Denny Hulme	Not contested.	(Italy) Piero Frescobaldi (Italy) Cesare Fiorio	(United Kingdom) **Mike Parkes** (United Kingdom) **Jimmy Blumer**

- The final race at Brands Hatch did not follow the same class structure as the preceding events. There were additional classes with 1300 & 1600cc engine capacity limits which were won by (United Kingdom) Alan Foster/ (United Kingdom) Andrew Hedges and (United Kingdom) Peter Procter/ (United Kingdom) Peter Harper, respectively.

== Championship results ==
Driver's championship
Pos.	Driver	Car	Team	Class	Points
1	(Federation of Rhodesia and Nyasaland) John Love	Morris Mini Cooper; Austin Mini Cooper	Cooper Car Co.	A	52
2	(United Kingdom) Peter Harper	Sunbeam Rapier	Sunbeam Talbot Ltd	B	49
3	(United Kingdom) Jack Sears	Jaguar Mk II 3.8	Equipe Endeavour	D	38
4	(United Kingdom) Graham Hill	Jaguar Mk II 3.8	John Coombs	D	37
5	(United Kingdom) Mike Parkes	Jaguar Mk II 3.8	Equipe Endeavour	D	32
6	(United Kingdom) Peter Jopp	Sunbeam Rapier	Alan Fraser	B	32
7	(United Kingdom) Alan Hutcheson	Riley 1.5	Barwell Motorsport	B	31
8	(United Kingdom) John Whitmore	Austin Mini Cooper	Cooper Car Co.	A	29
