= Bob Jane =

Australian racing driver and entrepreneur

- Nationality: Australian
- Born: Robert Frederick Jane; 18 December 1929
- Died: 28 September 2018 (aged 88)
- Retired: 1981

Australian Touring Car Championship
- Years active: 1962–1974
- Teams: Bob Jane Autoland
- Wins: 10
- Best finish: 1st in 1962, 1963, 1971 & 1972

Previous series
- 1961–63 1965–66 1965–66 1966 1970 1980–81: Australian GT Championship; Tasman Series; Australian Drivers' Championship; Australian 1½ Litre Champ. Australian Sports Car Champ. Australian Sports Sedan Champ.

Championship titles
- 1961 1962 1962 1963 1963 1963 1964 1971 1972: Armstrong 500; Australian Touring Car Champ. Armstrong 500; Australian Touring Car Champ. Australian GT Championship; Armstrong 500; Armstrong 500; Australian Touring Car Champ. Australian Touring Car Champ.

Awards
- 2000: V8 Supercars Hall of Fame

Robert Frederick Jane (18 December 1929 – 28 September 2018) was an Australian race car driver and prominent entrepreneur and business tycoon. A four-time winner of the Armstrong 500, the race that became the prestigious Bathurst 1000 and a four-time Australian Touring Car Champion, Jane was well known for his chain of tyre retailers, Bob Jane T-Marts. Jane was inducted into the V8 Supercars Hall of Fame in 2000.

== Early life ==
Bob Jane grew up in Brunswick, an inner-city suburb of Melbourne. His passion for racing began in the early 1950s as a champion bicycle rider, holding many state records before turning to four wheels. In the later 1950s, he started Bob Jane Autoland, a company that distributed parts for Jaguar and Alfa Romeo. Through this venture, a love of cars and motor sport blossomed and he first entered competitive racing in Australia in 1956; by 1960, he was racing with some of Australia's top sedan drivers.

== Racing career ==
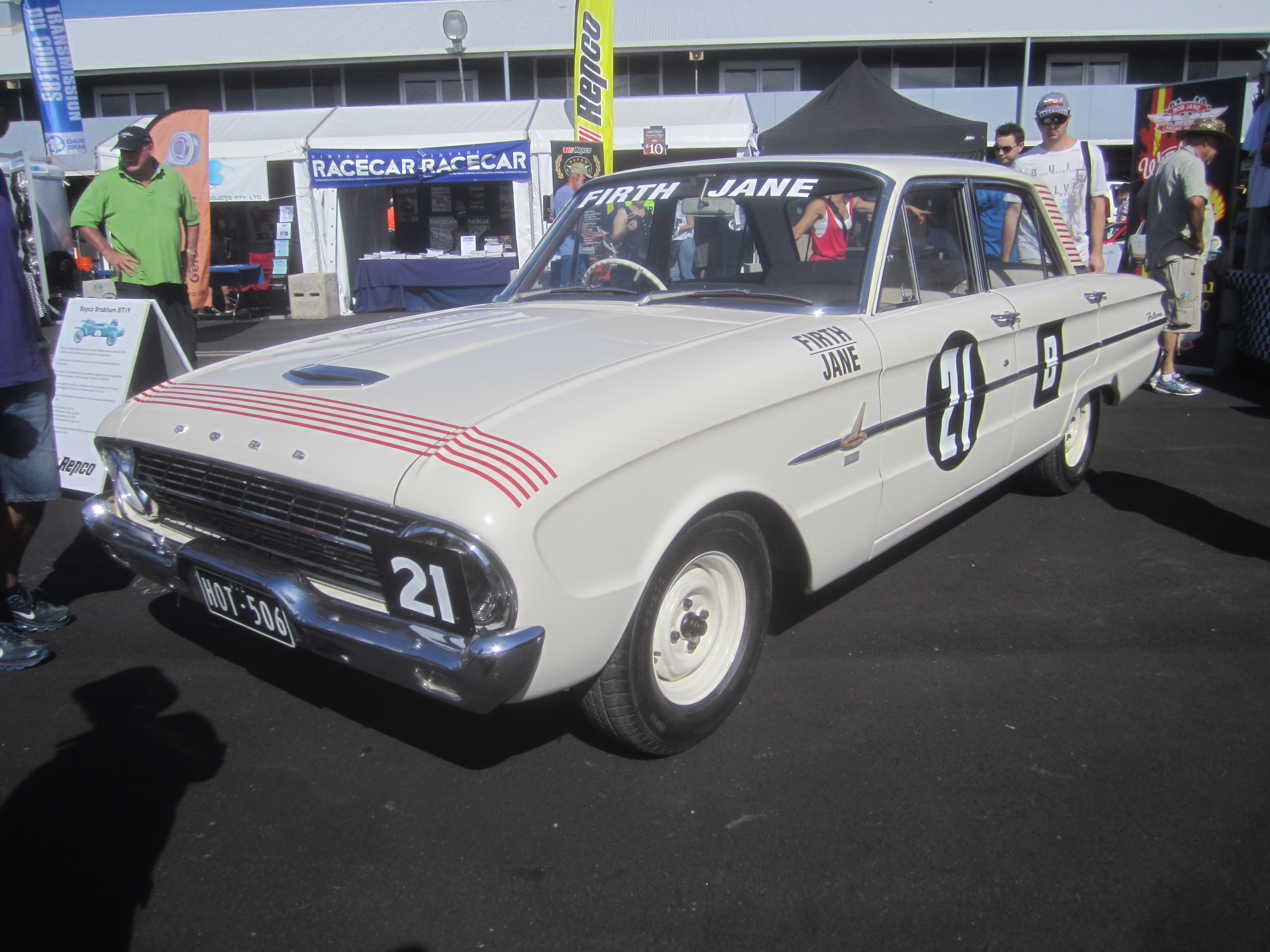
A Ford Falcon XL built up as a tribute to the car which was driven by Jane and Harry Firth to "First across the line" in the 1962 Armstrong 500

In 1961, Jane and co-driver Harry Firth won the Armstrong 500 at Phillip Island, Victoria, driving a Mercedes-Benz 220SE. Jane and Firth, driving a Ford Falcon XL, won the race again the following year, the last before the event moved to Mount Panorama at Bathurst, New South Wales, retaining the Armstrong 500 name. Jane, driving for the Ford works team, won a further two Armstrong 500s at the new venue, the first with Firth in 1963 and the second in 1964 with George Reynolds as co-driver. Despite the change of venue, Jane is officially credited with winning Australia's most famous endurance race four times in a row, something no other driver, not even nine-time race winner Peter Brock, has ever done.

Jane won the Australian Touring Car Championship (now known as the V8 Supercars Championship) in 1962, 1963, 1971 and 1972. His 1971 ATCC win was in a Chevrolet Camaro ZL-1 with a 427 cubic inch engine. Jane was forced by a rule change to replace the 427 engine with a 350 cubic inch engine for the 1972 championship but the Camaro still managed to beat the opposition, which included Allan Moffat's Ford Boss 302 Mustang, Ian Geoghegan's Ford XY Falcon GTHO Phase III, and Norm Beechey's Holden HT Monaro GTS350. Of the 38 races he started in the ATCC, he finished on the podium 21 times.

Jane also won the 1963 Australian GT Championship at the wheel of a Jaguar E-type, and the Marlboro Sports Sedan Series, in both 1974 and 1975, at his own Calder Park Raceway driving a Holden Monaro GTS 350 (at times he also drove his Repco V8 powered Holden LJ Torana GTR XU-1 which was mostly driven by John Harvey).

Jane retired from competitive motor racing at the end of 1981 due to sciatica. At the time of his retirement, he had been driving a 6.0 litre Chevrolet Monza in the Australian Sports Sedan Championship. After giving up driving, Jane asked touring car star Peter Brock to drive the Monza in the re-formed Australian GT Championship. Brock raced the car in 1982 and 1983 before Jane sold the car in early 1984 to Re-Car owner Allan Browne.

== Bob Jane T-Marts ==
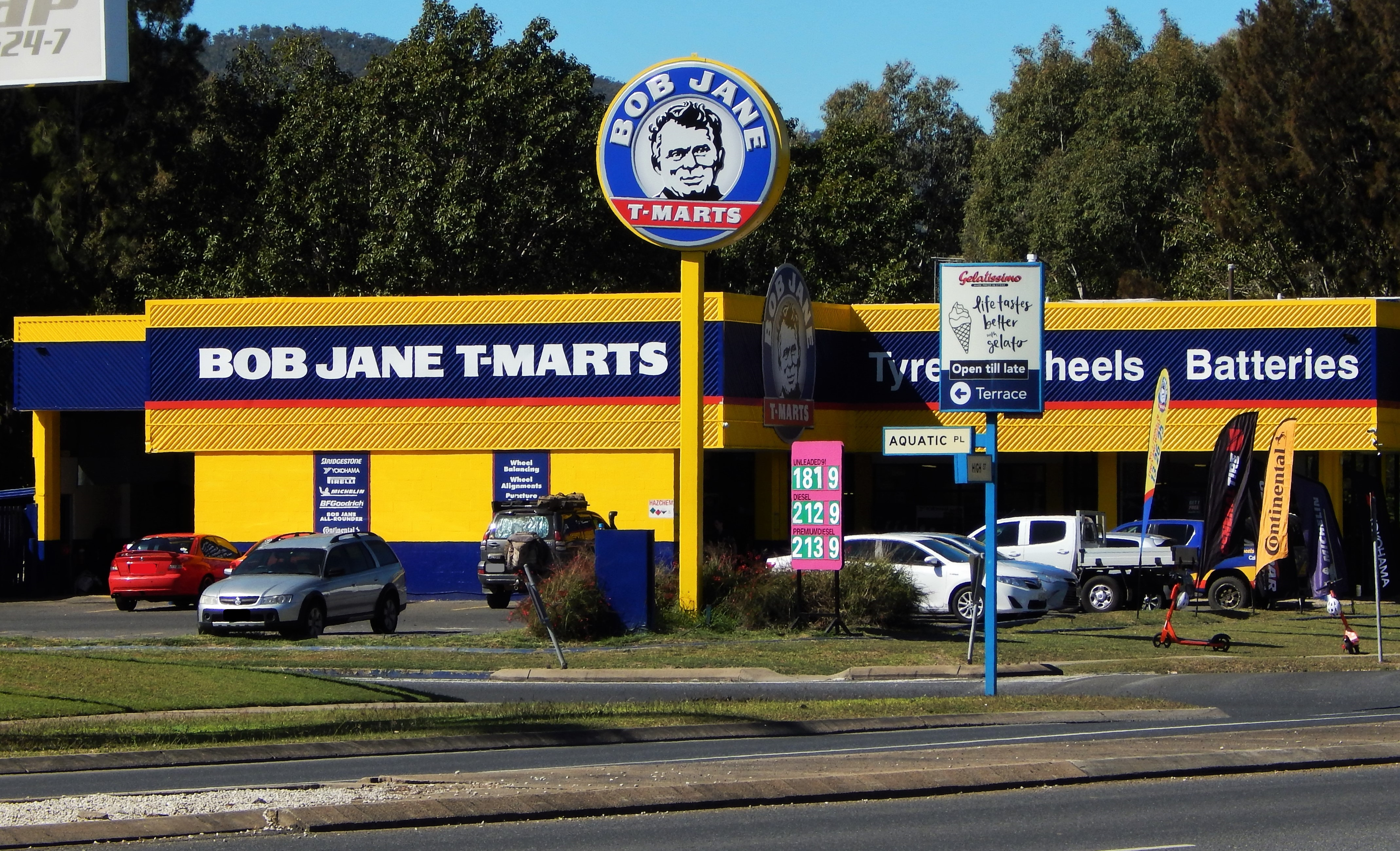
A Bob Jane T-Marts store, 2022

In 1965, Jane opened the first Bob Jane T-Marts store in Melbourne. The company remains an independent, family-owned business to this day; Bob's son, Rodney Jane, is the current CEO. In 2011, 81-year-old Jane resigned as chairman of T-Marts citing difficulties in the relationship with his son Rodney.

From 1984 to 1997, Jane formed a cross shareholding partnership with Ian Diffen. Jane operated in Queensland and Diffen operated Ian Diffen's World of Tyres and Mufflers in Western Australia.

From 2002 to 2004, Bob Jane T-Marts held the naming rights sponsorship for the Bathurst 1000, the race Jane dominated early in his career. The company also held the naming rights to the former Bob Jane Stadium, home of South Melbourne FC.

Bob Jane T-Marts is the only major tyre retailer in Australia who do not sell retread tyres. Jane's personal reason for this is that his second eldest daughter Georgina had died in a car accident in 1991 due to a retreaded tyre blowing out.

Having lost control of Bob Jane T-Marts, Jane attempted to create a new tyre business using his name. It was blocked by son Rodney in court which also ruled Jane pay legal costs. In May 2015, his Diggers Rest farm was seized by the state sheriff in order to settle the outstanding costs.

== Contributions to Australian motorsport ==
=== Australian Grand Prix ===
From 1980 to 1984, the Australian Grand Prix was held at his Calder Park Raceway in the outer suburbs of Melbourne, Jane taking over the promoting and staging of the Grand Prix in the hope of Calder Park being granted a round of the Formula One World Championship (an ambitious plan at best as Calder was a 1.6 km long circuit which the faster cars lapped in less than 40 seconds). The 1980 Grand Prix was open to Formula 5000, Formula Pacific and Formula One cars and was won by Australia's 1980 Formula One World Champion Alan Jones driving his World Championship winning Williams FW07B-Ford. Second home was fellow F1 driver Bruno Giacomelli driving his Alfa Romeo 179, with Ligier F1 driver Didier Pironi finishing third, driving an Elfin MR8 Formula 5000 for leading Australian team Ansett Team Elfin.

From 1981 until 1984, the races were run under Formula Mondial regulations and Jane succeeded in attracting many of the best Formula One drivers of the era. Each race from 1981 to 1984 was won by those driving the popular Ralt RT4-Ford.

The 1981 Australian Grand Prix was won by future F1 driver Roberto Moreno from Brazil. Finishing second, also in an RT4 was 1981 World Champion Nelson Piquet (Brazil) with Australian international Geoff Brabham (the eldest son of Sir Jack Brabham who was carving out a successful motor racing career in the United States) finishing third in his RT4. Alan Jones and Ligier's Jacques Laffite also participated in the race, though both failed to finish. The 1981 race was the first time since 1968 at Sandown that the AGP had two or more, current or past World Champions, on the starting grid. On that occasion, Jim Clark (first), Graham Hill (third), Denny Hulme (ninth), and Australia's own triple World Champion Jack Brabham (DNF) participated as the race was part of the popular off-season Tasman Series.

For the 1982 Australian Grand Prix, Jane again attracted F1 drivers in Piquet, Laffite, the then retired Jones, plus future Formula One World Champion Alain Prost. Frenchman Prost won the 100 lap race from Laffite and 1981 winner Roberto Moreno. When Prost later won his second AGP in Adelaide in 1986 to win his second of four Formula One World Championships, he became the only driver to ever win the Australian Grand Prix in both World Championship and Australian domestic formats (the 1982 AGP also counted as a round of the 1982 Australian Drivers' Championship, though none of the overseas drivers were eligible for series points).

The 1983 race, while only attracting one current F1 driver in Jacques Laffite, as well as Alan Jones who had made an abortive F1 comeback earlier in the year, did attract 24 entries (mostly the Ford powered RT4), including former winner Moreno, Geoff Brabham and future F1 driver Allen Berg. Moreno won his second AGP from local drivers John Smith and Laffite. Geoff Brabham finished 4th with Jones in 5th and Charlie O'Brien in sixth. Reigning Australian Drivers' Champion Alfredo Costanzo led for the first ¼ of the race in his Tiga FA81 before suffering a differential failure on his 26th lap 26. Moreno would later claim that had 'Alfie' not retired then he would likely have won as he didn't believe he would have caught the Italian born Aussie. The 1983 race was the last time the Grand Prix was included as a round of the Australian Drivers' Championship.

During 1984, it was announced that from 1985, the Australian Grand Prix would be held on the Streets of Adelaide and would be the 16th and final round of the 1985 Formula One season, giving the Grand Prix "World Championship" status for the first time in its history. Despite this, Jane was still able to successfully attract current Formula One drivers to participate in the 1984 Australian Grand Prix. Headlining the 'imports' was three time World Champion Niki Lauda who had won his third World title just one month earlier in Portugal, and 1982 World Champion Keke Rosberg. Joining them were 1984 Ligier drivers Andrea de Cesaris and François Hesnault and 1981 and 1983 AGP winner Roberto Moreno to face off against local stars Costanzo and 1984 Gold Star champion John Bowe. Moreno would win his third AGP in four years from Rosberg, who fought back from a bad start and a collision another car, with de Cesaris putting in the drive of the race to finish third after starting early from the pit lane and being almost half a lap down when he took the green flag.

=== NASCAR ===
Jane is credited with bringing stock car racing to Australia. Long resistant to oval racing (seeing it as dull and monotonous when compared to circuit racing, although speedway (Dirt track racing), held on smaller ¼ or ⅓ mile oval tracks, has been popular in Australia since the 1920s), Australian motorsport fans finally had their own NASCAR-style high banked superspeedway when Jane spent A$54 million building the Thunderdome on the grounds of Calder Park Raceway. The 1.801 km (1.119 mi) Thunderdome, with 24° banking in the turns, was built as a quad-oval with Jane modelling the track on the famous Charlotte Motor Speedway.

Opened on 3 August 1987, the Thunderdome played host to the first ever NASCAR event held outside North America on 28 February 1988 with the Goodyear NASCAR 500. Several prominent drivers from the United States came to Australia for this race including Alabama Gang members Bobby Allison and Neil Bonnett, along with Kyle Petty, Michael Waltrip, Dave Marcis, and others from the Winston West Series. Bonnett, who had won the Winston Cup's Pontiac Excitement 400 at the Richmond International Raceway the previous weekend, and Allison, who had won the 1988 Daytona 500 just one week prior to that, dominated the race, swapping the lead several times on a hot summer afternoon in which cabin temperatures were reported to reach over 57 °C (135 °F). Bonnett won the 280 lap race from Allison with Dave Marcis finishing third.

The race was marred by an early multi-car crash in turns 3 and 4 involving 8 cars including the Ford Thunderbird of local touring car champion Dick Johnson, and the Oldsmobile of Allan Grice who, after running out of brakes, couldn't slow down coming off the back straight and ran into the wreck at speed. Grice, whose car was a write-off, suffered a broken collarbone and was taken to hospital for x-rays.

Jane also owned the Adelaide International Raceway which features the only other paved NASCAR type oval in Australia with its half mile Speedway Super Bowl, which, unlike the Thunderdome, is a permanent part of the road circuit.

In 1992, Jane and Sydney based speedway promoter and Channel 7 television commentator Mike Raymond also announced plans to turn the old half mile harness racing track that surrounded the Parramatta Speedway in Sydney into a paved oval for NASCAR and the Australian AUSCAR category, giving Australia a third paved oval speedway. However, the project never got past the planning stage.

== Personal life ==
On 23 February 2007, Jane was granted a 12-month intervention order against his estranged wife, Laree Jane (born 1967). At the time, she was 39 years old and they had been married for 20 years. He accused her of threatening to shoot him and threatening him with a kitchen knife. In a Victorian County Court, on 22 January 2009, a jury found Laree Jane not guilty of five charges, including assault, related to the domestic dispute.

Jane met Laree when he performed Grand Marshal duties for the 1986 James Hardie 1000 at Bathurst.

Jane declared bankruptcy on 8 July 2016.

On 28 September 2018, Jane died from prostate cancer, 21 years after his diagnosis. He was 88.

== Career results ==
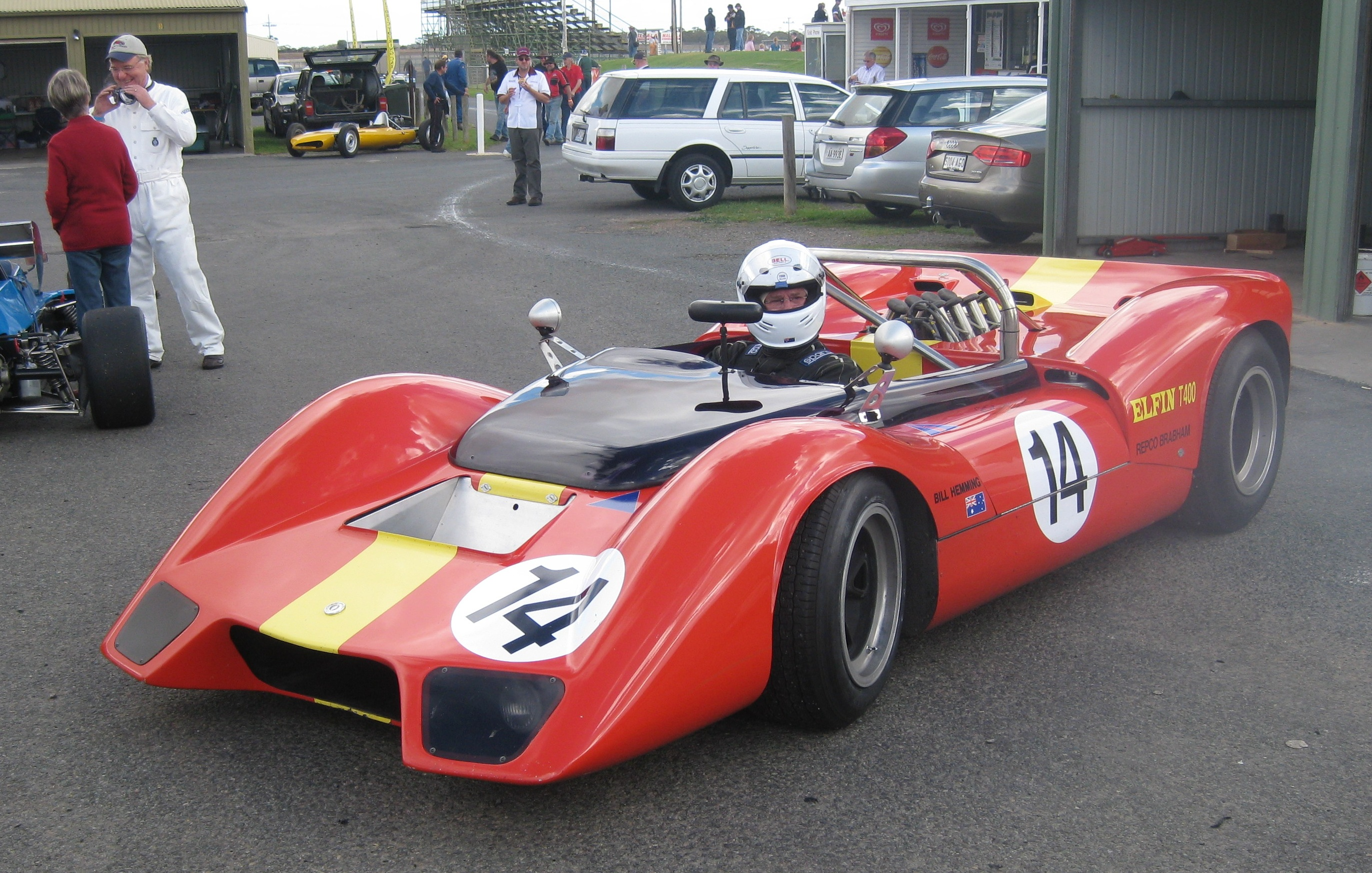
The Elfin 400 Repco which Jane raced in the same colours during the late 1960s

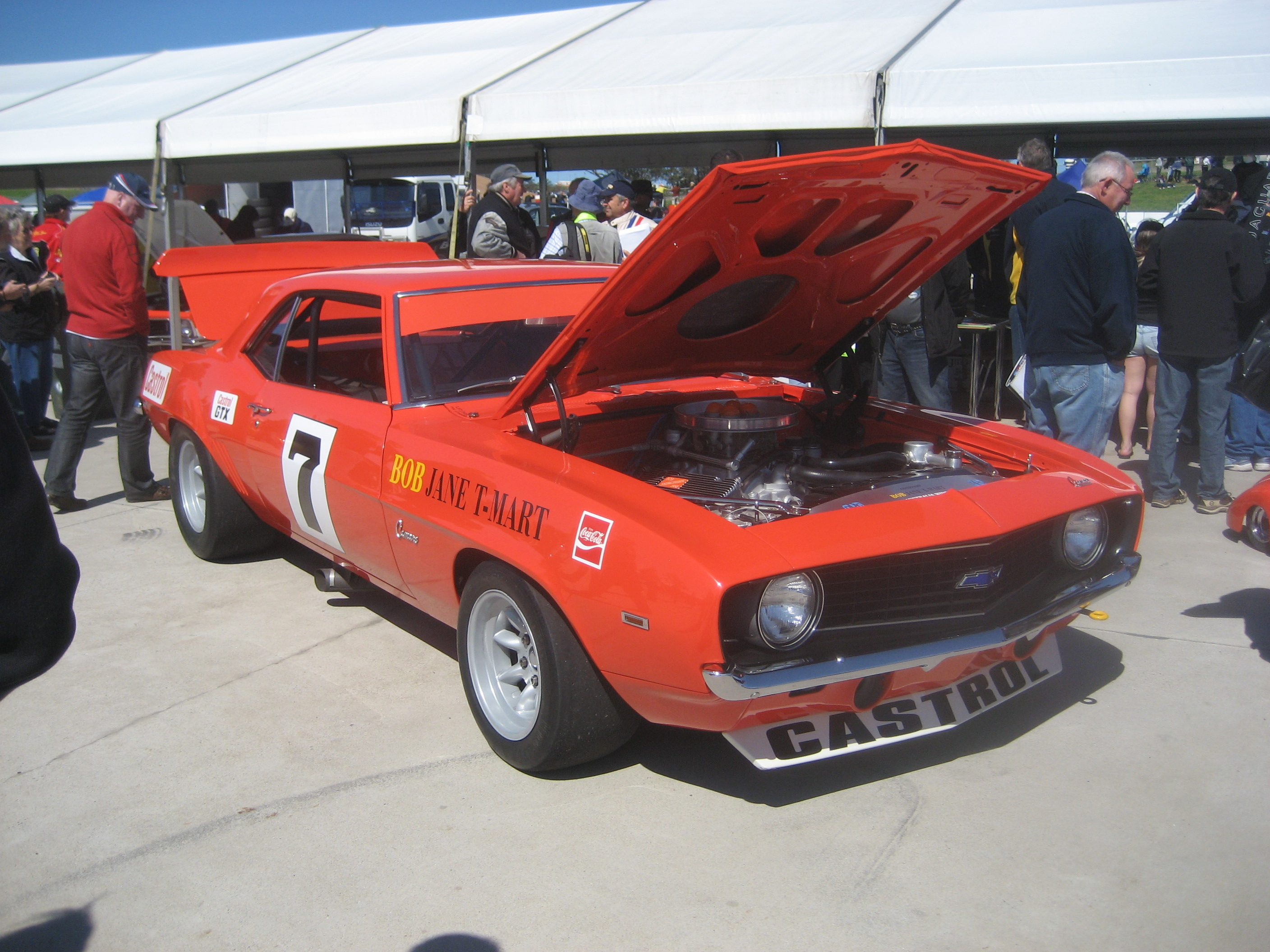
The 1969 Chevrolet Camaro ZL-1 in which Jane won the Australian Touring Car Championship in 1971 & 1972.

Season	Title	Position	Car	Entrant
1958	Victorian Tourist Trophy	5th	Maserati 300S	New York Motors Pty Ltd
1959	Australian Tourist Trophy	**3rd**	Maserati 300S	R Jane
1961	Australian Tourist Trophy	**3rd**	Maserati 300S	Autoland Pty Ltd
1961	Australian GT Championship	4th	Maserati 300S	Autoland Pty Ltd
1962	Australian Tourist Trophy	**2nd**	Maserati 300S	R. Jane
1962	Australian Touring Car Championship	**1st**	Jaguar Mark II	Autoland P/L
1962	British Saloon Car Championship	35th	Jaguar Mark II	John Coombs
1963	Australian Touring Car Championship	**1st**	Jaguar Mark II	R Jane
1963	Australian GT Championship	**1st**	Jaguar E-type	Bob Jane Jaguar-Fiat Sales
1964	Australian Tourist Trophy	**2nd**	Jaguar E-type	
1964	Australian Touring Car Championship	**3rd**	Jaguar Mark II	Autoland Australia
1965	Australian Drivers' Championship	13th	Elfin Mono Mk1 Ford	Bob Jane Autoland
1965	Australian Tourist Trophy	4th	Jaguar E-type	
1966	Australian Drivers' Championship	17th	Elfin Mono Mk1 Ford	Bob Jane Racing
1966	Australian 1½ Litre Championship	6th	Elfin Mono Mk1 Ford	Bob Jane Racing
1969	Australian Touring Car Championship	6th	Ford Mustang	Bob Jane Racing Team
1970	Australian Sports Car Championship	8th	Ford Mustang	Bob Jane Shell Racing Team
1970	Australian Touring Car Championship	**3rd**	Ford Mustang	Bob Jane Shell Racing Team
1971	Australian Touring Car Championship	**1st**	Chevrolet Camaro ZL-1	Bob Jane Racing
1972	Australian Touring Car Championship	**1st**	Chevrolet Camaro ZL-1	Bob Jane Racing
1973	Australian Touring Car Championship	23rd	Holden LJ Torana GTR XU-1	Bob Jane Racing
1974	Australian Touring Car Championship	26th	Holden LJ Torana GTR XU-1	Bob Jane Racing
1974	Marlboro Sports Sedan Series	**1st**	Holden LJ Torana Repco Holden	Bob Jane Racing
1975	Marlboro Sports Sedan Series	**1st**	Holden HQ Monaro GTS350	Bob Jane Racing
1976	Australian Sports Sedan Championship	9th	Holden HQ Monaro GTS350	Bob Jane T-Marts
1977	Australian Sports Sedan Championship	9th	Holden HQ Monaro GTS350	Bob Jane 2UW Racing Team
1980	Australian Sports Sedan Championship	19th	Chevrolet Monza	Bob Jane T-Marts
1981	Australian Sports Sedan Championship	9th	Chevrolet Monza	Bob Jane T-Marts

=== Complete Australian Touring Car Championship results ===
(key) (Races in bold indicate pole position) (Races in italics indicate fastest lap)

Year	Team	Car	1	2	3	4	5	6	7	8	DC	Points
1961		Jaguar Mk.2 3.8	LOW; Ret								NC	-
1962	R Jane	Jaguar Mk.2 3.8	**LON**; 1								1st	-
1963	R Jane	Jaguar Mk.2 4.1	**MAL**; 1								1st	-
1964	Autoland Australia	Jaguar Mk.2 4.1	LAK; 3								3rd	-
1965		Ford Mustang	**SAN**; Ret								NC	-
1967		Ford Mustang	LAK; Ret								NC	-
1968	Bob Jane's Autoland	Ford Mustang	WAR; Ret								NC	-
1969	Bob Jane Racing Team	Ford Mustang	CAL; 1	BAT; Ret	**MAL**; Ret	SUR	SYM				6th	9
1970	Bob Jane Shell Racing Team	Ford Mustang	CAL; 4	BAT; 3	SAN; 4	MAL; 5	WAR; 2	LAK; 2	SYM; 3		3rd	28
1971	Bob Jane Racing Team	Chevrolet Camaro ZL-1	**SYM**; 2	CAL; Ret	**SAN**; 1	SUR; 2	**MAL**; 1	LAK; 3	ORA; 1		1st	43
1972	Bob Jane Racing	Chevrolet Camaro ZL-1	SYM; 2	CAL; 1	**BAT**; Ret	SAN; 2	AIR; 1	WAR; 1	SUR; 1	ORA; 3	1st	76
1973	Bob Jane Racing	Holden LJ Torana GTR XU-1 Chevrolet Camaro ZL-1	SYM; 4	CAL; DSQ	SAN	WAN	SUR	AIR	ORA	WAR	23rd	4
1974	Bob Jane Racing	Holden LJ Torana GTR XU-1	SYM; 5	CAL; Ret	SAN	AMA	ORA	SUR	AIR		25th	2
1975	Bob Jane Racing	Holden LH Torana SL/R 5000 L34	SYM	CAL; Ret	AMA	ORA	SUR	SAN	AIR	LAK	NC	0

=== Complete British Saloon Car Championship results ===
(key) (Races in bold indicate pole position; races in italics indicate fastest lap.)

Year	Team	Car	Class	1	2	3	4	5	6	7	8	DC	Pts	Class
1962	John Coombs	Jaguar Mk II 3.8	D	SNE	GOO	AIN	SIL	CRY	AIN; Ret	BRH	OUL	35th	1	8th

=== Complete Phillip Island/Bathurst 500/1000 results ===
Year	Team	Co-driver	Car	Class	Laps	Overall position	Class position
1960	(Australia) Autoland	(Australia) Lou Molina	Ford XK Falcon	D	161	NA	**3rd**
1961	(Australia) Autoland Pty Ltd	(Australia) Harry Firth	Mercedes-Benz 220SE	B	167	**1st**	**1st**
1962	(Australia) Ford Motor Company	(Australia) Harry Firth	Ford Falcon XL	B	167	**1st**	**1st**
1963	Ford Australia	(Australia) Harry Firth	Ford Cortina Mk.I GT	C	130	**1st**	**1st**
1964	(Australia) Ford Motor Co	(Australia) George Reynolds	Ford Cortina Mk.I GT	C	130	**1st**	**1st**
1965	(Australia) Ford Motor Co	(Australia) George Reynolds	Ford Cortina Mk.I GT500	D	58	DNF	DNF
1967	Ford Australia	(Australia) Spencer Martin	Ford XR Falcon GT	D	118	18th	8th
1971	(Australia) Bob Jane Racing Team	(Australia) John Harvey	Holden LC Torana GTR XU-1	D	50	DNF	DNF
1973	(Australia) Bob Jane Racing	(Australia) John Harvey	Holden LJ Torana GTR XU-1	D	161	4th	4th
1974	(Australia) Bob Jane Racing	(Australia) Frank Gardner	Holden LH Torana SL/R 5000 L34	3001 – 6000cc	7	DNF	DNF
1977	(Australia) Bob Jane 2UW Racing Team	(Australia) Ian Geoghegan	Holden LX Torana SS A9X Hatchback	3001cc – 6000cc	35	DNF	DNF

== Bibliography ==
- West, Luke (20 August 2021). The Immortals of Australian Motor Racing: The Local Heroes (Part of the 7-volume comprehensive sports collection). Immortals of Australian Sport (7-book series). Gelding Street Press. ISBN 978-1-925946-98-7.

Sporting positions
Preceded by John Roxburgh; Frank Coad	Winner of the Phillip Island / Bathurst 500; 1961, 1962, 1963 & 1964 (with Harry Firth and George Reynolds)	Succeeded by Barry Seton; Midge Bosworth
Preceded by Bill Pitt	Winner of the Australian Touring Car Championship; 1962 & 1963	Succeeded by Ian Geoghegan
Preceded by Norm Beechey	Winner of the Australian Touring Car Championship; 1971 & 1972	Succeeded by Allan Moffat
Records
Preceded by David McKay; 1 win (1960)	Most ATCC round wins 2 (1962 – 1974), 2nd win at the 1963 Australian Touring Car Championship	Succeeded by Ian Geoghegan; 8 wins (1961 – 1978)
Preceded by Ian Geoghegan; 8 wins (1961 – 1978)	Most ATCC round wins 10 (1962 – 1974), 9th win at Round 6 of the 1972 Australian Touring Car Championship	Succeeded by Allan Moffat; 25 wins (1964 – 1988)
