= 1980 Australian Sports Sedan Championship =

Motor racing competition

The 1980 Australian Sports Sedan Championship was open to drivers of Sports Sedans complying with CAMS Group B regulations. The title was contested over an eleven-round series

- Round 1, Oran Park Raceway, New South Wales, 23 March
- Round 2, Winton Motor Raceway, Victoria, 4 May
- Round 3, Amaroo Park, New South Wales, 25 May
- Round 4, Wanneroo Park, Western Australia, 8 June
- Round 5, Lakeside International Raceway, Queensland, 22 June
- Round 6, Calder Park Raceway, Victoria, 3 August
- Round 7, Surfers Paradise, Queensland, 31 August
- Round 8, Symmons Plains, Tasmania, 21 September
- Round 9, Baskerville, Tasmania, 12 October
- Round 10, The Advertiser Sports Sedan Challenge, Adelaide International Raceway, South Australia, 19 October
- Round 11, Sandown Raceway, Victoria, 14 December

Points were awarded on a 9-6-4-3-2-1 basis to the top six outright placegetters in each round. Only the best nine scores could be retained by each driver although this had no effect on the nett pointscores.

== Results ==
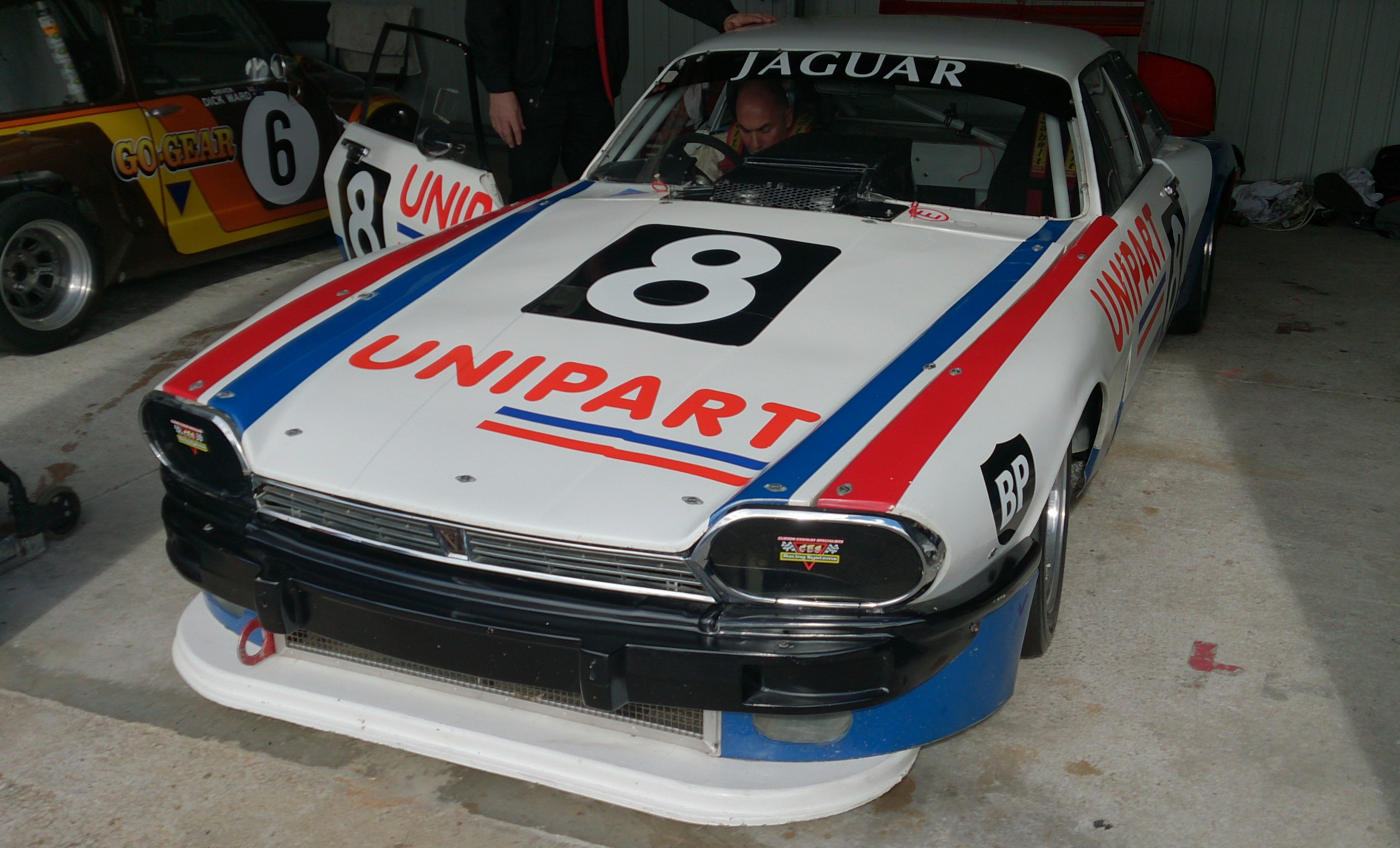
John McCormack placed 4th in this Jaguar XJ-S (pictured in 2015 in its 1980 livery)

Position	Driver	No.	Car	Entrant	Rd1	Rd2	Rd3	Rd4	Rd5	Rd6	Rd7	Rd8	Rd9	Rd10	Rd11	Total
1	Tony Edmondson	9	Alfa Romeo Alfetta GTV Repco Holden	Donald Elliott	6	6	6	9	-	9	9	1	9	-	4	59
2	Allan Grice	7 / 1 / 6	Holden Torana LX; BMW 318i Turbo	Craven Mild Racing	4	-	-	6	9	6	-	-	6	9	3	43
3	Jim Richards	15	Ford XC Falcon Hardtop	Jim Richards	-	9	9	4	-	-	-	-	-	-	9	31
4	John McCormack	8	Jaguar XJ-S	McCormack - Unipart Racing	-	3	2	2	6	-	-	6	-	-	-	19
4	Graeme Whincup	5	Chevrolet Monza	Graeme Whincup	3	2	1	1	3	3	-	-	-	6	-	19
6	John Briggs	7	Chevrolet Monza	JR Team Monza	-	-	-	-	-	-	-	9	-	-	6	15
6	Garry Rogers	34	Holden Torana LX	Greater Pacific Finance	-	-	4	3	-	4	-	4	-	-	-	15
8	Phil Ward	2	Holden Monaro HQ	Australian Penthouse Racing	9	-	-	-	-	-	-	-	-	-	-	9
9	Brian Potts	42 / 20	Holden Torana LJ		2	-	-	-	2	-	4	-	-	-	-	8
10	Tony Parkinson	2	Holden Commodore VB	QH-ABS	-	-	-	-	-	1	-	-	-	4	2	7
11	Paul Gulson	44	Leyland Mini - Mazda	Paul Gulson	-	-	-	-	-	-	6	-	-	-	-	6
11	Steve Harrington	4	Holden Torana	Roadways of Tasmania	-	-	-	-	-	-	-	3	3	-	-	6
13	Wayne Mahnken	79	Holden EH - Turbo		-	4	-	-	-	-	-	-	-	-	-	4
13	Allan Moffat	25 / 77	Chevrolet Monza; Mazda RX-7	Allan Moffat Racing	-	-	3	-	-	-	-	-	-	-	1	4
13	Mike Griffen	41	Datsun 120Y - Mazda		-	-	-	-	4	-	-	-	-	-	-	4
13	Richard Purtell	27	Holden Torana		-	-	-	-	-	-	-	-	4	-	-	4
17	Greg Wright	47	Holden Torana LX		-	-	-	-	-	-	3	-	-	-	-	3
17	David Ferrall	27	Chrysler Charger CL - Chevrolet	Road & Track Services (SA) Pty Ltd	-	-	-	-	-	-	-	-	-	3	-	3
19	Bob Jane	10	Chevrolet Monza	Bob Jane T-Marts	-	-	-	-	-	2	-	-	-	-	-	2
19	Ian Denner	97	Ford Cortina		-	-	-	-	-	-	2	-	-	-	-	2
19	Vince Powell	30	Ford Cortina TD - Chevrolet	Elite Racing	-	-	-	-	-	-	1	-	1	-	-	2
19	Martin Sinclair	96	Holden Torana		-	-	-	-	-	-	-	2	-	-	-	2
19	Robbie Mills	13	Toyota Corona - Holden		-	-	-	-	-	-	-	-	2	-	-	2
19	Max Clark	11	Holden Torana LH SLR5000 L34	Max Clark	-	-	-	-	-	-	-	-	-	2	-	2
25	Bruce Stewart	33	Holden Torana		1	-	-	-	-	-	-	-	-	-	-	1
25	Kent Youlden	58	Ford Cortina		-	1	-	-	-	-	-	-	-	-	-	1
25	Russell Worthington	100	Mazda RX-3		-	-	-	-	1	-	-	-	-	-	-	1
25	James Bartsch	93	Holden Torana	James Bartsch	-	-	-	-	-	-	-	-	-	1	-	1
