= Jaguar Mark 2 =

Jaguar Mark 2; Jaguar 240 and 340
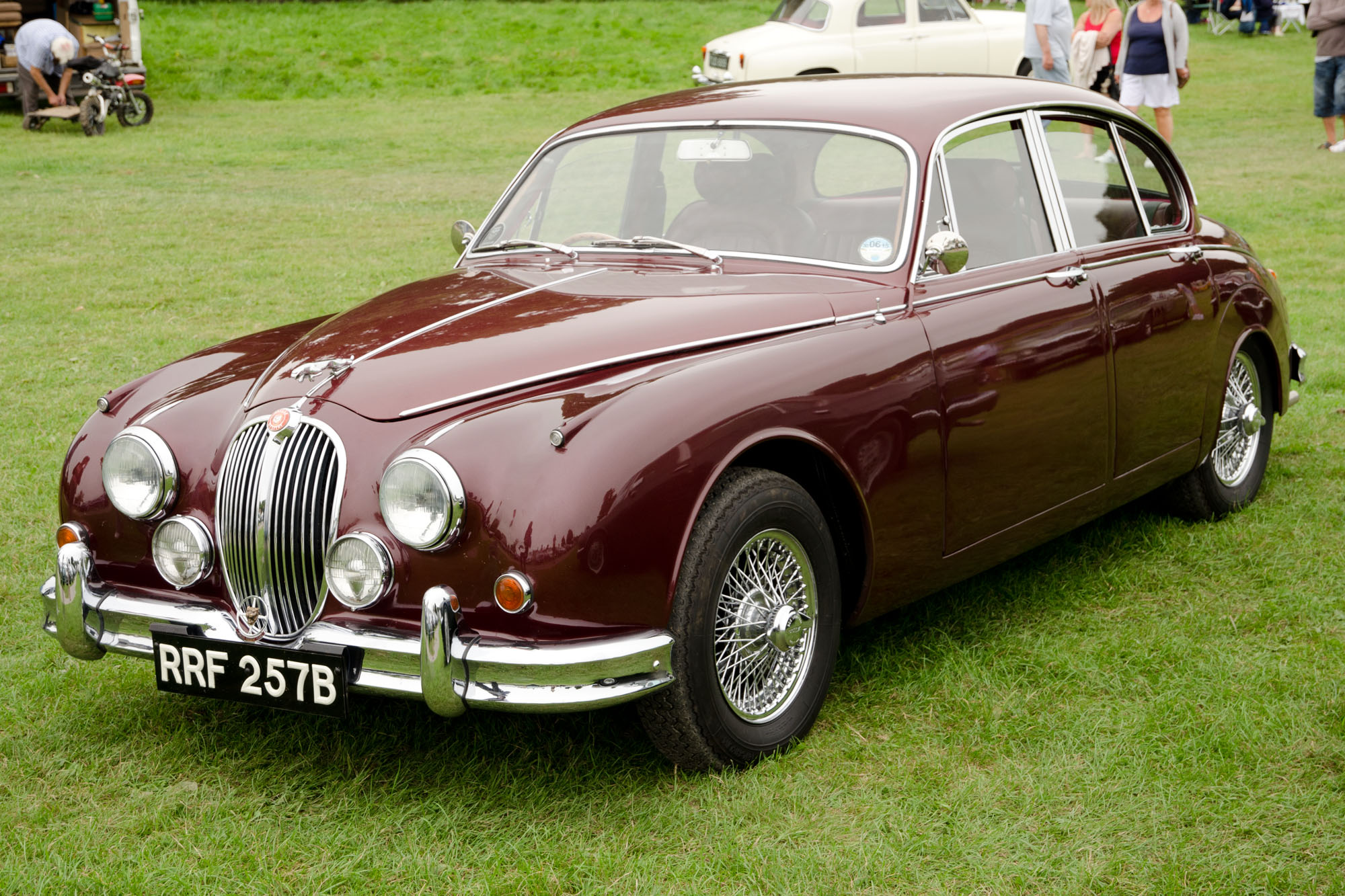
- Jaguar Mark 2 3.4 litre first registered 1964

Overview
- Manufacturer: Jaguar Cars
- Also called: Jaguar 240 & Jaguar 340 (from September 1967); Jaguar 3.8 Sedan (US market)
- Production: 1959–1967 (Mark 2); 1967–1969 (240 & 340)
- Assembly: United Kingdom: Coventry

Body and chassis
- Class: Mid-size luxury / Executive car (E); Sports saloon
- Body style: 4-door saloon
- Layout: FR layout
- Related: Daimler 2.5-V8 / V8-250; Jaguar S-Type; Jaguar 420; Jaguar XJ6

Powertrain
- Engine: Jaguar XK engine (I6): 2,483 cc (2.5 L); 3,442 cc (3.4 L); 3,781 cc (3.8 L)
- Transmission: 4-speed manual; 4-speed manual with overdrive; 3-speed Borg-Warner 35 automatic

Dimensions
- Wheelbase: 107 in (2,718 mm)
- Length: 180 in (4,572 mm)
- Width: 67 in (1,702 mm)
- Height: 58 in (1,473 mm)
- Kerb weight: 3,174 lb (1,440 kg) 2.4 manual without overdrive

Chronology
- Predecessor: Jaguar Mark 1 Daimler 250
- Successor: not replaced, Jaguar S-Type

The Jaguar Mark 2 is a mid-sized luxury sports saloon built from late 1959 to 1967 by Jaguar in Coventry, England. The previous Jaguar 2.4 Litre and 3.4 Litre models made between 1955 and 1959 are identified as Mark 1 Jaguars.

The Mark 2 was a fast and capable saloon in line with Sir William Lyons' 1950s advertising slogan: Grace . . . Space . . . Pace, available with all three versions of the advanced Jaguar XK engine: the 2.4, 3.4, and 3.8 litre.

Production of the 3.8 ended in the autumn of 1967, with discounted sale of the 3.4 continuing on as the 340 until September 1968, and the 2.4 as the 240 until April 1969.

There was no direct successor to the Mark 2 series. The 3.8 litre Jaguar S-Type, an upscaled and refined version of the Mark 2, had already appeared in 1963, well before the first of the Mark 2 models was discontinued. The Jaguar 420, a more powerful and refined version of the S-Type, appeared in 1966. Both of those models remained in production until late 1968, when the Jaguar XJ6 appeared, ostensibly replacing and placed rather midway between them and the larger, more expensive Jaguar Mark X produced since 1961.

== Engine ==
The Mark 2 came with a 120 bhp (89 kW; 122 PS) 2,483 cubic centimetres (152 cu in), 210 bhp (157 kW; 213 PS) 3,442 cubic centimetres (210 cu in) or 220 bhp (164 kW; 223 PS) 3,781 cubic centimetres (231 cu in) Jaguar XK engine. The 3.8 is similar to the unit used in the 3.8 E-Type (called XKE in the USA), having the same block, crank, connecting rods and pistons but different inlet manifold and carburation (two SUs versus three on the E-Type in Europe) and therefore 30 bhp (22 kW) less. The head of the six-cylinder engine in the Mark 2 had curved ports compared to the straight ports of the E-Type configuration. The 3.4 Litre and 3.8 Litre cars were fitted with twin SU HD6 carburettors and the 2.4 Litre with twin Solex carburettors.

Aware of the importance of the quotable numbers to the US market, Jaguar continued to use claimed gross bhp figures throughout the production period of the Mk II and 240/340 models. A direct conversion to DIN bhp is not possible, but the 3.8 Mk II engine developed about 190 bhp by modern DIN standards. This compares with the later 4.2 XJ6 engine, which also produced around 190 bhp DIN, or 245 gross bhp according to Jaguar. The explanation was that the XJ6 4.2 engine was delivering the power at lower rpm. The camshaft timing and inlet and exhaust valve sizes were the same for the 2.4,3.4,3.8 Mk II and XJ6 4.2 engines, so the engines throttled themselves sooner in the larger engine sizes. Later 4.2 XJ6 engines had special induction pipes, to reduce exhaust emissions, that crossed over between the inlet and exhaust sides of the engine. These reduced bhp to around 170 bhp on later production.

== Body ==
The new car was re-engineered above the waistline, with vision dramatically improved by an 18% increase in cabin glass area. Slender front pillars allowed a wider windscreen, and the rear window almost wrapped around to the enlarged side windows, now with the familiar Jaguar D-shape above the back door and fully chromed frames for all the side windows. The radiator grille was changed, and larger side, tail and fog lamps were repositioned. Inside, a new heating system was fitted and ducted to the rear compartment. There was an improved instrument layout that became standard for all Jaguar cars until the XJ series II of 1973.

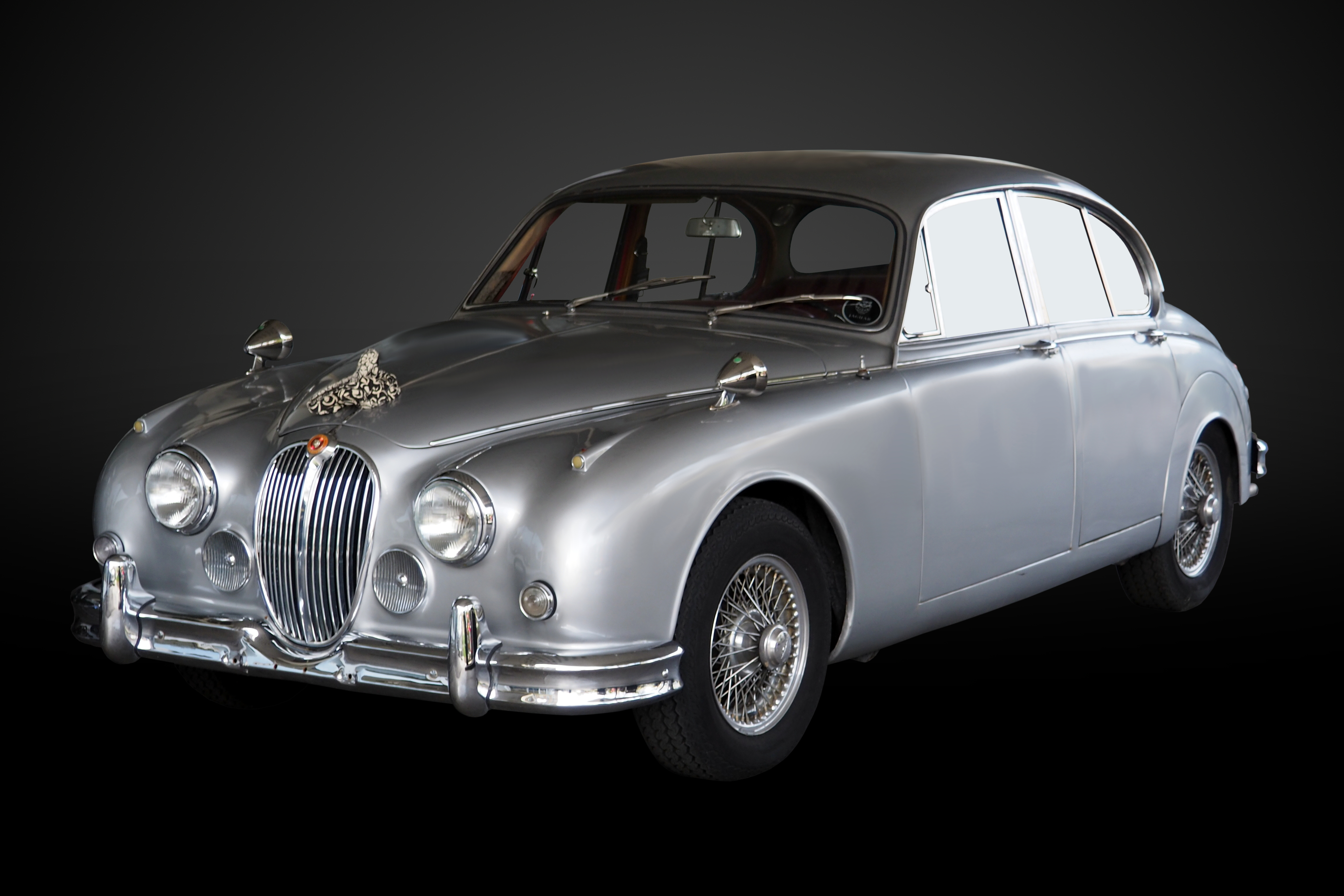

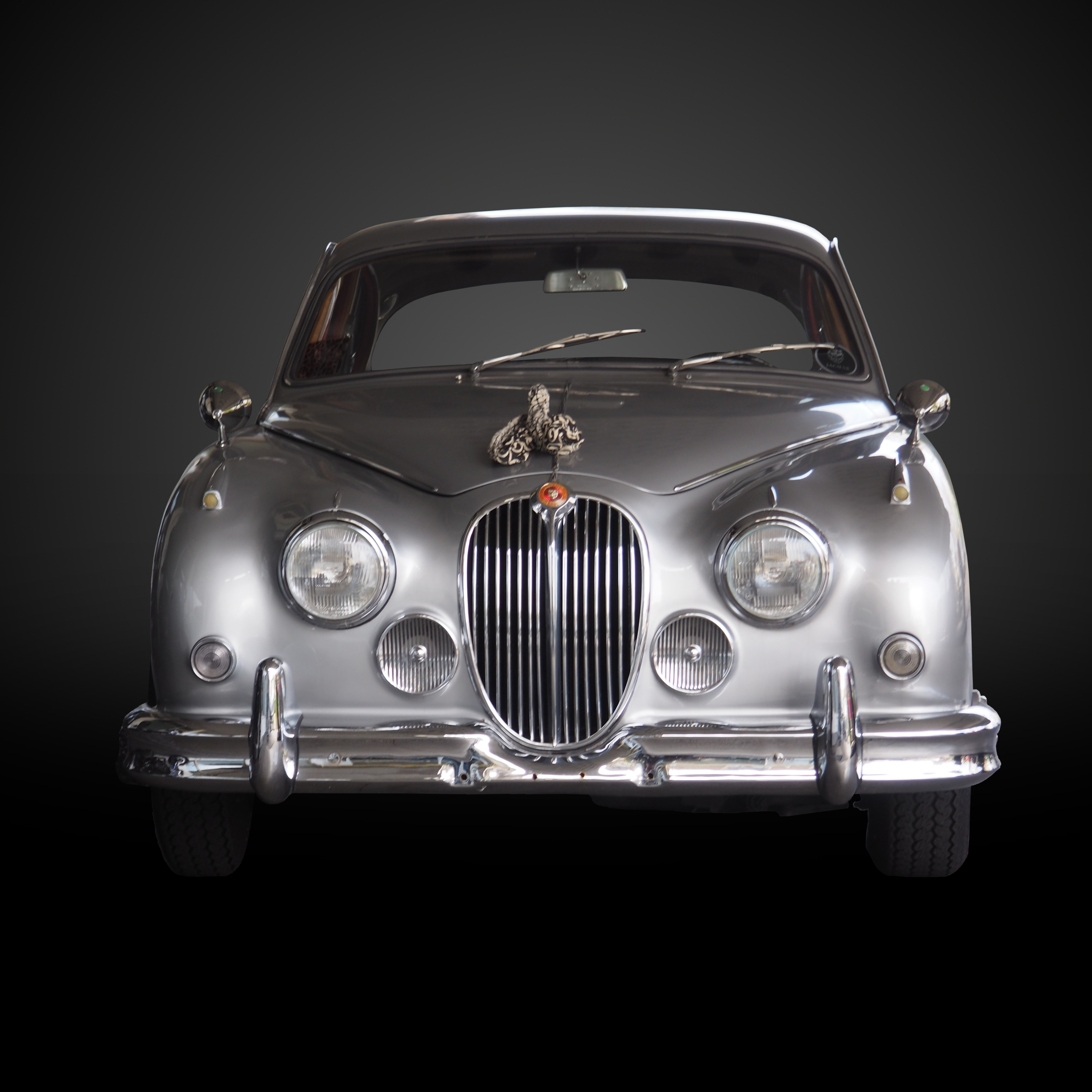

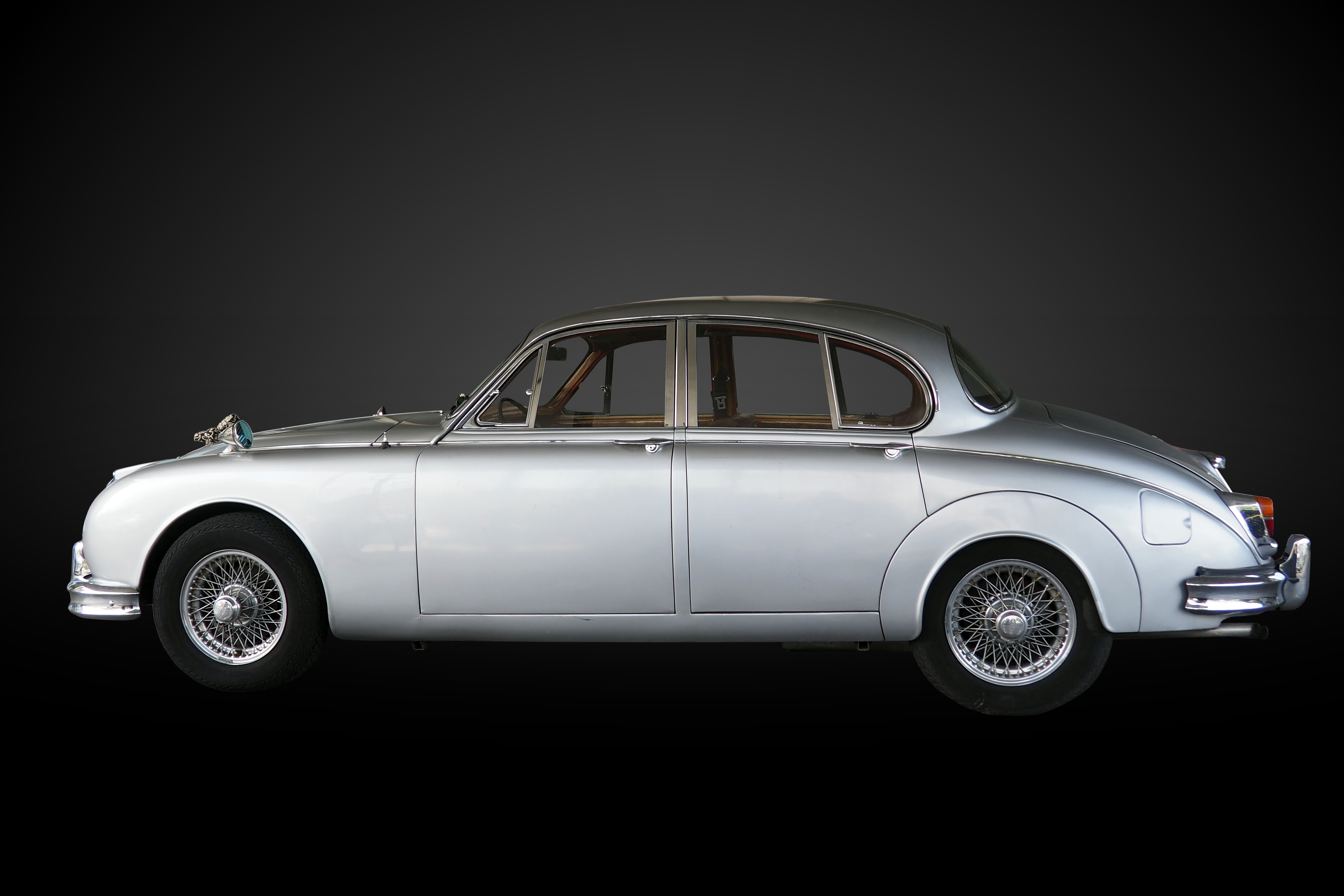

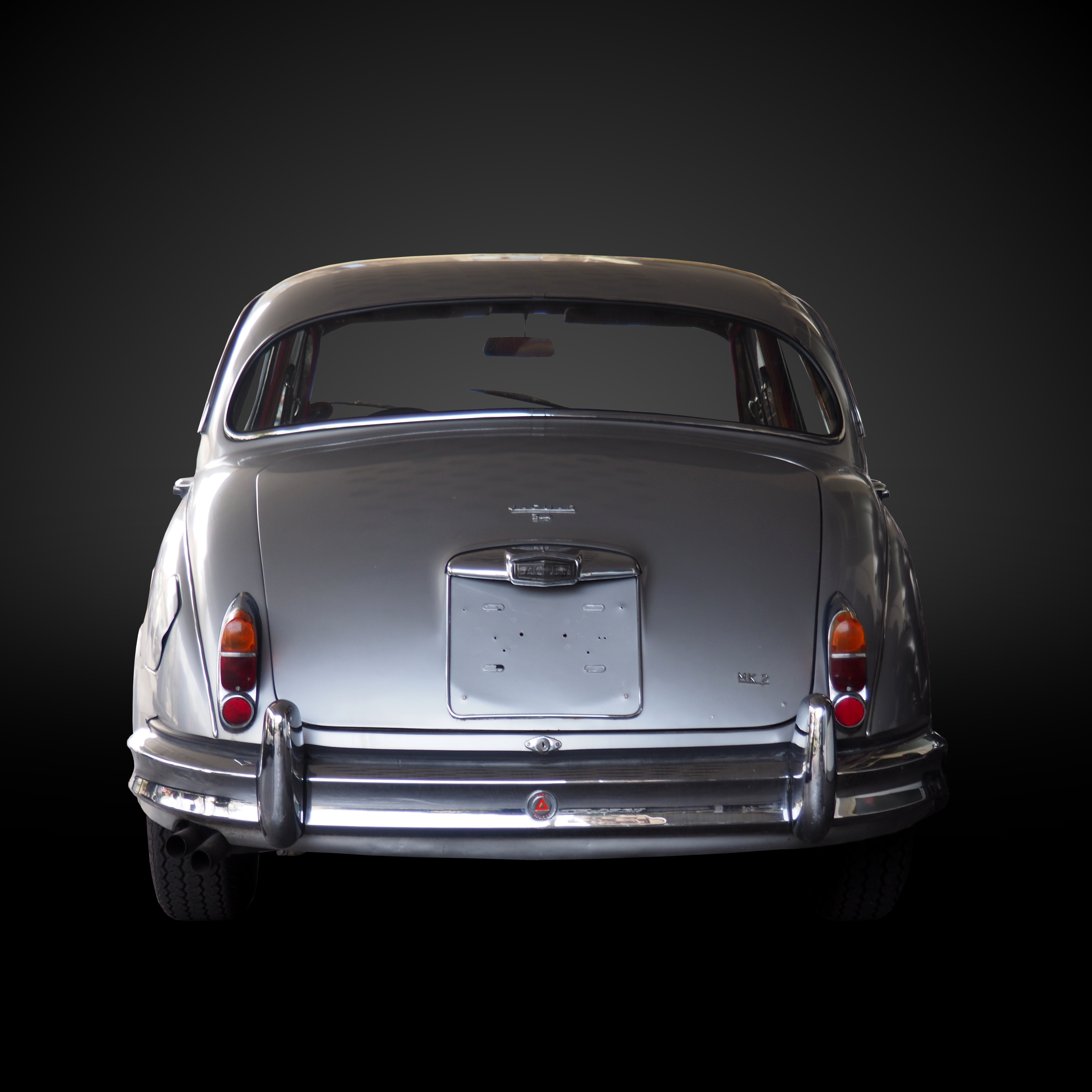

== Mechanical changes ==
The front suspension geometry was rearranged to raise the roll centre and the rear track widened. Four-wheel disc brakes were now standard. Power steering, overdrive or automatic transmissions could be fitted at extra cost. The 3.8 litre was supplied fitted with a limited-slip differential.

The Mark 2 was over 100 kg heavier than the 2.4 / 3.4 cars.

The car continued to use a live axle at the rear.

== 240 and 340 ==
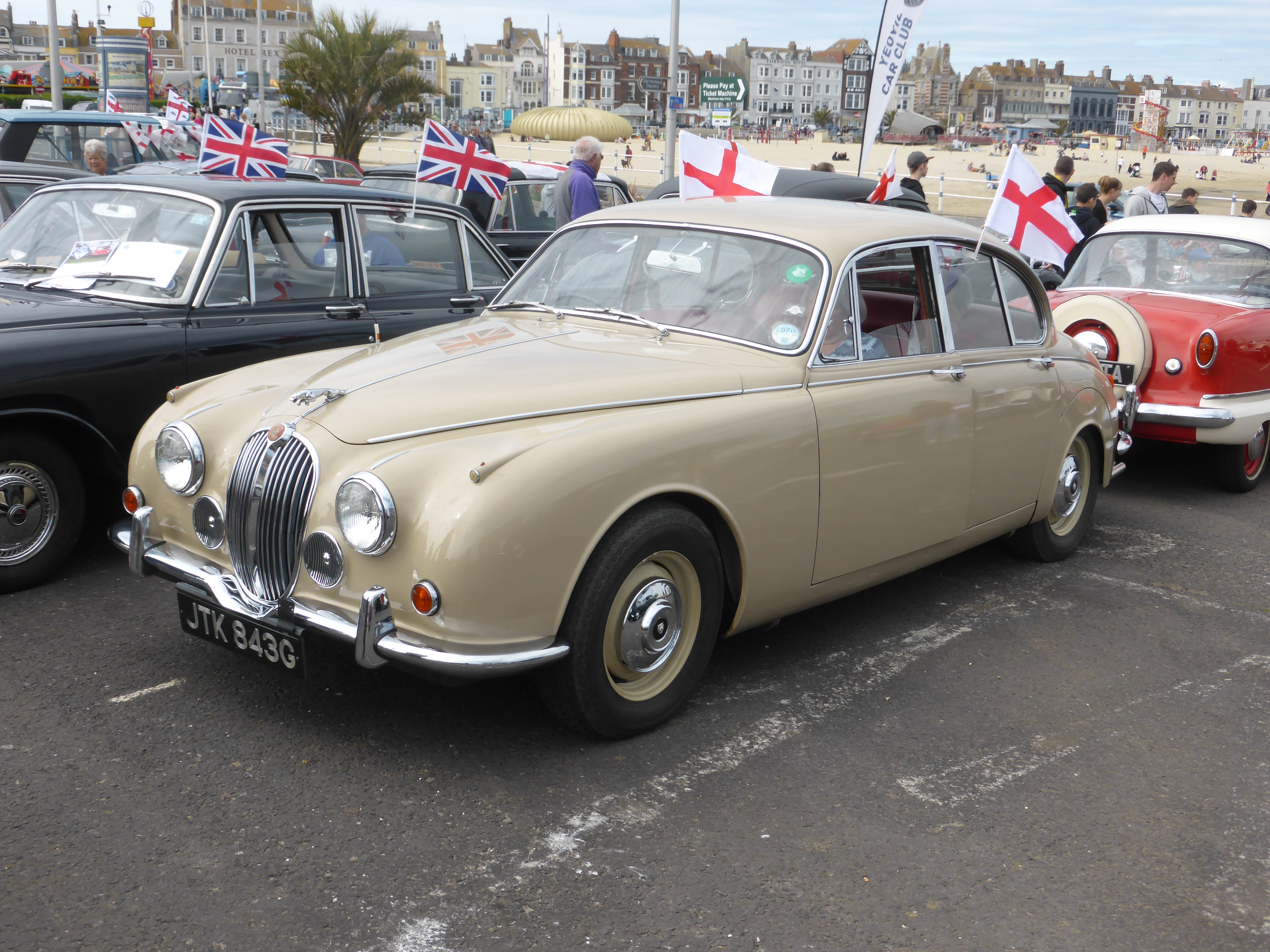
1968 Jaguar 340

Some time on or about September 1967 the 3.8 litre model was discontinued and the 2.4 and 3.4 litre Mark 2 cars were rebadged as the 240 and 340 respectively as gap-fillers until the XJ6 arrived in September 1968. The 340 was discontinued at that time, but remaining Series 2 parts were used up producing budget-priced 240s until April 1969. These sold at £1364, only £20 more than the first 2.4 in 1956.

Output of the 240 engine was increased from 120 bhp (89 kW; 122 PS) at 5,750 rpm. to 133 bhp (99 kW; 135 PS) at 5,500 rpm. and torque was increased. It now had a straight-port type cylinder head and twin HS6 SU carburettors with a new inlet manifold. The automatic transmission was upgraded to a Borg-Warner 35 dual drive range. Power steering by Marles Varamatic was now available on the 340. Both Models continued to fit the Dunlop 6.40H15 Crossply tyres as standard. 185VR15 Pirelli Cinturato was the radial alternative. Servicing intervals were increased from 2,000 miles (3,200 km) to 3,000 miles (4,800 km). There was a slight reshaping of the rear body and slimmer bumpers and over-riders were fitted. For the first time the 2.4 litre model could exceed 100 mph, resulting in a slight sales resurgence.

The 240 and 340 models retained cost-saving downgrades that had appeared a year earlier in the Mark 2 series. Standard leather upholstery was replaced by Ambla, a leather-like synthetic material, and tufted carpet was used on the floor. The front fog lamps were replaced with circular vents and made optional for the UK market. The sales price was reduced to compete with the Rover 2000 TC.

== Production ==
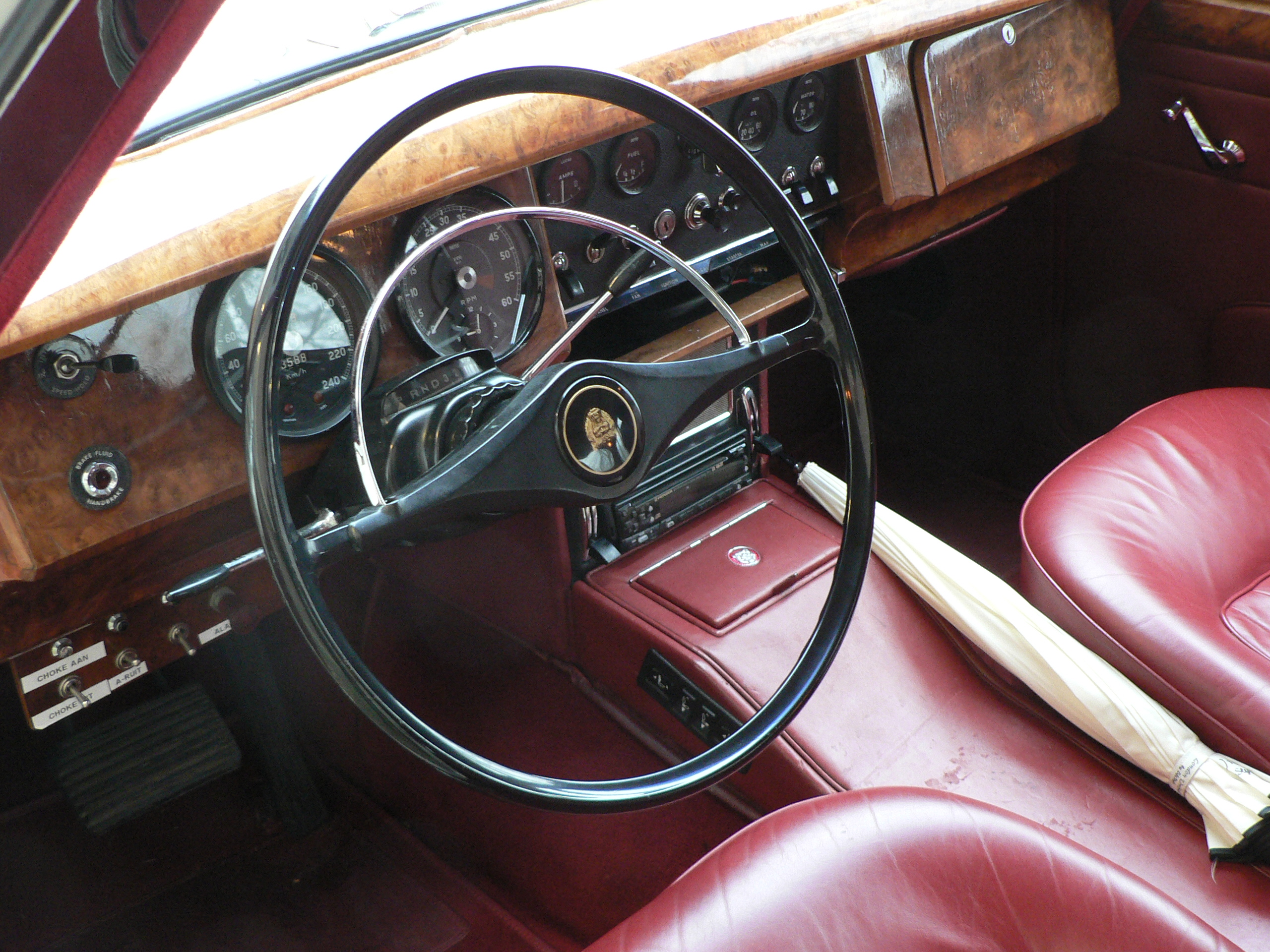
The Mark 2 interior remained luxuriously appointed with Jaguar's characteristic burr walnut

Mark 2: 83,976 produced between 1959 and 1967, split as follows:

2.4 litre – 25,173
3.4 litre – 28,666
3.8 litre – 30,141

240 and 340: 7,246 produced between 1967 and 1969, split as follows:

240 – 4,446
340 – 2,788
380 – 12 (not a standard production option)

The XJ6 was introduced in September 1968.

== Performance ==
A 3.4 litre with automatic transmission tested by The Motor magazine in 1961 had a top speed of 119.9 mph (193.0 km/h) and could accelerate from 0-60 mph (97 km/h) in 11.9 seconds. A touring fuel consumption of 19.0 miles per imperial gallon (14.9 L/100 km; 15.8 mpg_{‑US}) was recorded. The test car cost £1951 including taxes of £614.

A 3.8 litre with the 220 bhp engine was capable of accelerating from 0-60 mph (97 km/h) in 8.5 seconds and could reach a top speed of 125 mph (201 km/h).

== Motorsport ==
- Bob Jane won the 1962 Australian Touring Car Championship driving a 3.8 litre Mark 2.
- Michael Parkes and Jimmy Blumer won the 1962 The Motor Six Hours International Saloon Car Race driving a 3.8 litre Mark 2.
- Peter Nöcker won the 1963 European Touring Car Challenge driving a 3.8 litre Mark 2.
- Bob Jane won the 1963 Australian Touring Car Championship driving a 3.8 litre Mark 2 (fitted with a 4.1 litre engine).
- Roy Salvadori and Denny Hulme won the 1963 Brands Hatch 6 Hours driving a 3.8 litre Mark 2.

== Daimler 2.5 V8 and V8-250 ==
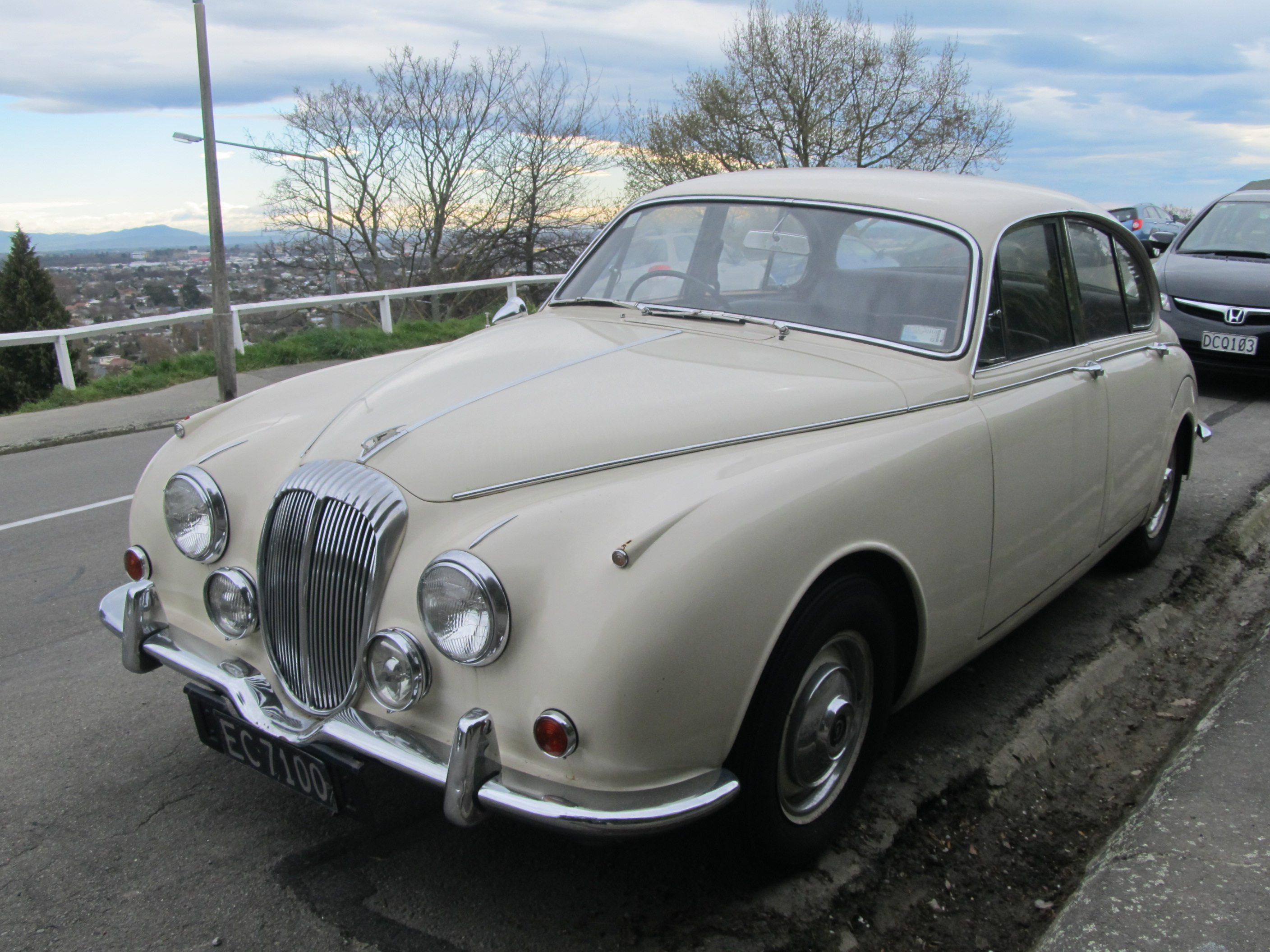
1969 Daimler V8-250, showing Daimler grille fluting

Jaguar also marketed from 1962 to 1969 a distinctive Daimler version of the Mark 2 branded Daimler 2.5 V8 fitted with Daimler's 142 bhp (106 kW; 144 PS) 2½-litre V8. In late 1967 it was re-labelled V8-250 when the Mark 2 became the Jaguar 240. As well as being significantly more powerful than the inline 6-cylinder 2.4-litre XK, the more modern Daimler engine was shorter and also lighter by about 150 lb (68 kg). This significant reduction in mass over the front wheels and redistribution of weight to the rear reduced understeer during hard cornering.

These cars were externally identified by Daimler fluting at the top of the radiator grille and the top of the rear number plate lamp cover, their smoothness, and the sound of their V8 engine. They were given distinctive interior fittings.

== Legacy ==
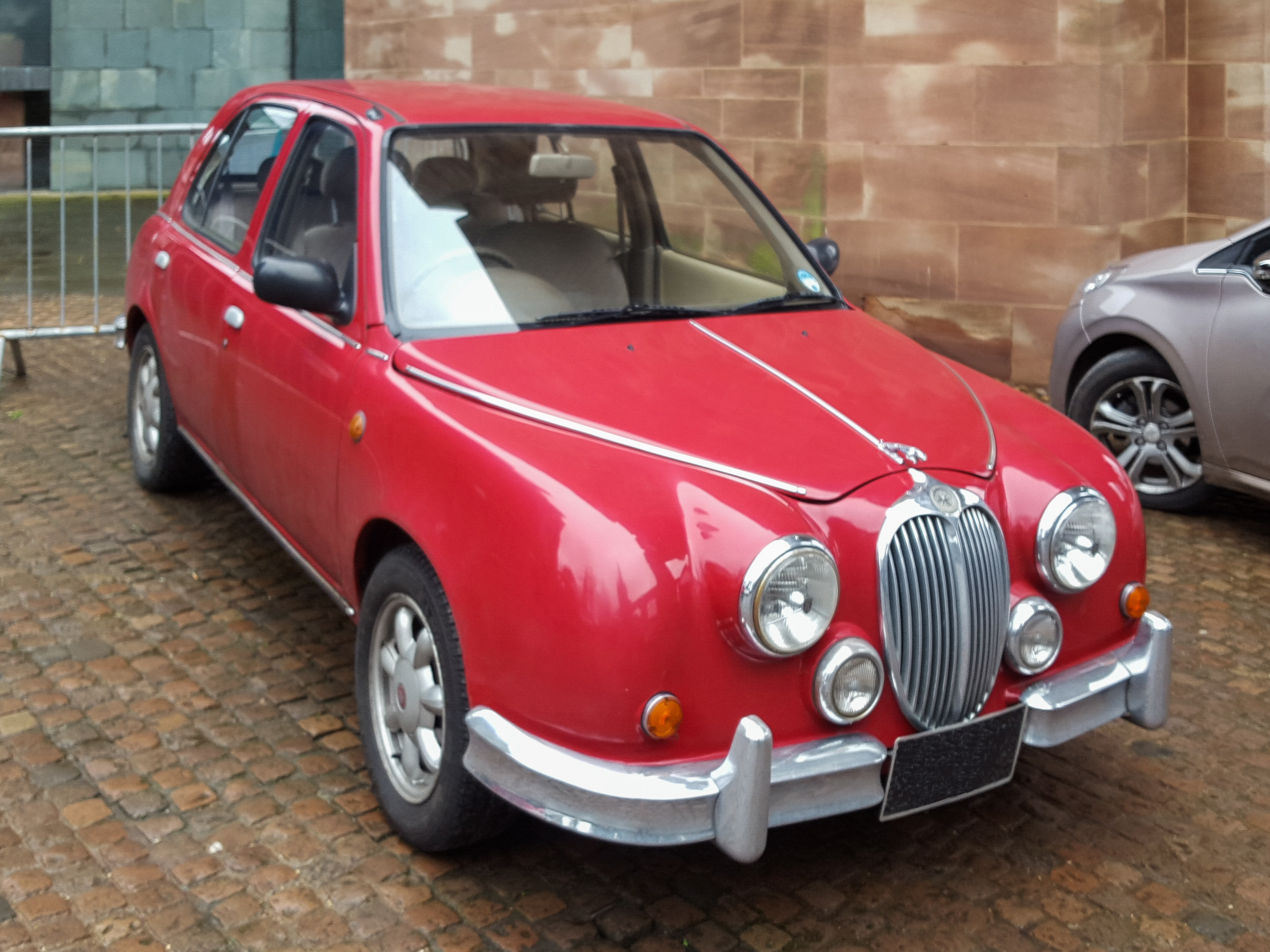
1994 Mitsuoka Viewt, inspired by the design of the Jaguar MK2

The Mark 2's body lines, derived from the Mark 1, and overall layout proved sufficiently popular over time to provide inspiration for the second-generation Jaguar S-Type, a nostalgia model introduced in 1999. Brendan McAleer of the Globe and Mail described the 2015 Jaguar XE as the Mark 2's spiritual descendant.

Japanese automaker Mitsuoka Motors produced the Viewt in 1994, a subcompact hatchback with Jaguar MK2 features.

== Portrayal in media ==
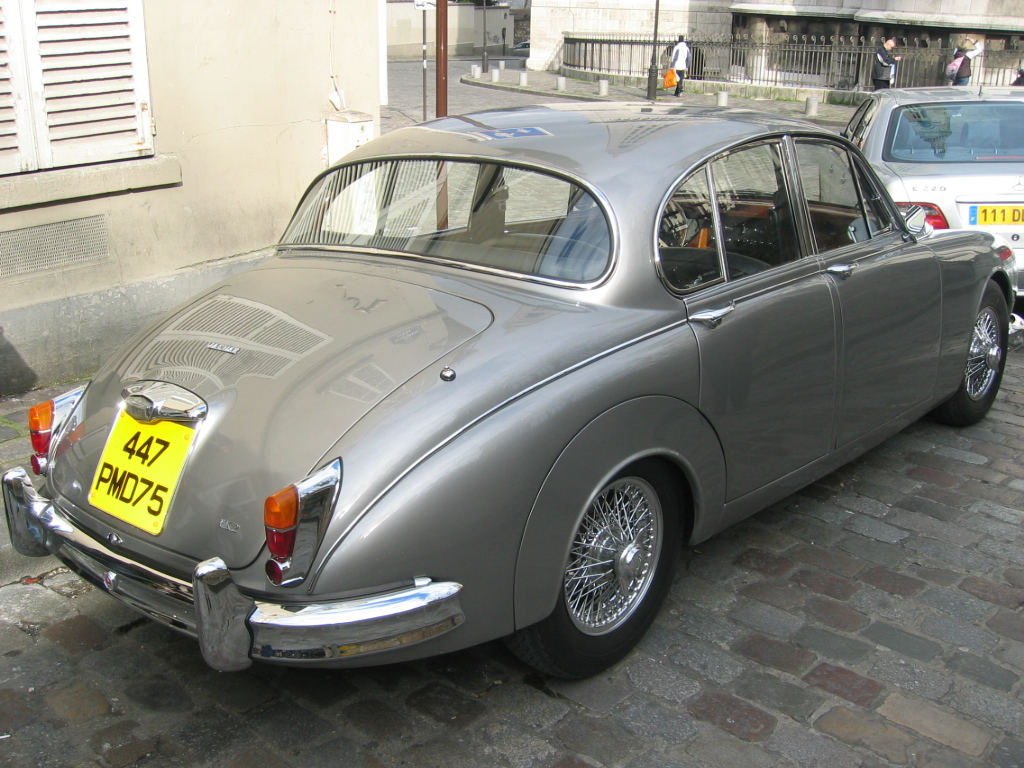
Jaguar Mark 2, on French Paris plates

The Mark 2 gained a reputation as a capable car among criminals and law enforcement alike; the 3.8 litre model being particularly fast with its 220 bhp (164 kW) engine driving the car from 0-60 mph (97 km/h) in 8.5 seconds and to a top speed of 125 mph (201 km/h) with enough room for five adults. Popular as getaway cars, they were also employed by the police to patrol British motorways.

A Regency red 1960 Mark 2 was used by Detective Chief Inspector Morse throughout the Inspector Morse television series. The car was given away in 2002 in a competition after the ending of the series and, after resales, in November 2005 was sold for more than £100,000.
