= Appendix J Touring Cars =

Motor racing category

Appendix J Touring Cars was an Australian motor racing category for modified, production based sedans. It was the premier form of Touring car racing in Australia from 1960 to 1964.

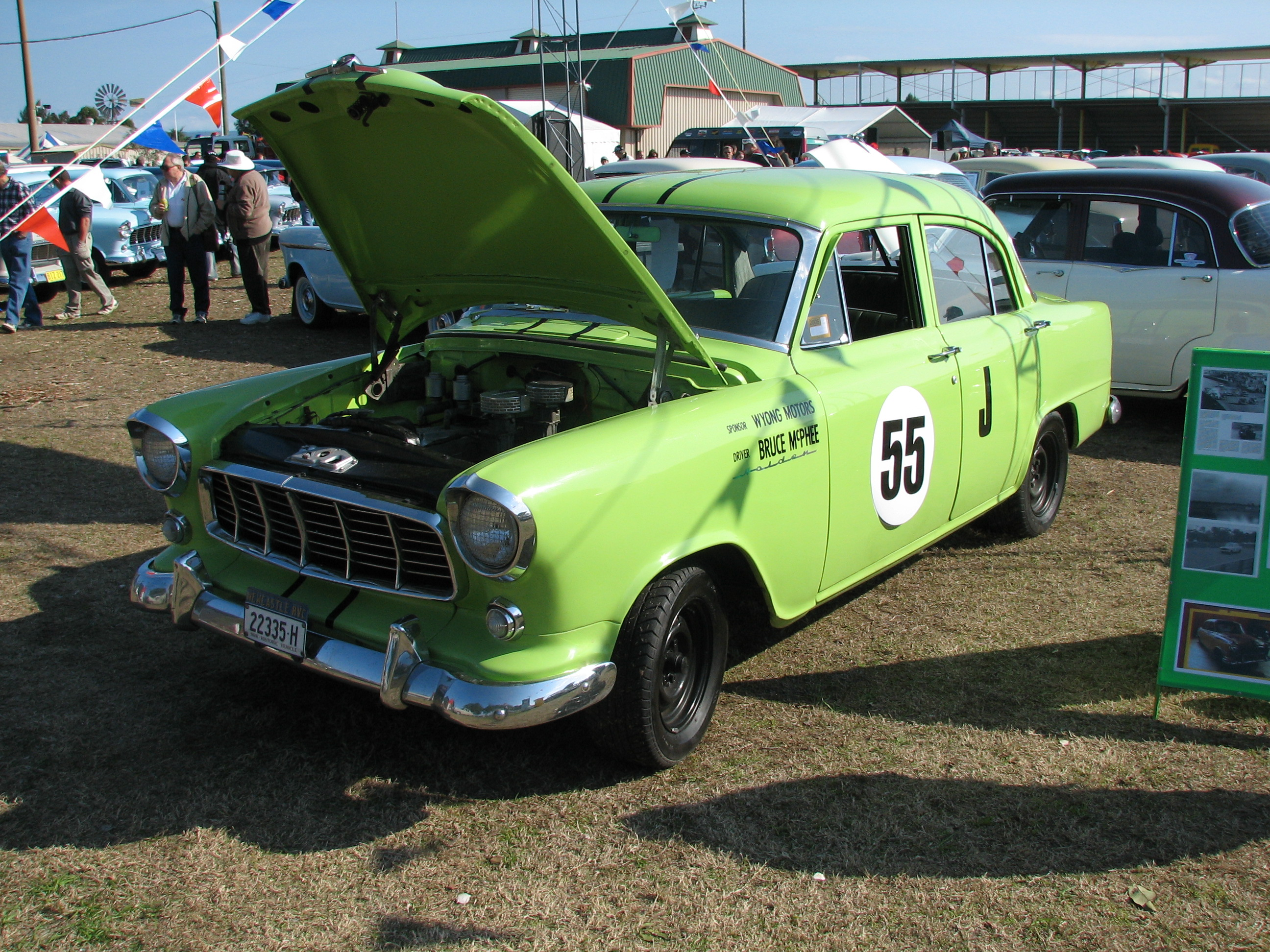
A reproduction of the Holden FE raced by Bruce McPhee in Appendix J Touring Car races

The category was introduced by the Confederation of Australian Motor Sport to take effect from January 1960. Prior to the introduction of Appendix J, there had been no national regulations for touring car racing in Australia with individual race promoters applying differing rules regarding eligibility and modification of the cars being raced. Under Appendix J, eligibility was restricted to closed cars with seating for four persons and at least one hundred examples of the model had to have been produced. Bodywork and interior trim had to remain virtually standard; however, engines and suspensions could be modified to improve performance and handling. Modifications were permitted in the areas of carburettors, valves, pistons, camshafts, inlet systems, exhaust systems, springs and shock absorbers. Cars competed in numerous classes based on engine capacity with the regulations allowing an increase in capacity up to the limit of the relevant class. Many highly modified cars which were no longer eligible to compete as Touring Cars found a home in another new CAMS category, Appendix K. This was ostensibly for GT cars but in reality allowed virtually any form of closed vehicle to participate

The Australian Touring Car Championship was open to cars complying with Appendix J from its inception in 1960 up to and including the 1964 title. The inaugural Australian Touring Car Championship race at Gnoo Blas circuit at Orange, New South Wales on 1 February 1960 was in fact the first race to be staged for Appendix J cars.

From January 1965, Appendix J was replaced by a new category, Group C for Improved Production Touring Cars.

In 1981 CAMS introduced the Group N Touring Cars category which was intended to recreate the style of racing which had existed under the Appendix J rules. Originally Group N was restricted to cars manufactured before January 1965; however, this was later extended to permit models produced up to the end of 1972.
