= Abbey Panels =

Defunct coachbuilding company

Abbey Panels Ltd
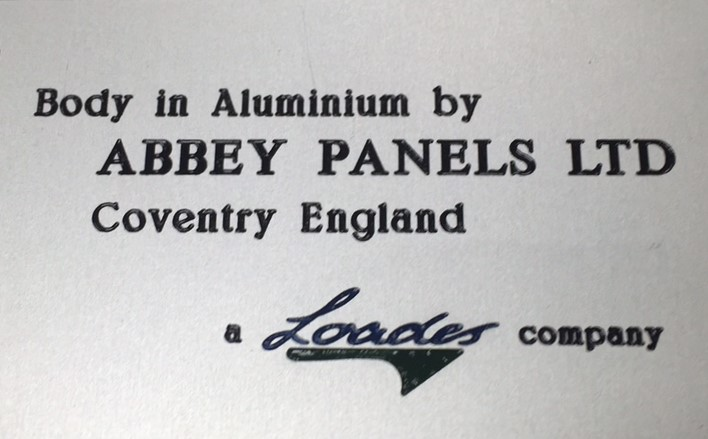
- Industry: Automotive and Aerospace
- Founded: 1941; 85 years ago (as The Abbey Panel & Sheet Metal Co. Ltd.)
- Founders: Edward Loades FRSA; Les Bean; Bill Woodhall; Ernie Wilkinson (Company Secretary)
- Headquarters: Exhall, Coventry, U.K.
- Key people: John Carolan, Engineering Director
- Products: Coachbuilder
- Website: www.loades.com

Abbey Panels Ltd., originally The Abbey Panel & Sheet Metal Co. Ltd., was a Warwickshire-based coachbuilding company founded on Abbey Road, Nuneaton in 1941, initially assembling Supermarine Spitfires for the ongoing war effort. The original partners were Edward Loades, Les Bean, Bill Woodhall and Ernie Wilkinson. As the business grew they expanded to Old Church Road, Coventry before having their main manufacturing plant on the well known Bayton Road Industrial Estate in Exhall. In 1967, Ted Loades listed the business on the London Stock Exchange (LSE) and it became known as Loades PLC, with Abbey Panels its main brand, alongside Albany Zinc (castings), Loades Dynamics (machining) and Loades Design (automotive styling) (previously known as Descartes Design). The company specialised in producing handmade prototype car bodies and did so for many notable car companies including: Bristol Cars, Lea Francis, Jaguar Cars, Rover, MG, Healey, Rolls-Royce, Buick, Lincoln, Volvo and BMW amongst others. They fashioned the bodywork of cars such as the Le Mans winning Ford GT40, numerous Jaguars (XK120, C-type, D-type, E-type, XJ13, XJ220, XK180), the original Mark I Land Rover Station Wagon, Jim Clark's Lotus 38 and Stirling Moss's 1957 Pescara Grand Prix winning Vanwall. They also produced many specialist parts for the aerospace industry, particularly for Rolls-Royce plc, such as the Rolls-Royce Pegasus engine duct of the Harrier jump jet.

In 2002 the company stopped much of its manufacturing and began a phased closure of the Abbey Panels plant in Coventry. They continued to run their aerospace engineering and machining company for some time, and refocused their efforts on redeveloping their industrial properties.

== Gallery ==
An advert in 'The Autocar' (1956).

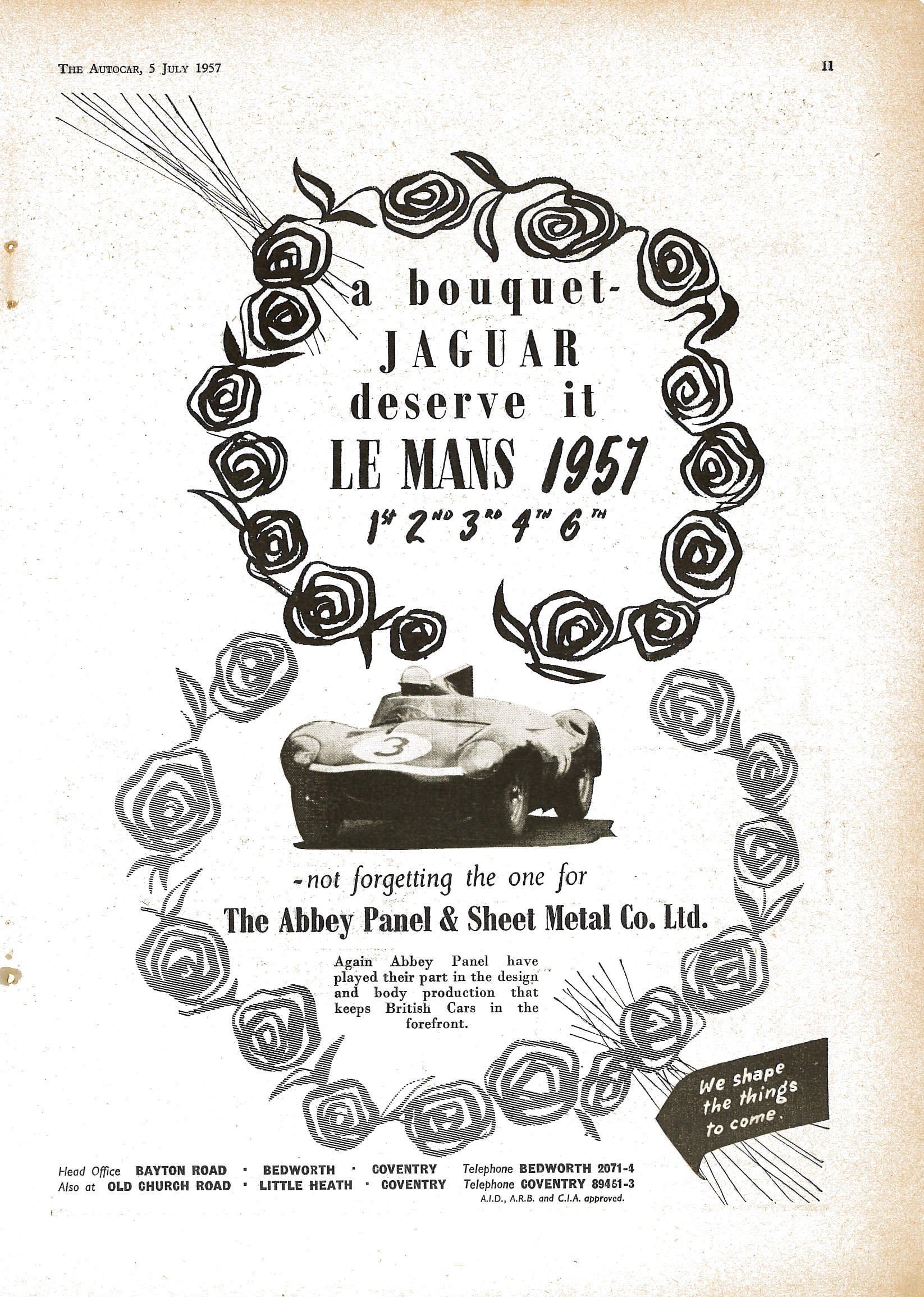
'The Autocar' advert (1957).

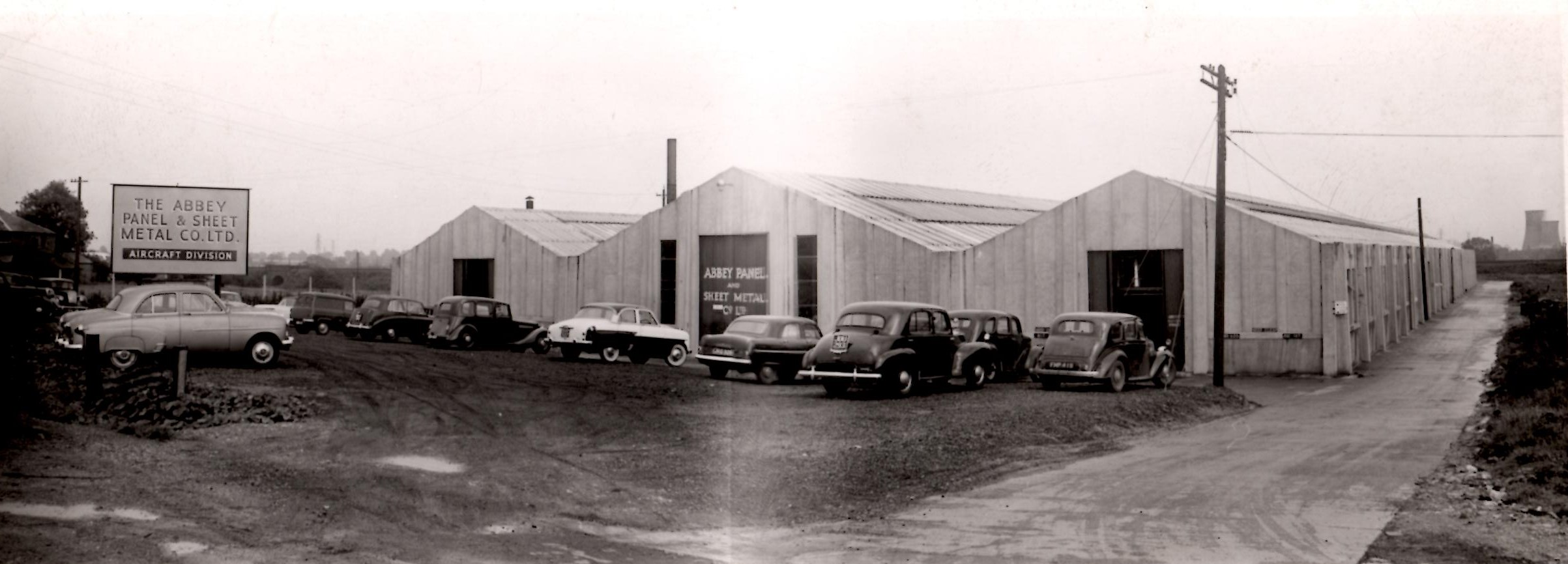
Abbey Panel and Sheet Metal Co. factory on Bayton Road.

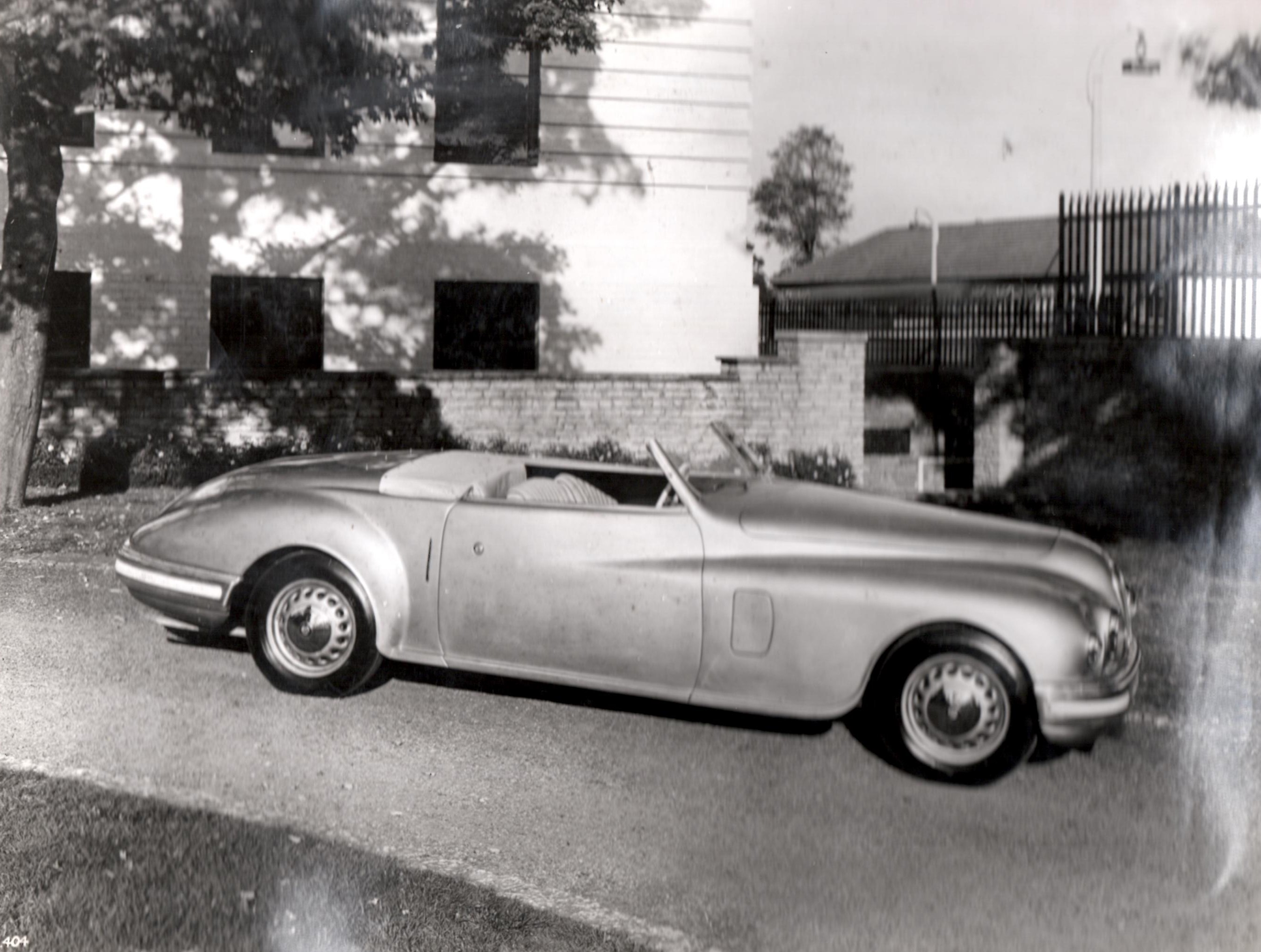
Bristol 402 Roadster (1949).

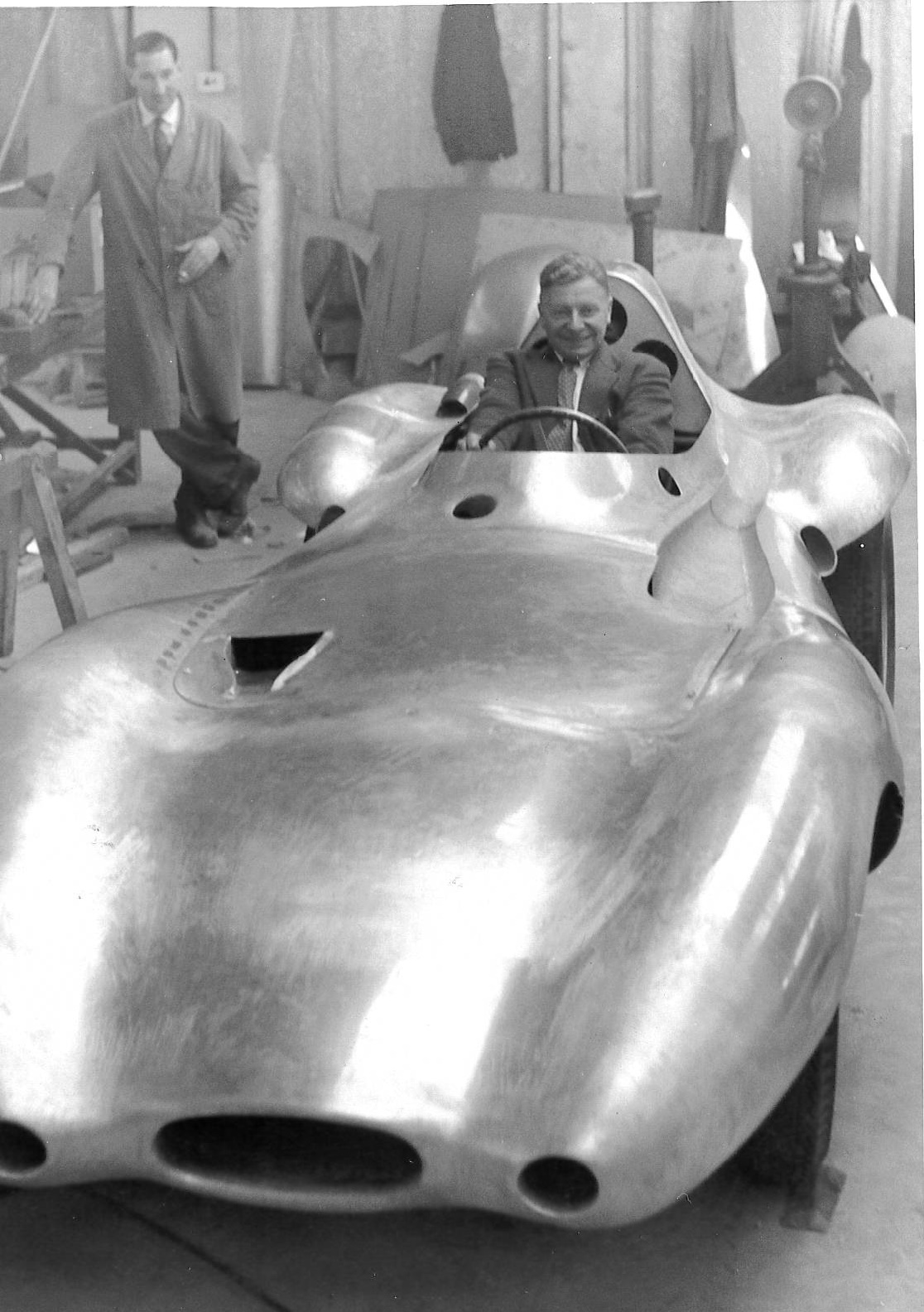
Founder Bill Woodhall sat in a Vanwall VW6 Streamliner at Abbey Panels (c.1956).

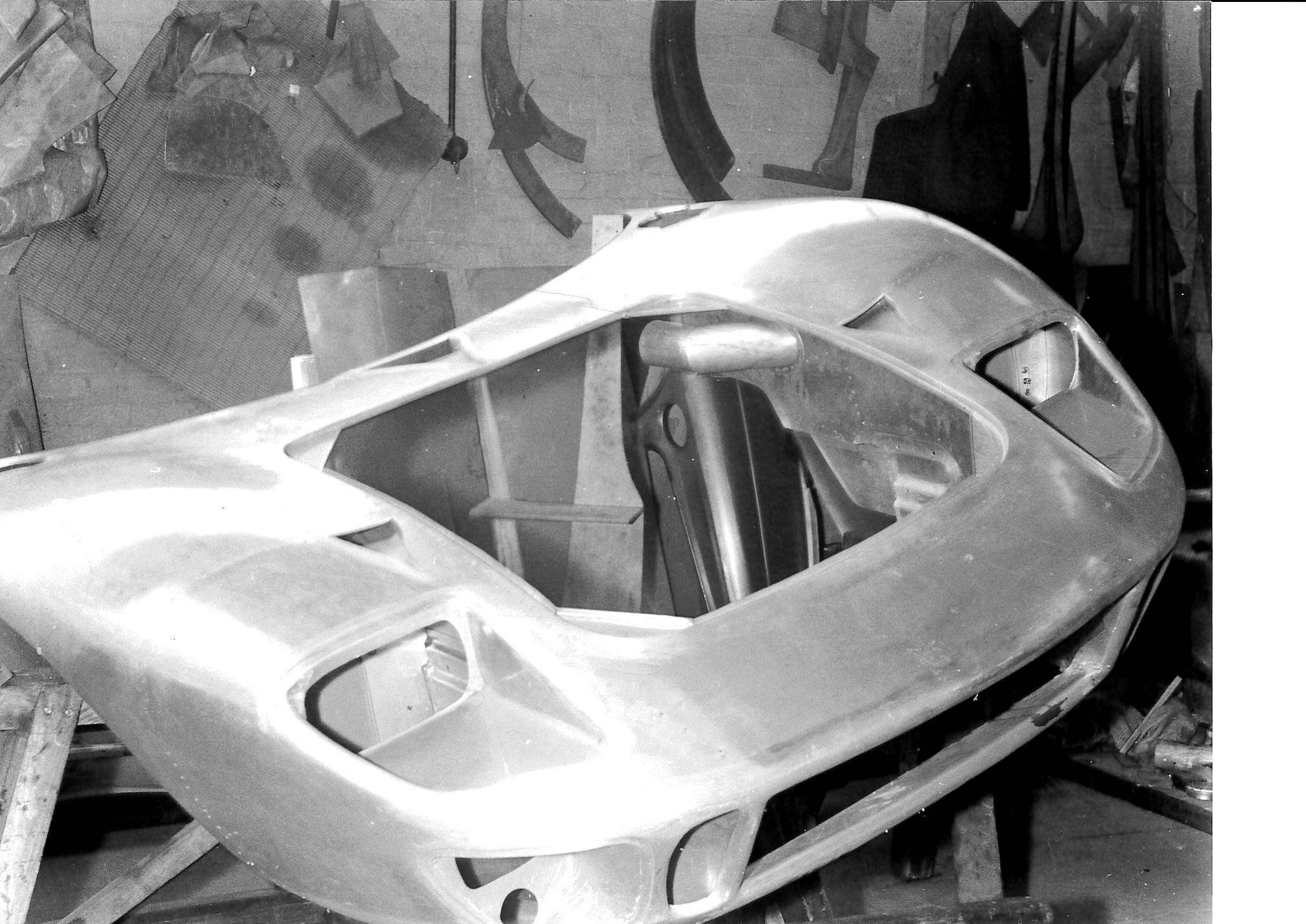
Ford GT40 bonnet at Abbey Panels (1960s).

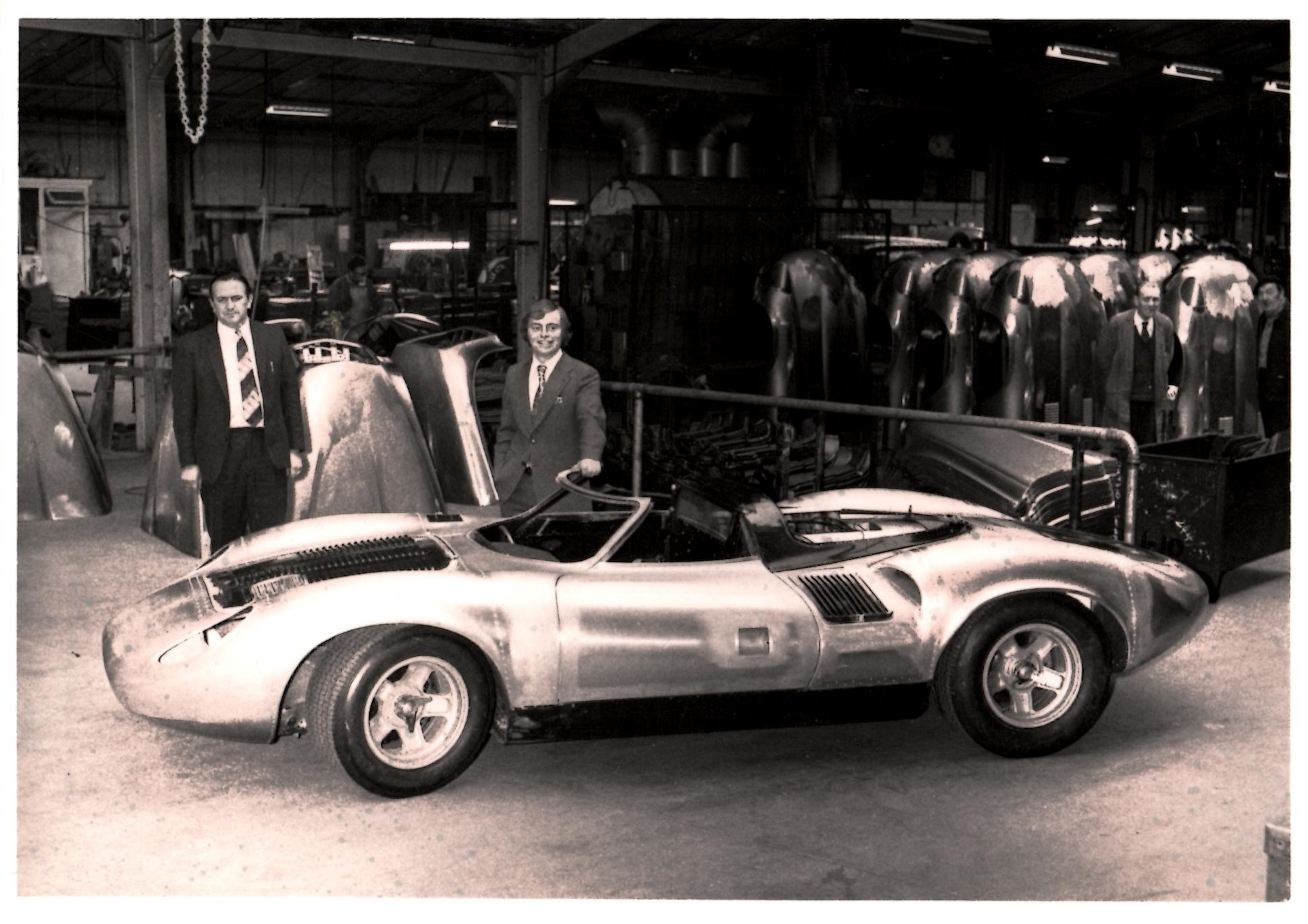
Rebuilding the XJ13 (c. early 1970s).

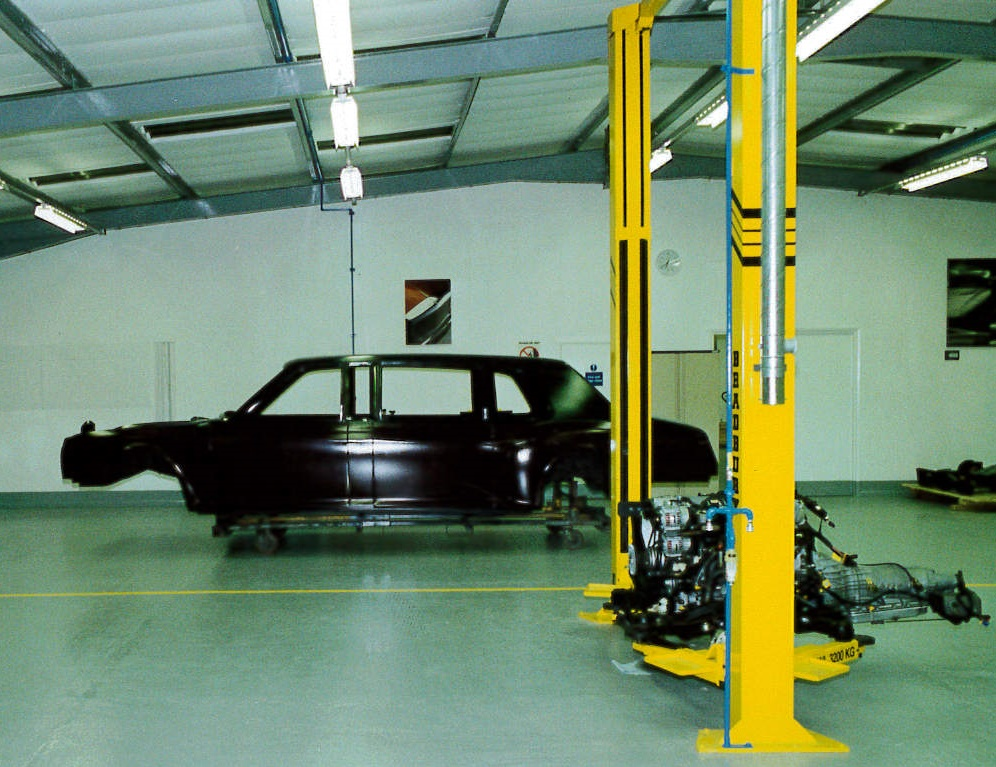
Sultan of Brunei's Rolls-Royce Phantom Majestic (1990s).

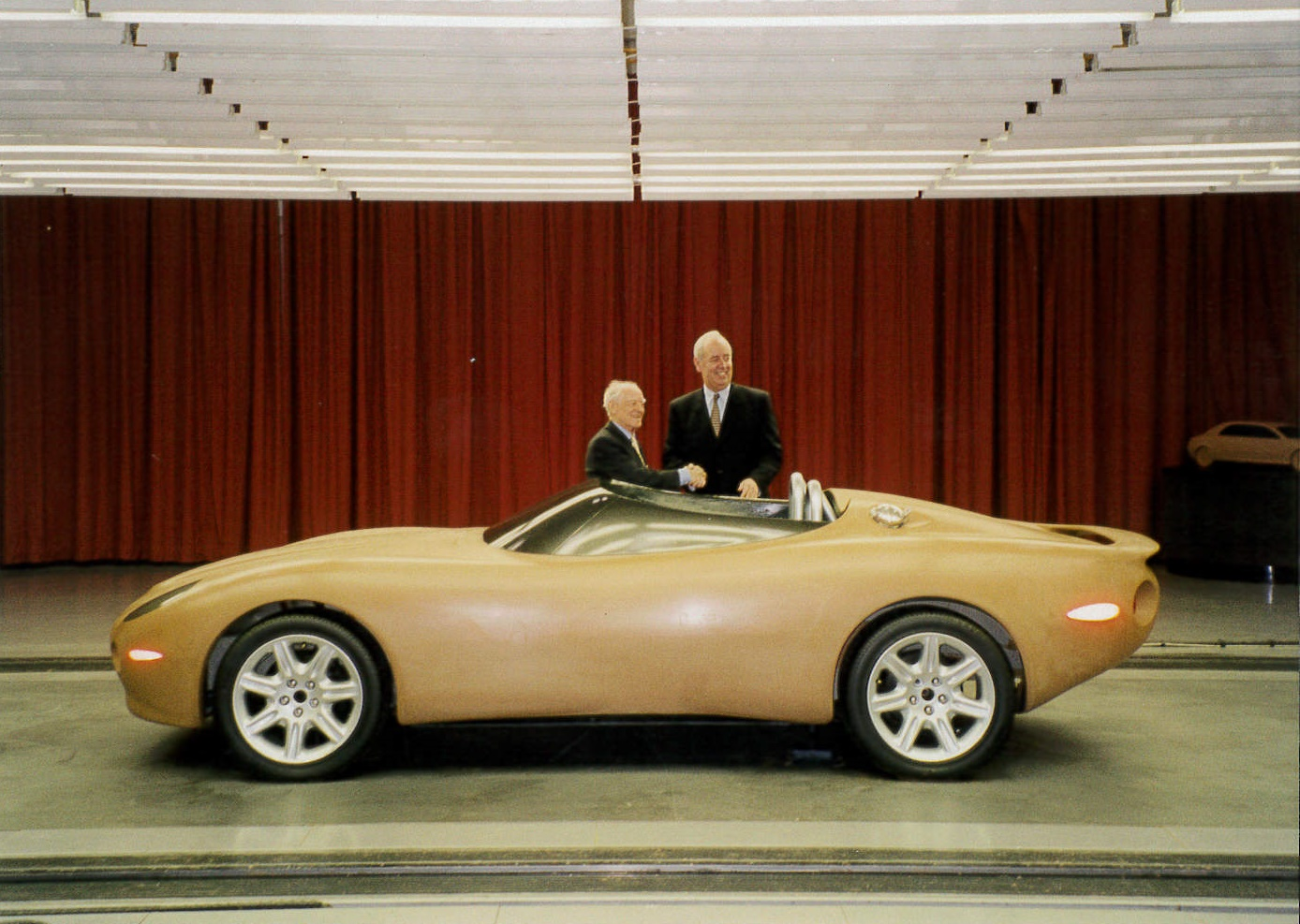
Ted Loades with Ford COO, Sir Nick Scheele and Jaguar XK180 concept (1997).
