= Bill Pitt (racing driver) =

- Nationality: (Australia) Australian
- Born: William Pitt; 15 December 1926 Brisbane, Qld., Australia
- Died: 23 February 2017 (aged 90) Caloundra
- Retired: 1963

Australian Touring Car Championship
- Years active: 1960–62
- Wins: 1
- Best finish: 1st in 1961 Australian Touring Car Championship

Championship titles
- 1961: Australian Touring Car Champ.

William Pitt (15 December 1926 – 23 February 2017) was an Australian racing driver and motor racing official.

For most of his racing career, Pitt was associated with Jaguars, competing with XK120 and D-Type sports cars, a Mark VIII rally car and a Mark 1 touring car with the assistance of Queensland's Jaguar agents Cyril and Geordie Anderson of Westco Motors.

Pitt first became involved in racing as an official at the 1948 Australian Grand Prix, but gradually moved into competing himself. By the mid-1950s, he was a front running sports car driver. Pitt co-drove a Jaguar XK120 to a four lap victory in what for 48 years was Australia's only 24-hour motor race, the 1954 Mount Druitt 24 Hours Road Race, driving with Geordie Anderson and Charles Swinburne.

In 1956, Anderson purchased a Jaguar D-Type in which Pitt placed fourth behind two factory-entered Maseratis and a Ferrari in the Australian Tourist Trophy at Albert Park in November of that year. The car was badly damaged the following weekend, but was rebuilt and, with Pitt driving, became the dominant feature of Australian sports car racing. Frequently, because of his domination of sports car racing, Pitt raced the D-Type against Grand Prix type machinery in search of competition, finishing third in the 1957 Queensland Road Racing Championship, a race which counted towards the 1957 Australian Drivers' Championship.

The D-Type was sold in 1959 and Pitt and Anderson next invested in a Jaguar Mark 1 Saloon to race in the growing touring car category. After finishing second behind David McKay in the 1960 Australian Touring Car Championship, Pitt became the first Queenslander to win the title, achieving the victory at his home circuit, Lowood, in 1961.

Pitt retired from racing in 1963 but continued in his role as a Queensland representative of the National Control Council of the Confederation of Australian Motor Sport until 1964.

== Career results ==
Year	Title	Position	Car
1956	Australian Tourist Trophy	4th	Jaguar D-Type
1957	Australian Drivers' Championship	12th	Jaguar D-Type
1957	Victorian Tourist Trophy	3rd	Jaguar D-Type
1958	Victorian Tourist Trophy	3rd	Jaguar D-Type
1959	Australian Tourist Trophy	2nd	Jaguar D-Type
1960	Australian Touring Car Championship	2nd	Jaguar 3.4 Litre
1961	Australian Touring Car Championship	1st	Jaguar 3.4 Litre
1962	Australian Touring Car Championship	2nd	Jaguar 3.4 Litre
1962	Australian GT Championship	3rd	Jaguar 3.4 Litre

Sporting positions
Preceded by David McKay	Winner of the Australian Touring Car Championship; 1961	Succeeded by Bob Jane
