= 1962 Australian GT Championship =

Motorsport competition

Seasons
- ← 1961 1963 →

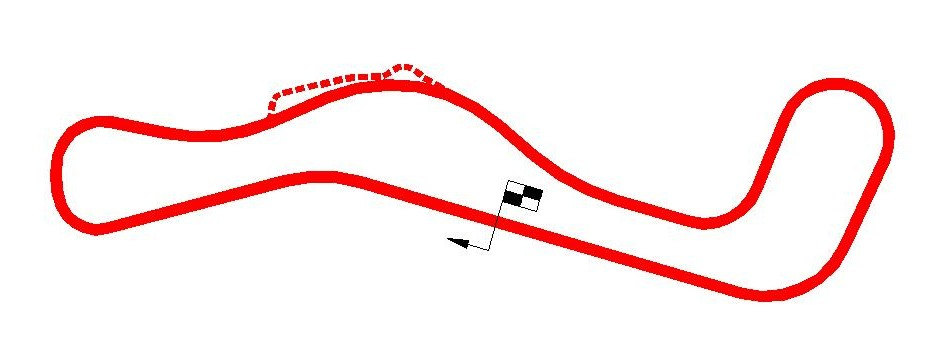
Layout of the Lakeside International Raceway

The 1962 Australian GT Championship was a CAMS sanctioned motor racing title for drivers of Appendix K GT cars. The title, which was the third Australian GT Championship, was contested over a single race held at the Lakeside circuit, in Queensland, Australia on 8 July 1962.

The championship was won by John French driving a Centaur Waggott.

== Results ==
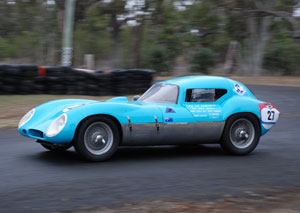
The race winning Centaur Waggott, pictured in 2007

Position	Driver	No.	Car	Entrant	Laps
1	John French	26	Centaur Waggott	GP Cars Racing Team	50
2	Tony Basile	31	Porsche Carrera	S Sakzewski	50
3	Bill Pitt	34	Jaguar 3.4 Litre	Mrs DI Anderson	50
4	Les Howard	21	Austin-Healey Sprite - Ford Cosworth	Howard and Sons Racing Team	
5	Brian Foley	7	Lotus Elite	Scuderia Veloce	
Under 1000cc
1	Sib Petralia	51	Austin-Healey Sprite	Chequered Flag Racing Team	
2	Terry Kratzmann	30	Renault Floride	Sqadra Sotto	
?	M. Hunt	6	Renault Dauphine		
1000cc to 1600cc
1	Tony Basile	31	Porsche Carrera	S Sakzewski	50
2	Les Howard	21	Austin-Healey Sprite - Ford Cosworth	Howard and Sons Racing Team	
3	Brian Foley	7	Lotus Elite	Scuderia Veloce	
?	Tony Osborne	16	Lotus Elite		
?	Paul Fallu	60	Volkswagen Karmann Ghia		
1600cc to 2600cc
1	John French	26	Centaur Waggott	GP Cars Racing Team	50
2	Ken Peters	4	Derrington Wolseley 15/60	KA Peters	
2600cc and Over
1	Bill Pitt	34	Jaguar 3.4 Litre	Mrs DI Anderson	50
2	Dennis Geary	22	HWM Jaguar GT	Geary's Sports Cars	

=== Race statistics ===
- Pole position: John French (Centaur Waggott), 1m 15.6s
- Race distance: 50 laps, 75 mile (120 km)
- Number of starters: 14
- Number of finishers: Not yet ascertained
- Race time of winning car: 62m 03.6s
- Fastest lap: John French, 1m 12.3s
