= X21 =

X21 may refer to:

- X.21, a telecommunications standard
- X21 (group), a Japanese girl idol group
- X21 (New York City bus)
- Northrop X-21, an experimental aircraft
- SA-X-21, a Russian anti-aircraft weapon system
- TGOJ X21, a Swedish electric multiple unit
- ThinkPad X21, a notebook computer
- Banham X21, a kit car from Banham Conversions
