= Banham Conversions =

British kit car manufacturer

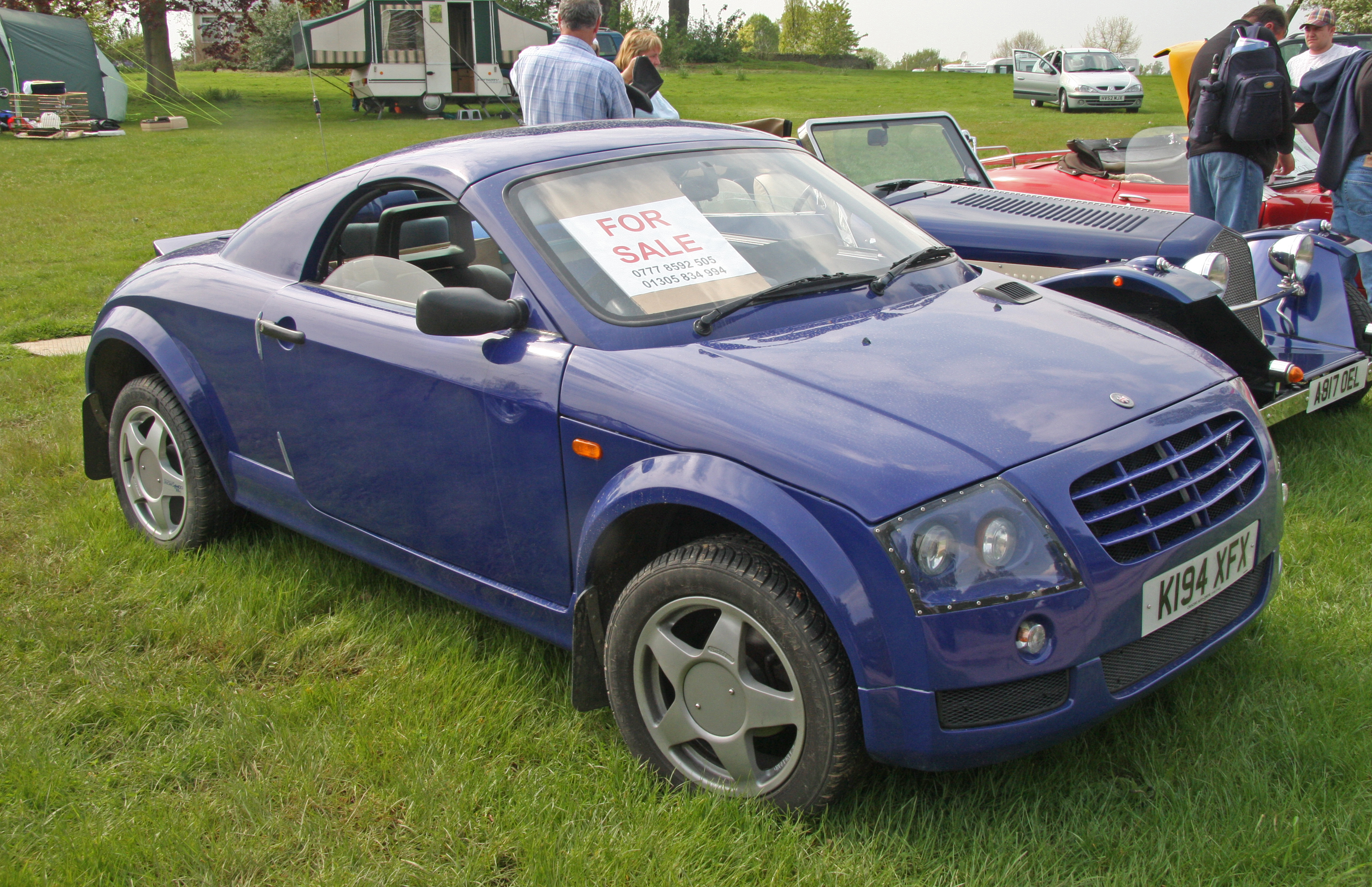
Banham X99

Banham Conversions was a coachbuilder and manufacturer of kit cars from the late 1970s until 2004. The company, based in Rochester, Kent, was founded by Paul Banham and started off as a coachbuilder, converting vehicles into convertibles. The company built convertible versions of high-end vehicles such as the Ferrari 400, Aston Martin DBS and V8, and the Rolls-Royce Corniche during this time.

In the 1990s, the company moved on to selling conversion kits to the general public. These were mainly based on British cars, such as the classic Mini, Austin/Rover Metro, Jaguar models and the Austin Maestro. Non-British manufacturers used for Banham kit cars included Skoda and BMW.

Kits were sold up to the mid-2000s, when the Banham Conversions ceased production of all models, splitting the company's then-current model range between two separate buyers.

== Vehicles ==
=== Banham XJ-SS ===
From 1994, Banham marketed a coach built service to rebody the Jaguar XJS into a more modern and slender shape using components from current models such as the Vauxhall Corsa and Ford Mondeo. In 1996, the company moved into offering "kits" for the first time now selling the full GRP body kit to fit and paint at home.

=== Banham 130 Spyder ===
The Banham 130 Spyder was based on the rear-engine Škoda Estelle and Rapid platform, and was a replica of the Porsche 550 of James Dean fame. The model proved to be one of Banham's most popular, as these two Skoda models were very cheap and easy to find at the time.

=== Banham 200 ===
After the end of Group B, Ford put the factory body panel moulds for their Ford RS200 up for sale, and they were bought by Paul Banham with the intent to produce the most accurate replica possible of the cutting-edge rally car.

Searching for a relatively cheap existing car to base this new Banham model on, he found that the Austin Maestro had the same wheelbase as the RS200, allowing for a cheap yet fast replica to be produced when an MG Maestro 2.0 or Turbo was used as the donor model. Despite the low price and high sporting potential, the Banham 200 naturally received criticism for having completely the wrong drivetrain layout. The Maestro - and by extension, the Banham product - used a front-engine, front wheel drive layout while the Ford used a mid-engine, four-wheel drive setup.

=== Banham X99 ===
The X99 was previewed to the public in March 1999 in various kit car magazines, and released shortly after to great acclaim by reviewers and journalists. Receiving particular praise were the styling, the range options and the low price of the kit - with the basic coupe package only costing £1395.

The only model available at launch was a fixed head coupe, but other models of the X99 were released by November including a full convertible and a 'Targa-style' removable roof option.

The X99 was based on the popular Austin/Rover/MG Metro, with the build process involving removing the roof and other bodywork, adding stiffeners and then fitting the replacement GRP bodyshell. Sales were excellent, with over 300 kits sold in the first six months of 1999 - but by 2000, VAG got involved and threatened legal action over the design, citing similarities to the Audi TT.

=== Banham X21 ===
The X21 was shown to the public for the first time on the Banham Conversions website on 1 January 2000, allowing the company to boast that it was "the first car of the new Millennium", beating the Rover 45's reveal by three days.

Despite the fanfare, the X21 was merely a X99 with slightly altered styling to differentiate it from the Audi TT. This proved enough to appease VAG, with the new headlights ironically coming from the VW Lupo.

In 2003, an X21 coupe was produced using the existing X99 moulds with new lights and other details, this was named the X21 GT.

=== Banham Superbug ===
The Superbug was planned to be an entry-level kit that anyone could build, and to this end it was designed as an X21 variant with no doors, no roof, no rear window, amongst other small changes to simplify the build process. The car was originally to be named the 'SB2000', but was renamed to Superbug for production.

The company claimed that this new model was a spiritual successor to the Mini Moke, and in a similar manner to the Moke, a basic roof frame and roof with zipped sides were offered to provide weather-proofing.

The basic 'starter kit' for the Superbug started as little as £995, but for all the extras to finish the car it would cost £1495. In 2000, this was the cheapest kit car on sale and it therefore sold very well for the four years it was on sale.

=== The 'New Speedster' ===
The company would capitalise on its earlier success with its '130 Spyder' with a new Porsche replica, this time inspired by the Porsche 356. but had slightly different styling and a shorter wheelbase to an original 356. Unlike the 130 Spyder (but like the X99/X21/Superbug range), this model was based on the Metro.

=== Banham Redina ===
Around 2000, a prototype was built using a similar rear-engine Skoda chassis as the earlier 130 Spyder, although with a body closer to the Porsche 356. It used the headlights from the first-generation Ford Ka, but the extent of any further part sharing is unknown as both information and photos of the vehicle are hard to come by. A single Paul Banham Conversions-branded advert and several press photos are all that survive of the Redina, with the advert being the only way of knowing the vehicle's manufacturer due to the lack of physical badging on the car.

=== Banham Bat ===
Paul Banham's final Metro kit was the Banham Bat, which was designed to look far bolder than their earlier Metro-based models. Due to both the styling and the name, the Bat has often been compared to the Batmobile - typically in a mocking way. The large, upright front grille has also provoked comparisons with the Bugatti Veyron, again often in a derogatory manner.

The Bat was launched in early 2002 with two models: buyers could either have a traditional coupe or option a removable 'Targa-style' roof panel. The model was not successful however, failing to match the sales of the more conventionally-styled X99 or X21 models on the same platform.

=== Banham Sprint ===
By far one of the most popular kits offered by Banham was the Sprint, designed to be a close replica of the first-generation Austin-Healey Sprite. The vehicle used the chassis of the classic Mini, making it front wheel drive instead of the rear wheel drive like the original. Another difference to the Sprite - but a similarity to Banham's other models - was that the bodyshell was fibreglass.

=== Banham Mini Roadster ===
Paul Banham's final design was also based on the classic Mini, and was far closer in spirit to the company's earliest models in that it was a convertible conversion of an existing production car. The prototype was shown to the public in 2001 and used blended GRP panels and roll over hoops for the roadster styling.

Unlike the previous Banham cars this was a coach built service, so donor vehicles would be taken to the Banham factory to be converted rather than supplied as a kit.

=== Banham 120 ===
One of the last designs advertised by Paul Banham conversions was a replica of the Jaguar XK120 convertible, and like the Banham Mini Roadster this was a not sold as a kit but instead as a coach built vehicle. It was produced using (at the time) fairly modern 1990s BMW parts, but looked like an original XK120 on the outside.

== Ending of production ==
By 1998 much of the kit car market had fallen. After the introduction of the SVA test, the SVA was introduced by the British Government to regulate the kit car industry and regulate the quality of kits produced for and by customers before they could take to the road, the SVA was very strict compared to previous kit cars only needing to pass a MOT and cost up to £450, without passing a SVA test you couldn't register your car to drive it legally on the road.

Banham Conversions kit car models avoided all this as the kits were considered bodyshell conversions which avoided the need for a SVA test but the DVLA caused problems as it was mentioned in a 2003 issue of "which kit? magazine" that some DVLA officers were not allowing owners of Banham kits to register their vehicles without a SVA test first, while other DVLA officers were allowing them to be registered without. This lasted until 2004 when VOSA/DVLA decided the modifications needed to create a Banham kit car was more than a bodyshell swap and needed a SVA, and all kits were discontinued after the company was sold to Rally Sport Replicas Ltd. They sought to create a new design of chassis for the previous models, but they ceased trading in early 2005 after little was achieved and no kits sold.

The New Speedster design was excluded from the sale to Rally Sport Replicas Ltd because the design and tooling were instead sold to 356 Sports during 2006. Like Rally Sport Replicas Ltd, they also ceased trading shortly after.

After the company's sale, Paul Banham would go on to produce a Jaguar XJ-S-based replica of the Jaguar XK180 concept under a separate company. He later began to restore & create new classic wood rim steering wheels, offered under his Myrtle Ltd company.
