= Jaguar XK 180 =

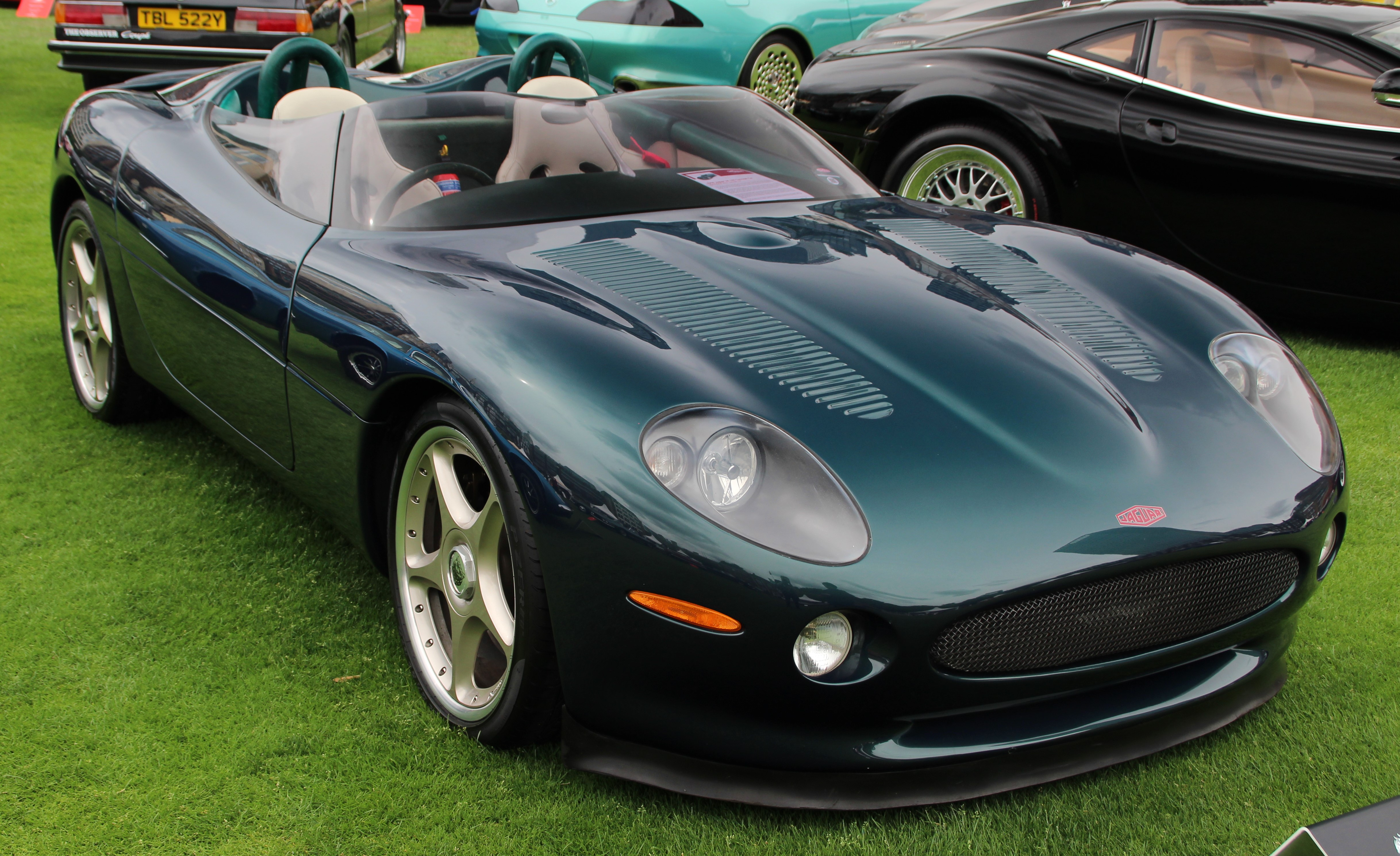
- XK 180 at the 2022 London Concours.

Overview
- Manufacturer: Jaguar Cars
- Production: 1999; 2 built
- Designer: Keith Helfet

Body and chassis
- Class: Concept car
- Body style: 2-door roadster
- Layout: FR layout
- Related: Jaguar XK (X100)

Powertrain
- Engine: 4.0 litre supercharged V8
- Transmission: 5-speed automatic

Dimensions
- Wheelbase: 2,461 mm (96.9 in)
- Length: 4,417 mm (173.9 in)
- Width: 1,821 mm (71.7 in)
- Kerb weight: 3,450 lb (1,565 kg)

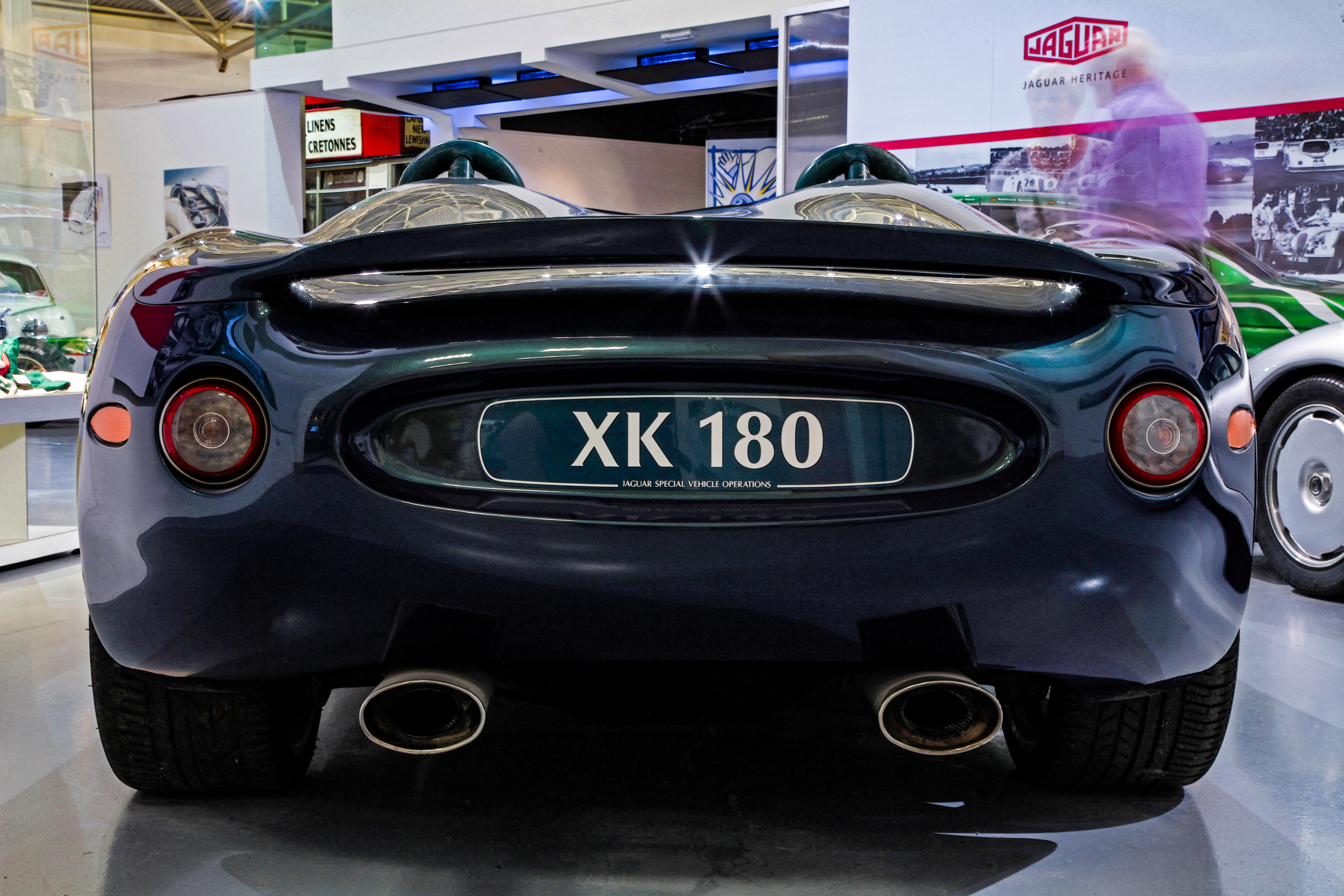
Rear view

The Jaguar XK 180 is a concept car created by the British car manufacturer Jaguar Cars to celebrate the 50th anniversary of the XK car and to show the world the skills of Jaguar stylists, craftsmen and engineers. It was presented at the Paris Motor Show in 1998.

== Design ==
The XK 180 was designed by Jaguar's Special Vehicle Operations division over a period of 10 months to celebrate 50 years of Jaguar's XK cars. It took inspiration from the Jaguar C-Type and D-Type of the 1950s.

The handcrafted aluminium body was built by Abbey Panels, a Coventry based company which had previously collaborated with Jaguar on many occasions.

== Specifications ==
It had a 4.0 litre supercharged V8 engine with four valves per cylinder, developing 450 bhp (336 kW; 456 PS) and 445 lb⋅ft (603 N⋅m) of torque. Power is sent to the rear wheels through a Mercedes five-speed automatic gearbox which has been modified to be controlled by buttons on the steering wheel. Seating capacity was two. It had a claimed top speed of 180 mph (290 km/h), although this was never tested, and it could accelerate from 0-100 km/h (62 mph) in 4.5 seconds. It was capable of covering a 1/4 mile (400 m) in 13.5 seconds at 106 mph (171 km/h). Two XK 180s were built in total, one in RHD and one in LHD. Both were roadsters.

== Handling ==
The handling pack used in this car was Computer Active Technology Suspension (CATS), which was also used on the Jaguar XKR. These enhancements include revised electronic control unit settings and revised damper settings for taut, dynamic handling as well as uprated springs and anti-roll bars for increased roll stiffness. The pack also includes a retuned variable ratio, speed-sensitive steering system.

The XK180 suspension is based on that of the XKR, with racing-style aluminium shock absorbers incorporated in the coil spring/damper units. The suspension was developed with assistance from ride and handling experts at Jaguar's Engineering Centre in Whitley.

== Brakes ==
Brakes were Brembo units, measuring 14.001 in | 355.6 mm in the front and 12.001 in | 304.8 mm in the rear.

== Wheels and tyres ==
The wheels of the car were made by BBS, fitted with Pirelli P Zero tyres (265/35 ZR20 P Zero Direzionale at the front and 285/30 ZR20 P Zero Asimmetrico at the rear). The rims were 9 inches wide x 20 inches in diameter (front) and 10 inches wide x 20 inches in diameter (rear). The first car built in 1998, was fitted with BBS Paris wheels, while the second (LHD, 1999) car had BBS Detroit wheels.

== Replica ==
There are some companies that offer to convert regular Jaguar XJS/XK8/XKR cars to replicas of the XK180. Autobedrijf de Koning BV, a Netherlands-based firm, is one of the most well known producers of XK 180 replicas. One of their replicas was offered for sale in 2017 with an asking price of 235,000 euros ($272,000). The replica was built in 2015 on the chassis of a 1985 Jaguar XJ-SC and produces 230 hp (172 kW).
