= 1954 Mount Druitt 24 Hours Road Race =

The 1954 Mount Druitt 24 Hours Road Race was an endurance race for production cars staged at the Mount Druitt circuit in New South Wales, Australia from 31 January to 1 February 1954. The race, which was organized by the Australian Racing Drivers' Club, was the first motor race of 24 hours duration to be held in Australia. Cars were required to be stock models, competing as purchased with no modifications permitted other than the removal of the silencer. All starters finished the race, with those that had retired rejoining to cross the finish line at the end of the 24 hours.

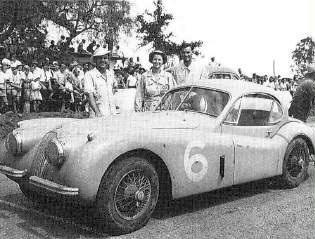
The winning Jaguar XK120 Coupe

The race was won by Geordie Anderson, Chas Swinburne and Bill Pitt driving a Jaguar XK120 Coupe.

== Results ==
Position	Drivers	No.	Car	Entrant	Class pos.	Class	Laps
1	Geordie Anderson; Chas Swinburne; Bill Pitt	6	Jaguar XK120 Coupe	Mrs. C. Anderson	1	Closed Cars 3001 cc and Over	573
2	Gordon Greig; Bill Reynolds; Peter Vennermark	4	Bristol 400	Sports Cars Pty. Ltd.	1	Closed Cars 1501 – 3000 cc	569
3	Tom Sulman; Nat Buchanan; J. A. Masling	10	Humber Super Snipe	T. N. Sulman			563
4	Dick Shaw; J. H. Shaw; R. E. Long	12	Holden 48/215	R. D. Shaw			547
5	John Crouch; J. Dowling; David McKay	23	Peugeot 203	Harden Johnston Pty. Ltd.	1	Closed Cars 1101 – 1500 cc	546
6	R. M. Daniel; P. Spring; B. Polaine	18	MG TC	R. M. Daniel	1	Open Cars 1101 – 1500 cc	537
7	Ken Tubman; Kel Ebbeck	22	Peugeot 203	K. Tubman			528
8	Doug Chivas; Frank Dent; Peter Lowe	20	MG TD	Lowe's Service Station			491
9	John Le Foe; G. R. McColl	9	Standard Vanguard Spacemaster	Marshalls Motors Pty. Ltd.			481
10	John Nind; A. McAlpine	21	MG TD	J. P. Nind			441
11	W. Collins; K. French; N. Senior	16	MG TD	W. Collins			414
12	K. Harrison; B. Maher; J. Johnston	26	Morris Minor Tourer	K. Harrison	1	Open Cars Under 1100 cc	406
13	Reg Lewis; F. Samuels; J. H. Richards	15	Jaguar Mark V	R. Lewis			399
14	I. Boydell; M. Robinson; P. Moffitt	25	Renault 760	I. Boydell	1	Closed Cars Under 1100 cc	396
15	N. Perkins; R. Barnard; R. A. Dixon	17	Ford V8 (1938)	N. Perkins			323
16	Peter Whitehead; Tony Gaze; Alf Barrett	1	Jaguar XK120C	P. N. Whitehead	1	Open Cars 3001 cc and Over	282
17	Bill Ford; W. Hand; P. Carter	27	Singer Nine	C. H. C. Engineering Co.			245
18	John Webber; Ashton Marshall	28	Fiat 500C	J. H. Webber	2	Closed Cars Under 1100 cc	210
19	Les Cosh; Dick Cobden; Stewart Moody	2	Aston Martin DB2	L. J. Cosh			170
20	Belf Jones; Col James; G. E. Turner	7	Austin A90 Atlantic	B. J. Jones			153
21	W. Broad; W. Clarke; S. Hall	14	MG TD	W. Broad			140
22	E. Wright; B. J. Jones; L. A. Painter	11	MG TD	E. Wright			130

=== Notes ===
- Entries: 28
- Starters: 22
- Finishers: 22
- Start format: Le Mans-style
- Start time: 2pm
- Distance covered by winning car: Approximately 1,260 miles (2,029 km)
- Average speed of winning car: 53 m.p.h.
- Attendance: 15,000
- Prize money: 3,000 pounds
