= Jaguar XK120 =

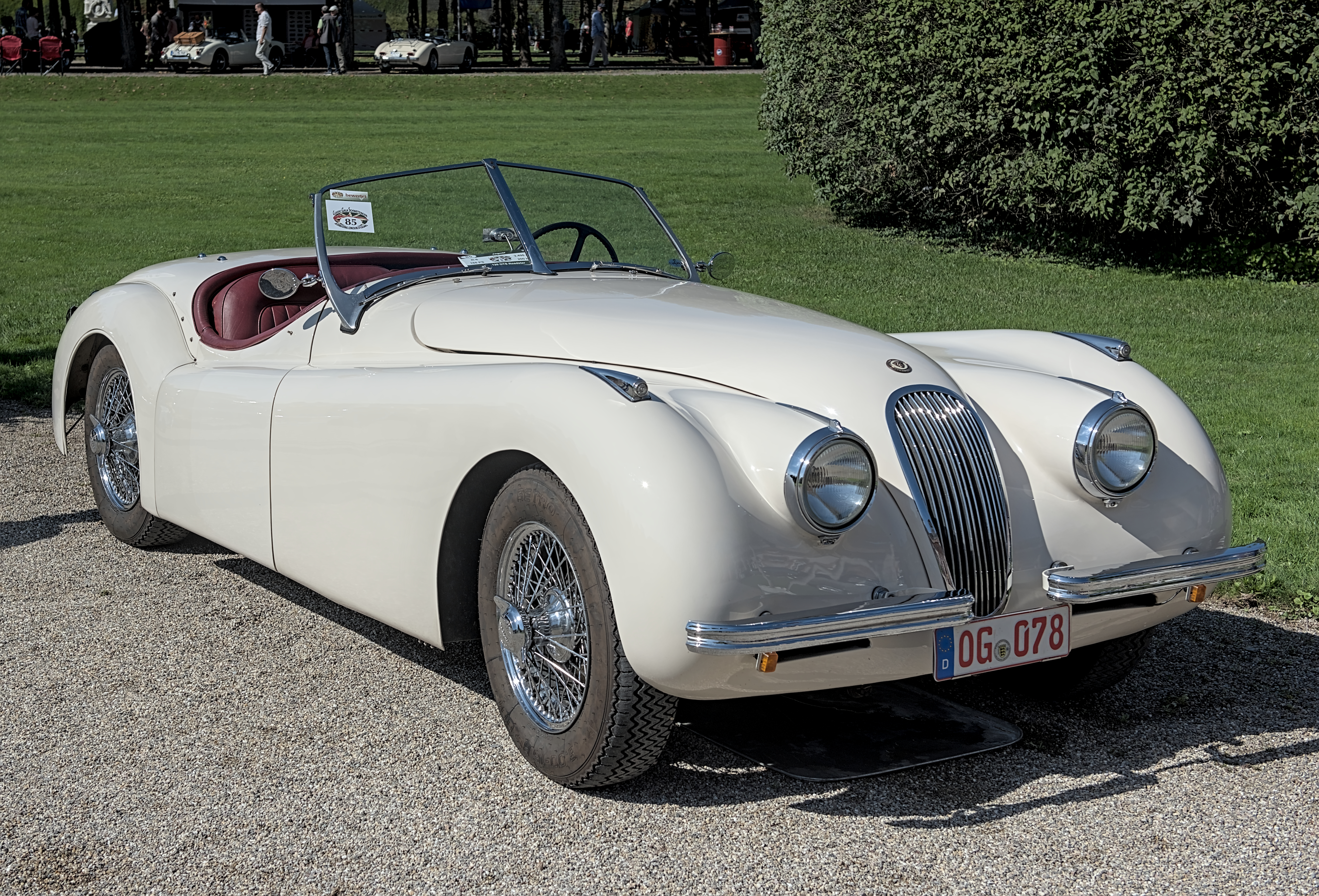
- Jaguar XK120 open 2-seater

Overview
- Manufacturer: Jaguar Cars
- Production: 1948–1954; 12,055 made
- Assembly: United Kingdom: Holbrook Lane, Coventry (1948–1951); United Kingdom: Browns Lane, Coventry (1951–1954)

Body and chassis
- Class: Sports car
- Body style: open two-seater 2-seat fixed head coupé 2-seat drophead coupé
- Layout: FR layout
- Related: Jaguar C-Type

Powertrain
- Engine: 3.4 L XK I6
- Transmission: 4-speed manual

Dimensions
- Wheelbase: 102 in (2,591 mm)
- Length: 173 in (4,394 mm)
- Width: 61.5 in (1,562 mm)
- Height: 52.5 in (1,334 mm)

Chronology
- Predecessor: SS Jaguar 100
- Successor: Jaguar XK140

The Jaguar XK120 is a sports car manufactured by Jaguar between 1948 and 1954. It was Jaguar's first sports car since SS 100 production ended in 1939. The XK120 was launched in open two-seater or (US) roadster form at the 1948 London Motor Show as a testbed and show car for the new Jaguar XK engine designed by Jaguar Chief Engineer William Heynes. The sports car caused a sensation, which persuaded Jaguar founder and Chairman William Lyons to put it into production.

The fastest production car in the world in its time, it would go on to be developed into the XK140 and XK150 models.

== History ==
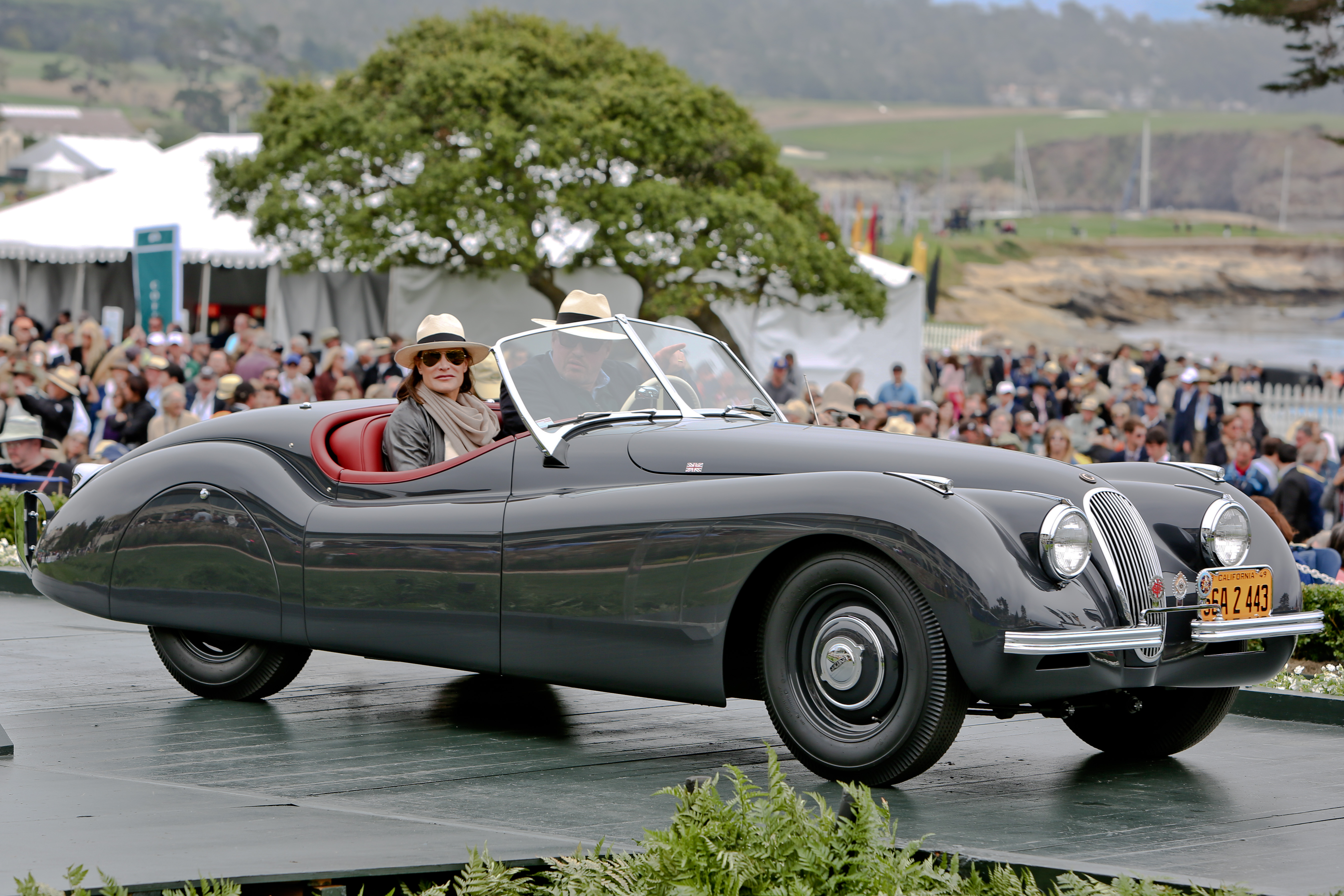
The first production XK120, chassis number 670003 originally owned by Clark Gable, at the 2012 Pebble Beach Concours d'Elegance. The XK120 was the world's fastest production car at the time of its debut.

Beginning in 1948, the first 242 cars were wood-framed open 2-seater bodies with aluminium panels. Production switched to the 1cwt or 112 lb (51 kg) heavier all-steel in early 1950. The "120" in the name referred to the aluminium car's 120 miles per hour (190 km/h) top speed (faster with the windscreen removed), which made it the world's fastest production car at the time of its launch. In 1949, the first production car, chassis number 670003, was delivered to Clark Gable.

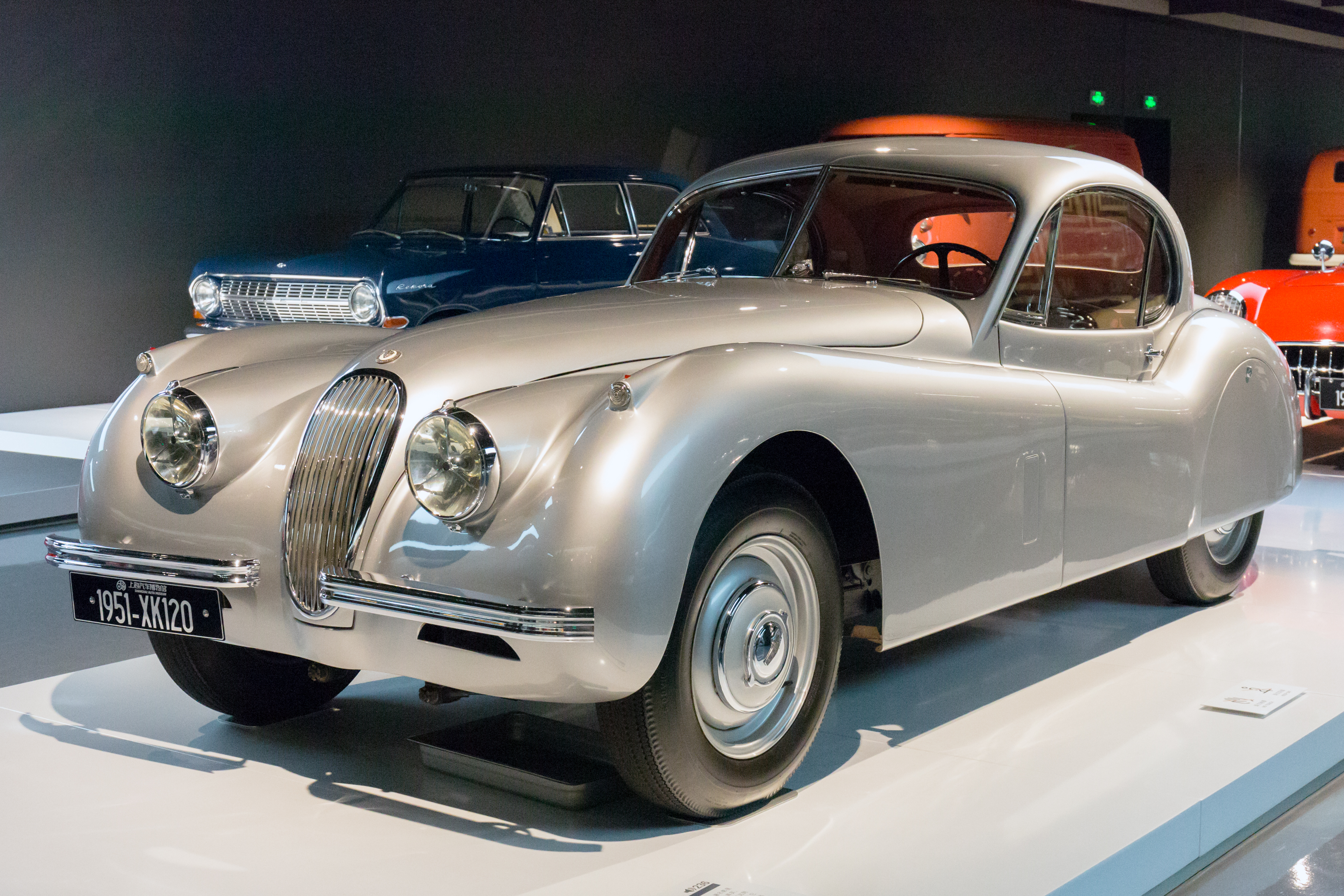
1951 XK120 Fixed Head Coupe

The XK120 was ultimately available in three body styles, all two-seaters and available either as Left (LHD) or Right Hand Drive (RHD): an open 2-seater described in the US market as a roadster (OTS); a fixed head coupé (FHC) from 1951; and a drophead coupé (DHC) from 1953. Certain Special Equipment roadster and fixed-head coupé cars were produced and sold between 1948 and 1949 as an early production run for enthusiasts, denoted by an 'S' preceding the chassis number.

A version with a smaller engine (2-litre 4-cylinder) designated the XK100 and intended for the UK market was cancelled prior to production.

On 30 May 1949, on the empty Ostend-Jabbeke motorway in Belgium, a prototype XK120 timed by the officials of the Royal Automobile Club of Belgium achieved an average of runs in opposing directions of 132.6 mph (213.4 km/h) with the windscreen replaced by just one small aero screen and a catalogued alternative top gear ratio, (Note: The Times, 31 May 1949 Ostend 30 May: British Car's Speed Record (extracts) A Jaguar 3½-litre sports car . . . travelled at a timed speed of 132 mph on the Ostend-Jabbeke motorway today . . . The runs were timed by officials of the Royal Automobile Club of Belgium . . . moreover it was running on normal Belgian pump petrol and at the end of its high speed runs it demonstrated its ability to throttle down to 15 mph in top gear and to accelerate speedily without pinking. Running with the hood up, the car averaged 126.4 mph for a mile in two runs in opposite directions. The fastest mean speed of 132.5 mph was reached with a racing windscreen in place, the best run being made at 133.2 mph. The car also covered a kilometre from a standing start at a speed of 74.1 mph and a mile at 86.4 mph.) and 135 mph (217 km/h) with a passenger-side tonneau cover in place. In 1950 and 1951, at Autodrome de Linas-Montlhéry, a banked oval track in France, open XK120s averaged over 100 mph (160 km/h) for 24 hours and over 130 mph (210 km/h) for an hour. In 1952 a fixed-head coupé took numerous world records for speed and distance when it averaged 100 mph for a week.

XK120s were also highly successful in racing and rallying.

In 2016, Bonhams sold a matching numbers left-hand-drive alloy-bodied roadster – one of only 184 – for $396,000 (£302,566). This marks the highest price achieved for an XK120 at auction thus far.

In 2026, French designer Hubert de Malherbe published Dandy Crush (Skira Editions), an illustrated personal account of restoring an XK120 that had sat in storage for 60 years until its previous owner's death, with a preface by Laurent Kleitman.

== Construction ==
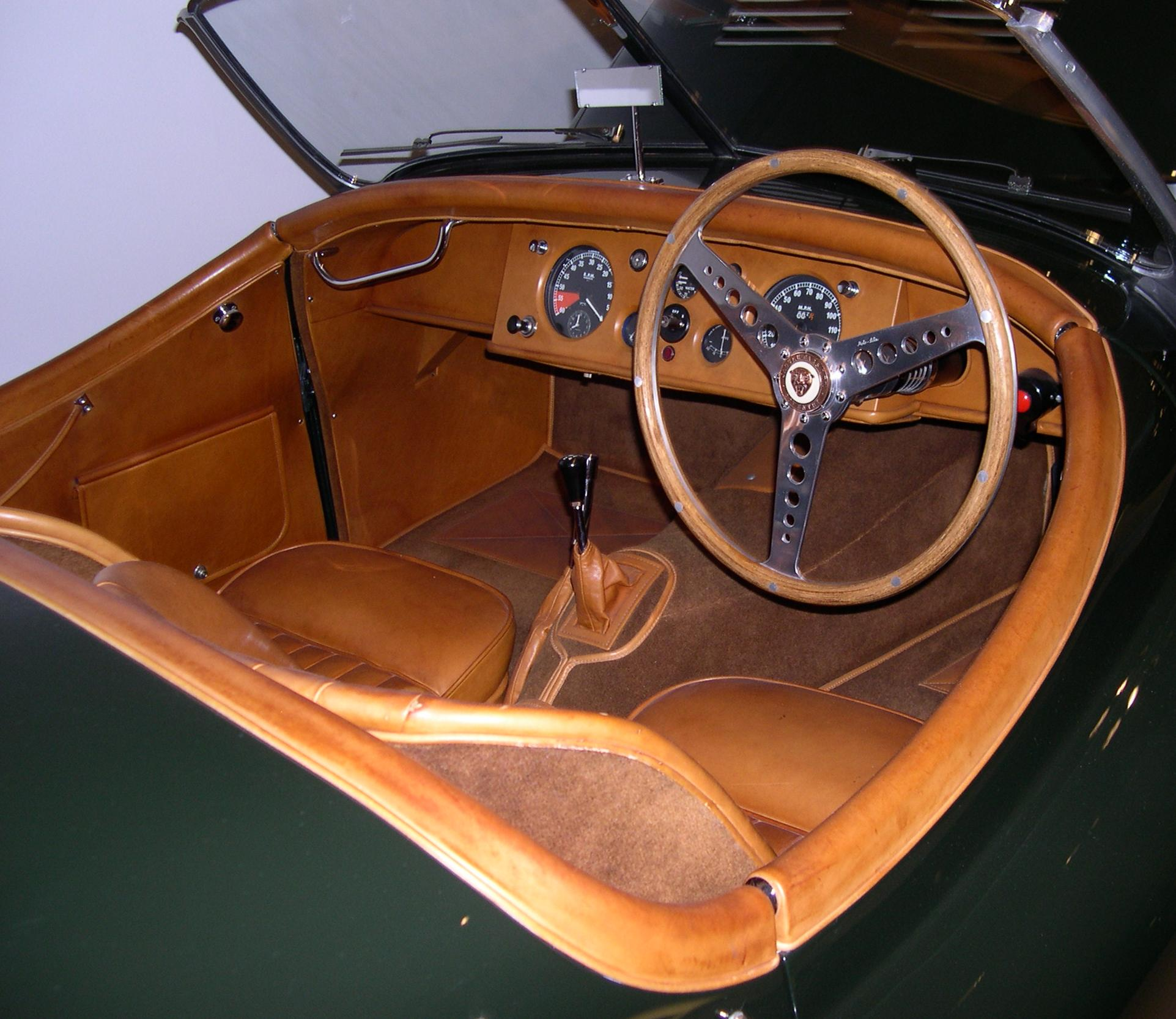
A 1950 aluminium-bodied XK120 that was formerly owned by Clemente Biondetti. It is equipped with competition seats and a Moto-Lita aftermarket steering wheel; positions of tachometer and speedometer have been reversed

The first 242 production XK120s, hand-built with aluminium bodies on ash framing, were constructed between late 1948 and early 1950. To meet demand, and beginning with the 1950 model year, all subsequent XK120s were mass-produced with pressed-steel bodies. Aluminium doors, bonnet, and boot lid were retained. The DHC and FHC versions, more luxuriously appointed than the constantly exposed open cars, had wind-up windows and wood veneers on the dashboard and interior door caps.

The XK120’s steel chassis was mostly copied from the Jaguar Mark V, using many of the same parts.

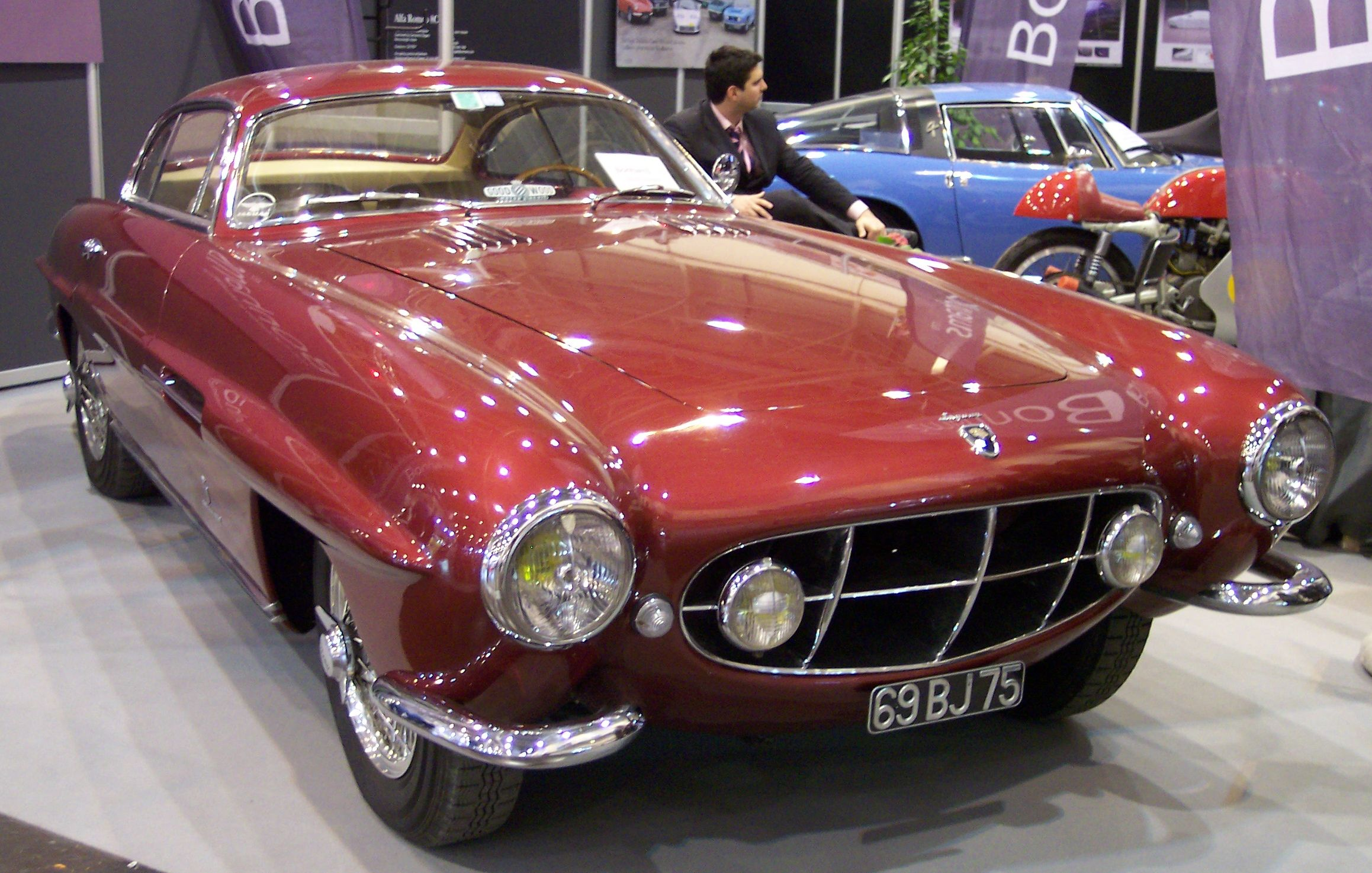
1954 Jaguar XK120 Supersonic by Ghia

The dual overhead-cam 3.4 L straight-6 XK engine was highly advanced for a mass-produced unit of the time, featuring a high-temperature, high-strength aluminum alloy cylinder head, hemispherical combustion chambers, inclined valves, and twin side-draft SU carburetors. Using 80 octane fuel a standard 8:1 compression ratio developed 160 bhp (119 kW). Most of the early cars were exported; a 7:1 low-compression version, with commensurately reduced performance, was reserved for the UK market, where the post-war austerity measures then in force restricted buyers to 70 octane "Pool petrol". The Jaguar factory's access to 80 octane fuel allowed it to provide cars with the higher compression ratio to the press, enabling journalists to test the model's optimum performance in Belgium, on a long, straight stretch of road between Jabbeke and Ostend. The XK engine's basic design by William Heynes, later modified into 3.8 and 4.2-litre versions, survived until 1992.

All XK120s had independent Heynes designed torsion bar front suspension, semi-elliptic leaf springs at the rear, recirculating ball steering, telescopically adjustable steering column, and all-round 12-inch drum brakes which were prone to fade. Some cars were fitted with Alfin (ALuminium FINned) brake drums to help overcome the fade.

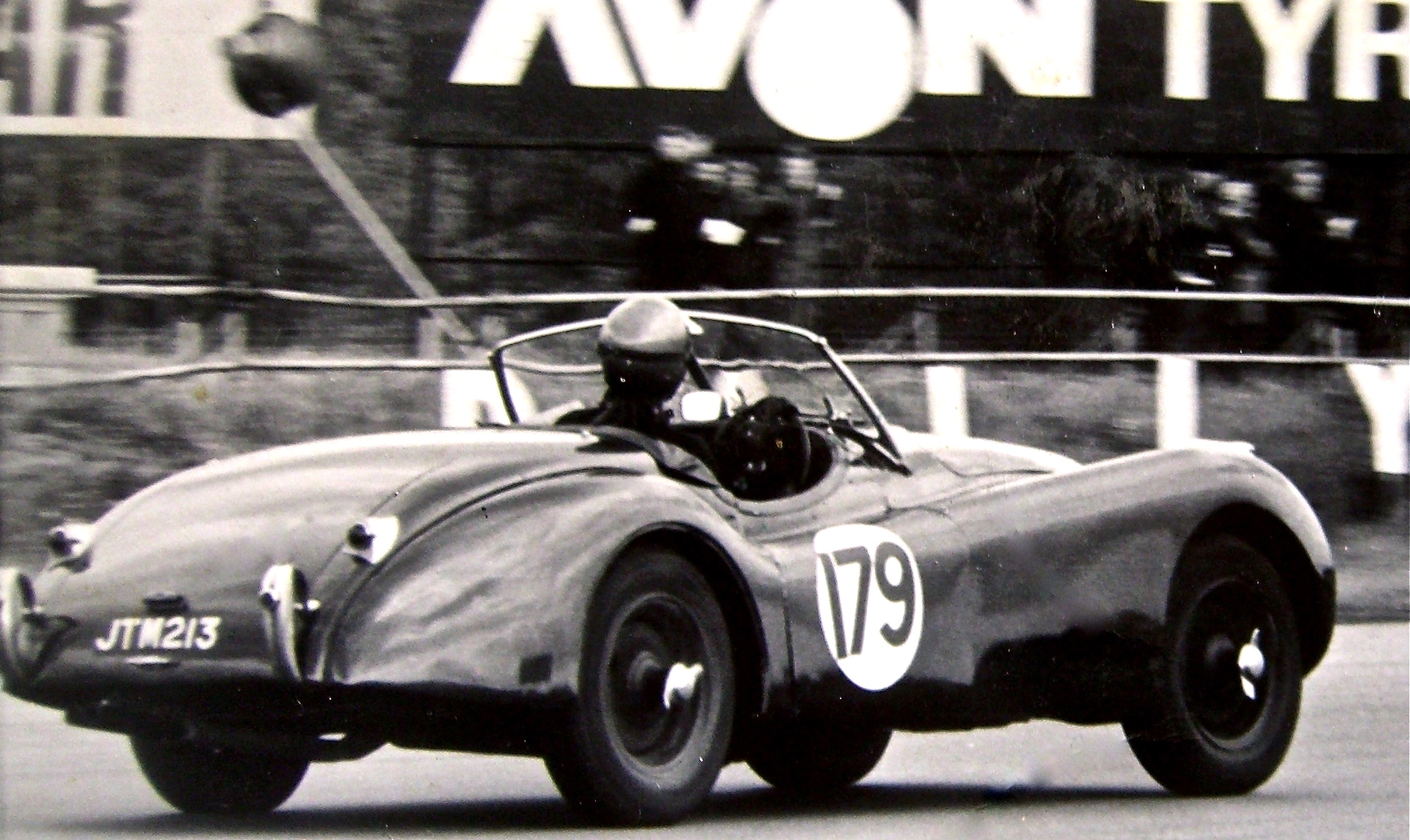
1951 XK120 racing at Silverstone has a single aero screen mounted behind the removable full-width windscreen

The open two-seater provided little weather protection. Its lightweight folding canvas top and detachable sidescreens stowed out of sight behind the seats. The doors had no external handles; they were opened by an interior pull-cord, accessed through a flap in the sidescreens when the weather equipment was in place. The windscreen could be removed for aeroscreens to be fitted.

The drophead coupé (DHC) had a padded, lined canvas top, which folded onto the rear deck behind the seats when retracted, and roll-up windows with opening quarter lights. The flat glass two-piece windscreen was set in a steel frame that was integrated with the body and painted the same colour.

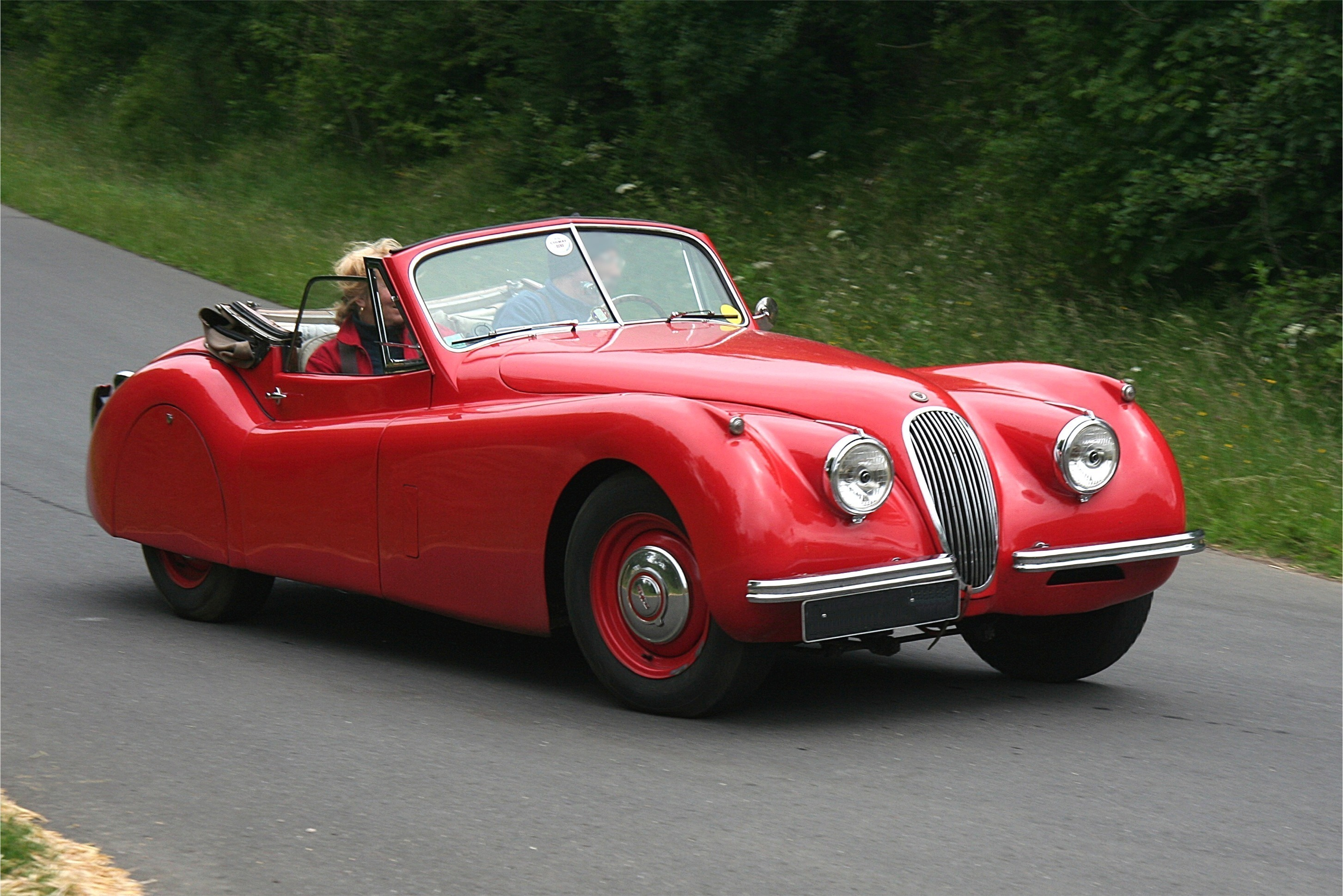
XK120 drophead coupé

Dashboards and door-caps in both the DHC and the closed coupé (FHC) were wood-veneered, whereas the open cars were leather-trimmed. All models had removable spats ("fender skirts" in America) covering the rear wheel arches, which enhanced the streamlined look. On cars fitted with optional centre-lock wire wheels (available from 1951), the spats were omitted as they gave insufficient clearance for the chromed, two-eared Rudge-Whitworth knockoff hubs. Chromium-plated wire wheels were optional from 1953. Factory standard 6.00 × 16-inch cross ply tyres were fitted on 16 × 5K solid wheels (Pre–1951), with 185VR16 Pirelli Cinturato radial tyres available as a later option.

In addition to wire wheels, upgrades on the Special Equipment (SE) version (called the M version for Modified in the United States) included increased power, stiffer suspension and dual exhaust system.

== Engine specifications ==
XK 120 ENGINES
Model	Years	Displacement	Configuration	Bore x stroke	Carburettor	Power
XK 120 3.4	1948–1954	3,441 cc (3.4 L; 210.0 cu in)	DOHC Straight-6	83 mm × 106 mm (3.27 in × 4.17 in)	Double SU H6	160 bhp (119 kW; 162 PS) @ 5000 rpm
XK 120 3.4 SE for Special Equipment (unofficially called the "M" for Modified in the USA) higher lift camshafts and twin exhaust pipes	offered as a factory option beginning mid-1951 per Service Bulletin #95 dated June 1951	3,441 cc (3.4 L; 210.0 cu in)	DOHC Straight-6	83 mm × 106 mm (3.27 in × 4.17 in)	Double SU H6	180 bhp (134 kW; 182 PS) @ 5300 rpm
XK 120 3.4 modified by agent/dealer or owner (C-Type Head and larger SU carbs)	racing parts made available through agents/dealers beginning in 1953 per Service Bulletin #95A dated April 1953	3,441 cc (3.4 L; 210.0 cu in)	DOHC Straight-6	83 mm × 106 mm (3.27 in × 4.17 in)	Double SU H8	210 bhp (157 kW; 213 PS) @ 5750 rpm
XK 120 3.4 modified by agent/dealer or owner for racing (C-Type Head and Weber carbs)	racing carbs and manifold not supplied by the factory	3,441 cc (3.4 L; 210.0 cu in)	DOHC Straight-6	83 mm × 106 mm (3.27 in × 4.17 in)	Double DCO3 40mm Weber	220 bhp (164 kW; 223 PS)

== Performance ==
The Motor magazine road-tested an XK120 in November 1949. This pre-production car, chassis number 660001, road-registered as HKV 455, was the first prototype built. It was also the 1948 London Motor Show display model, and had been driven by Prince Bira in the 1949 Silverstone Production Car Race. When tested, it had the 8:1 compression ratio, was fitted with an aerodynamic undertray, and ran with hood and sidescreens in place. The magazine reported a top speed of 124.6 mph (200.5 km/h), acceleration from 0–60 mph (97 km/h) in 10.0 seconds and fuel consumption of 19.8 miles per imperial gallon (14.3 L/100 km; 16.5 mpg_{‑US}). The car as tested cost £1263 including taxes.

The XK120 M for US market accelerated from 0–60 mph (97 km/h) in 8.7 seconds, top speed was 132 mph (212 km/h) by the speedometer, but actual top speed was about 120 mph (193 km/h).

== Racing and rallying ==
XK120s were active in racing and rallying:

=== 1949 ===
- First race victory: In the Daily Express-sponsored One-Hour Production Car Race held on 30 August 1949 at Silverstone Circuit, England, Leslie Johnson drove the Jabbeke car to the XK120's first-ever race victory (despite an early collision with a spinning Jowett Javelin which dropped the Jaguar to fifth). The car, road-registered HKV 500, was converted to right-hand drive for Silverstone. Two other XK120s took part. One, driven by Peter Walker, finished second and the other, driven by Prince Bira, spun out of contention when a tyre punctured.

=== 1950 ===
- First victory in America: In January 1950 Johnson also scored the model's first competition success in America, winning the production class in a race at Palm Beach Shores, Florida with the car that had finished second at Silverstone. The Jaguar lost its brakes but finished fourth overall. John Lea, Jaguar's Experimental Department mechanic who attended the race, reported: "The conditions at Palm Beach were wet, windy and sandy. Water and sand gained entry into the brake drums at the front, and the mixture had the effect of accelerating the wear very considerably. Our car finished with no linings and with the steel shoes bearing on the brake drums."
- Pebble Beach Cup: In May, XK120s driven by Phil Hill and Don Parkinson finished first and second in this event at the inaugural Pebble Beach Road Races in 1950.

In 1950 Jaguar allocated six alloy-bodied XK120s to drivers Leslie Johnson, Peter Walker, Nick Haines, Clemente Biondetti, Ian Appleyard and Tommy Wisdom.

- Le Mans: Three of the allocated cars, mildly modified, entered the 1950 Le Mans 24 Hours race. Johnson, who spearheaded this factory-supported assault on the race with co-driver Bert Hadley, never ran lower than seventh place, and held second for two hours, but in the 21st hour had to retire from third place with clutch failure caused by using the gears to slow the car in the absence of brakes. (As a result, the clutch was revised to a more robust design for production models.) The Jaguar had been closing the gap to leader Louis Rosier, whose Talbot's pace was significantly slower, at a rate that would have secured victory. Haines, with co-driver Peter Clark, finished 12th, and Walker's car, driven by Peter Whitehead and John Marshall, was 15th. The results convinced William Lyons and Chief Engineer William Heynes that it was worth investing in future success at Le Mans.
- Targa Florio: Biondetti's car, the first XK120 to contest the Targa Florio, lay second to Alberto Ascari's Ferrari when a connecting rod broke, ending the Jaguar's run.
- Mille Miglia: Johnson took fifth place in the Mille Miglia, with John Lea as his riding mechanic, while Biondetti and co-driver Gino Bronzoni finished eighth. Fifth was an outstanding achievement for a production car, with Johnson's Jaguar beaten only by Fangio's works Alfa Romeo and the works Ferraris of Serafini, Bracco and winner Marzotto. It was Jaguar's best-ever finish in the Mille Miglia; also the best by a British car and driver combination, a feat that only Reg Parnell ever equalled, driving an Aston Martin DB3 in 1953.
- Silverstone Production Car Race: Five XK120s entered the race, which Peter Walker won from Tony Rolt, with Johnson recovering to eighth after spinning on oil. Jaguar won the team prize.
- Tourist Trophy: XK120s also achieved a 1–2–3 victory in the TT, held at Dundrod in heavy rain. On the eve of his 21st birthday Stirling Moss drove Tom Wisdom's car to a brilliant win ahead of Whitehead and Johnson, and Jaguar once again took the team prize.

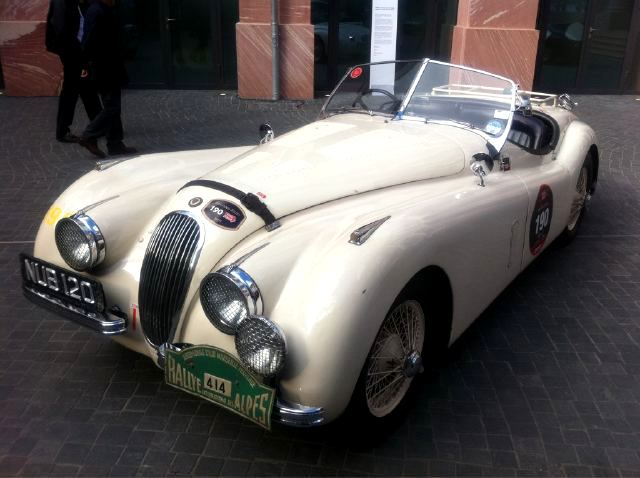
This 1950 XK120 won a Coupe des Alpes and a Coupe d'Or

- Alpine Rally: Ian Appleyard's XK120, road-registered as NUB 120, won the Alpine Rally with his wife Pat, who was the daughter of Sir William Lyons, navigating. They also won a coveted Coupe des Alpes.

=== 1951 ===
- Alpine Rally: NUB 120 and the Appleyards repeated their previous year's success.
- Tulip Rally: The Appleyards took first place in the Tulip Rally, with Swiss fighter pilot Rolf Habisreutinger's XK120 finishing second.

=== 1952 ===
- Alpine Rally: Although the Appleyards' XK120 did not win its third Alpine, it completed the rally without incurring a single penalty point, winning the first-ever Coupe d'Or (Gold Cup).

=== 1954 ===
- Mount Druitt 24 Hours Road Race: On 1 February 1954, an XK120 FHC driven by Geordie Anderson, Chas Swinburne and Bill Pitt won Australia's first 24-hour motor race, the 1954 Mount Druitt 24 Hours Road Race from a Bristol 400 and a Humber Super Snipe.
- NASCAR road race: In America, an XK120 FHC was the first imported car to achieve victory in NASCAR, when Al Keller won the first Grand National road race, held at Linden Airport, New Jersey, on 13 June 1954. Foreign made cars were banned from this series after this race until Toyota entered the series in 2007.

== High-speed runs and records ==
=== 1949 ===
- 132.596 mph (213.393 km/h) through the flying mile: in May, Jaguar demonstrated an XK120 to the press on the high-speed autoroute between Jabbeke and Aalter in Belgium. The road was closed for the occasion. The white left-hand drive car, chassis number 670002, was the second XK120 built. Jaguar's development engineer Walter Hassan was to have driven but fell ill, so Jaguar test-driver Ron "Soapy" Sutton substituted. With hood and sidescreens erected, and the airflow under the car improved by the addition of a full-length aluminium undertray, the Jaguar was timed through the flying mile by the Royal Automobile Club of Belgium at 126.448 mph (203.498 km/h). With hood, sidescreens and windscreen removed, a metal airflow deflector fitted in front of the driver, and a tonneau cover fastened over the passenger side of the cockpit the speed improved to 132.596 mph (213.393 km/h). The Observer's Book of Automobiles said it was the fastest production car in the world. The Special Equipment 'S' series cars made in 1948-1949 had better compression ratios and were capable of top speeds of 128 mph.

=== 1950 ===
- 107.46 mph (172.94 km/h) for 24 hours (including stops for fuel and tyres): Leslie Johnson sharing his XK120 JWK 651 with Stirling Moss at the Autodrome de Montlhéry, a steeply banked oval track near Paris. The first time a production car had averaged over 100 mph (160.93 km/h) for 24 hours. Changing drivers every three hours, the Jaguar covered 2579.16 miles, with a best lap of 126.2 mph (203.10 km/h).

=== 1951 ===
- 131.83 mi (212.16 km) for one hour: Johnson solo in JWK 651 at Montlhéry. "No mean feat...driving at almost twice today's maximum (UK) speed limit into a steep turn, assaulted by the G-Force induced by 30 degree banking twice every minute, using Forties technology, leaf spring" (rear) "suspension and narrow cross ply tyres...Johnson remarked that the car felt so good it could have gone on for another week, an off-the-cuff comment that sowed the seed for another idea. Flat out for a week..."

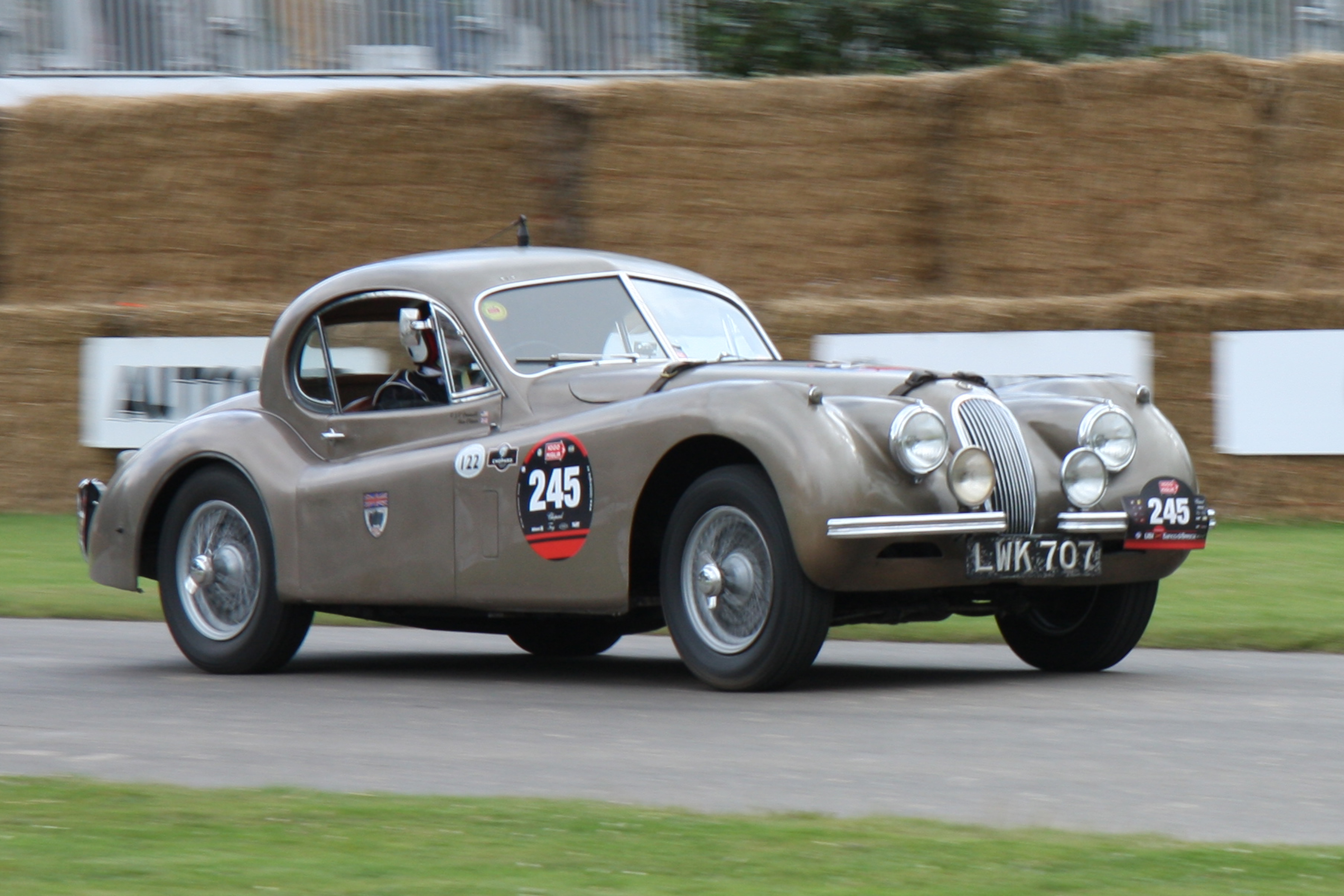
This 1952 XK120 fixed-head coupė averaged 100 mph for a week

=== 1952 ===
- 100.31 mph (161.43 km/h) for 7 days and 7 nights, again at Montlhéry: XK120 fixed-head coupé driven by Johnson, Moss, Hadley and Jack Fairman. William Lyons, mindful of the considerable kudos and advertising mileage that had already accrued from Johnson's exploits, commandeered a brand new XK120 FHC for him: bronze-colored, and fitted with wire wheels, it was Jaguar chief engineer William Heynes personal car, the second right-hand drive coupé made. The car broke a spring on the track's rough concrete surface when already well into the run. No spare was carried, and regulations stipulated that a replacement from outside would make the car ineligible for any further records beyond those already achieved before the repair. Johnson drove nine hours to save the other drivers from added risk while the speed had to be maintained on the broken spring. When he finally stopped to have it replaced, the car had taken the world and Class C 72-hour records at 105.55 mph (169.87 km/h), world and Class C four-day records at 101.17 mph (162.82 km/h), Class C 10,000-kilometre record at 107.031 mph (172.250 km/h), world and Class C 15,000-kilometre records at 101.95 mph (164.07 km/h), and world and Class C 10,000-mile (16,000 km) records at 100.65 mph (161.98 km/h). After the repair the car went on to complete the full seven days and nights, covering a total of 16,851.73 mi (27,120.23 km) at an average speed of 100.31 mph (161.43 km/h).

=== 1953 ===
- 172.412 mph (277.470 km/h) through the flying mile, again at Jabbeke's closed-off highway. On 21 October 1953 Jaguar test driver Norman Dewis drove a modified XK120 to a two-way average flying mile 172.412 mph. The car had several aerodynamic modifications, including a distinctive bubble-shaped, air-tight canopy from a glider aircraft. After the record run the Jaguar XK120 was converted back to a road car and sold by the company. Today the car is back to Jabbeke configuration and part of an important classic car collection. Shown at events like Pebble Beach, Villa d'Este, and Salon Privé.
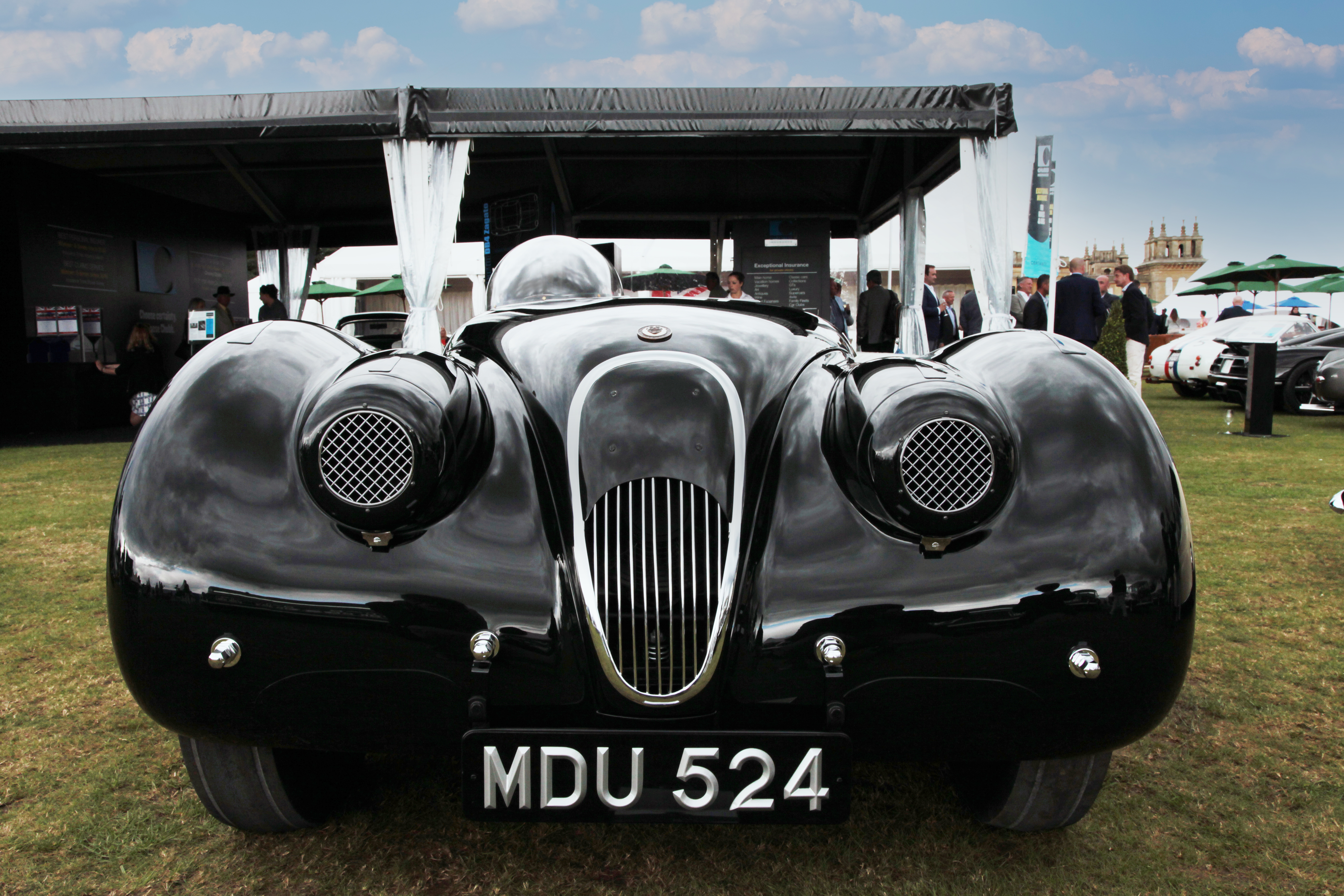
Jaguar XK120 XP/11 from the 1953 speed record

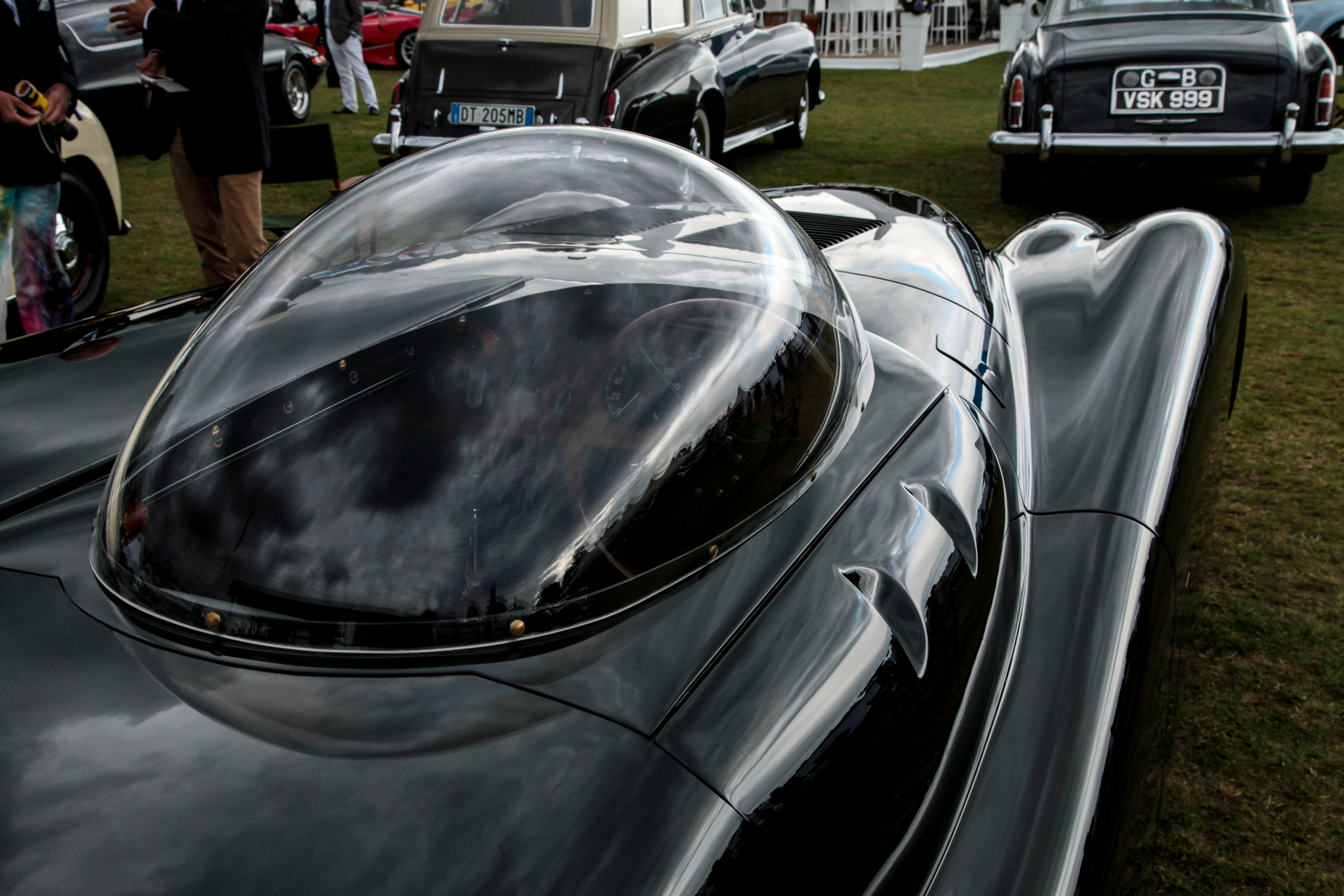
Cockpit

== Production ==
	Right-hand	Left-hand	Total
Open two-seater	1170	6436	7606
Fixed-head	195	2477	2672
Drop-head	295	1472	1767
Total	1660	10385	12045

== XK100 development ==
A 2-litre four-cylinder version of the twin cam XK engine was to have powered an XK100 variant of the XK120 for the UK market. Details of the model were included in an "Advance Particulars" brochure for the XK but Jaguar's managers were dissatisfied with the engine and the project was cancelled prior to production.
