= Holden Rodeo =

Pickup truck from Holden

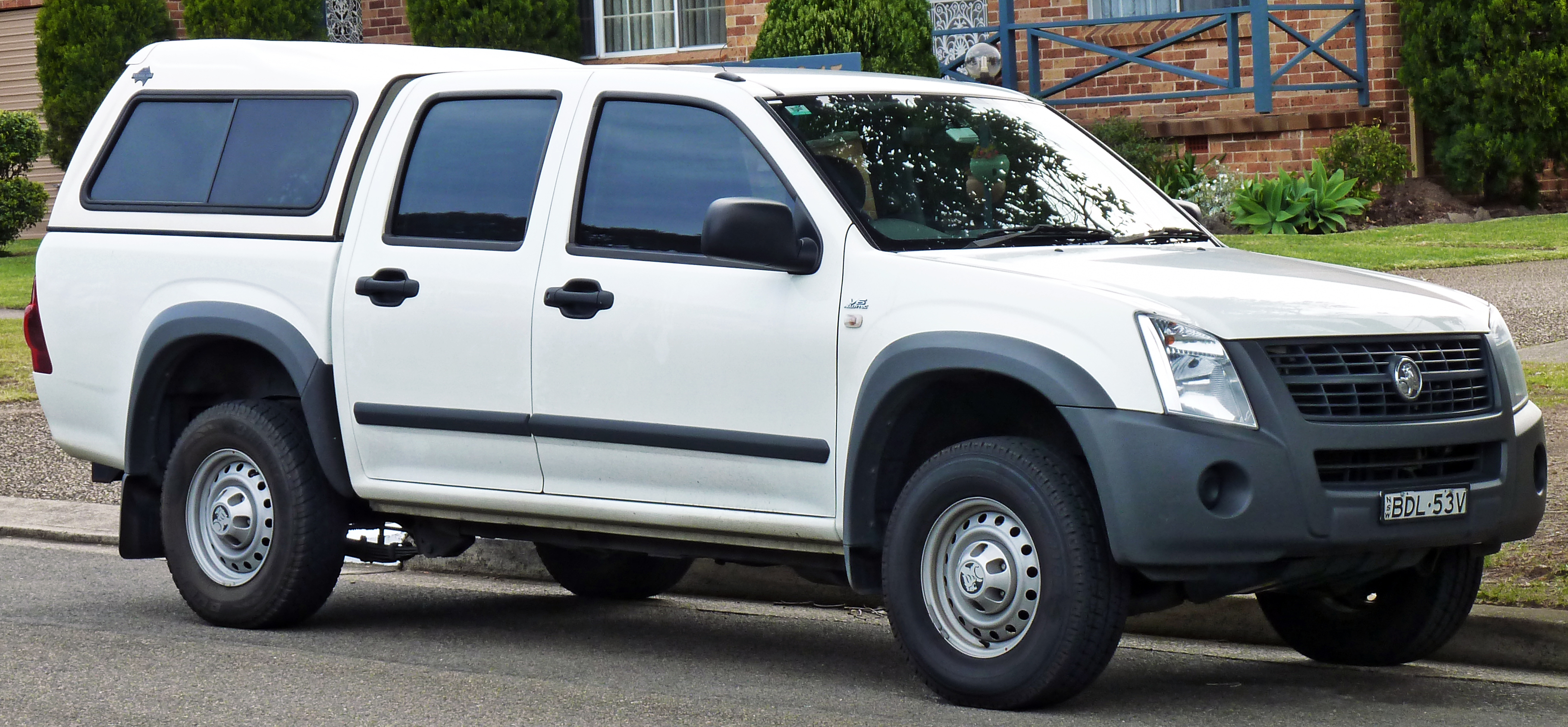

Overview
- Manufacturer: Holden
- Also called: Isuzu Faster; Isuzu D-Max
- Production: 1980–2008

Body and chassis
- Class: Compact pickup truck
- Body style: 2-door regular cab 2-door regular cab SWB; 2-door extended cab 4-door crew cab
- Layout: Front-engine, rear-wheel drive/four-wheel drive

Chronology
- Predecessor: Holden Utility
- Successor: Holden Colorado

The Holden Rodeo is a compact pickup truck sold by Holden from 1980 to 2008, built by Isuzu over three generations.

== History ==
Prior to the launch of the Holden Rodeo, Holden had imported the first generation Japanese market Isuzu Faster into Australasia under the names Chevrolet LUV (1972–1977) and Isuzu LUV (1977–1980). At the Australasian release of the second generation Faster in December 1980, Holden once again introduced a new name—Holden Rodeo—assigning it the model code KB and thus becoming the first generation Holden Rodeo.

With the demise of the Holden Utility with the end of the WB series in 1984, the Rodeo became the only ute offered by Holden for several years, until the arrival of the coupe utility Holden Utility (VG) in 1990.

Isuzu in Japan released the redesigned Faster in May 1988, adopted and issued by Holden in August 1988 as the second generation TF series Rodeo. The TF had several designations over its lifespan. The R7 was the first major facelift, introduced in 1997, featuring a completely new bonnet, front quarter panels, and grille. This was the last Rodeo to have chrome bumpers. The R9 arrived later in 1998, which replaced the chrome bumper with plastic bumpers on all models. A V6 engine became available for the first time, which proved very popular. An optional driver's airbag became available for the first time in 2000. In 2001, Rodeos received updated tail lights with clear indicators, replacing the previous orange-coloured ones. Larger composite headlights replaced the previous rectangular sealed beams. A final update in 2002 saw the circular Holden logo appear on the grille, replacing the "Holden" lettering. The 4JB1T turbo diesel engine proved popular in 4x4 models despite its rough idling characteristics. 4JB1T in the 4x4 models was fuel efficient even with 4.55:1 differential ratios giving higher engine RPM at highway speeds. By the end of its use in the R9 the 4JB1T reached Euro 2 emission standards. Later in the R9 lifespan the 4JH1 was available as an option with more power (96KW) and higher gearing before it became the only diesel available in the all new RA due to the 4JB1T's inability to meet emission standards.

Although Japanese sales of the Isuzu Faster ceased in October 1994, it remained in production until general exports began in June 2003 of its Thai-produced replacement, the Isuzu D-Max which launched in its home market of Thailand in May 2002. Australasian sales began in March 2003, earlier than other export markets, as the third generation RA series Holden Rodeo. At this point Holden retired the long-running TF model. Holden maintained sales of the RA generation until rebranding the Rodeo as Holden Colorado in July 2008. This was a result of Holden losing the rights to the Rodeo name following General Motors split with Isuzu.

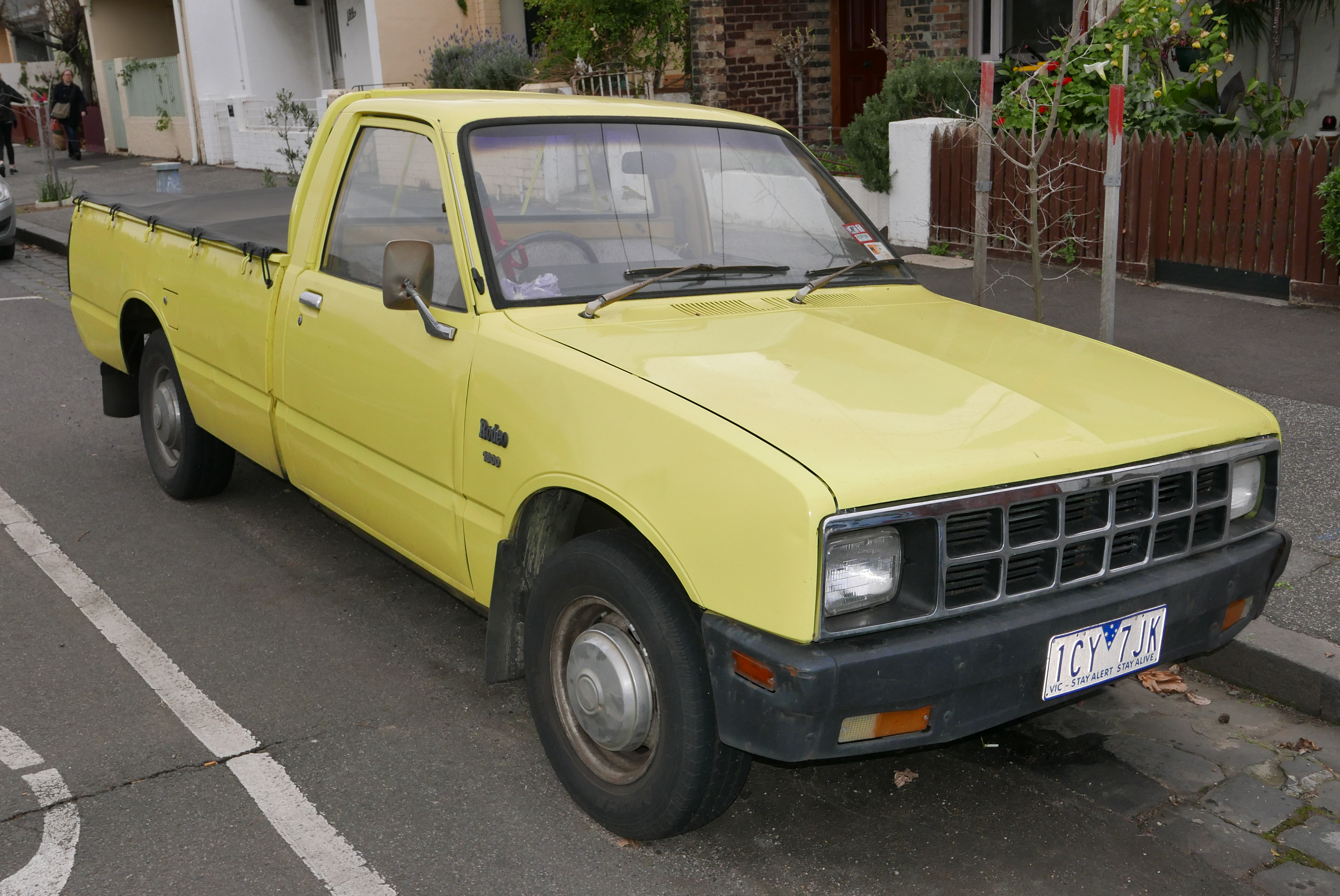
First generation (KB; 1980–1988)

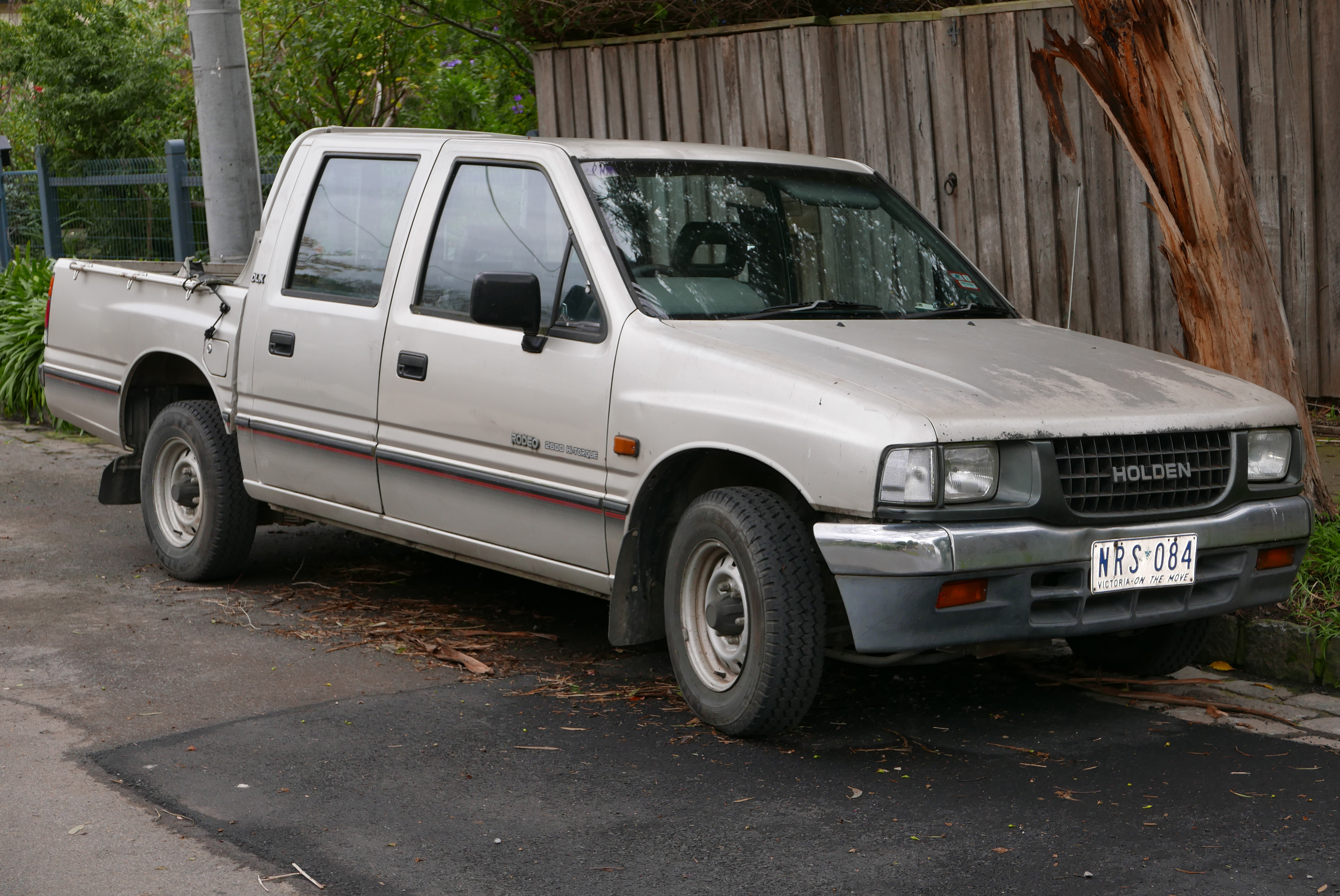
Second generation (TF; 1988–2003) R7 2wd version shown

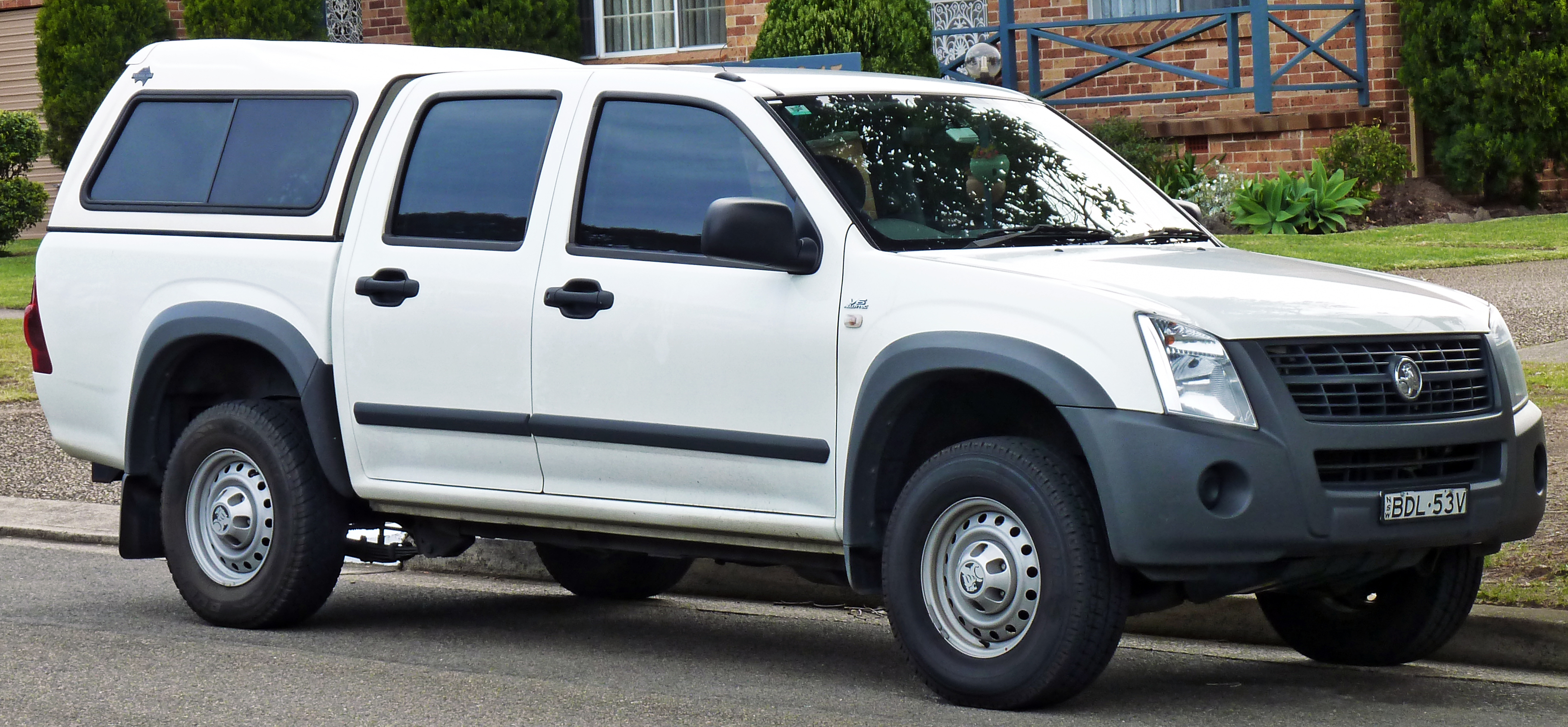
Third generation (RA; 2003–2008)

== Safety ==
ANCAP test results Holden Rodeo LX 4x2 cab chassis (2003)
Test	Score
Overall	3 /5 stars
Frontal offset	7.51/16
Side impact	16/16
Pole	Not Assessed
Seat belt reminders	0/3
Whiplash protection	Not Assessed
Pedestrian protection	Not Assessed
Electronic stability control	Not Available

ANCAP test results Holden Rodeo LX Crew Cab 4x4 (2003)
Test	Score
Overall	3 /5 stars
Frontal offset	5.40/16
Side impact	16/16
Pole	Not Assessed
Seat belt reminders	0/3
Whiplash protection	Not Assessed
Pedestrian protection	Poor
Electronic stability control	Not Available
