= Holden HZ =

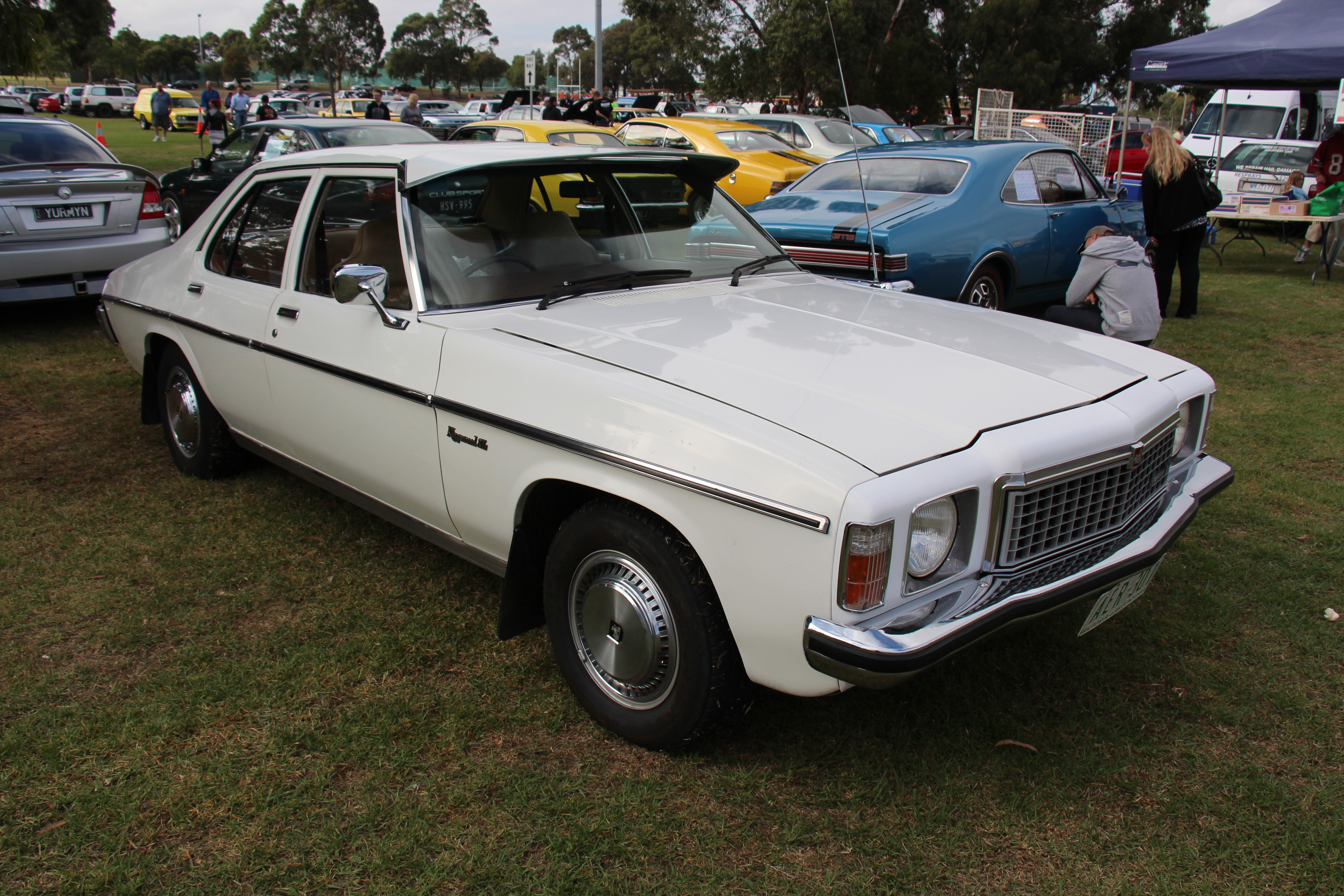
- Holden Kingswood SL sedan

Overview
- Manufacturer: Holden
- Production: October 1977 – April 1980
- Assembly: Australia: Acacia Ridge, Dandenong, Elizabeth, Pagewood; New Zealand: Trenham

Body and chassis
- Class: Full-size
- Body style: 4-door sedan; 5-door station wagon; 2-door ute; 2-door panel van; 2-door cab chassis
- Related: Statesman HZ

Powertrain
- Engine: 3.3 L 88 kW (118 hp) Red I6; 4.2 L 120 kW (161 hp) Red V8; 5.0 L 161 kW (216 hp) Red V8
- Transmission: 3-speed manual; 4-speed manual; 3-speed automatic; Tri-Matic; Turbo-Hydramatic 350 (4.2 L V8 only); Turbo-Hydramatic 400 (5.0 L V8 only)

Chronology
- Predecessor: Holden HX
- Successor: Holden WB (utility, cab chassis); Holden VB Commodore

Holden HZ is a full-sized automobile which was manufactured in Australia between October 1977 and April 1980 by Holden in a variety of equipment levels and in several different body styles. It was also assembled in New Zealand.

== Characteristics ==
The Holden HZ received minor updates to the exterior over the HX series, and saw the introduction of what Holden termed "Radial Tuned Suspension" (RTS) across all models. RTS made significant changes to the suspension of the car, greatly improving the handling finesse, while at the same time not compromising ride quality. Modern Motor magazine described the HZ as "a great handler spoiled by the car" in a comparison against the BMW 528i, contrasted as "a great car spoiled by the handling". In this series, the base specification Belmont was deleted and the new Kingswood SL became the base luxury level for sedans and wagons, with a lower specification Kingswood sedan and wagon only offered as a delete option on the Kingswood SL.

During the course of the HZ series, equipment levels were upgraded in 1978 effectively to match improvements in the opposition Ford Falcon XD range, but the life of the full W size Holden looked set to end following Holden's release of the Commodore VB in November 1978. After 1980 W sized Holden passenger cars were discontinued and replaced by the downsized Commodore. The Kingswood luxury level lived on until 1984 on the WB Holden utility but the end of HZ saw the end of the Holden Premier alongside both the GTS and Sandman which were both deleted prior to the end of the HZ series. Production of the HZ series totaled 154,155.

== Model range ==
The Holden HZ was offered in four sedan and three station wagon models, marketed as follows:

- Kingswood Sedan
- Kingswood Wagon
- Kingswood SL Sedan
- Kingswood SL Wagon
- Premier Sedan
- Premier Wagon
- GTS

It was also available in two ute, two panel van and one cab chassis model, marketed as follows:

- Utility
- Kingswood Utility
- Van
- Kingswood Van
- One Tonner (cab chassis)

There were two special vehicle packages also available based upon commercial vehicles:

- Sandman – option code XX7 (passenger tyres) or XU3 (load rated tyres).
- Ambulance – option code BO6, available on cab chassis and Holden panel van.
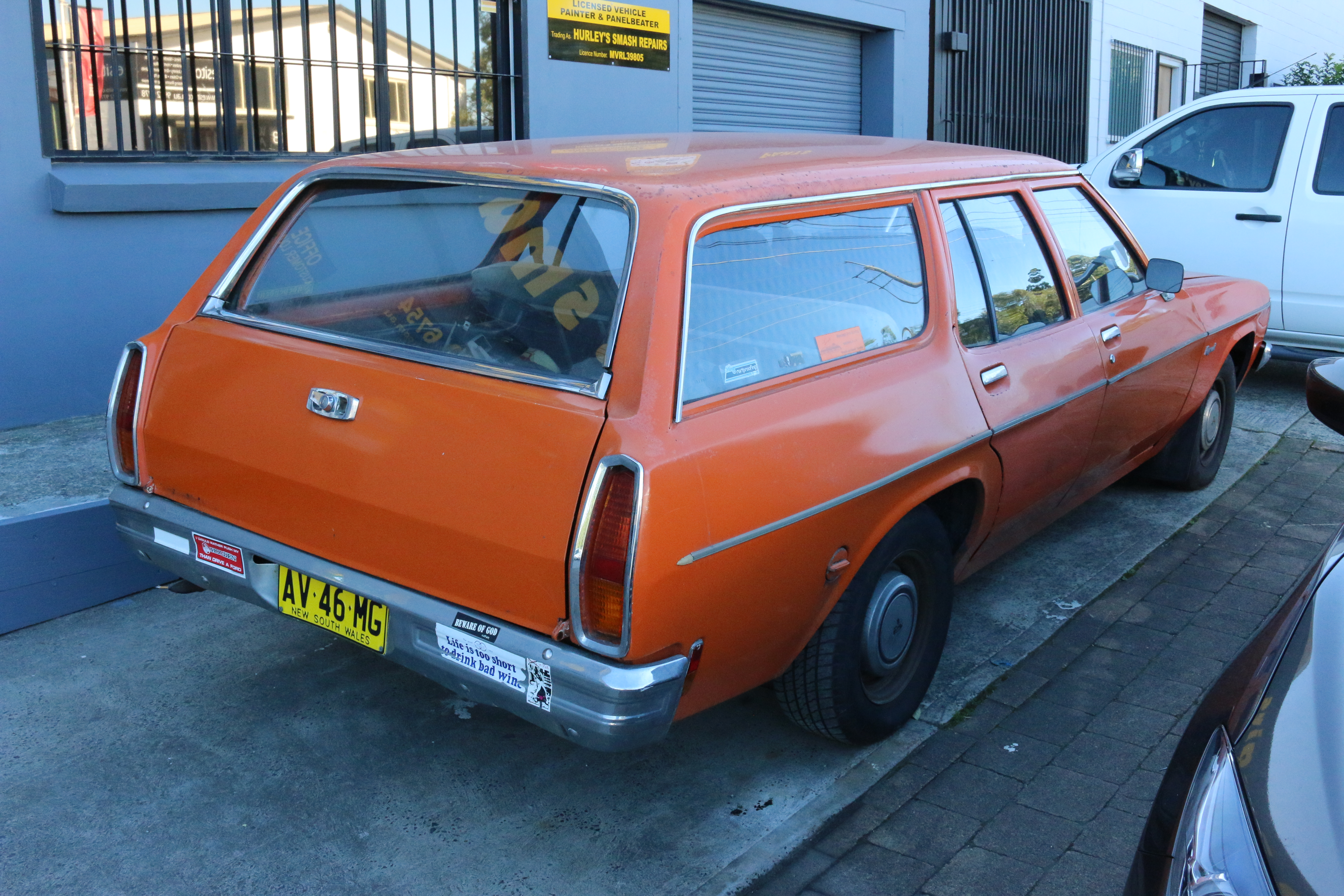
Holden Kingswood wagon

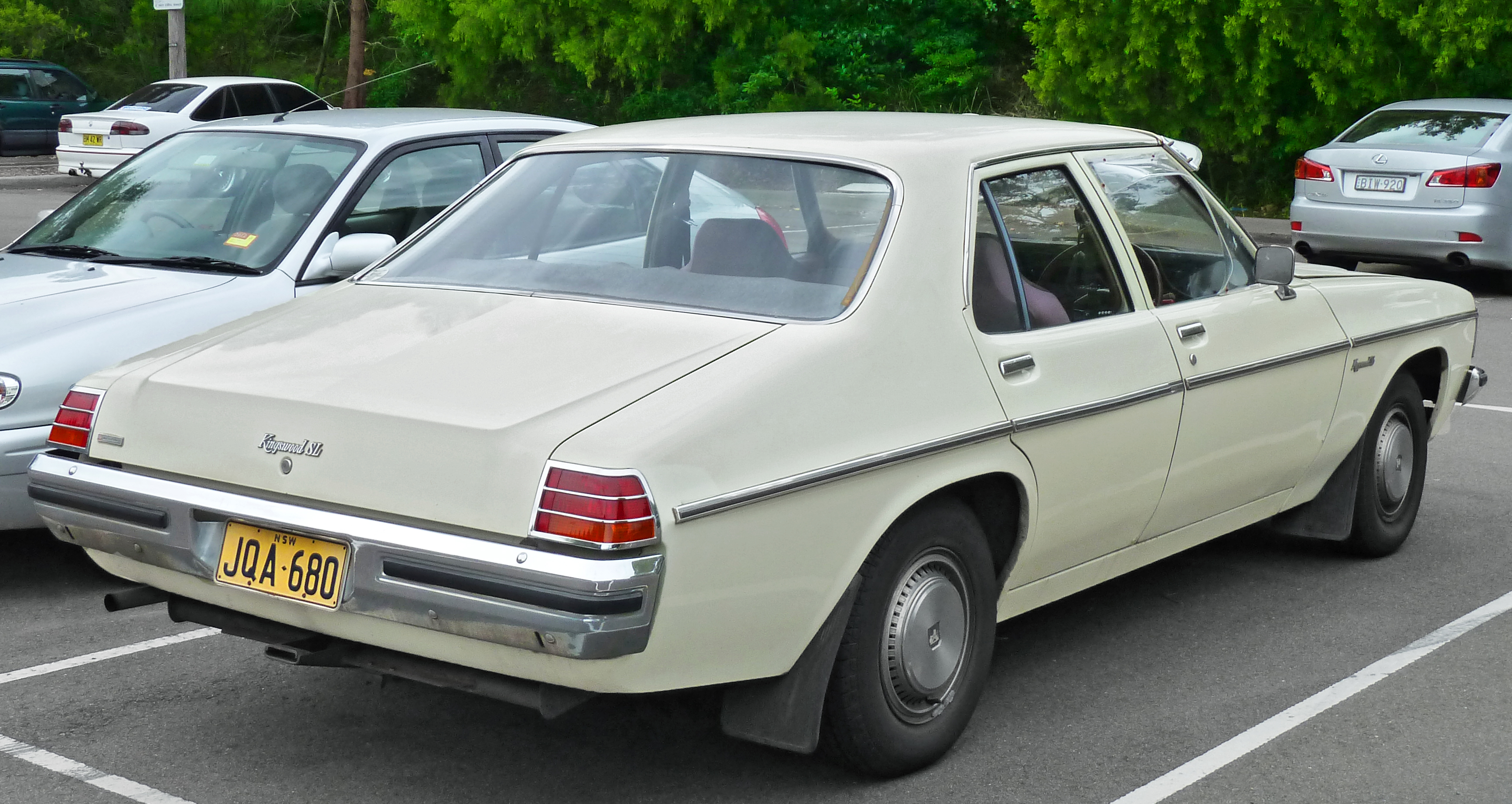
Holden Kingswood SL sedan

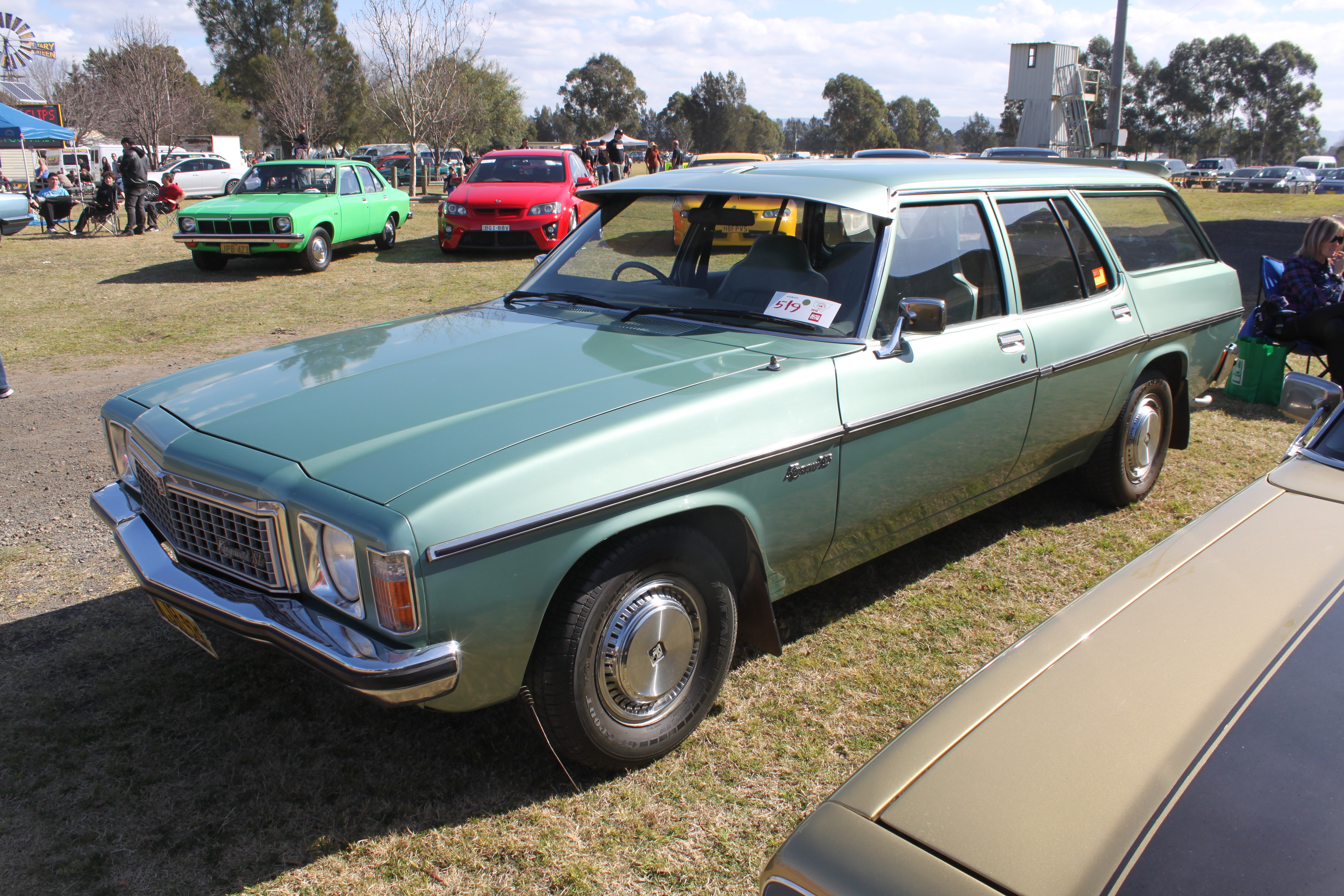
Holden Kingswood SL wagon

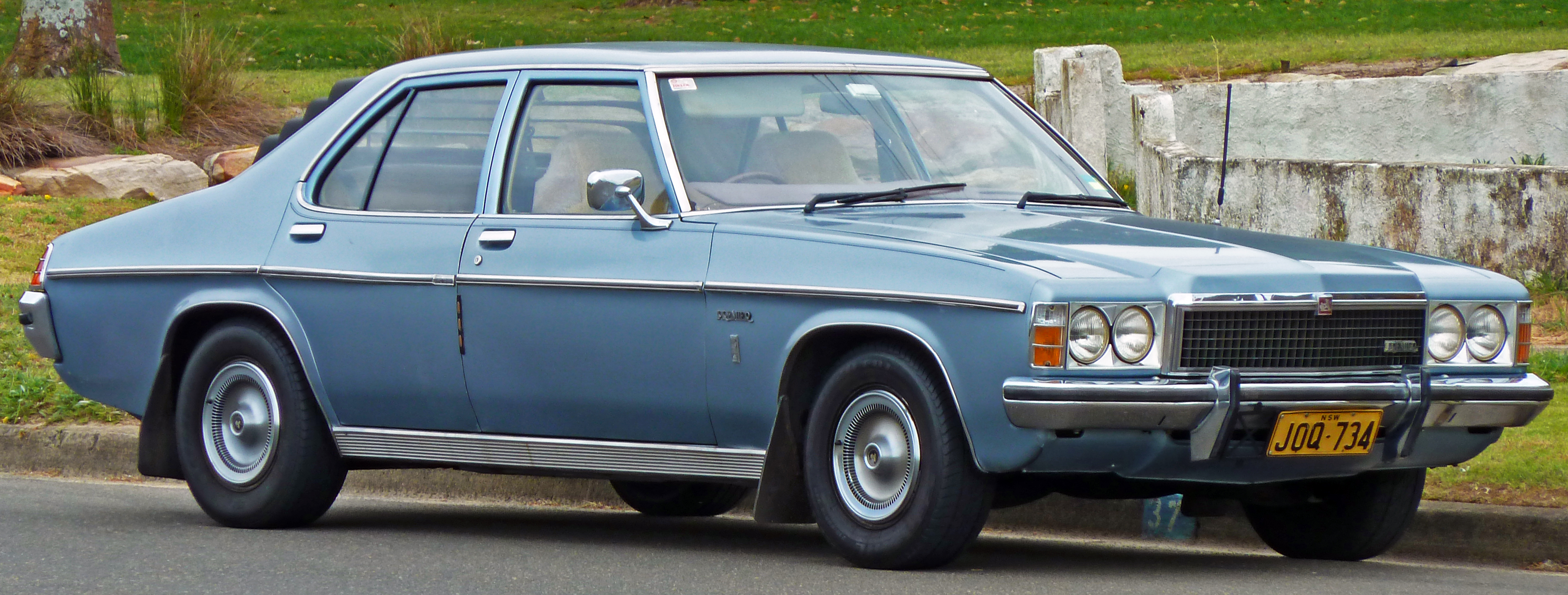
Holden Premier sedan

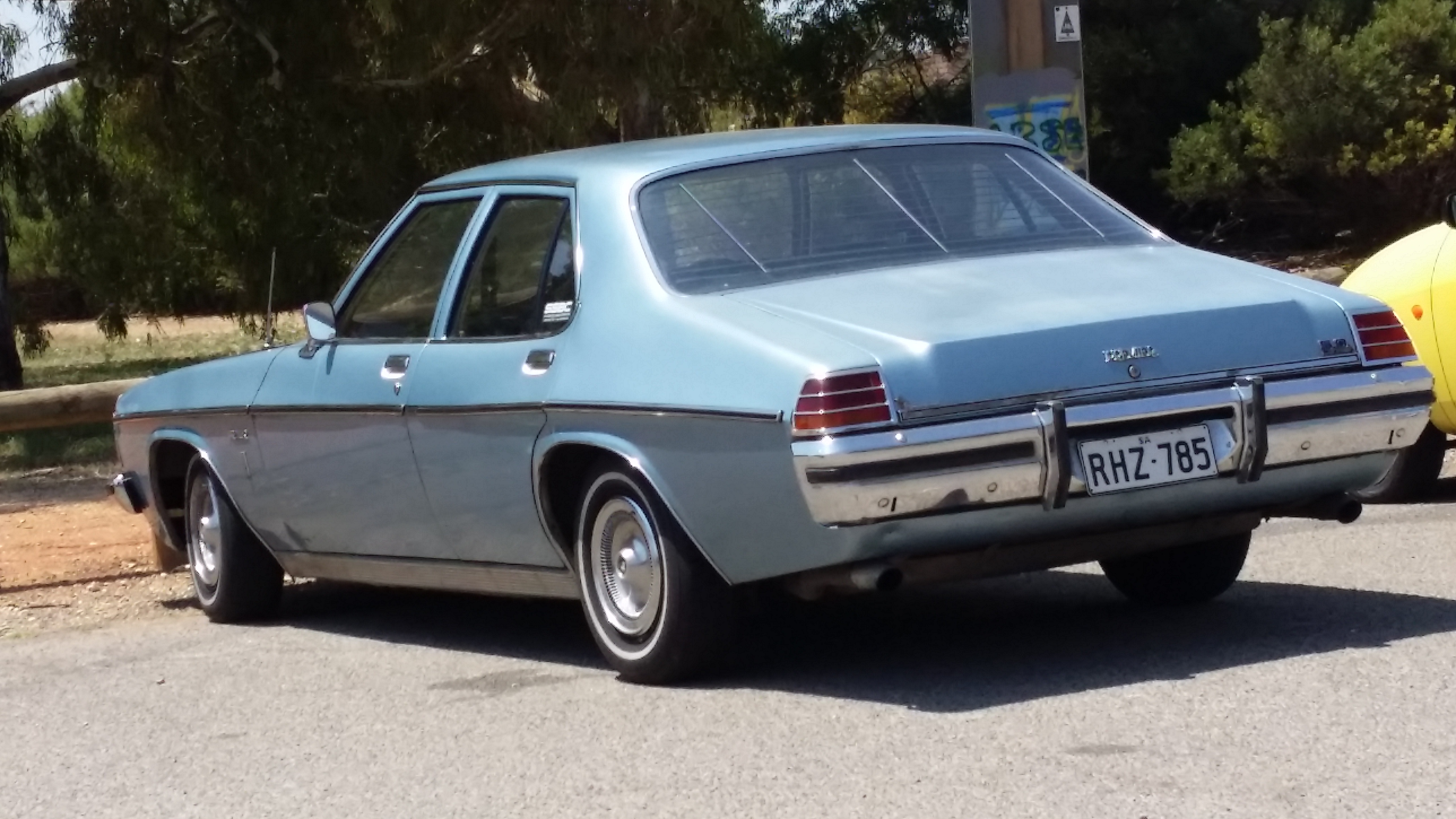
Holden Premier sedan

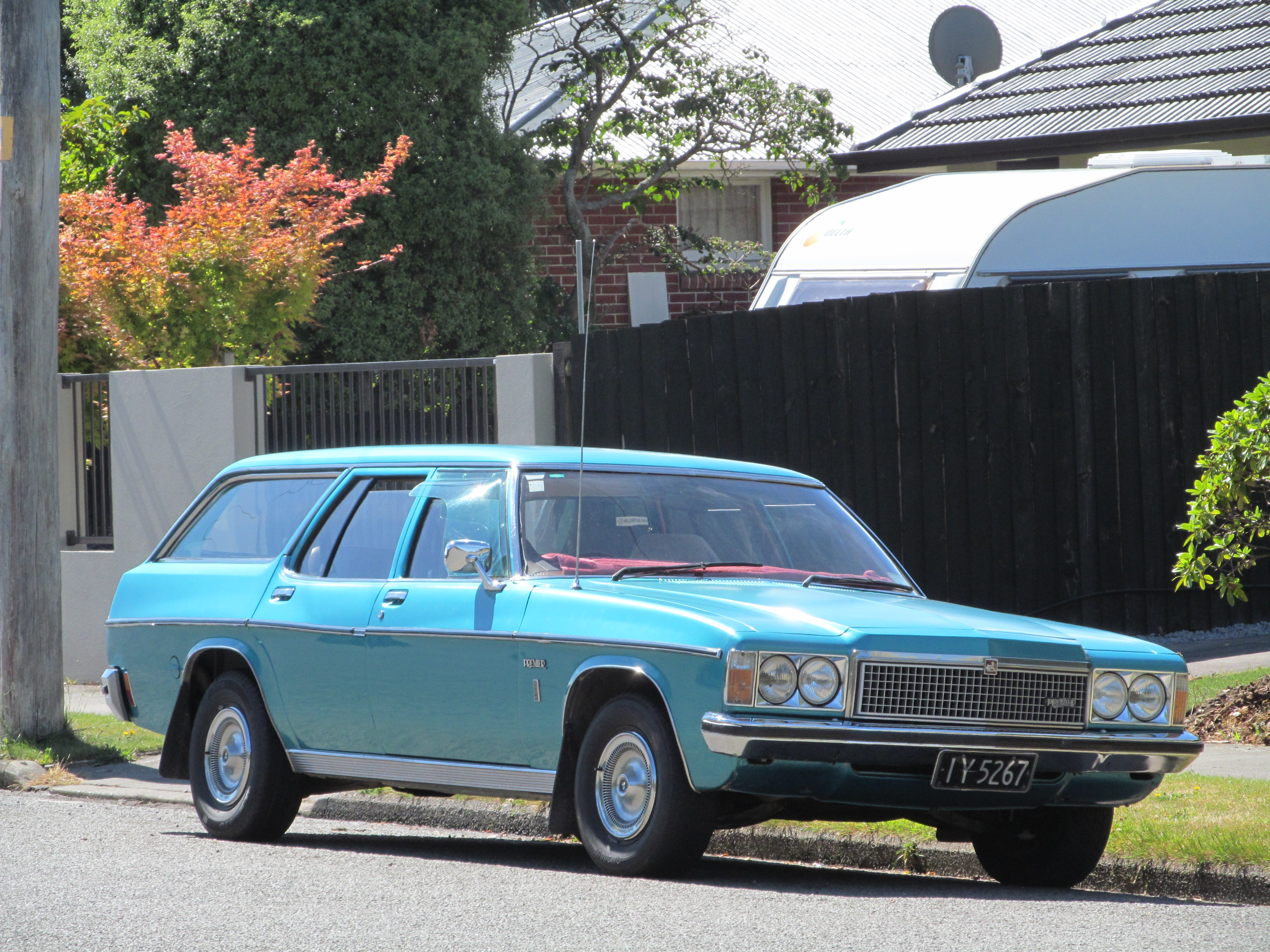
Holden Premier wagon

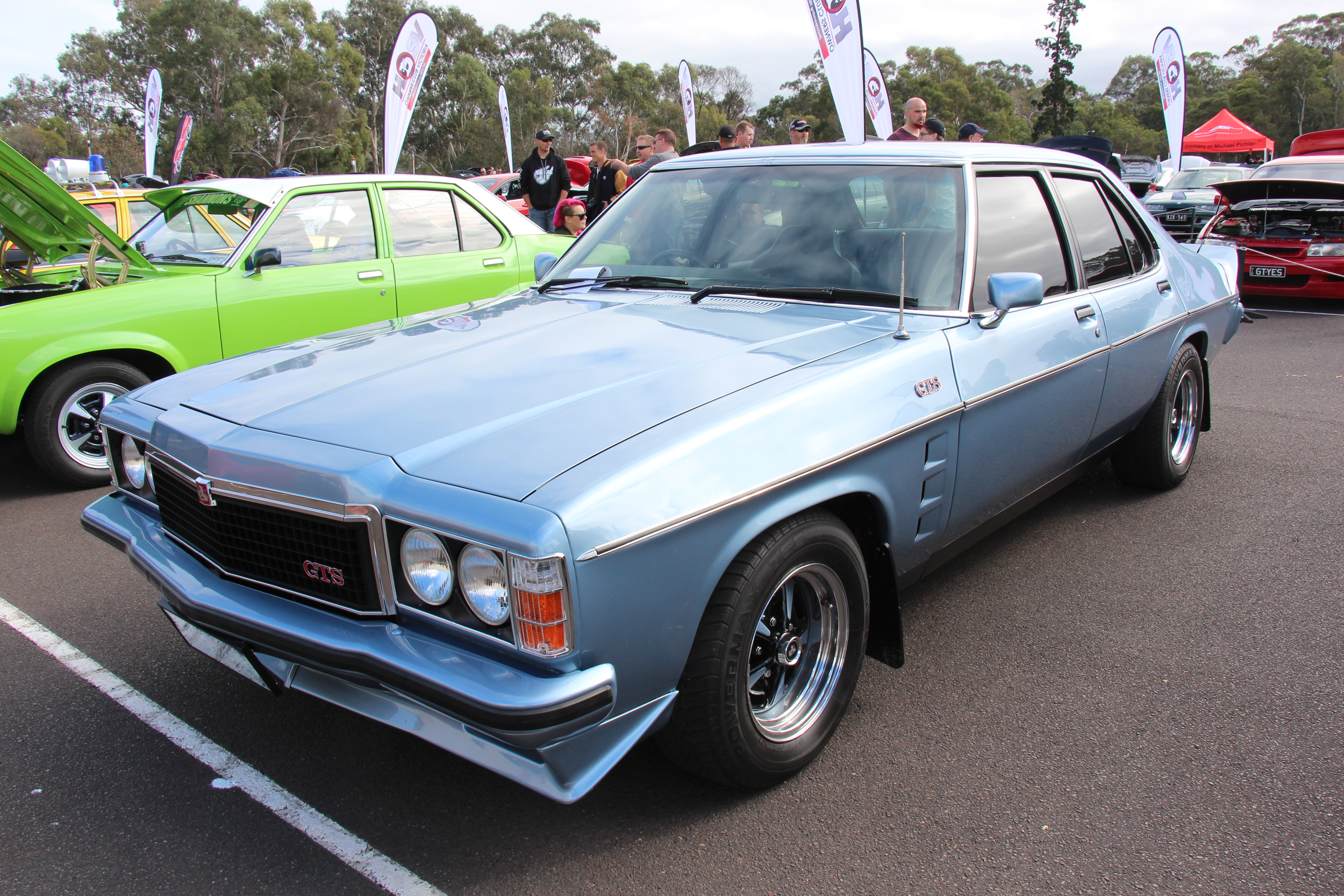
Holden GTS sedan

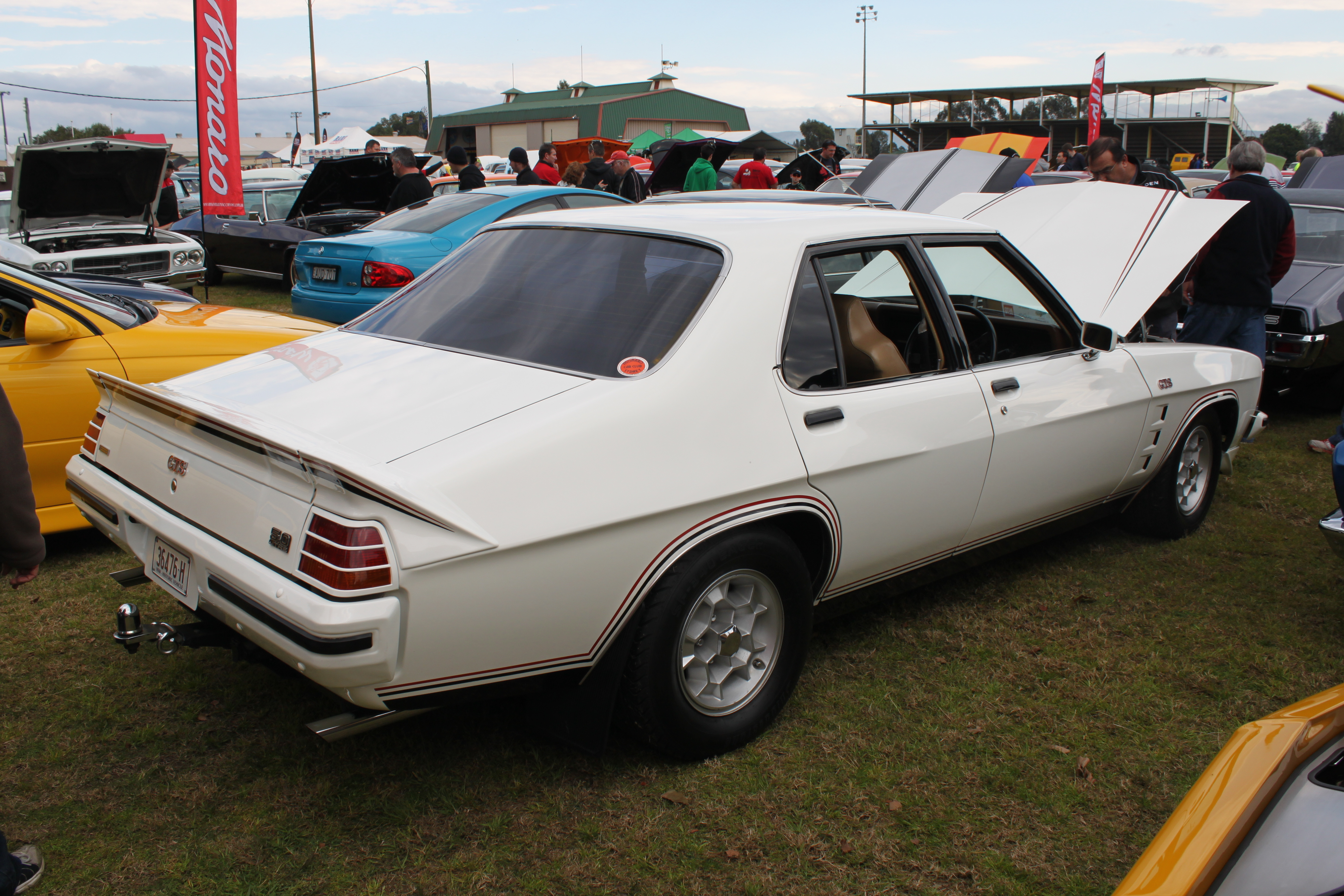
Holden GTS (with optional polycast sports wheels)

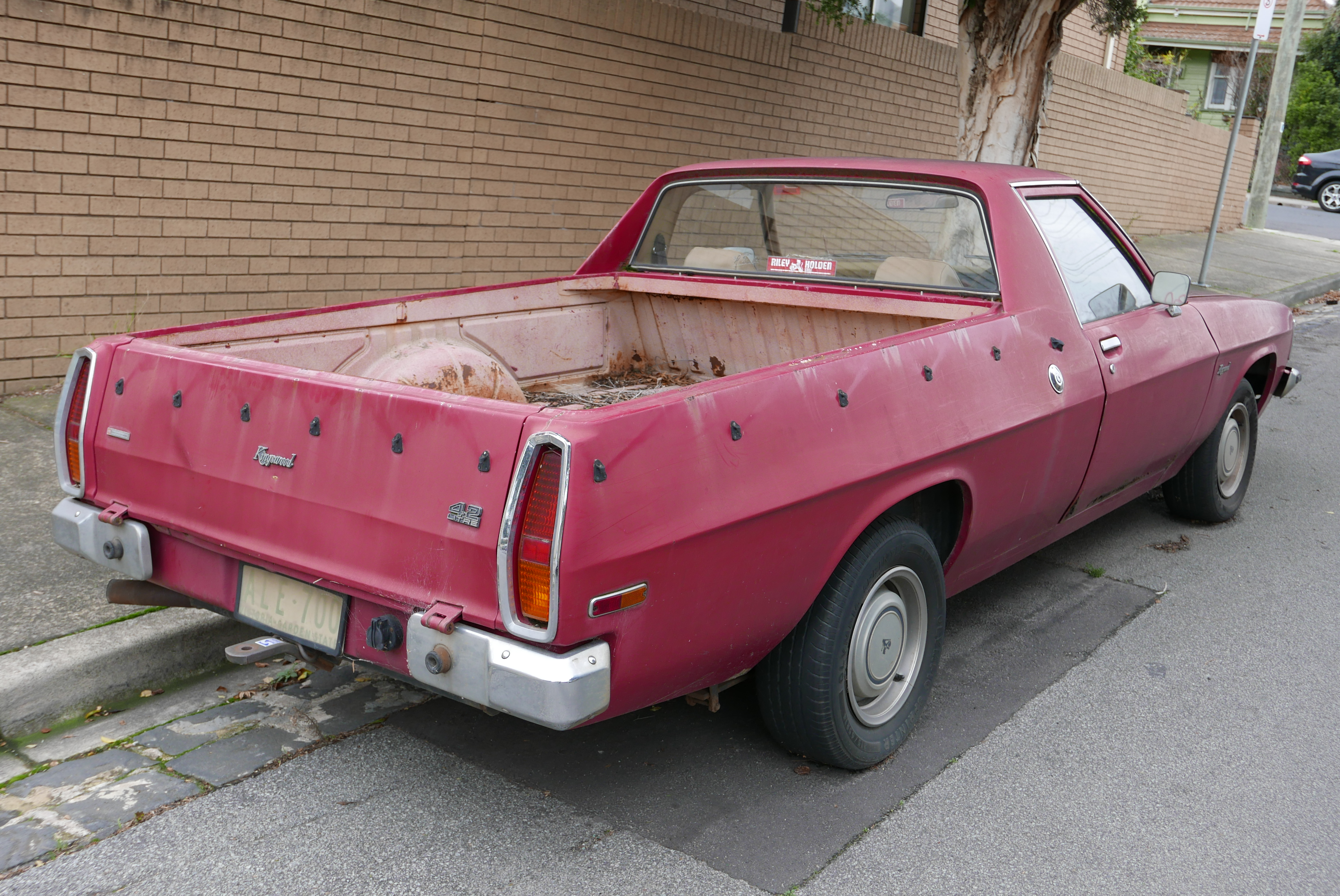
Holden Kingswood Ute

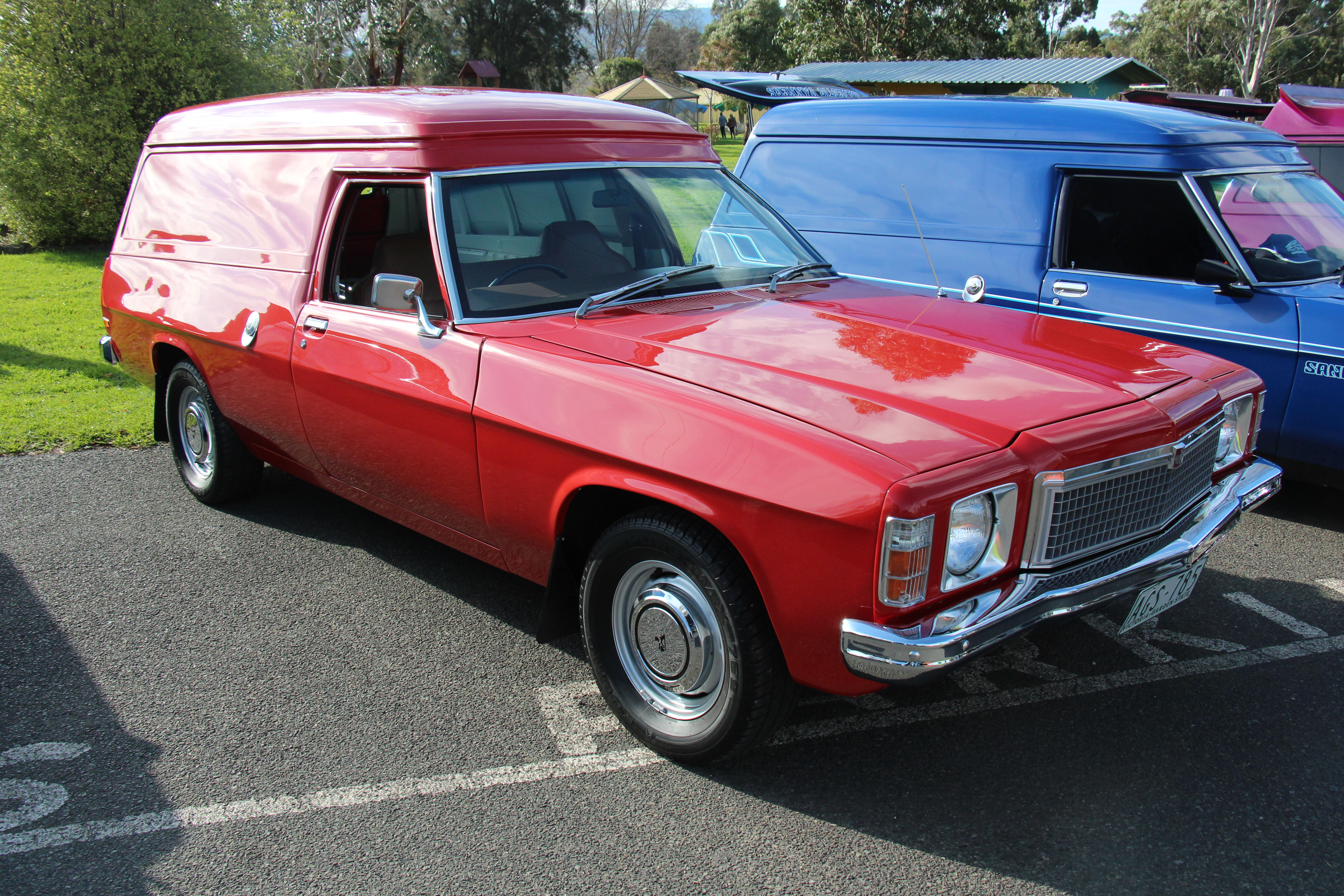
Holden Van

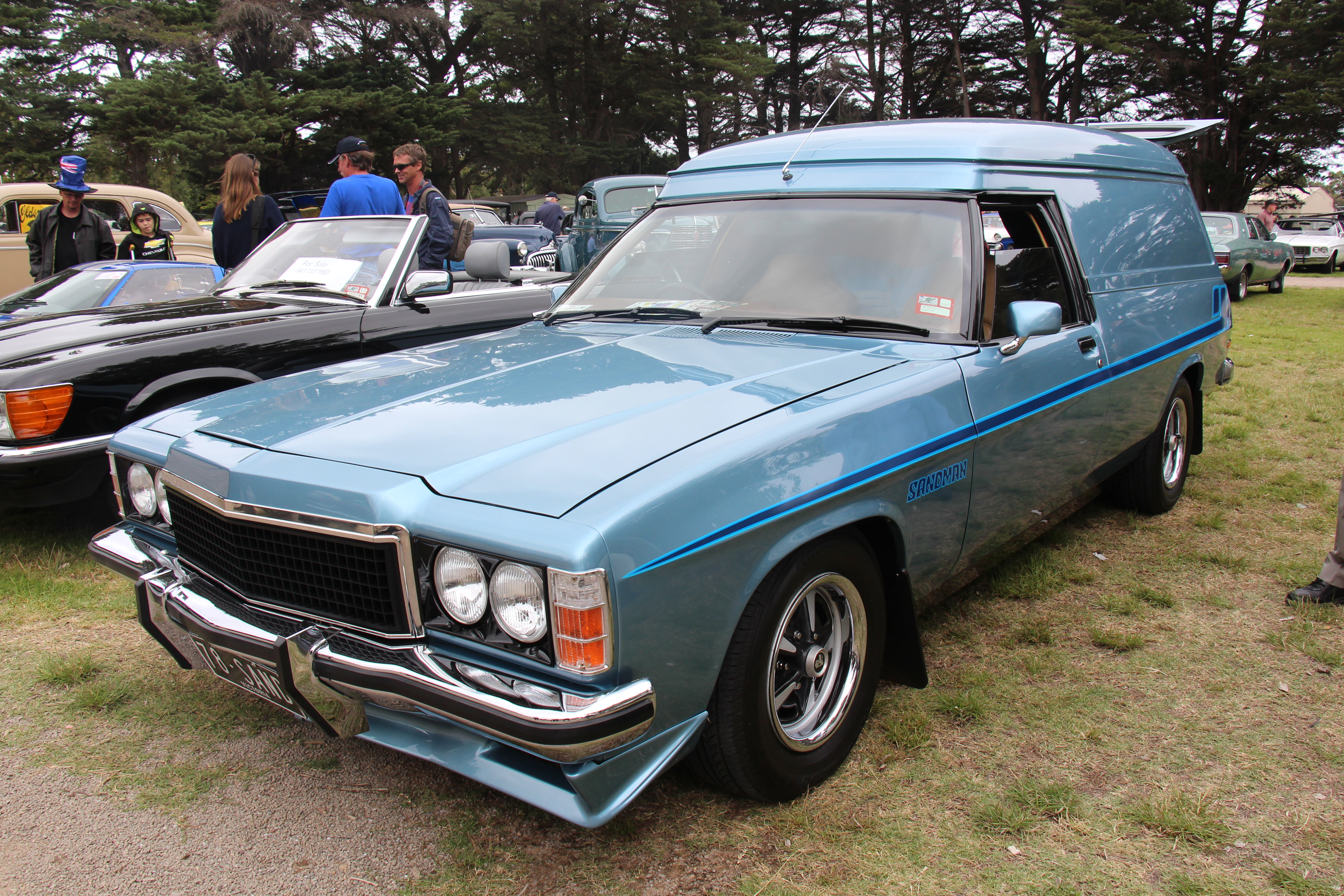
Holden Van with Sandman option

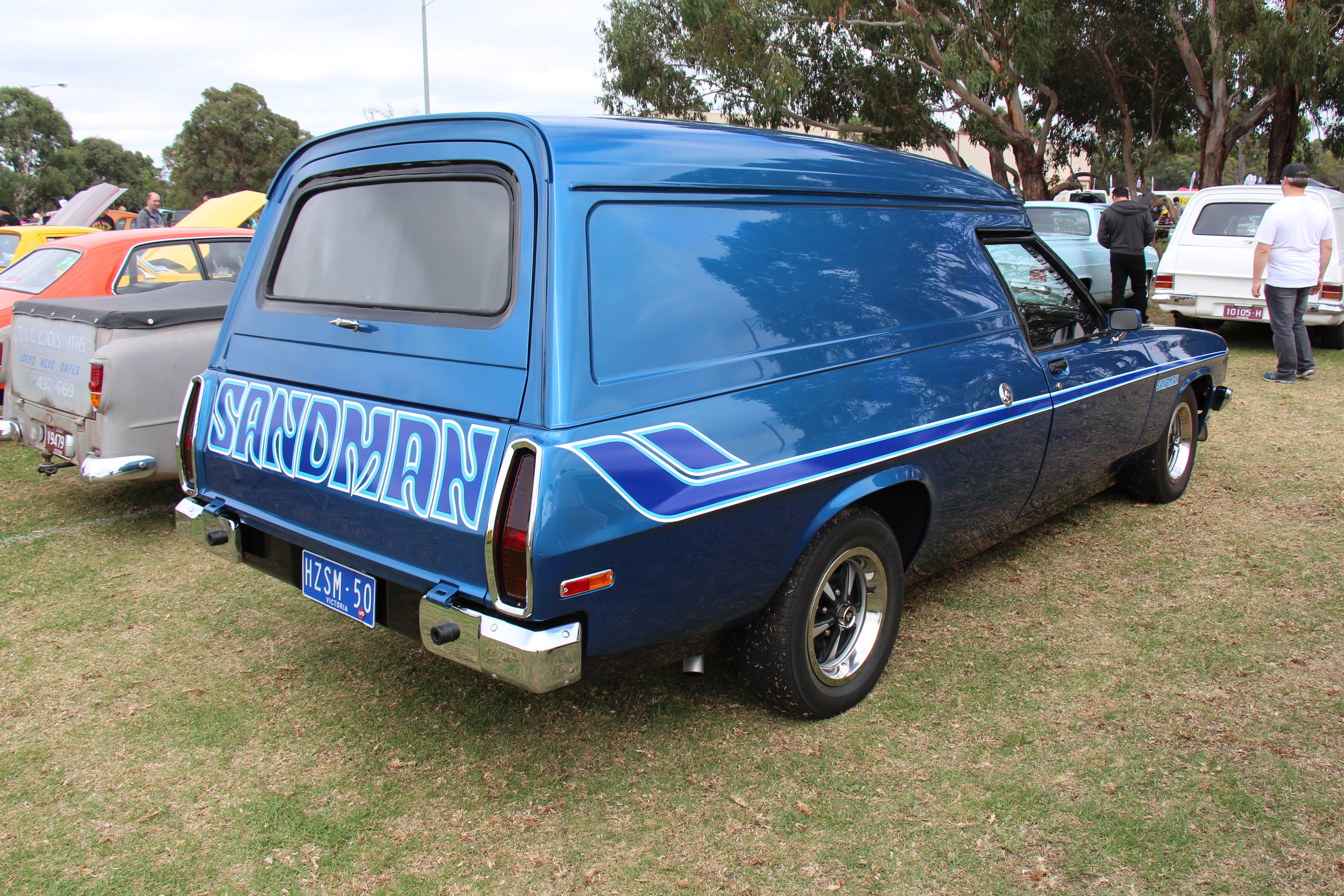
Holden Van with Sandman option

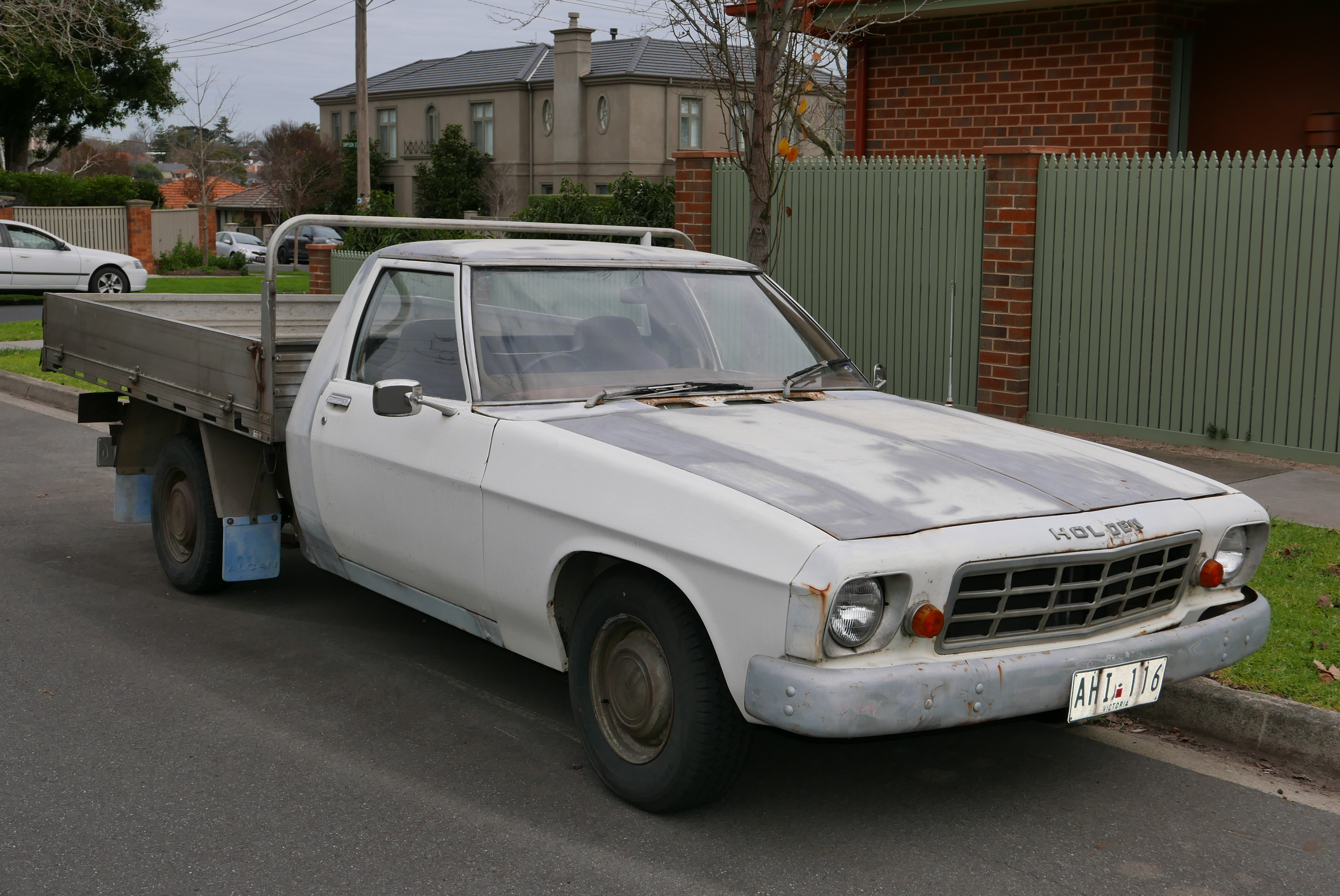
Holden One Tonner cab chassis

== Sandman Ute and Van ==
The final HZ Sandman, featured a choice of V8 engines only, along with a four-headlight grille and under bumper front spoiler. According to a GMH Price List dated 25 January 1979, a basic HZ Holden panel van was priced at $6,076, with the Sandman option package an additional A$1,700. The further optional components also included 5.0-litre V8 engine and a limited slip differential. If a buyer selected every Sandman extra, the price would be more than 150% of the cost of the basic HZ model. By the end of 1979, the Sandman had largely lost its place in the contemporary Australian youth culture – order figures were down and many of the vehicles were now being sold with the stripes and tailgate logos deleted. The Sandman ute was phased out of production prior to the van, the last of which was manufactured around October 1979; later production Sandman vehicles were fitted with alloy wheels as standard equipment, the same as those seen on the HZ Statesman SL/E.

== See also ==
- Statesman HZ
