= Holden Utility (VG) =

Australian coupé utility

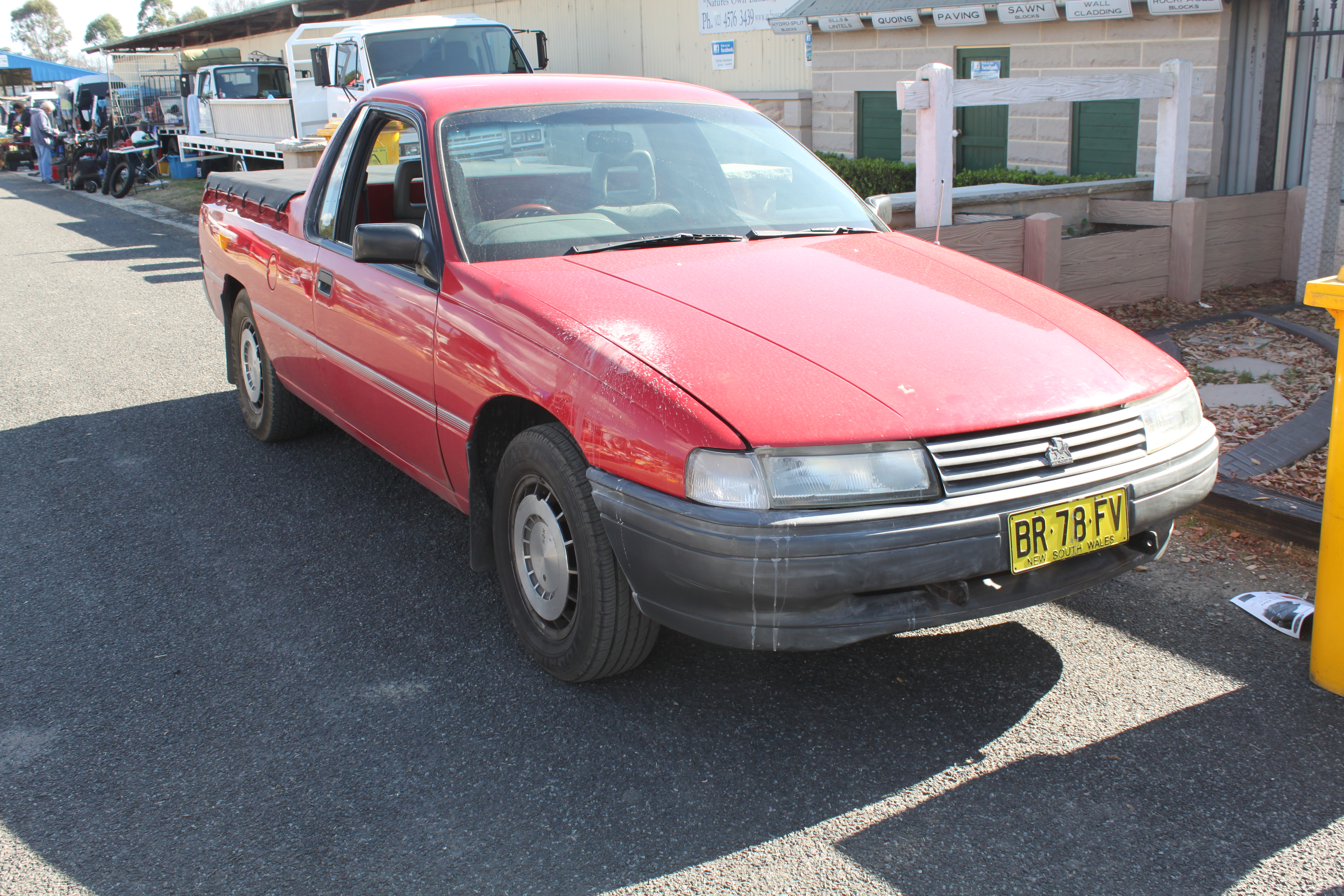
- Holden VG Ute (1990)

Overview
- Manufacturer: Holden (General Motors)
- Also called: Holden Ute (VG)
- Production: August 1990–December 1991
- Assembly: Adelaide, South Australia, Australia (Elizabeth)

Body and chassis
- Class: Coupé utility
- Body style: 2-door utility
- Layout: Front-engine, rear-wheel-drive
- Platform: GM V platform
- Related: Holden Utility; Holden Commodore (VN)

Powertrain
- Engine: 3.8 L 3800 V6; 5.0 L HEC 5000i V8
- Transmission: 5-speed Borg-Warner T-5 manual 4-speed GM Turbo Hydra-Matic 4L60 automatic

Dimensions
- Wheelbase: 2,821 mm (111.1 in)
- Length: 4,903 mm (193.0 in)
- Width: 1,780 mm (70 in)
- Height: 1,512 mm (59.5 in)
- Kerb weight: 1,327 kg (2,926 lb)–1,336 kg (2,945 lb)

Chronology
- Predecessor: Holden WB
- Successor: Holden Ute (VP)

The Holden Utility (VG) is a full-size coupé utility produced by Australian manufacturer Holden from 1990 to 1991. It was based upon the Holden Commodore (VN), it was the first utility in the Commodore range and the first Holden Utility since 1984. It was not badged as part of the Commodore range.

It was replaced by the Holden Ute VP in January 1992.

== Overview ==
Holden had been without a locally designed utility since the demise of the WB series of Holden Utilities in 1984. In the later years of this decade, the Japanese-made Isuzu-sourced Rodeo had been Holden's offering in this market, with the introduction of the new VN Commodore in 1988 that Holden began designing their locally-built replacement.

The VG was built on a lengthened version of the VN chassis, with extra strengthening to cater for the increased payload. Unlike every previous Holden Utility that had used leaf springs for the rear axle, the VG featured a coil spring rear suspension shared with the VN wagon, fitted with helper springs for its payload capacity of 720 kg (1,587 lb).

The VG shared the frontal appearance of the VN Commodore but its 2-door cabin featured a raised roofline.

The base engine was initially the 3.8L LN3 (or HV6) OHV V6, which was replaced in November with the revised L27 (or EV6) version of the engine. The HEC 5000i V8 was available as an option for the Ute S only. Buyers had the choice of either a 4-speed automatic or 5-speed manual available for both the V6 and V8 engines. The VG Utility was also exported to New Zealand.

== Models ==
Buyers had a choice of two models, the base Utility or the sportier Utility S. Unlike the VN sedan, a SS model was not available in the VG range, nor was the VG produced as a Toyota Lexcen.

Total production of all models was 5,690 vehicles.

=== Utility ===
The Utility was the base model of the VG range. Its standard features included:

- 3.8-litre 125 kW (168 hp) V6 engine (Note: The uprated L27 version of this engine was quoted as 127 kW (170 hp))
- 5-speed manual transmission
- Power steering
- Larger 68-litre fuel tank
- Power assisted brakes on all four wheels, 271mm by 21mm vented discs front, 278mm by 10.5mm solid discs rear
- 14 inch steel wheels fitted with P195/75 R-14 95H steel belted radials
- AM/FM radio cassette with 2-speakers
- Height adjustable driver's seat
- Vinyl seat trim
- Rubber cabin flooring

Options included:

- 4-speed automatic transmission
- Air conditioning
- 3-seat bench with column shift (auto only)

=== Utility S ===
The Utility S was the sports variant of the VG range. Its features (in addition to or replacing those of the base Utility) included:

- Tachometer
- Sports trim interior
- Sports badges & exterior striping
- 15 inch alloy wheels fitted with P205/65 R-15 92H steel belted radials
- Larger 289mm by 22mm vented disc brakes (front and rear, V8 only)

Options included:

- 5.0 L 165 kW (221 hp) V8 engine
- Air conditioning
- Metallic Paint

== HSV Range ==
=== Maloo ===
External image
- 1991 Holden Special Vehicles Maloo (VG)

The VG marked the first appearance of HSV's Maloo high performance utility in October 1990. The VG Maloo was powered by an uprated version of Holden's 5.0-litre V8 engine producing 180 kW (241 hp) and 385 N⋅m (284 lb⋅ft) of torque.

The Maloo featured the standard VG's MacPherson-strut front suspension but with revised settings based on HSV's VN SV5000. The five-link live rear axle featured stiffer springs similar to those used in the VL wagon. An alloy sports bar was fitted to the rear tray, reducing payload space and capacity to 592 kg (1,305 lb).

Standard features included:

- Cold air intake
- Dual exhaust
- Larger 327mm by 28mm vented front disc brakes
- 278mm by 28mm vented rear disc brakes
- 16x8 inch alloy wheels fitted with Pirelli low-profile tyres
- Contoured front sports seats
- Momo leather steering wheel
- Soft tonneau cover
- Unique body kit (based on SV3800 and SV89)
- Limited slip differential with 3.08:1 final drive ratio

A total of 132 vehicles were produced.
