= Holden Utility =

Australian coupe utility

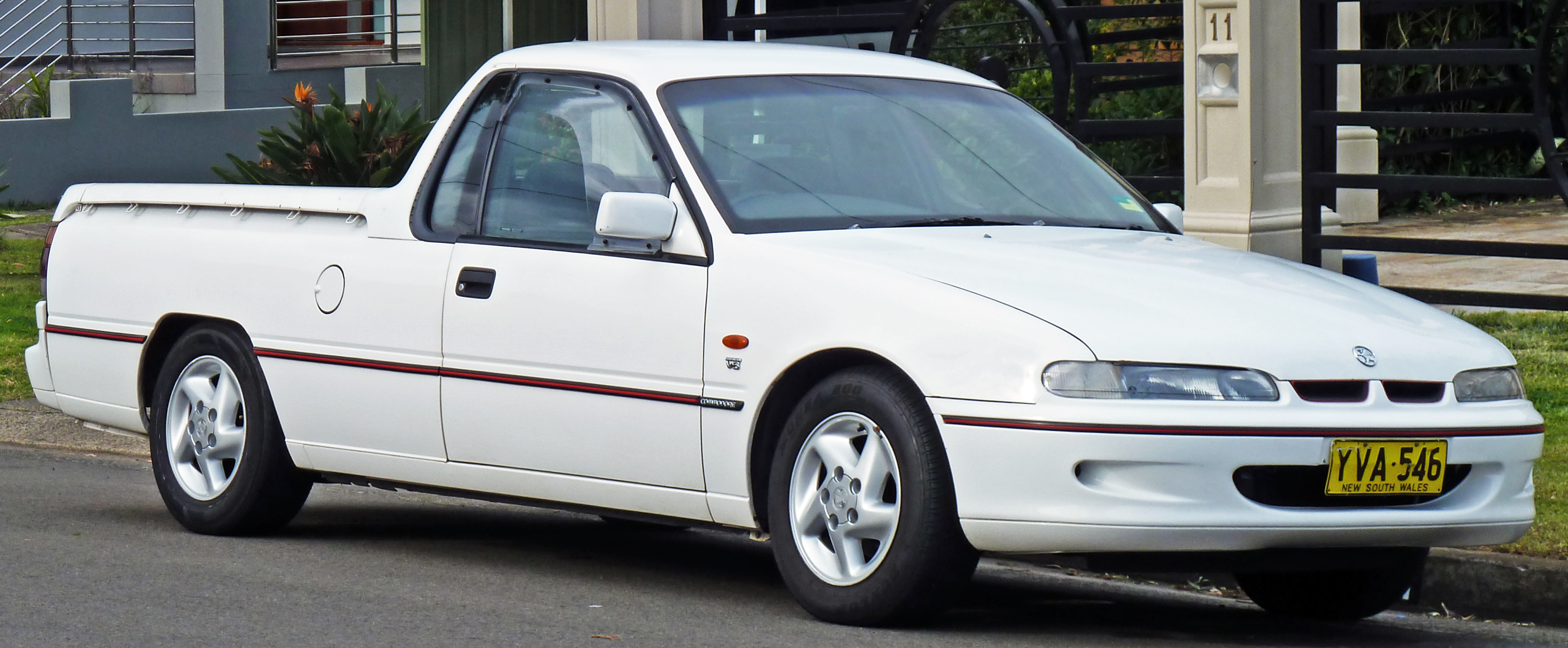

Overview
- Manufacturer: Holden
- Also called: Chevrolet El Camino; Chevrolet El Torro
- Production: 1951–2000

Body and chassis
- Class: Light commercial vehicle
- Body style: 2-door coupe utility; 2-door cab chassis (El Torro)
- Related: Holden Standard; Holden Kingswood; Holden Commodore; Holden Sandman

Chronology
- Successor: Holden Rodeo (for the WB); Holden Ute (for the VS)

The Holden Utility was a coupé utility produced by Holden from 1951 to 2000, being replaced by the Holden Ute. The 50-2106, based on the 48-215 was the first Holden Coupe Utility model.

Holden briefly stopped producing the Holden Utility in 1984 with the end of the Holden WB series, restarting production in 1990 with the Holden Commodore (VN)-based Holden Utility (VG).

== First generation ==
=== 50-2106 ===
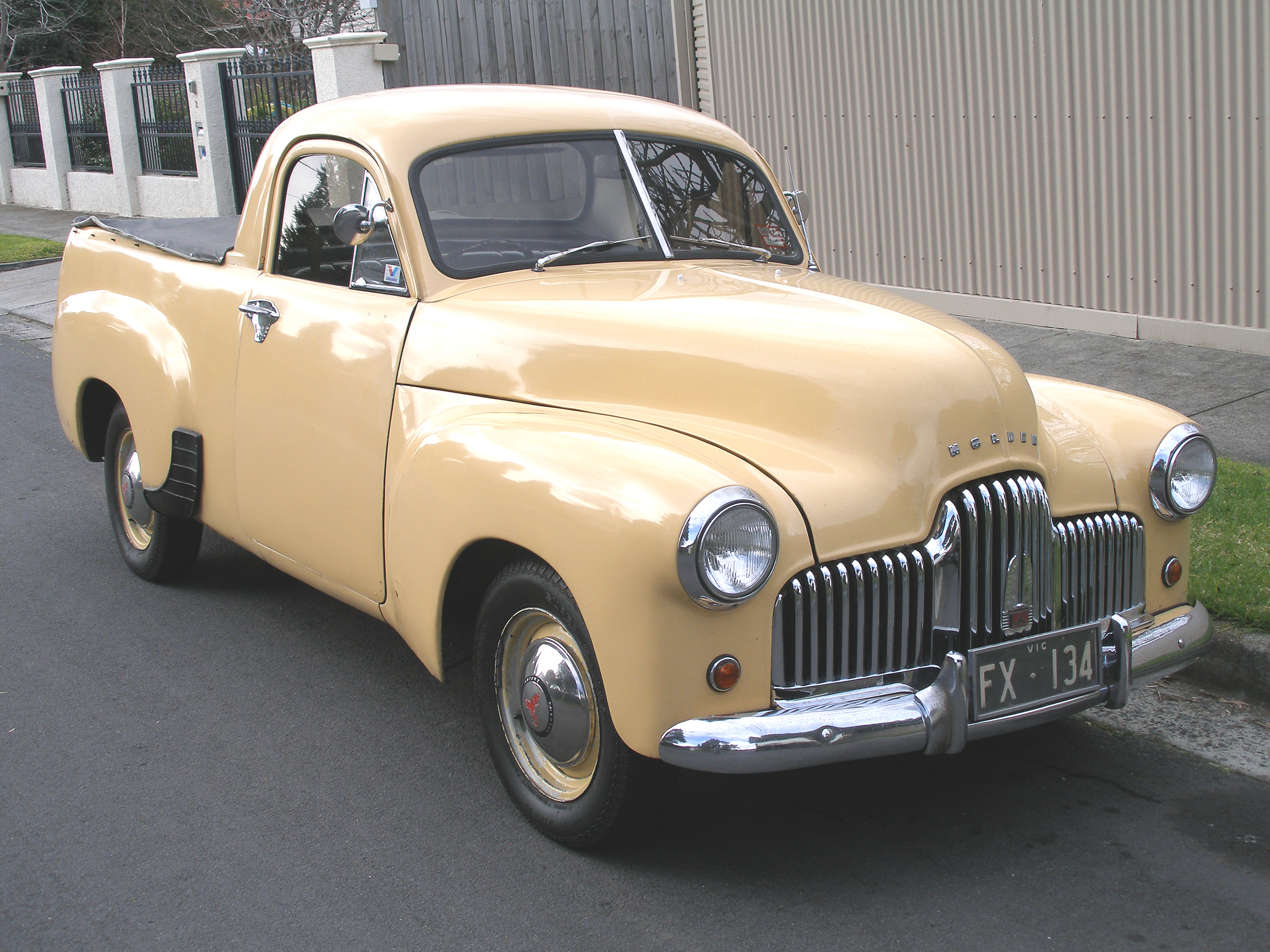
Holden 50-2106

The Holden 50-2106 was produced from 1951 to 1953, based on the Holden 48-215. It was the first Holden Utility.

It was powered by a 2.1-litre Holden Grey Motor straight six producing 45 kW (60 hp) and 135 N⋅m (100 lb⋅ft) of torque, paired with a three-speed manual gearbox. It had 9-inch drum brakes, Hotchkiss drive with semi-elliptical springs, worm and sector steering, and a payload capacity of 356 kg (7 long hundredweight).

=== FJ ===
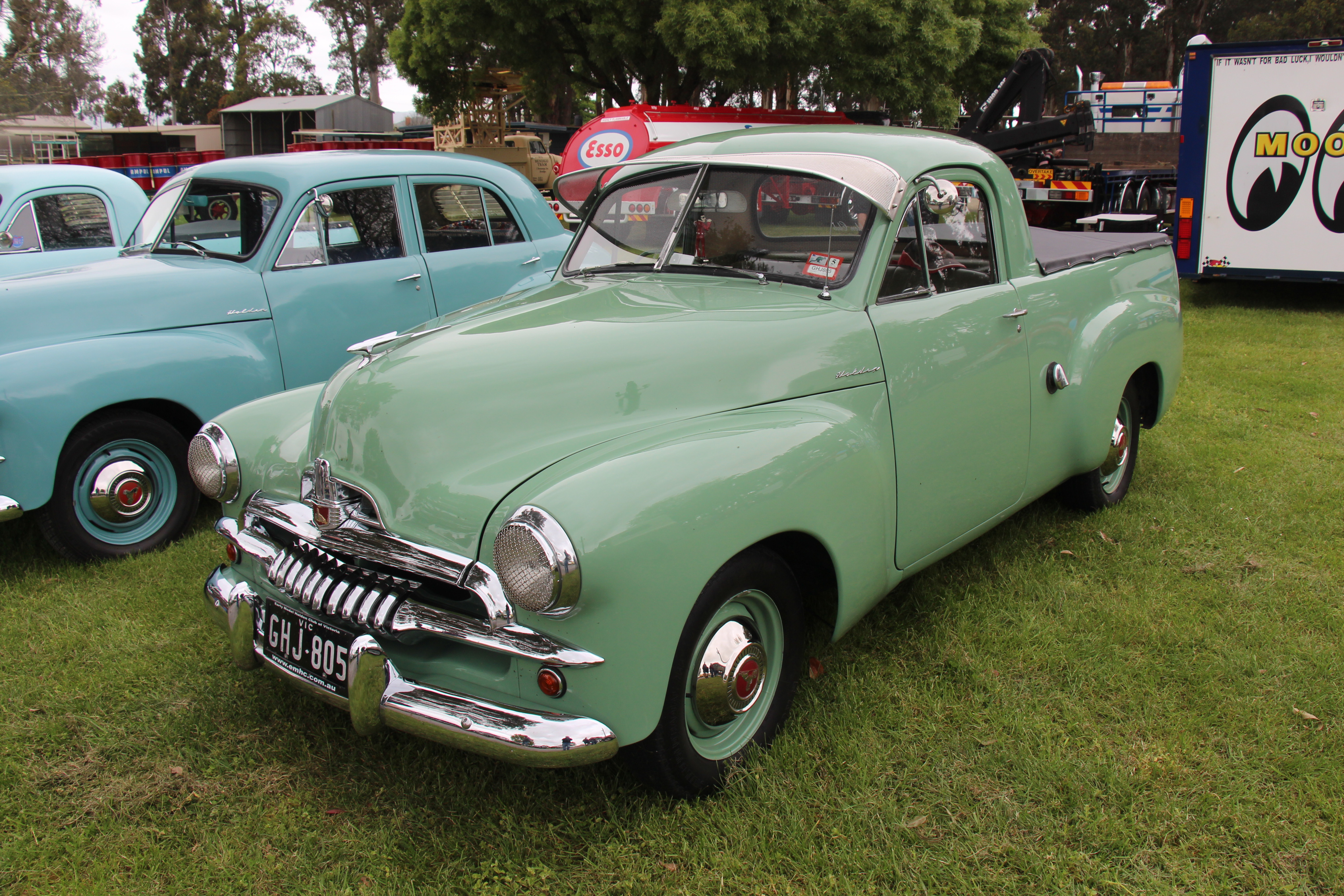
Holden FJ Coupe Utility

The Holden FJ Coupe Utility was produced from 1953 to 1956. It had a 2.2-litre Holden Grey Motor producing 45 kW (60 hp) and 135 N⋅m (100 lb⋅ft) of torque, paired with a three-speed manual gearbox.

== Second generation ==
=== FE ===
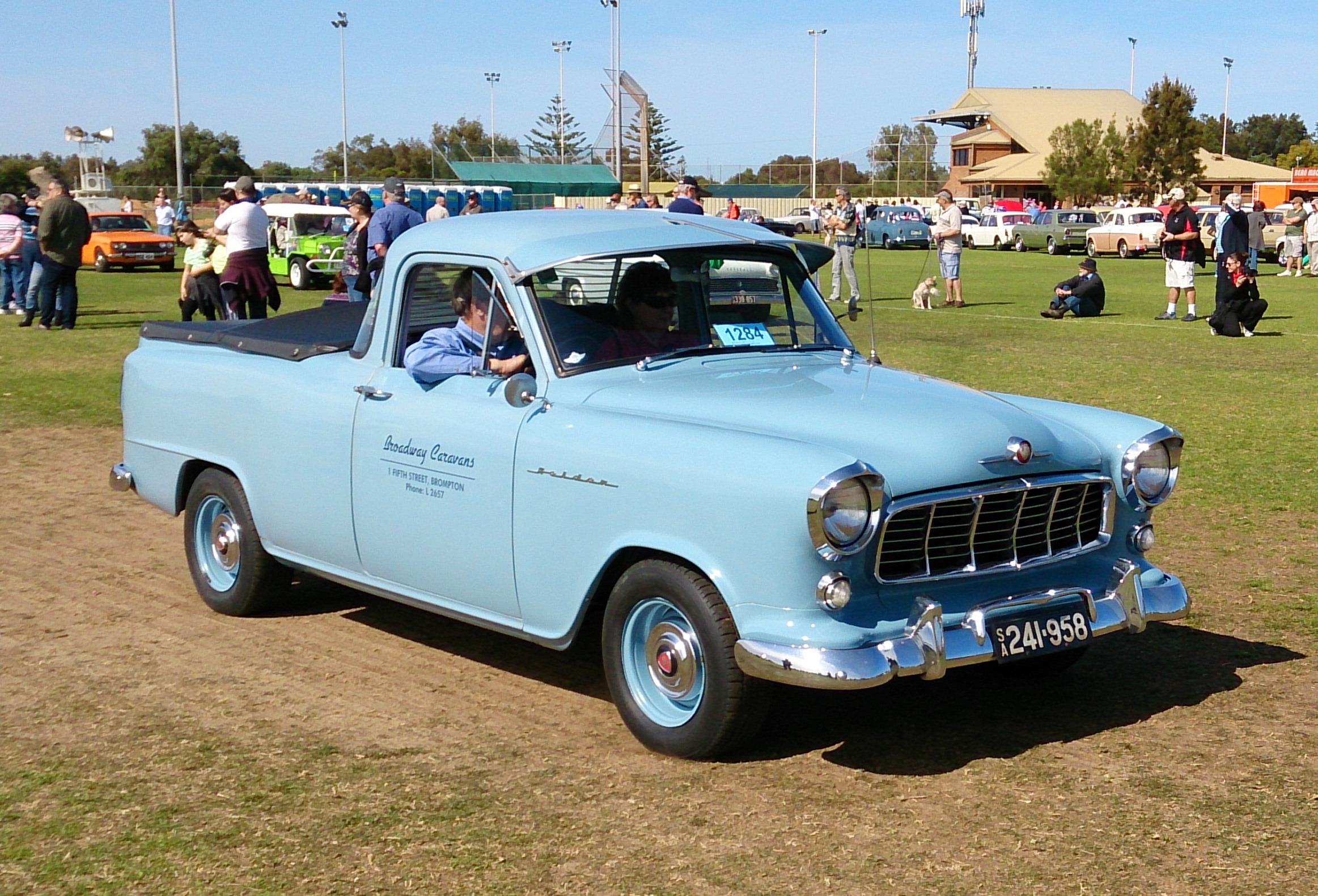
Holden Utility (FE)

The FE Utility was produced from 1957 to 1958. The engine produced 53 kW (71 hp).

=== FC ===
The FC Utility was produced from 1958 to 1960. It was a facelift of the FE. An FC Utility was the 500,000th Holden built in Australia.

=== FB ===
The FB Utility was produced from 1960 to 1961. Engine capacity increased to 2.26-litres, and produced 55 kW (74 hp).

=== EK ===
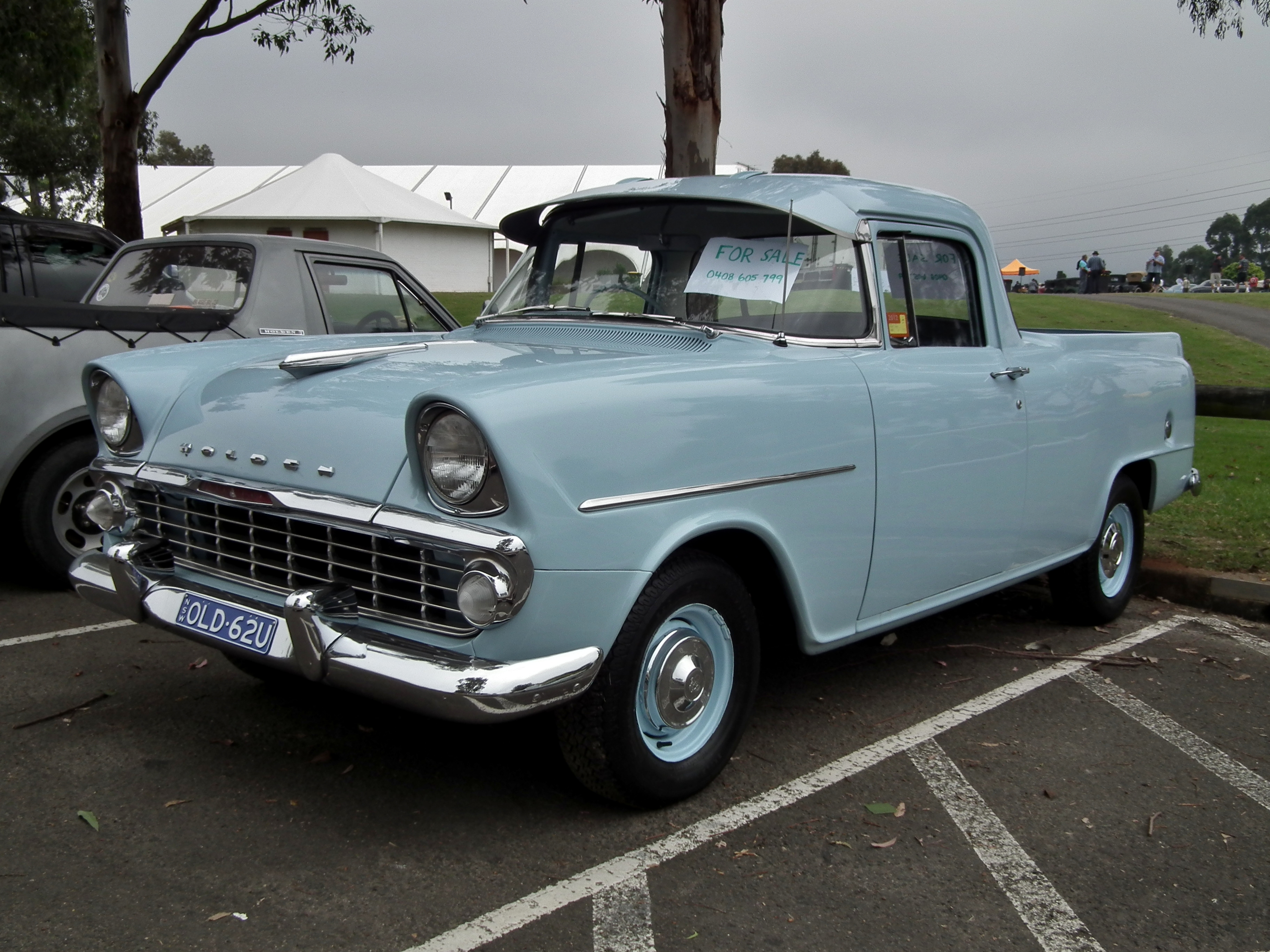
Holden Utility (EK)

The EK was produced from 1961 to 1962. It was a facelift of the FB.

== Third generation ==
=== EJ ===
Holden Utility (EJ)

The Holden EJ Utility was produced from 1962 to 1963. It introduced the 3-speed Hydra-Matic automatic gearbox. It was the last model to use the Holden Grey Motor.

=== EH ===
The Holden EH Utility was produced from 1963 to 1965. It introduced the straight-six Holden Red Motor, the 2.45-litre producing 75 kW (100 hp) and the 2.95-litre 86 kW (115 hp).

=== HD ===
The Holden HD Utility was produced from 1965 to 1966. It introduced optional front disc brakes, a-speed Powerglide automatic gearbox, and replaced was the front kingpin suspension with ball joint suspension.

=== HR ===
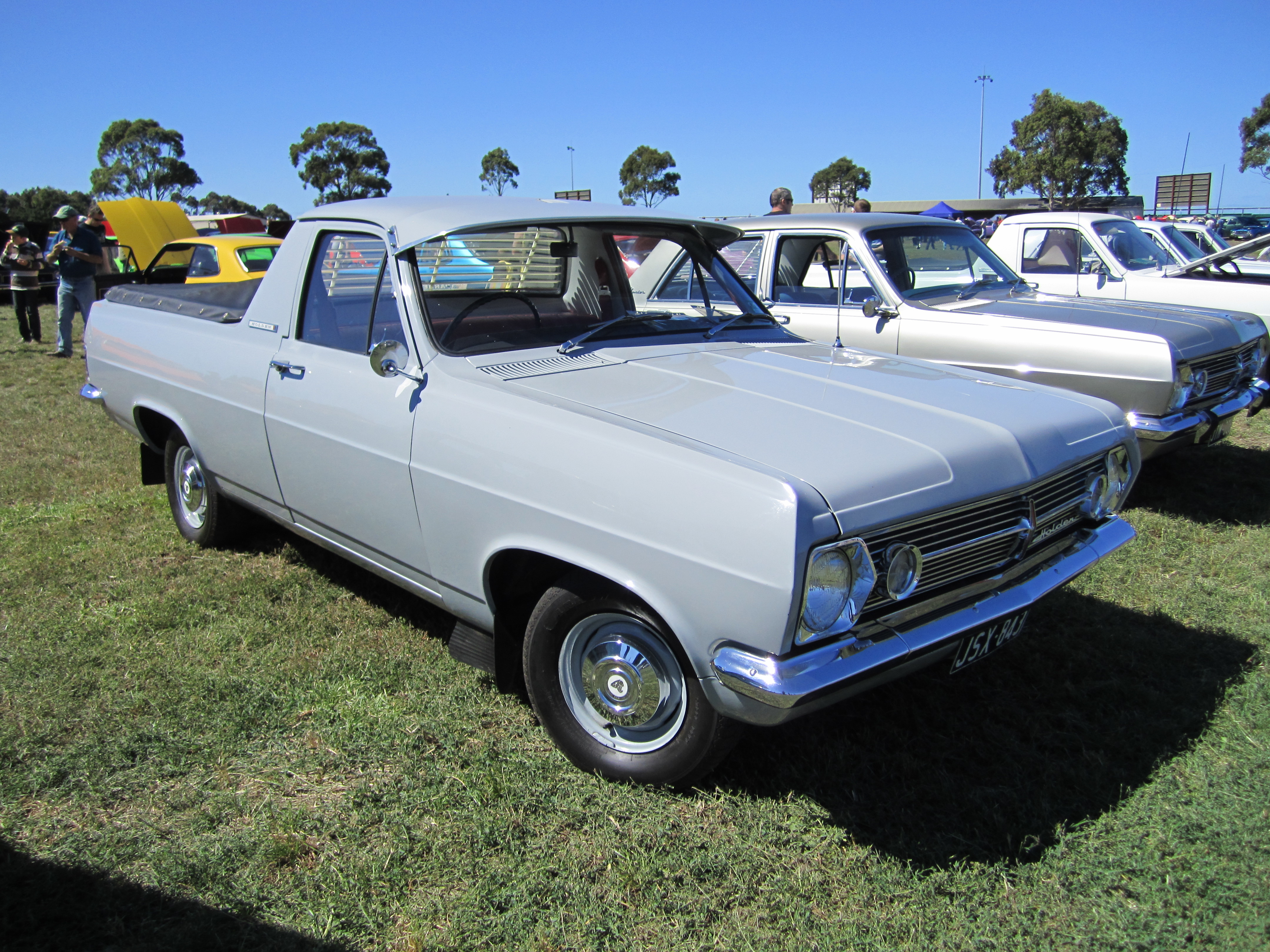
Holden Utility (HR)

The Holden HR Utility was produced from 1966 to 1968. It introduced and seat belts as standard, 4-speed gearbox as an option, and the 6 cylinder 2.65-litre and 3.05-litre engines.

== Fourth generation ==
=== HK ===
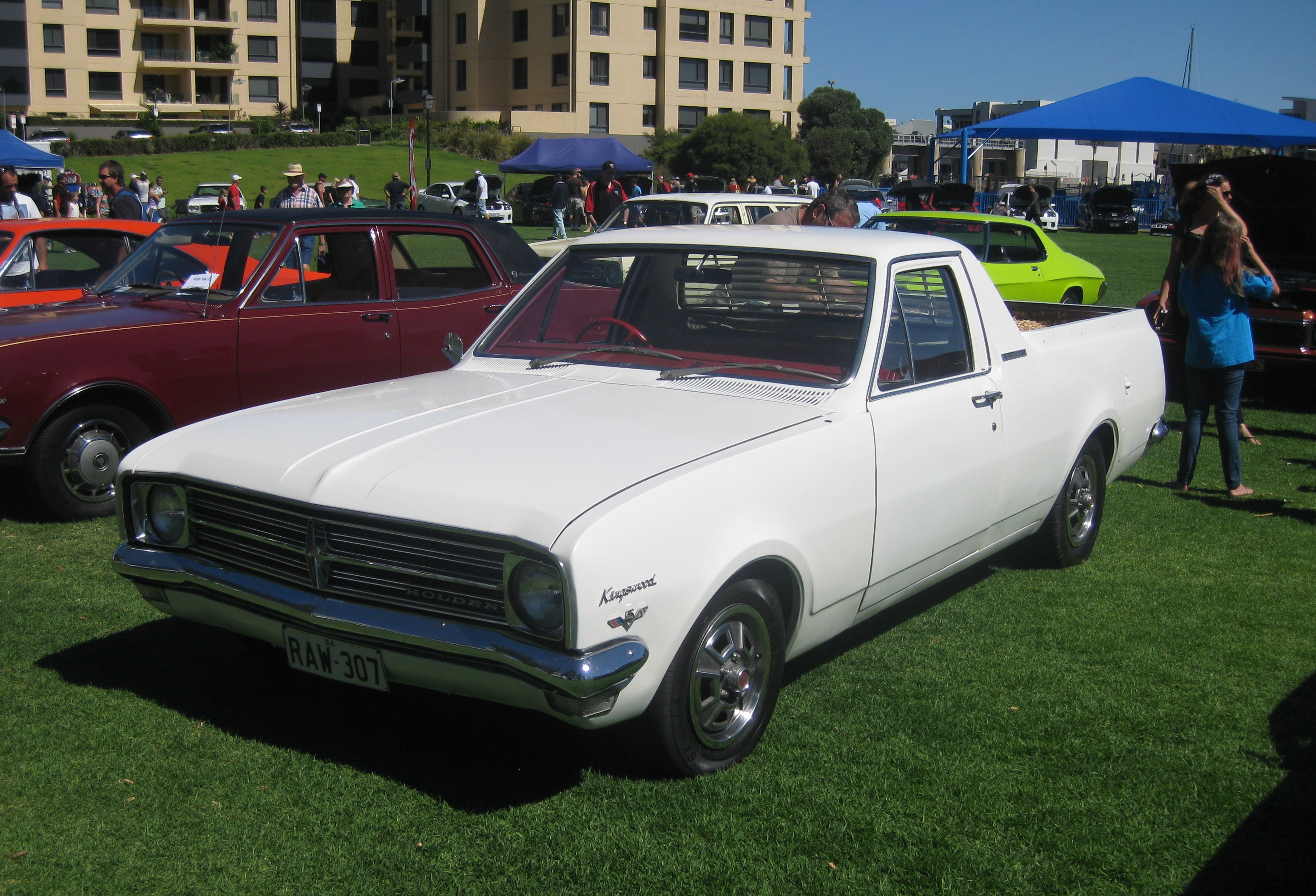
Holden Utility (HK)

The Holden HK Utility was produced from 1968 to 1969. It added options for air conditioning, and the 5.0-litre Chevrolet 307 V8 introduced with the HK. the Kingswood and Belmont nameplates were introduced.

=== HG ===
The Holden HG Utility was produced from 1969 to 1970. It introduced a plastic grille, rubber front suspension bushings. The 4.2-litre Holden 253 and 5.0-litre Holden 308 V8s were introduced.

=== HT ===
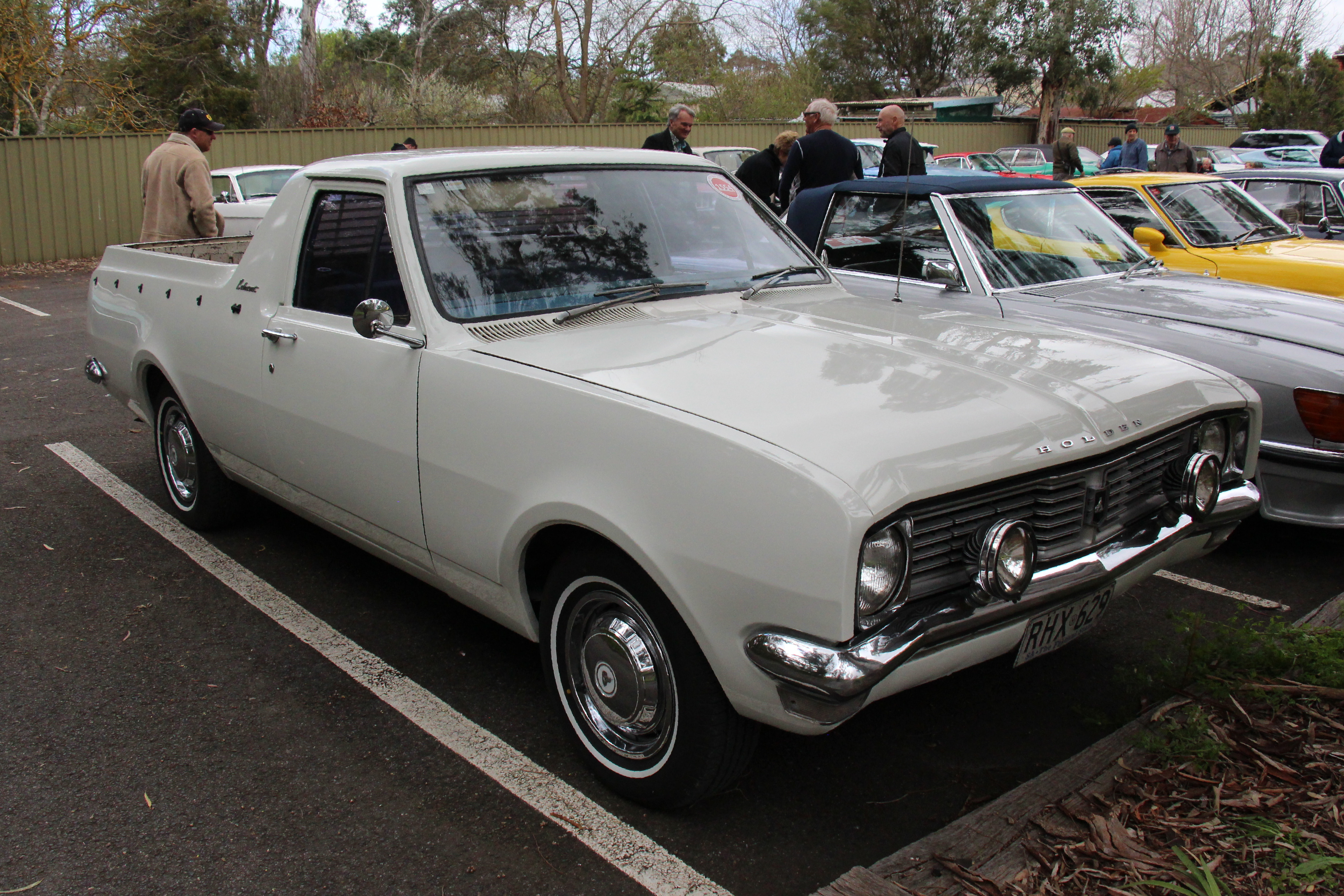
Holden Utility (HT)

The Holden HT Utility was produced from 1970 to 1971. It introduced the optional 3-speed Tri-Matic automatic gearbox.

== Fifth generation ==
=== HQ ===
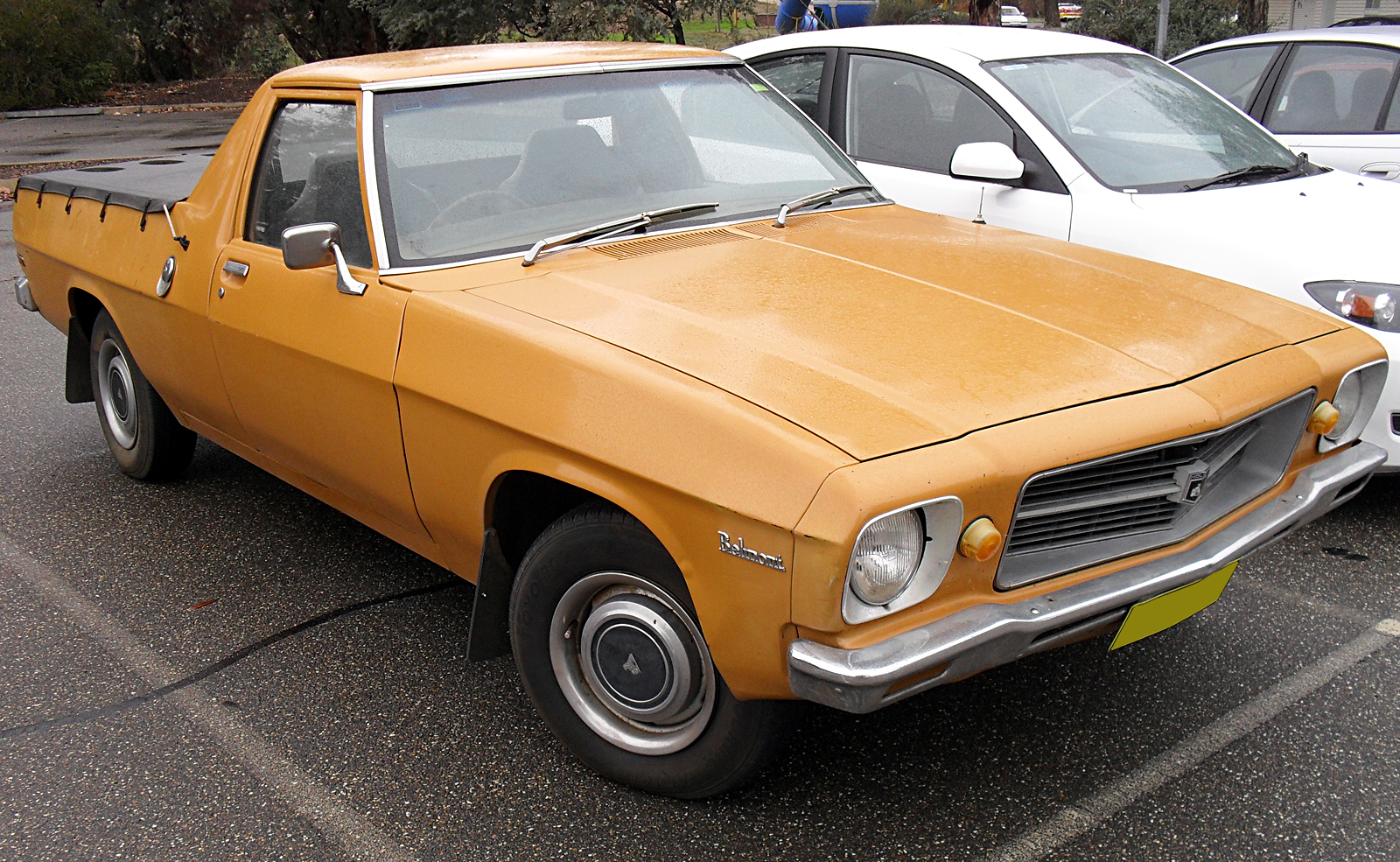
Holden Belmont Utility (HQ)

The Holden HQ Utility produced from 1971 to 1974. It used the longer wheelbase used in the wagon and Statesman.

In 1971 the One Tonner, a cab chassis derivative with a payload capacity over 1,016 kg (1 long ton). In 1974 the Sandman released, with a utility model.

=== HJ ===
The HJ Utility was produced from 1974 to 1976. Belmont nameplate was dropped.

=== HX ===
The HX Utility was produced from 1976 to 1977. The engines were modified to reduce emissions, following the 'ADR27A' Australian Design Rules.

=== HZ ===
The HZ Utility was produced from 1977 to 1980. The 'Radial Tuned Suspension' (RTS) was introduced, improving handling.

=== WB ===
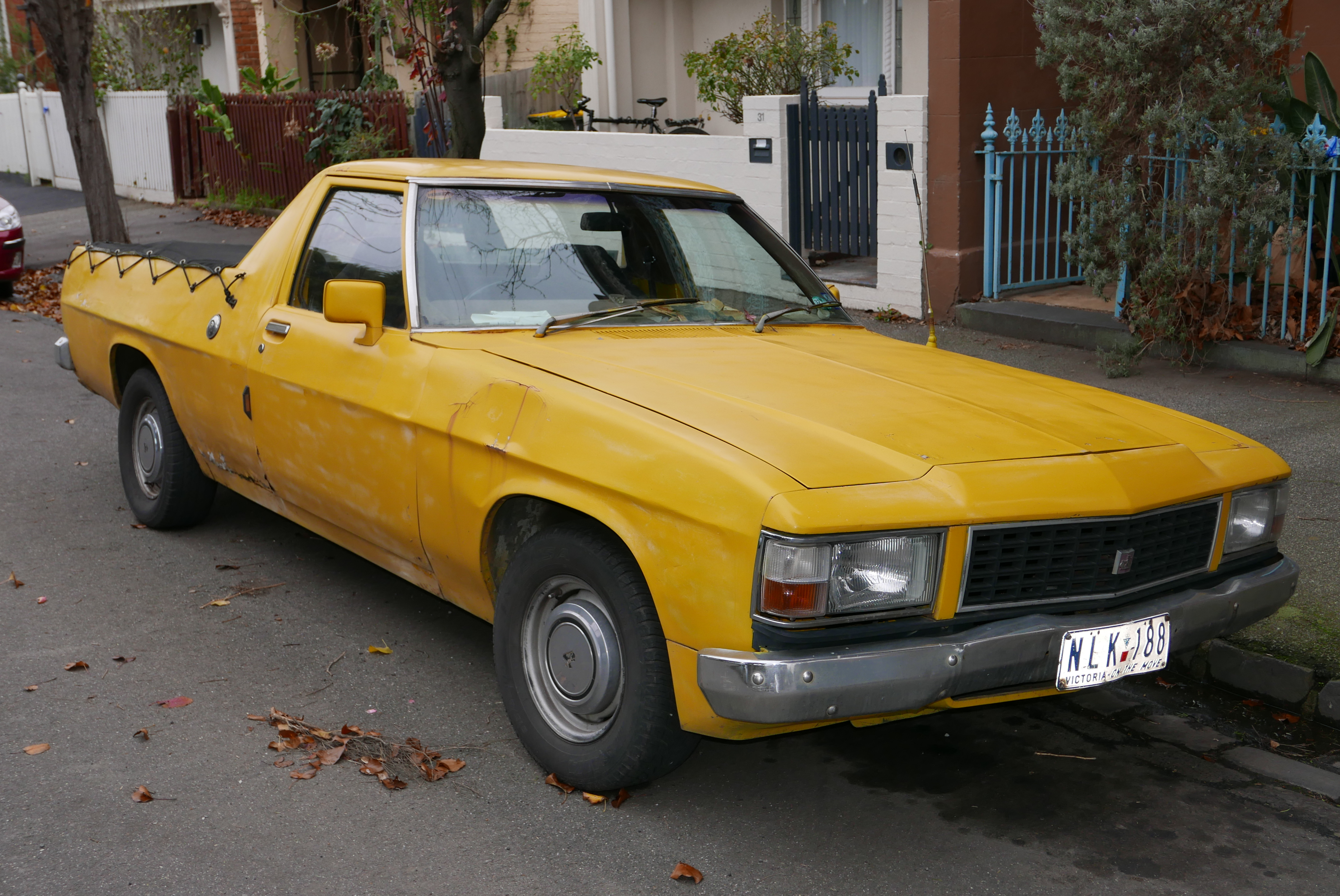
Holden Utility (WB)

The WB Utility was produced from 1980 to 1984. The Holden Blue Motor was introduced.

== Sixth generation ==
=== VG ===
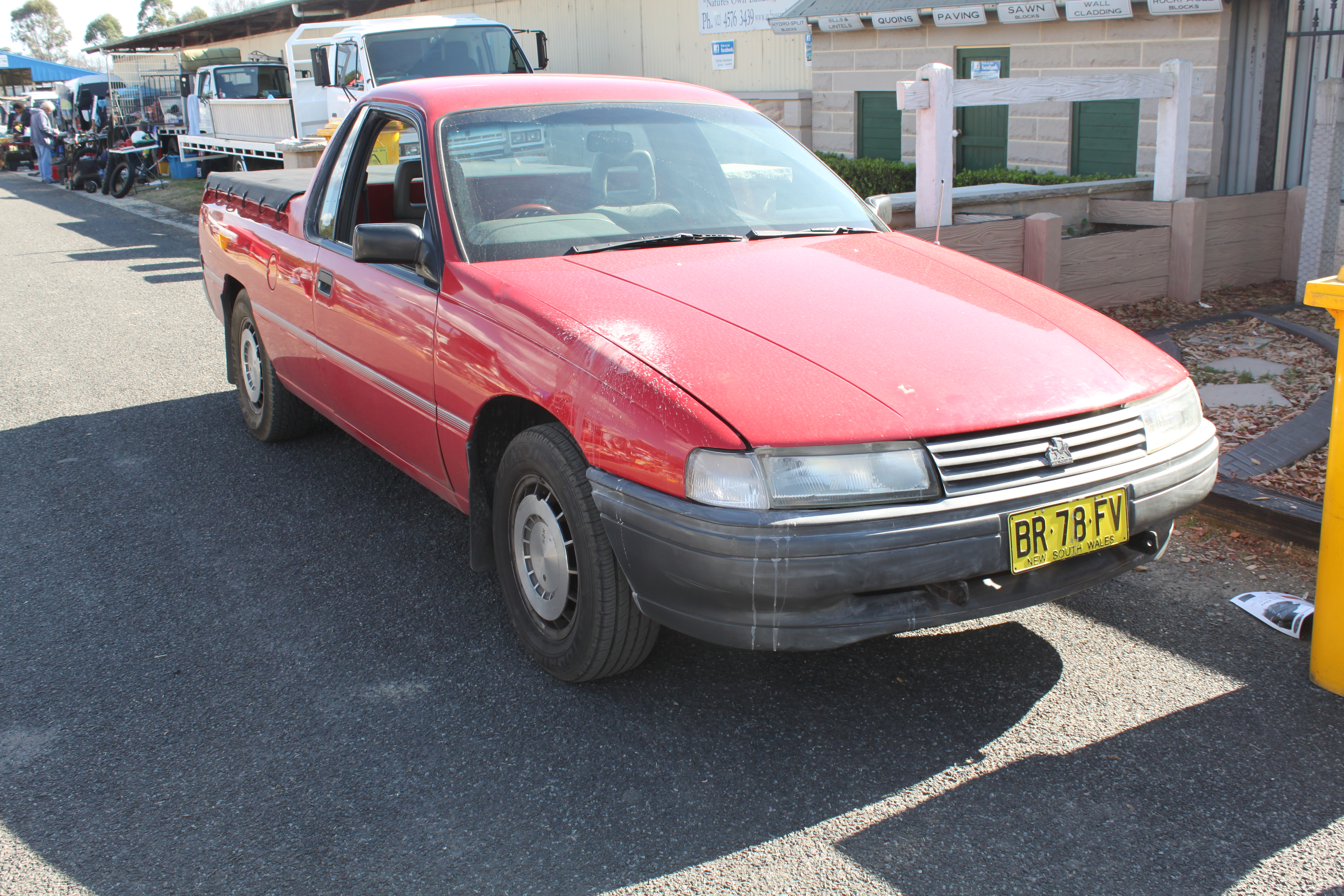
Holden Utility (VG)

The Holden Utility (VG) was produced from 1990 to 1991, based on the Holden Commodore (VN).

The base model Utility was initially powered by a 3.8-litre Buick LN3 V6 producing 125 kW (168 hp), in November 1990 it as replaced by the 3.8-litre Buick L27 V6 producing 127 kW (170 hp). The Utility S was powered by 5.0-litre Holden V8 producing 165 kW (221 hp).

The Holden Utility returned in 1990, as the Holden Utility (VG), based on the VN Commodore.

=== VP ===
The VP Commodore-based ute released in 1992. It was powered by a 3.8-litre V6 producing 127 kW (170 hp).

=== VR ===
The VR Commodore-based ute released in 1993. The power output of the V6 increased, producing 130 kW (174 hp), and had two V8 options, producing 165 kW (221 hp) and 185 kW (248 hp).

=== VS ===
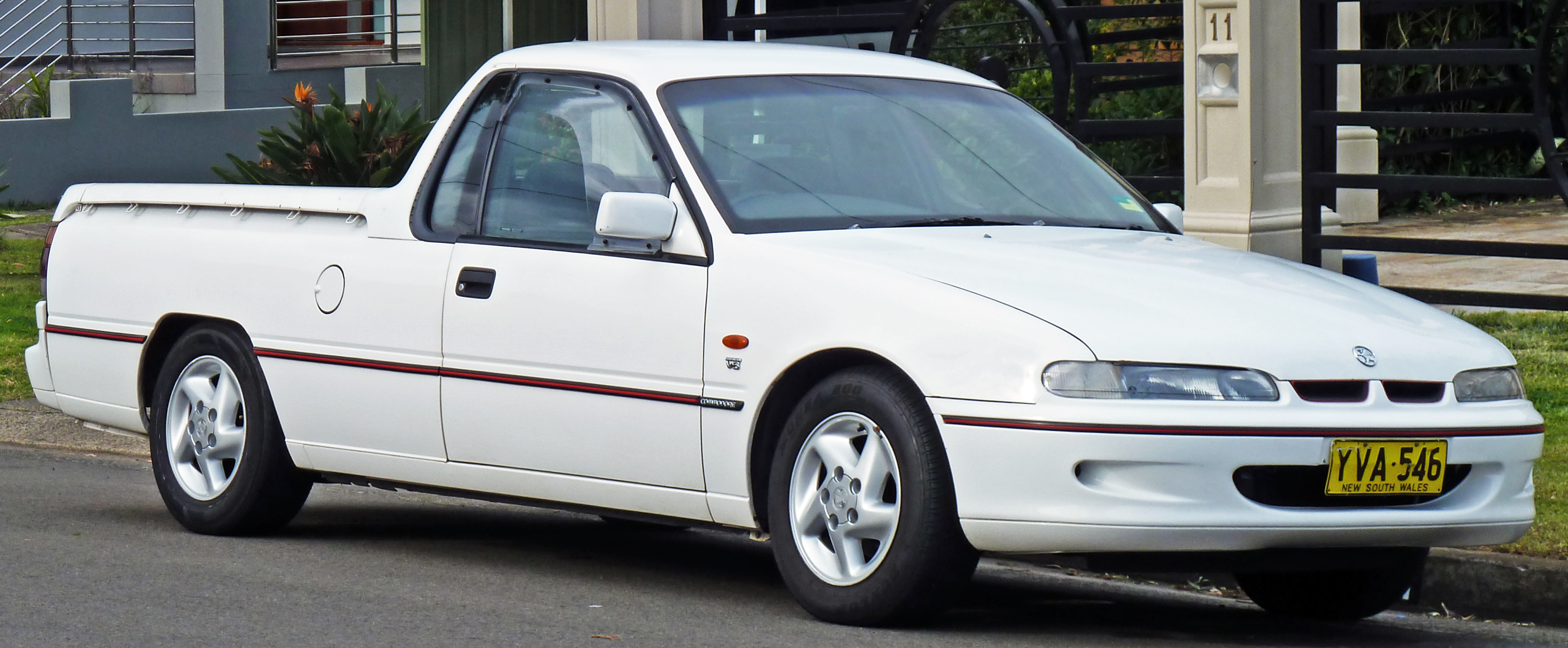
Holden Commodore Utility S (VS II)

The VS Commodore utility was produced from 1995 to 2000, being produced until the introduction of the VU in 2000.

It was powered by a 3.8-litre Buick V6 engine V6 (under the Ecotec name) producing 147 kW (197 hp), the V8 producing 165 kW (221 hp) in Series I, and 169 kW (227 hp) in Series II and III.

== Derivatives ==
=== Holden ===
Sandman

The Holden Sandman was produced from 1974 to 1980, a sports-oriented vehicle produced in panel van and utility variants.

One Tonner

The Holden One Tonner was produced from 1971 to 1984, a cab chassis utility.

=== Chevrolet ===
El Camino

The Holden Utility was sold in South Africa as the Chevrolet El Camino from 1968 to 1978.

El Torro

The Holden One Tonner was sold in South Africa as the Chevrolet El Toro.

== Sales ==
Holden Utility sales in Australia
1991	1992	1993	1994	1995	1996	1997	1998	1999	2000
3,442	3,633	4,045	5,931	7,743	9,142	8,283	8,532	8,342	6,361 (Note: Numbers combine VS Ute and VU Utility, with the Holden Ute (VU) starting production in December 2000)
