= Holden WB =

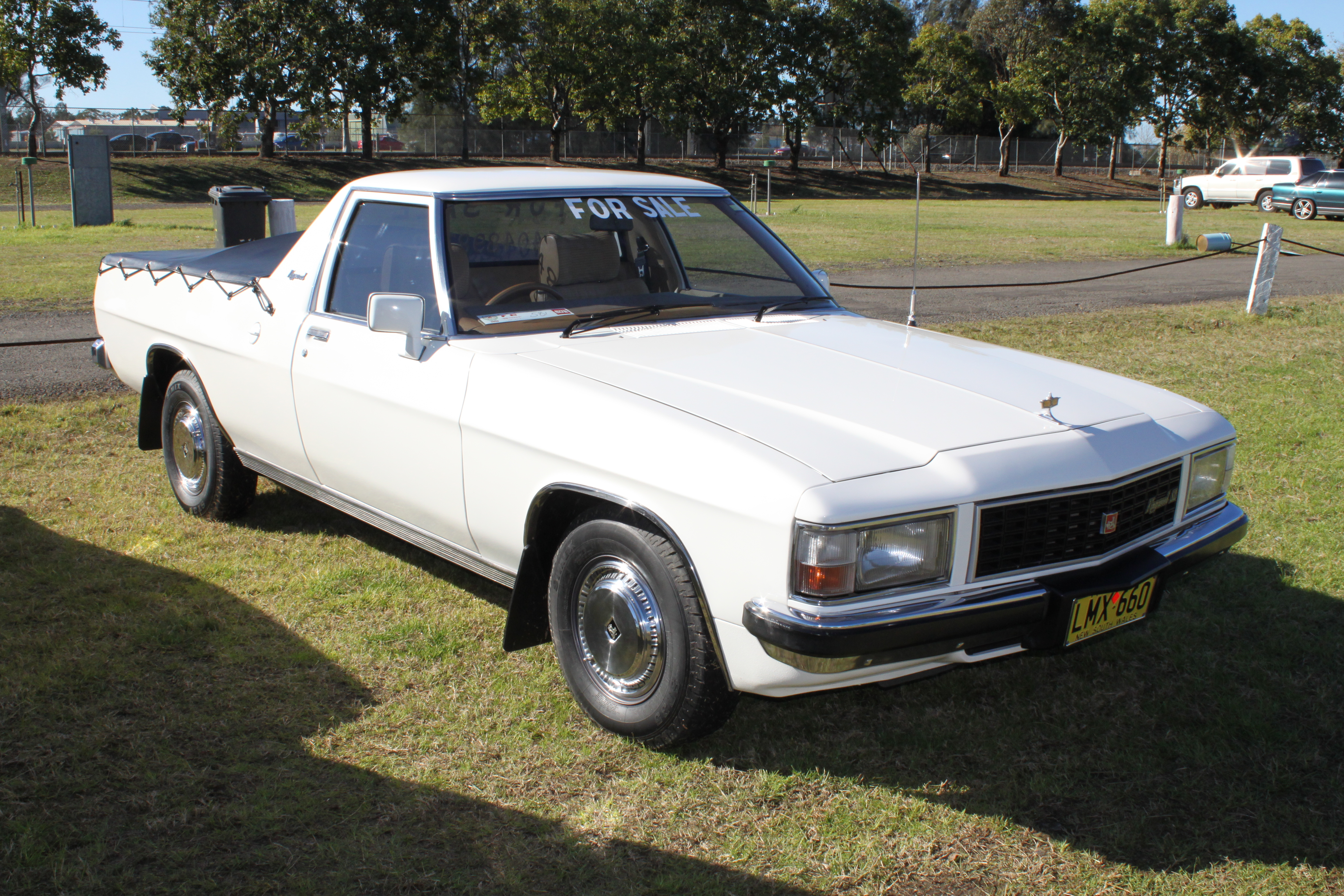
- Holden Kingswood Utility

Overview
- Manufacturer: Holden (General Motors)
- Production: April 1980 – January 1985
- Assembly: Australia: Adelaide, South Australia (Elizabeth), Melbourne, Victoria (Dandenong)

Body and chassis
- Class: Full-size
- Body style: 2-door cab chassis 2-door coupe utility 2-door panel van
- Related: Statesman WB; Holden One Tonner

Powertrain
- Engine: 3.3 L Holden '202' I6; 4.2 L Holden '253' V8; 5.0 L Holden '308' V8
- Transmission: 3-speed manual 4-speed manual 3-speed automatic

Dimensions
- Wheelbase: Cab chassis: 3,058 mm (120.4 in); Utility/van: 2,895 mm (114.0 in)
- Length: Cab chassis: 4,990 mm (196.5 in); Utility/van: 4,940 mm (194.5 in)
- Width: 1,887 mm (74.3 in)
- Height: Cab chassis: 1,420 mm (55.9 in); Utility: 1,395 mm (54.9 in); Van: 1,603 mm (63.1 in)

Chronology
- Predecessor: Holden HZ
- Successor: Holden Rodeo; Holden Utility (VG); Holden Shuttle (panel van); Holden One Tonner (One Tonner)

The Holden WB series is an automobile which was produced by Holden in Australia from 1980 to 1985. It is a facelifted version of the Holden HZ series, which it replaced. Unlike the HZ and every other full size Holden series before it, the Holden WB was only offered in commercial vehicle bodystyles with no sedan or wagon passenger car variants. The long-wheelbase WB series models were marketed under the separate Statesman marque, absent of all Holden branding.

== Model range ==
The Holden WB series was released in April 1980, the range consisting of two coupe utility models, a panel van and a cab chassis truck. The Kingswood panel van, Sandman utility and Sandman panel van models were not carried over from the HZ commercial range. The WB range therefore consisted of:

- Utility
- Van
- Kingswood Utility
- One Tonner (cab chassis)

The Kingswood utility featured a black grate style grille and rectangular headlights, unlike the more basic models which shared a divided grille with circular headlights. In August 1980, the base models received an update which gave them the same frontal treatment as the Kingswood utility.

Plans to produce sedan and wagon versions of the Holden WB reached an advanced stage but ultimately were not pursued. These variants would have supplemented the new Holden Commodore models in the family car market.

=== Statesman ===
The Statesman WB range of long-wheelbase luxury sedans, developed by General Motors-Holden's in parallel with the Holden WB series, was released in May 1980. Like their Statesman HZ predecessors, the two models in the Statesman WB range, the de Ville and the Caprice, were marketed as "Statesman" rather than as "Holden".

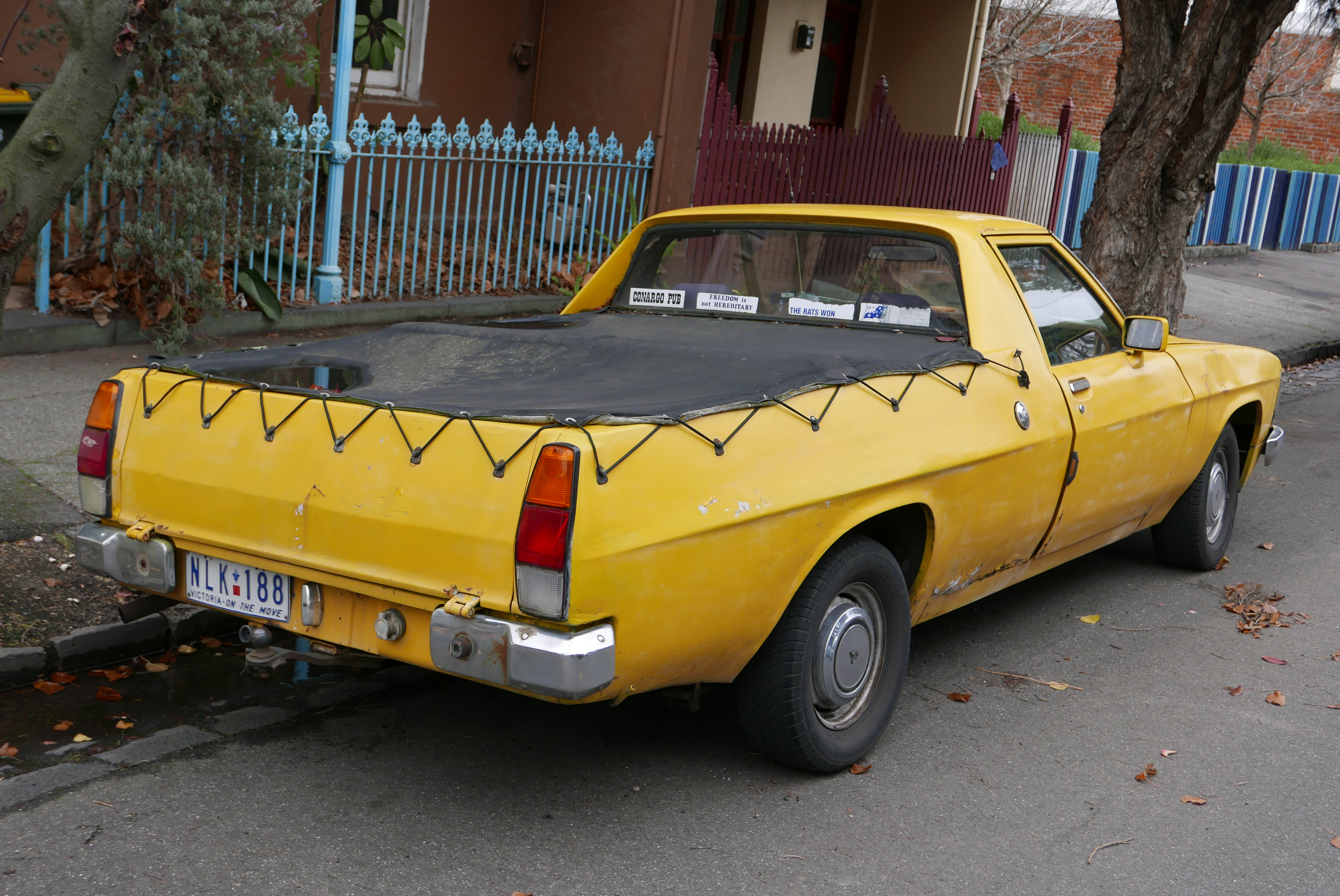
Holden WB utility

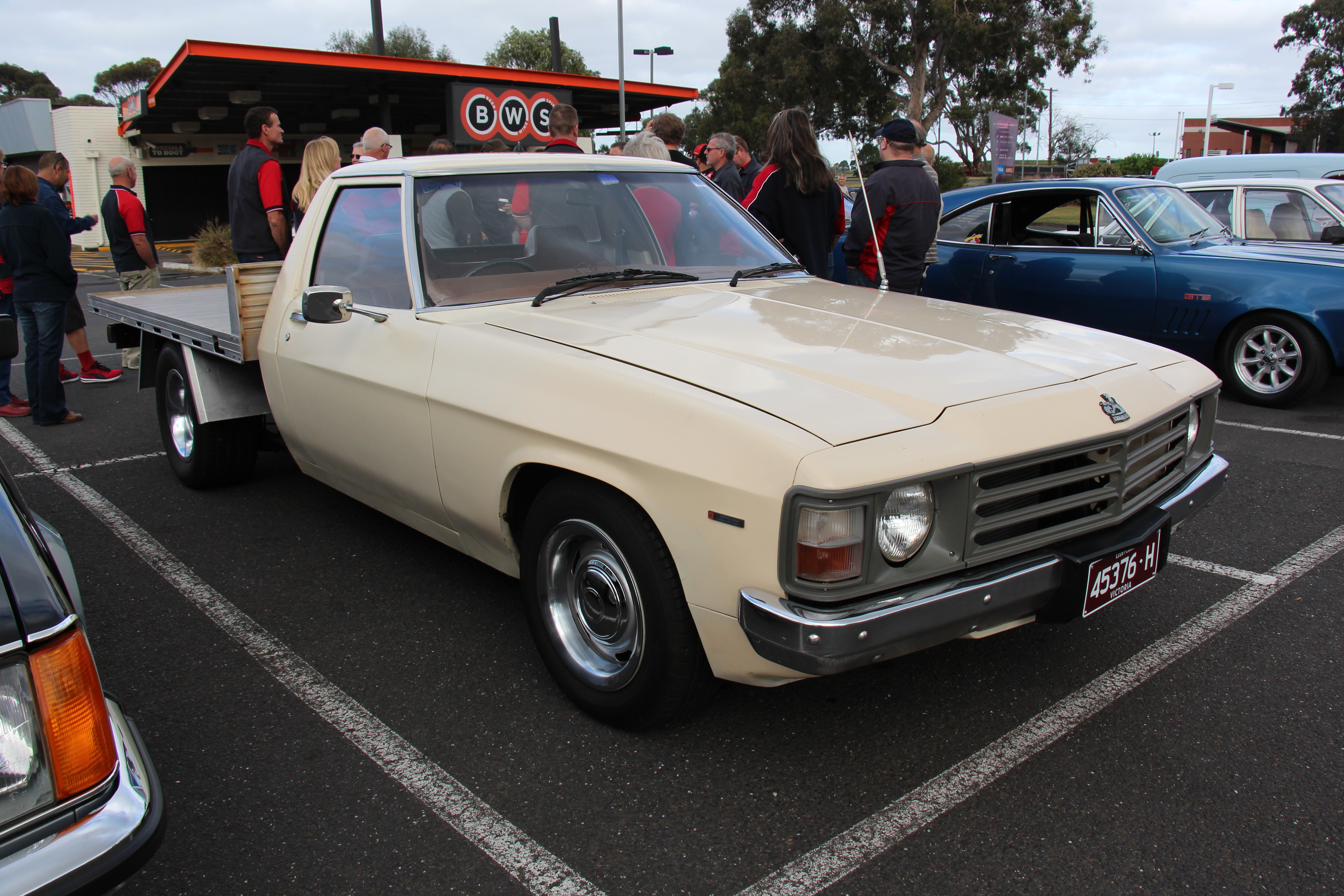
Holden One Tonner (WB), early with circular headlights

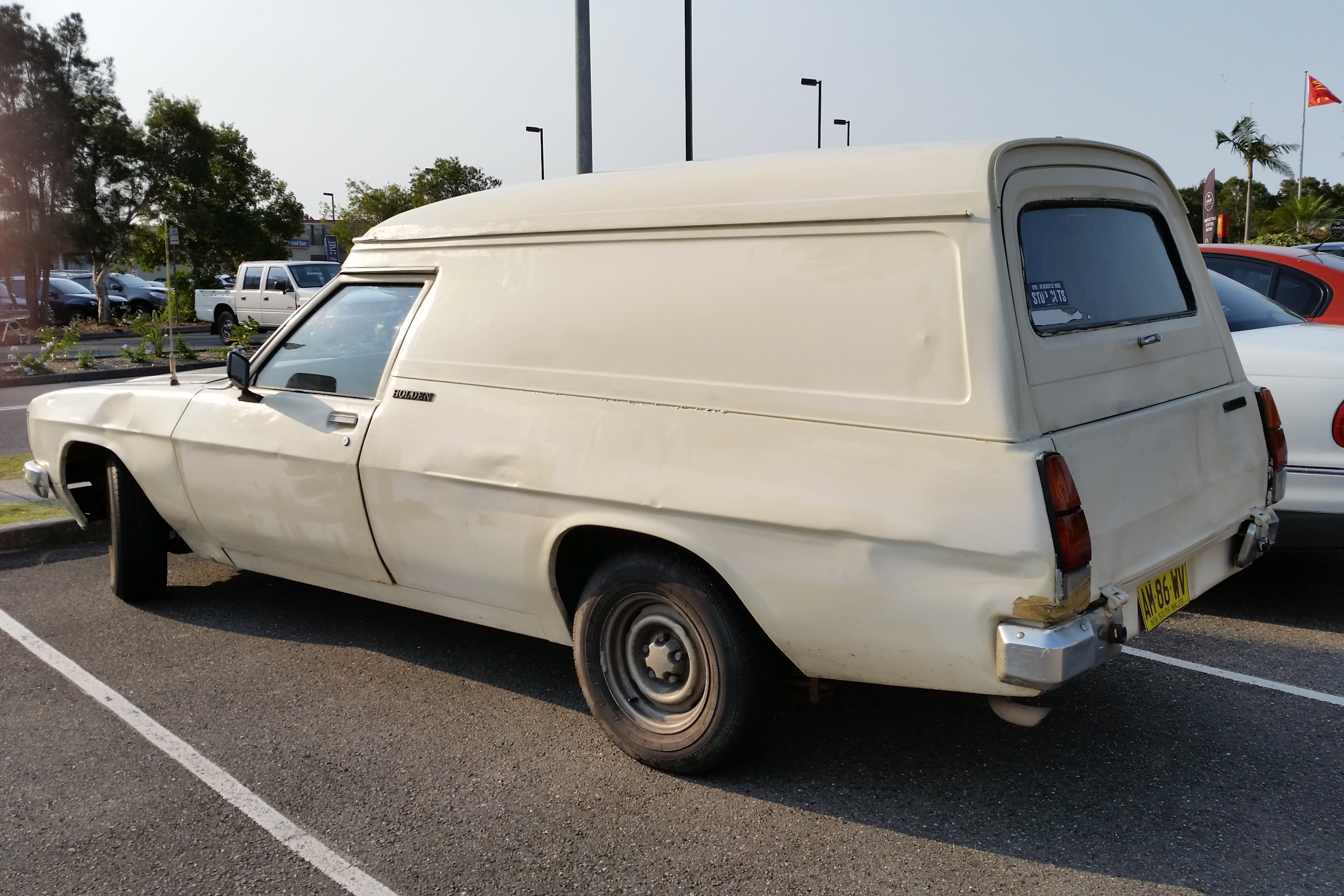
Holden WB panel van

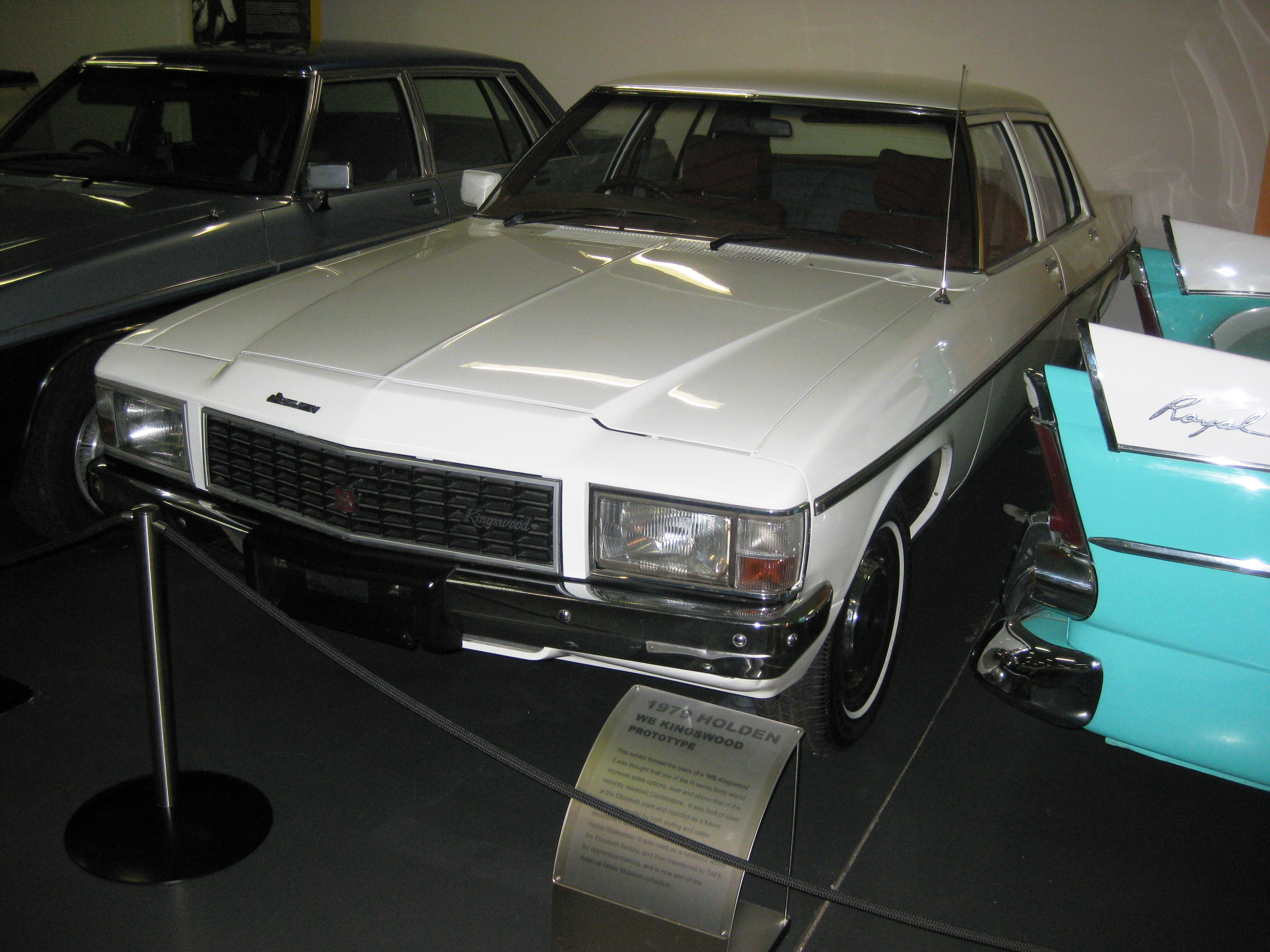
1979 Holden Kingswood (WB) sedan (prototype)

== Powertrain ==
A 3.3-litre inline six cylinder engine was standard equipment and a 4.2-litre V8 was offered as an option. The 5.0-litre V8 option was not carried over from the HZ range, yet was available by special request which was popular with Kingswood model buyers.

== Production ==
The WB series was discontinued in January 1985. Production of the Holden WB and related Statesman WB models totalled 60,231 vehicles. No replacement for the Holden WB was offered initially, bringing to an end a continuous 34-year run of light commercial models based on Holden passenger cars. The gap left by the WB series was then filled by imported and rebadged Isuzu models. This market segment would however be directly contested by Holden again from 1990 when the VN Commodore-based VG Utility was released.
