= Holden V8 engine =

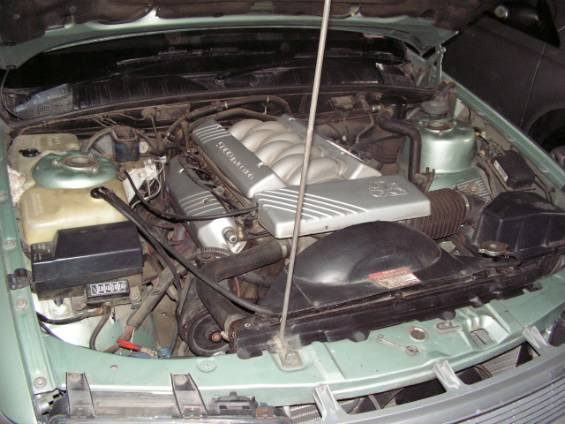
- 5000i engine installed in a 1990 Calais

Overview
- Manufacturer: (Australia) Holden (General Motors)
- Production: 1969–2000

Layout
- Configuration: Naturally aspirated 90° V8
- Displacement: 4,143 cc (253 cu in) (1969–1984); 4,980 cc (304 cu in) (1985–2000); 5,044 cc (308 cu in) (1969–1985); 5,643 cc (344 cu in) (1986–1988); 5,733 cc (350 cu in) (1994–1999)
- Cylinder bore: 3.625 in (92.1 mm); 4.00 in (101.6 mm); 4.03 in (102.4 mm)
- Piston stroke: 3.022 in (76.8 mm); 3.062 in (77.8 mm); 3.375 in (85.7 mm); 3.48 in (88.4 mm)
- Cylinder block material: Cast iron
- Cylinder head material: Cast iron
- Valvetrain: OHV 2 valves per cyl.

Combustion
- Fuel system: Carburettor; Multi-point fuel injection; Sequential fuel injection
- Management: Delco
- Fuel type: Gasoline
- Oil system: Wet sump
- Cooling system: Water-cooled

Chronology
- Predecessor: GM SBC
- Successor: GM Generation III LS1

The Holden V8 engine, also known in some circles colloquially as the Iron Lion (versions from 1969–1985 were also often called the Holden 253 or Holden 308 up until 1974 then Holden 4.2 and Holden 5.0, depending on their capacity), is an overhead valve (OHV) V8 engine that was produced by the Australian General Motors subsidiary, Holden (GMH), between 1969 and 2000.

The engine was initially fitted to the Holden HT series in 1969 and was later utilised in a series of updated versions in the Torana and Commodore ranges. The final iteration, the heavily revised HEC 5000i, was phased out of Holden passenger vehicles with the release of the VT Series II Commodore and the WH Statesman and Caprice in June 1999, both of which featured the 5.7L Gen III V8 imported from the United States. However, the engine remained in production for a little while longer and continued to be available in the Commodore VS Series III utility (which sold alongside the VT sedan and wagon as no similar vehicle was available in that range) until the new generation VU Ute debuted in late 2000.

In addition to being Holden's mainstream performance engine throughout its production run, higher performance versions were fitted to limited-edition vehicles available through Holden Dealer Team Special Vehicles (HDT) and later Holden Special Vehicles (HSV). It was also utilised within limited production vehicles from other manufacturers as well as in kit cars.

The engine has a successful history in various forms of motorsport, most notably in Touring Car racing through the Australian Touring Car Championship and the Bathurst 1000 until 1995, as well as in Formula 5000 and other racing applications such as Sports Sedans.

It can also be found in Australian powerboats fitted with inboard engines, especially those used for water skiing.

== History ==
In 1964 Ford and Chrysler in the US released V8 versions of their respective Falcon and Valiant models which Holden expected to soon be released in locally assembled or produced versions. In response, in January 1965 the company's engineering division initiated a forward engine program review and concluded that by 1969 a V8 option was a necessity for Holden, with forecasts of 35 per cent of all Holdens sold in 1970 to be V8s, rising to 50 per cent by 1975. Initially six capacities from 237–308 cu in (3,880–5,050 cc) were planned over a 12-year life cycle, but early in the design phase this was reduced to just two, an 'economy' 253ci (4143cc) and an enlarged 'performance' 308ci (5044cc) version, which became known as the 4.2L (Note: When converted to metric, although 253 cubic inches translates to 4.146 litres, this engine was always officially referred to by Holden as having a displacement of 4.2 litres, and not 4.1L as mathematical convention would dictate.) and 5.0L respectively.

Design targets of a weight of 525 lb (238 kg), which was lighter than equivalent US engines, and a net output of and 161 hp (120 kW) at 4000rpm and 263 lb⋅ft (357 N⋅m) at 2400rpm were set for the 308, which was mechanically identical to the 253 except for a larger bore and bigger pistons, along with heavier counterweights on the crankshaft to compensate for the increased reciprocating mass. Originally an alloy inlet manifold was specified to reduce weight, but this was changed to iron when problems were encountered in the casting process. The exhaust manifolds were also cast iron but the timing case cover remained as an alloy item.

The initial pre-production engine was the 253, which not only met but greatly exceeded the design targets. The complete engine assembly from fan to flywheel and all auxiliaries weighed in at 460 lb, around 12% less than the design target, while net output for the higher compression (9.0:1) version fitted with a 2-barrel carburettor (Note: More performance could be achieved from a 4-barrel carburettor, but the 253 was seen as the economy engine. Later ADR27A-compliant engines were fitted with a 4-barrel carburettor to compensate for the reduction in power resulting from the new regulations.) was 185 hp (138 kW) with 262 lb.ft of torque, which matched or exceeded the targets set for the larger 308. The design was also very compact with a width of 22 inches, and was only 80 lb heavier than the 186 cu in (3,050 cc) straight six, but producing over 40% (55 hp (41 kW)) more power than that engine in standard form. The first running engine was delivered in October 1966. Unfortunately, the engine failed after just four days testing from a seized oil pump; however, the problem was found to be caused by swarf residue rather than a fault in the design or the quality of the components. Further testing proved that the engine was smoother and more durable than Holden's six cylinder, no mean feat as the 186 was considered a smooth and reliable engine in its day.

The new engines were initially intended to be offered as part of the 1968 Holden HK range, but production issues caused the project to run behind schedule and consequently 307ci Chevrolet engines imported from Canada were used instead. Initially the 283ci engine was to be used but it was replaced in North America for the 1968 GM model year with the 307ci engine - this engine was used instead for HK. GMH had already planned to use the 327ci Chevrolet engine in the HK GTS327 and it would have originally been fitted in the HK range alongside 253 and 308 if things had gone as planned. The 253 made its public debut in the Holden Hurricane concept car at the 1969 Melbourne International Motor Show, albeit it in a highly modified form featuring increased 10.1:1 compression, big cam and solid lifters, and producing over 250 hp (190 kW). The new engines entered mass production soon after in the HT model range, with the 253 being used for manual vehicles whilst the 307 SBC was retained for automatic vehicles. The 308 however debuted in the HT Brougham at the same time but as automatic only (two different imported 350ci Chevrolet engines (auto and manual versions) replaced the 327 and thus the HK GTS327 became the HT GTS350). The 253 was initially only available with a 2-barrel carburettor while the 308 was only ever available with a 4-barrel carburettor (except for when it was used in Bedford trucks in the late 70's). Once the Canadian 307ci engines were used up the 308 became available across all models in the HT range, including the 2-door Monaro coupe. At the same time an automatic option was made available behind the 253 and a manual was available behind the 308 (previously automatic only when 308 was only available in Brougham).

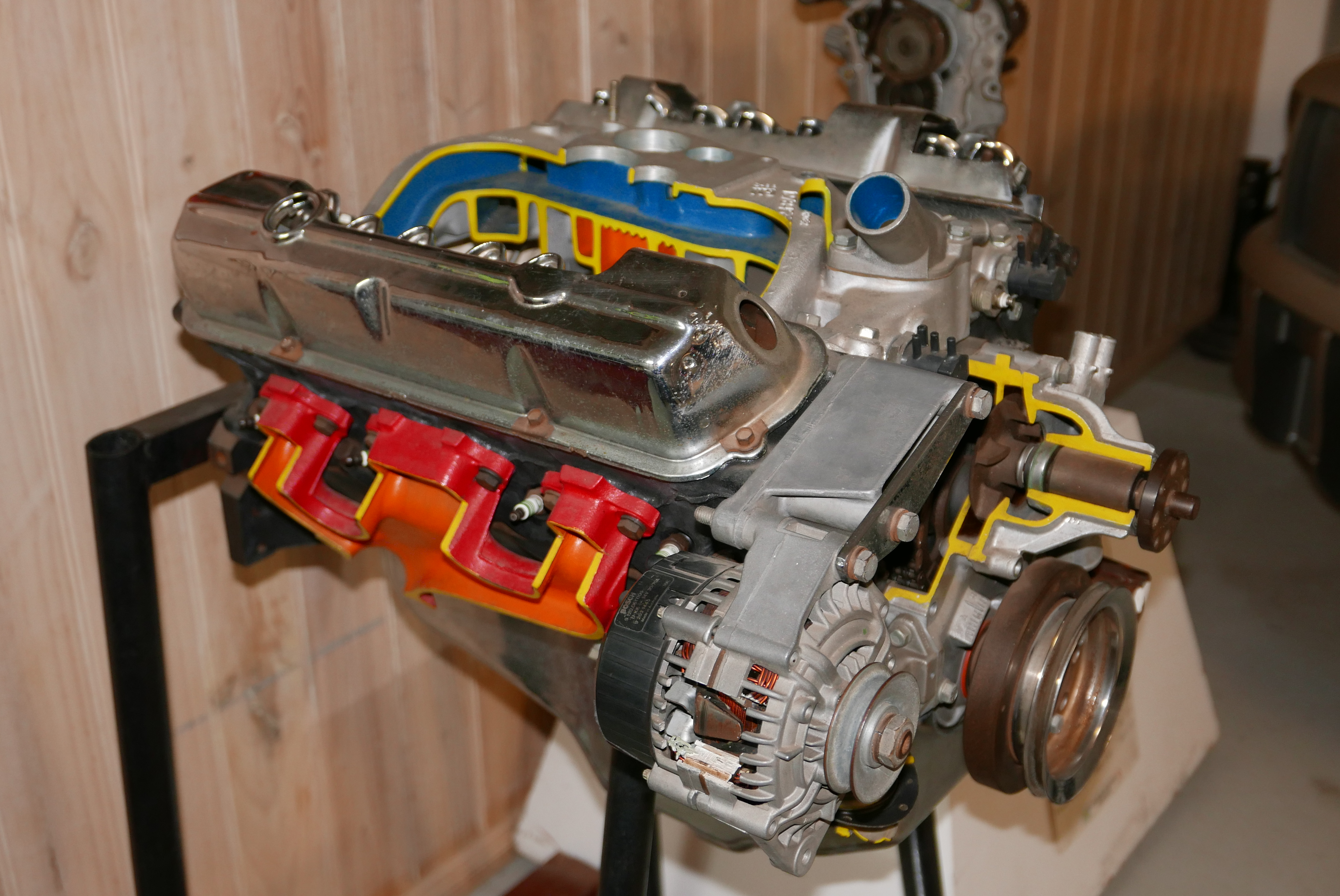
5.0 L; 307.8 cu in (5,044 cc) V8

The 253 and 308 soldiered on essentially unchanged into the HG Holden and HQ Holden Series. The V8 engine also appeared from 1971 in the Statesman range of large size luxury cars which Holden established as a separate marque replacing the Holden-badged Brougham. Initially both the 253 and 308 (and imported 350ci engine) were offered in the HQ V8 Statesman model and 308 standard in HQ Deville but after HQ both the 6cyl and V8 Statesman (Custom) models were dropped leaving the 308 powered HJ Statesman Deville as the base Statesman variety. This continued for the HX, HZ and WB.

At the end of HQ (and earlier for LH Torana release) the 253 and 308 engines were referred to by their metric names: 4.2L and 5.0L. Apart from minor external changes like cable throttle and minor changes to ensure the engine fitted the Torana engine bay the 4.2L engine in HJ and LH was the same as the HQ engine. At the HQ to HJ transition GMH changed the power output figures on all engines from "advertised horsepower" to proper GM20 test "SAE Gross hp". The power ratings on all engines dropped. The HT-HQ advertised power figures for the 253 and 308 were respectively: 185 hp and 240 hp. The SAE Gross figures for these engines was 175 hp and 227 hp. GMH Technical and Engineering literature shows these revised power figures for HJ but it took a while for it to appear in Sales literature - LX Torana release information shows the 4.2L as 175 hp and the 5.0L as 250 hp. The HJ 5.0L was a very different engine to the HT-HQ 308 though. The engine received a lift compression ratio from 9:1 to 9.7:1 and had a new camshaft which was basically the same valve timing as used in the HK-HQ SBC engines (prior to HJ the 308 used the 253's smaller camshaft but retarded 5 degrees). The revised 5.0L was SAE Gross rated as 250 hp which was a 23 hp gain on the HQ 308. In LH SLR5000 Toranas built after HJ release and LX SLR5000 and SS with RPO L31 built prior to HX Holden this revised 5.0L engine created a very fast car. The revised 5.0L engine performed so well that GMH dropped the planned 400ci engine from HJ Caprice and other optioned HJ Holden as the emissions strangled 400ci SBC out of North America was no improvement over the local 5.0L. The flip side of the extra power and torque meant that the Trimatic transmission that was used prior to HJ was not strong enough for the revised 5.0L in a full size Holden or Statesman and it was replaced with the imported TH400 transmission.

In 1974, both the 253 and 308 engines (now called 4.2L and 5.0L) were added to the Torana range for the first time in the LH series (after an aborted attempt by Holden Dealer Team boss Harry Firth to introduce the V8 to the smaller LJ in 1972 which was stopped by the "supercar scare"). In fact the SLR5000 only weighed 40kg more than the XU-1. Some of the lower performance Toranas were light, but the six-cylinder LJ XU-1 weighs 1140 kg while the SLR5000 L34 only weighed 1180 kg with the high performance V8. The engines were also offered on the revised LX released in 1976, which from July of that year saw emission-controlled versions of the 'Red' engines introduced to comply with the new ADR27A regulations on fuel and exhaust emissions. The V8 was dropped as an option in the final model in the Torana series, the UC released in 1978. There was a high performance version of the 308 engine built in 1973 by Repco for the Formula 5000 series. It was built as a 302ci (4940cc) engine using a slightly smaller bore than the production 308 (3.960" versus the 308's 4"). It was a much stronger block than the production block and featured 4 bolt mains and 11.7:1 compression with either Lucas fuel injection or Weber carburettors. GMH asked REPCO to use some of the ideas and parts for this engine and produced the higher performance 308 engine (engine code L34). The LH SLR5000 was released that used a standard 5.0L engine. A little while into LH, GMH built a limited number of SLR5000 vehicles (263) with an engine code L34 along with a whole host of other parts fitted for the manufacturer's championship endurance rounds. To comply with racing rules the car had to raced as manufactured with no further engine modifications. The whole car was homologated. The A9x used the L34 motor. Due to the Supercar scare the car which was the fastest production car in the world (in the future all hot 308s would be aftermarket delivered not standard Holden production engines) was still lower in HP. It had more power than most of its combinations in the future mainly due to its high compression motor. It had larger valves, and a four-barrel inlet, 750cfm carb. Due to the rules of the day race teams could put any carby with same number of venturis and modify the exhaust from the first join. As delivered the standard exhaust headers were not particularly efficient and lowered the cars power output as delivered down to near stock. However, when set up for racing this engine produced excellent amounts of power. Cam and carby were unrestricted so the cars internals where heavy duty and designed to maximise airflow, but cam, carby and exhaust restrictions due to CAMS racing rules lowered the engines optimum output. The L34 was never advertised except when journalists from' Wheels Magazine' found out about it. GMH ensured that only CAMS licensed teams could buy one. The car eventually was nicknamed the L34. The letters L34 were the engine code, and the car would soon be referred by the code from now on. The L34 had the code on the model plate there is nothing on an A9X that states it's an A9X and the A9X had to use the L34 motor from an L34 to race.

In 1978 with the introduction of the new smaller Commodore as Holden's family car, the final versions of the 'Red' 253 and 308 were available with the initial VB. In 1980 the revised VC saw the introduction of the revised 'Blue' series of engines, available in both capacities, which continued through to the VH in 1982. The VC also saw the introduction of high-performance versions of the engine but mostly L34 parts still. All performance parts on parts list at HDT state L34. in limited-edition vehicles produced in partnership with Peter Brock's Holden Dealer Team (HDT), with various models subsequently appearing through to the VL range in 1987, when relations between the two companies soured and Holden severed its ties with HDT.

With the release of the 'Black' engine in the VK Commodore in 1984, the 253 was dropped as an option and the 308 was the only capacity of the V8 now available in the Commodore. However, the smaller engine continued to be available in the Holden WB commercial vehicles e.g. the One Tonner cab chassis until the end of 1984. In 1985, a destroked version of the 308, known as the 304 (4980cc) but still sold as a 5.0L engine, was introduced to allow the VK to compete with a lower minimum weight (1,325 kg (2,921.1 lb), a saving of 75 kg) under the 4501-5000cc regulations of Group A touring car racing (in Group A racing, the destroked 'HDT' version of the engine was known as a 4.9 litre).

In 1988 fuel injection appeared for the first time on a Holden V8 engine, on the VL Commodore SS Group A produced by Holden Special Vehicles (HSV), Holden's new performance partnership with British-based Tom Walkinshaw Racing (TWR); however, this was not a standard production engine, which still continued to feature a carburettor. Later that year the VN introduced the 5000i engine with new cylinder heads and multi-point fuel injection which represented the most extensive redesign of the standard production Holden V8 since its launch in 1969. This engine continued in all subsequent Commodores until 1999 (2000 for the VS Series III Ute), when it was replaced by the US-made all-alloy Gen III LS1 5.7L V8 in the VT Series II.

== Design ==
The Holden V8 is a water-cooled naturally-aspirated 4-stroke gasoline engine featuring eight cylinders arranged in a 90 degrees vee-formation. It is an overhead valve design featuring two valves per cylinder with a camshaft centrally located in the engine block above the crankshaft, driven by a timing chain attached to toothed sprockets, with the camshaft in turn driving the distributor and oil pump. Valve actuation is by hydraulic lifters and pushrods to rocker arms (roller lifters in some models) in the cylinder heads; the lifter bore angle in the engine block is 45 degrees from the block centerline. A belt-driven radiator fan and water pump are located on the front of the engine block taking drive from the main pulley, as is the alternator. The cast iron engine block features a separate pressed steel non-stress bearing sump assembly with the crankshaft located within five main bearing journals secured with 2-bolt bearing caps; 4-bolt main bearing caps featured on later performance versions.

Aftermarket Holden V8 alloy cylinder heads showing different valve layouts; pre-1988 (top) and post-1988 (bottom)

The cast iron cylinder heads are a cross-flow design with wedge-shaped combustion chambers and a single spark plug. In early versions of the engine the inlet and exhaust valves were arranged in a "mirrored" configuration around a longitudinal midpoint in each head i.e. I-E-I-E-E-I-E-I. The co-located exhaust valves in the two centre combustion chambers resulted in a "hot spot" making the heads prone to warping or cracking, especially in performance versions of the engine. For the fuel-injected 5000i version introduced in the 1988 VN Commodore, the cylinder heads were redesigned to a repeated I-E design (a similar layout was previously utilised for the HSV VL Group A SV) for all combustion chambers, delivering better heat distribution and thus greater reliability.

Depending upon the application, induction was either carburettor or fuel-injection (multi-point or sequential, depending on the year). For the 1986 VL Commodore, the engine was modified to run on unleaded fuel which carried forth to all subsequent models.

== Applications ==
Initially offered in 4.1 and 5.0 L; 252.8 and 307.8 cu in (4,142 and 5,044 cc) versions, the engines were intended to be offered as part of the 1968 Holden HK range, but the project ran behind schedule and instead became part of the 1969 HT model range. In the HT, the Holden V8 sold alongside the 350-cubic-inch (5.7 L) Chevrolet Small-Block engine until 1974 with the introduction of the HJ series.

The V8 engine also appeared from 1971 in the Statesman range of large size luxury cars which Holden established as a separate marque, replacing the Holden badged Brougham. In 1974, both the 253 and 308 engines were added to the Torana range for the first time in the LH series (after an aborted attempt by Holden Dealer Team boss Harry Firth to introduce the V8 to the smaller LJ Torana range in 1972 which was stopped by the Supercar scare). The engines were also offered on the LX model range introduced in 1976, but not the final UC range which appeared in 1978.

Both engine capacities were offered on the first VB Commodores which appeared in 1978. The 253 version was not available in the VK Commodore range, released in 1984, but continued in Holden WB commercials until their cessation in late 1984. In 1985, the special editions modified by Holden and their official after-market tuner, Peter Brock's HDT Special Vehicles, began introducing the 304 cu in (4,980 cc) version of the engine, created to slip underneath the 305 cu in (5,000 cc) engine capacity cut-off in Group A touring car regulations, allowing Commodore competitors to run at a lower competition weight. This slight shrinking of the traditional Holden 308 saw the Group A Commodore's racing weight drop from 1,400 to 1,325 kg (3,086 to 2,921 lb). Due to the complex Group A regulations, this also allowed the racing cars to run bigger wheels and tyres without any drop in power. Indeed, the VK Commodore SS Group A was one of the fastest cars in the world of Group A racing when it hit the tracks in 1986.

HDT Special Vehicles also offered a more powerful version of the engine enlarged to 5.6 L; 344.4 cu in (5,643 cc) in some of its VL models between 1986 and 1988, including the controversial Calais Director. This engine, making as much as 231 kW (310 hp), was an expensive option, particularly once Holden severed ties with HDT in February 1987, which drastically increased the prices of all HDT models, and consequently very few of the 5.6-litre motors were made. Bore and stroke is 102.4 mm × 85.7 mm (4.03 in × 3.37 in).

Fuel injection replaced the carburettors initially on the VL Commodore SS Group A SV, again with Group A touring car racing in mind, this car produced by Holden's new performance vehicle partner Holden Special Vehicles (HSV) in partnership with British-based Tom Walkinshaw Racing (TWR). While Group A disappeared after the VN model range, the fuel injected 5.0-litre; 304.3-cubic-inch (4,987 cc) engine, often referred to by its nickname, The Iron Lion, was offered in Commodores until the VS III Commodore utility in 2000, although there were no longer V8 VS III utilities available for sale during the latter part of 2000.

HSV vehicles featured a variety of more powerful versions of the 5.0-litre, which were also available on regular V8 Holdens as part of the SV Enhanced package. Additionally, from 1994 with the VR series, a 5.7-litre; 349.8-cubic-inch (5,733 cc) "stroker" was standard on the HSV GTS and optional on the HSV Senator, and later on the Statesman/Caprice-based Grange from that its introduction in 1996.

=== 253 / 4.2 L ===
Introduced in the Holden HT alongside the 308 in 1969, later being added LH Torana in 1974 and 1978 for the VB Commodore. The 253 was dropped Torana range in 1978 with the UC Torana, it continued to be used until 1985 for the Holden WB and 1984 for the VH Commodore

Year(s)	Model	Power	Torque
1969–1970	Holden HT	138 kW (185 hp) at 4400rpm	262 lb⋅ft (355 N⋅m) at 2400 rpm
1970–1971	Holden HG	138 kW (185 hp) at 4400rpm	262 lb⋅ft (355 N⋅m) at 2400 rpm
1971-1974	Holden HQ	138 kW (185 hp) at 4400rpm	262 lb⋅ft (355 N⋅m) at 2400 rpm
1974–1976	Holden LH Torana	138 kW (185 hp) at 4400rpm	262 lb⋅ft (355 N⋅m) at 2400 rpm
1974–1976	Holden HJ	138 kW (185 hp) at 4400rpm	262 lb⋅ft (355 N⋅m) at 2400 rpm
1976–1978	Holden LX Torana	138 kW (185 hp); 83 kW (111 hp)	262 lb⋅ft (355 N⋅m) at 2400 rpm
1976–1977	Holden HX	120 kW (160 hp) at 4550rpm	240 lb⋅ft (325 N⋅m) at 2600 rpm
1977–1980	Holden HZ	120 kW (160 hp) at 4550rpm	240 lb⋅ft (325 N⋅m) at 2600 rpm
1980–1985	Holden WB	100 kW (130 hp) at 4200rpm (single exhaust); 115 kW (154 hp) at 4400rpm (dual exhaust)	269 lb⋅ft (365 N⋅m) at 2000 rpm (single exhaust); 289 lb⋅ft (392 N⋅m) at 3200 rpm (dual exhaust)
1978–1980	Holden VB Commodore	87 kW (117 hp) at 4000rpm	271 N⋅m (200 lb⋅ft) at 2000 rpm
1980–1981	Holden VC Commodore	100 kW (130 hp) at 4200rpm (single exhaust); 115 kW (154 hp) at 4400rpm (dual exhaust)	269 N⋅m (198 lb⋅ft) at 2000 rpm (single exhaust); 289 N⋅m (213 lb⋅ft) at 3200 rpm (dual exhaust)
1981–1984	Holden VH Commodore	100 kW (130 hp) at 4200rpm (single exhaust); 115 kW (154 hp) at 4400rpm (dual exhaust)	269 N⋅m (198 lb⋅ft) at 2000 rpm (single exhaust); 289 N⋅m (213 lb⋅ft) at 3200 rpm (dual exhaust)

=== 304 / 5.0 L ===
Introduced in 1985, in the VK Commodore for Peter Brock's HDT Special Vehicles, created to slip underneath the 5,000 cc (305 cu in) engine capacity cut-off in Group A touring car regulations, allowing Commodore competitors to run at a lower competition weight. Discontinued in December 2000 with the release of the VU Ute for Coupé utilities and June 1999 for the rest of the line with the release of the VT II Commodore and WH Caprice.

Year(s)	Model	Power	Torque
1985–1986	Holden VK Commodore	?	?
1986–1988	Holden VL Commodore	122 kW (164 hp) at 4400rpm	323 N⋅m (238 lb⋅ft) at 3200 rpm
1988–1991	Holden VN Commodore	165 kW (221 hp) at 4400rpm	385 N⋅m (284 lb⋅ft) at 3600 rpm
1990–1994	Holden VQ Caprice	165 kW (221 hp) at 4400rpm	385 N⋅m (284 lb⋅ft) at 3600 rpm
1991–1993	Holden VP Commodore	165 kW (221 hp) at 4400rpm	385 N⋅m (284 lb⋅ft) at 3600 rpm
1993–1995	VR Commodore	165 kW (221 hp) at 4800rpm	385 N⋅m (284 lb⋅ft) at 3600 rpm
1995–1997	Holden VS Commodore	165 kW (221 hp) at 4400rpm (series I); 168 kW (225 hp) at 4400rpm (series II); 179 kW (240 hp) at 4400rpm (series III)	385 N⋅m (284 lb⋅ft) at 3600 rpm (series I); 395 N⋅m (291 lb⋅ft) at 3600 rpm (series II); 400 N⋅m (295 lb⋅ft) at 3600 rpm (series III)
1997–1999	Holden VT Commodore	179 kW (240 hp) at 4400rpm	400 N⋅m (295 lb⋅ft) at 3600 rpm

=== 308 / 5.0 L ===
Year(s)	Model	Power	Torque
1969–1971	Holden HT	179 kW (240 hp) at 4000rpm	315 lb⋅ft (427 N⋅m) at 3000 rpm
1970–1971	Holden HG	179 kW (240 hp) at 4000rpm	315 lb⋅ft (427 N⋅m) at 3000 rpm
1971-1974	Holden HQ	179 kW (240 hp) at 4800rpm	315 lb⋅ft (427 N⋅m) at 3000 rpm
1974–1976	Holden LH Torana	179 kW (240 hp) at 4800rpm	315 lb⋅ft (427 N⋅m) at 2400 rpm
1974–1976	Holden HJ	179 kW (240 hp) at 4800rpm	315 lb⋅ft (427 N⋅m) at 3000 rpm
1976–1978	Holden LX Torana	179 kW (240 hp) at 4800rpm 126 kW (169 hp)	315 lb⋅ft (427 N⋅m) at 3400 rpm
1976–1977	Holden HX	161 kW (216 hp) at 4800rpm	295 lb⋅ft (400 N⋅m) at 3100 rpm
1977–1980	Holden HZ	161 kW (216 hp) at 4800rpm	295 lb⋅ft (400 N⋅m) at 3100 rpm
1980–1985	WB Statesman	126 kW (169 hp) at 4400rpm	361 lb⋅ft (489 N⋅m) at 2800 rpm
1978–1980	Holden VB Commodore	114 kW (153 hp) at 4000rpm	344 N⋅m (254 lb⋅ft) at 2200 rpm
1980–1981	Holden VC Commodore	126 kW (169 hp) at 4200rpm	325 N⋅m (240 lb⋅ft) at 2600 rpm
1981–1984	Holden VH Commodore	126 kW (169 hp) at 4200rpm	361 N⋅m (266 lb⋅ft) at 2800 rpm
1984–1986	Holden VK Commodore	126 kW (169 hp) at 4200rpm 177 kW (237 hp) at 4800rpm	361 N⋅m (266 lb⋅ft) at 2800 rpm 419 N⋅m (309 lb⋅ft)

=== 344 ===
Year(s)	Model	Power	Torque
1987	HDT VL Director	231 kW (310 hp) at 5400rpm	536 N⋅m (395 lb⋅ft) at 3200 rpm
1987	HDT VL Aero	225 kW (302 hp) at 4400rpm	536 N⋅m (395 lb⋅ft) at 3200 rpm
1987	HDT VL Bathurst	225 kW (302 hp)	?

=== 350 / Harrop Stroker ===
HSV vehicles featured a variety of more powerful versions of the 5.0-litre, which were also available on regular V8 Holdens as part of the SV Enhanced package. Additionally, from 1994 with the VR series, a 5.7-litre; 349.8-cubic-inch (5,733 cc) "stroker" was standard on the HSV GTS and optional on the HSV Senator, and later on the Statesman/Caprice-based Grange from its introduction in 1996.

Year(s)	Model	Power	Torque
1994–1995	HSV VR GTS / Senator 215i	215 kW (288 hp) at 4800rpm	475 N⋅m (350 lb⋅ft) at 3600 rpm
1995–1999	HSV VS GTS / GTS-R / Senator 215i / Grange 215i	215 kW (288 hp) at 4800rpm	475 N⋅m (350 lb⋅ft) at 3600 rpm
1997–1999	HSV VT GTS / Senator 220i	220 kW (300 hp) at 4800rpm	475 N⋅m (350 lb⋅ft) at 3600 rpm

== See also ==
- Holden straight-six motor
