= Holden Sandman =

Australian sports utility from Holden

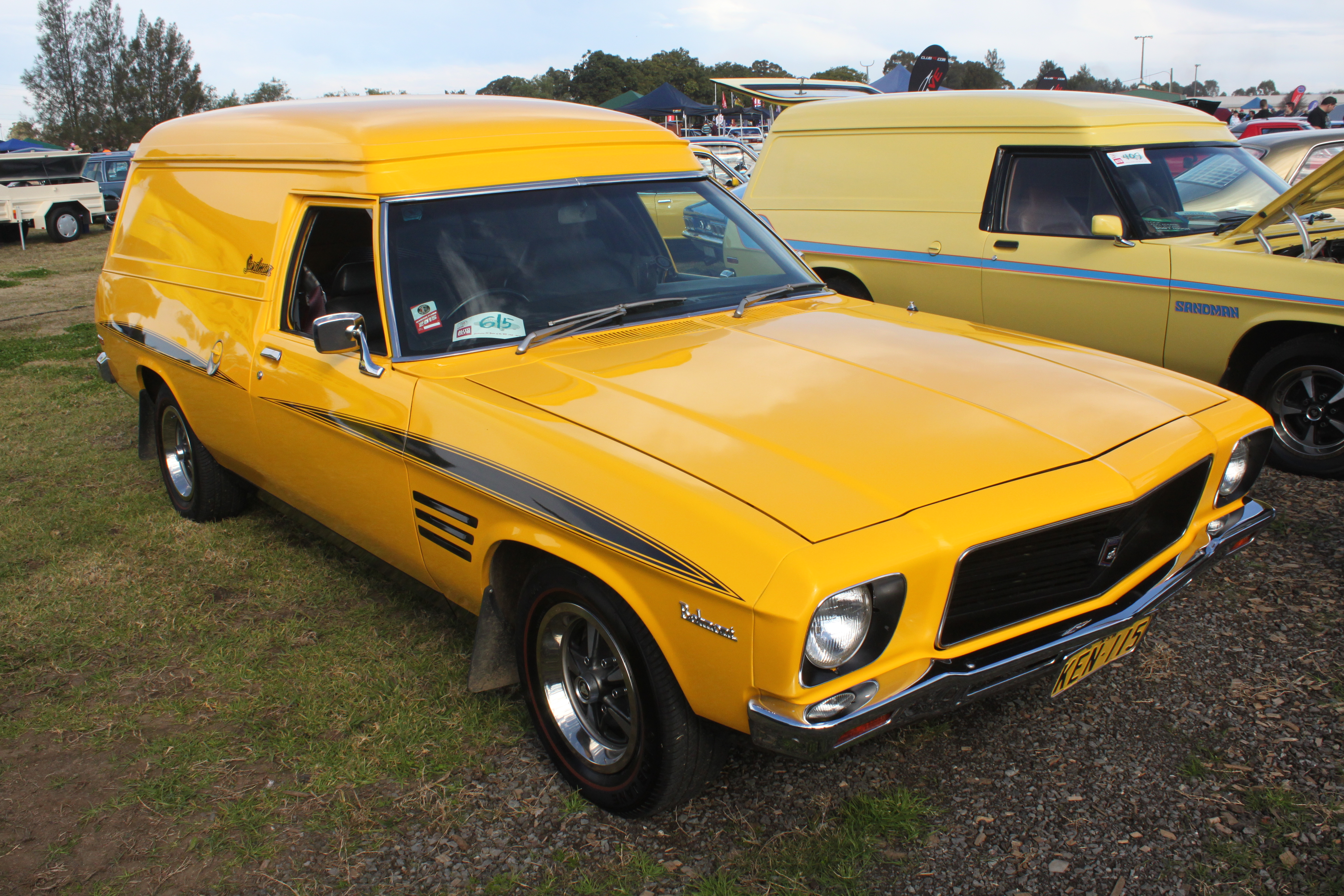
- 1974 Holden HQ Sandman panel van

Overview
- Manufacturer: Holden (General Motors)
- Production: 1974–1980
- Assembly: Adelaide, South Australia (Elizabeth); Brisbane, Queensland (Holden Acacia Ridge Plant)

Body and chassis
- Class: Full-size
- Body style: 2-door coupé utility; 2-door panel van
- Layout: Front-engine, rear-wheel-drive

Powertrain
- Engine: 2.8 L GMH '173' I6; 3.3 L GMH '202' I6; 4.2 L GMH '253' V8; 5.0 L GMH '308' V8
- Transmission: 3-speed Holden Tri-Matic automatic 4-speed manual

Chronology
- Successor: Holden Ute (VU) SS (sport utility); Holden Commodore Sandman (nameplate)

The Holden Sandman is a sports coupé utility and panel van produced by Holden from 1974 to 1980.

The Sandman featured elements from the Monaro GTS, including gauge cluster, steering wheel, bucket seats, and a fully furnished interior, vinyl stripes, and wheels. The guards featured a "Sandman" logo painted on B pillars, and Sandman written on the tailgate. It utilised a 4-speed manual transmission or an optional 3-speed 'Tri-Matic' automatic, both controlled through a console mounted gear stick.

The HQ and HJ Sandman models were available with the following engines: GMH '173' I6 at 118 bhp (88 kW), GMH '202' I6 at 135 bhp (101 kW), GMH '253' V8 at 185 bhp (138 kW), GMH '308' V8 at 240 bhp (179 kW).

It was released in the following series: HQ (1974), HJ (1974-76), HX (1976-77), HZ (1977)

== Sandman concept ==
At the 2000 Sydney Motor Show Holden unveiled a Sandman Ute concept based on the Holden Ute (VU). The interior and exterior was designed by Mambo Graphics.

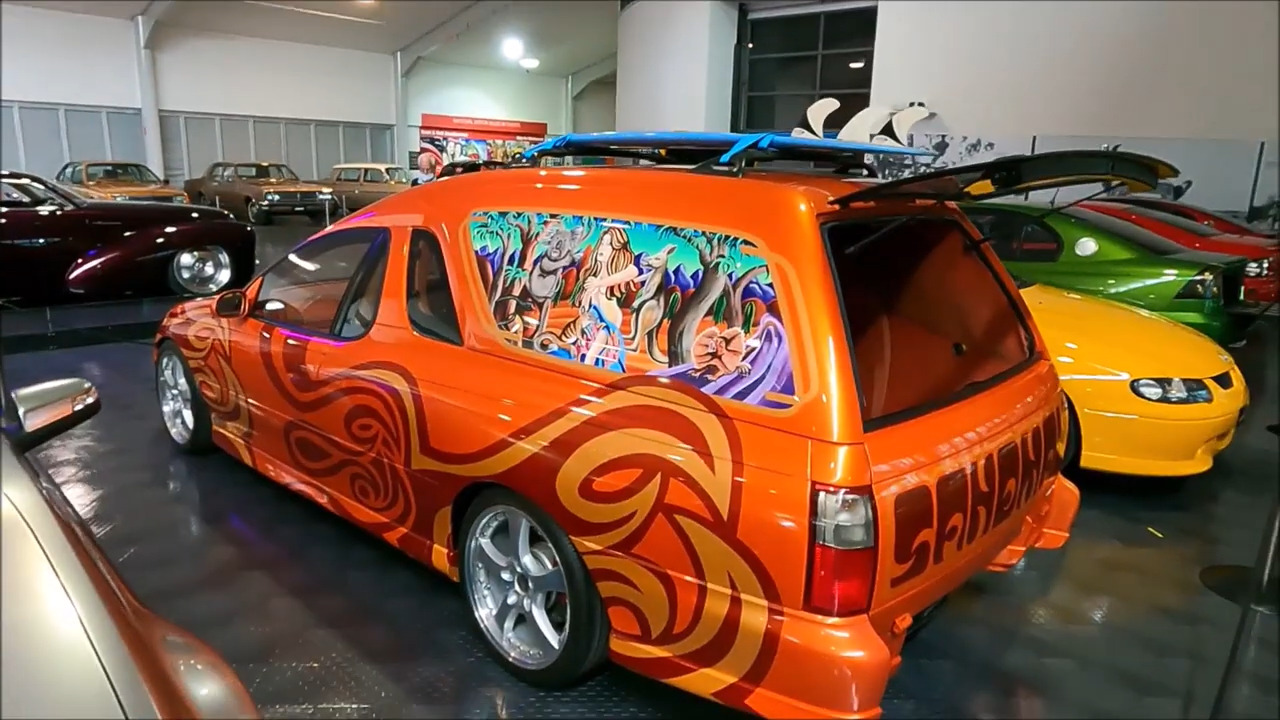
Sandman concept exterior

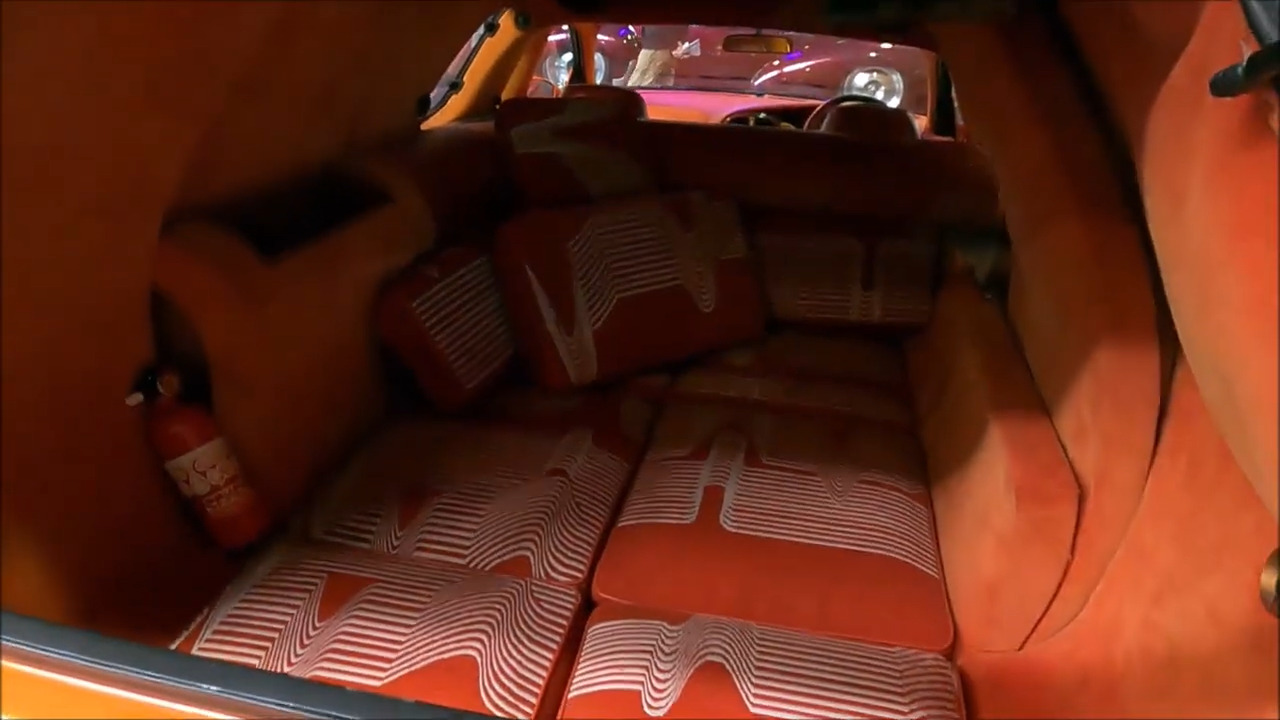
Sandman concept interior

== Holden Commodore Sandman ==
The Sandman nameplate was revived in 2015 for a limited edition of the Holden Commodore (VF) SportWagon and Ute. It was available in SV6 and SS V Redline specifications. It featured 20-inch wheels, Sandman decals, and optional orange sheep skin seat inserts and shag carpet cargo rug in the SportWagon.

== Reception ==
It competed with the Ford Sundowner, Surferoo and Chrysler Drifter. It was popular among surfers.

=== Legacy ===
A postage stamp of the sandman released. A 1974 HQ Sandman panel van featured in Forza Horizon 3.
