= Holden HX =

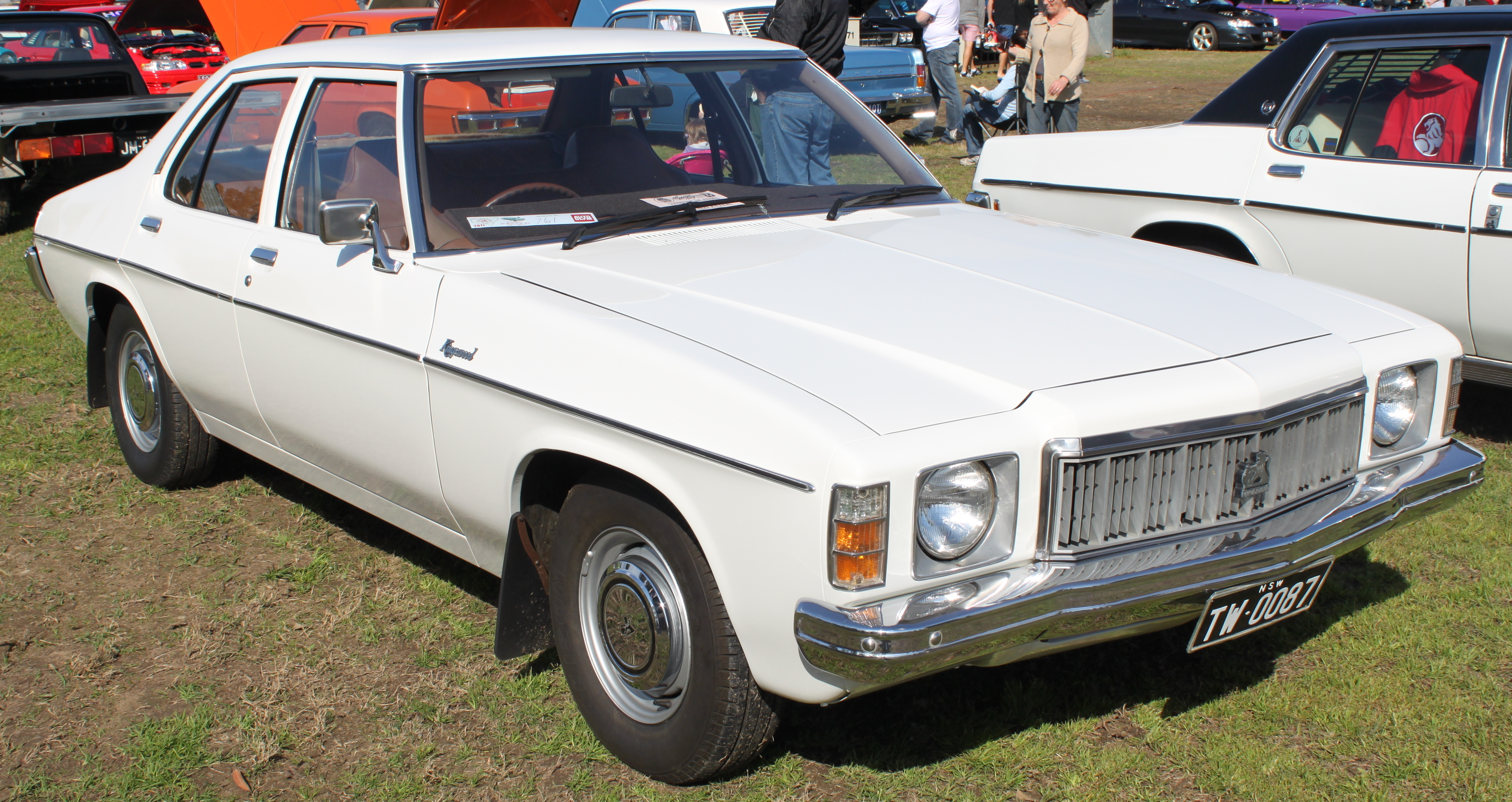
- Holden Kingswood Sedan

Overview
- Manufacturer: Holden
- Production: July 1976 – October 1977
- Assembly: Dandenong; Elizabeth; Pagewood; Trenham

Body and chassis
- Class: Full-size
- Body style: 4-door sedan 4-door station wagon 2-door coupe 2-door coupe utility 2-door panel van 2-door chassis cab
- Related: Statesman HX

Powertrain
- Engine: I6: 3.3 L 88 kW (118 hp) Red; V8: 4.2 L 120 kW (161 hp) Red; 5.0 L 161 kW (216 hp) Red
- Transmission: 4-speed manual 3-speed automatic: Tri-Matic; Turbo-Hydramatic 400

Dimensions
- Wheelbase: 2,819 mm (111.0 in) (sedan); 2,896 mm (114.0 in) (wagon)

Chronology
- Predecessor: Holden HJ
- Successor: Holden HZ

The Holden HX is a range of automobiles which was manufactured by Holden in Australia from July 1976 until October 1977.

== Changes ==
The HX series was released in July 1976 and featured a range of models developed from those in the superseded Holden HJ range, which had been in production since 1974. The HX models featured only minor updates to the exterior, notably the grille and badgework. However significant changes were made to the engines to meet new Australian emissions regulations. During the course of the HX series, front bucket seats were adopted as standard equipment for Kingswood-badged vehicles.

== Model range ==
The mainstream passenger car range consisted of 4-door sedan and 5-door wagon body styles in three trim levels.

- Belmont Sedan
- Kingswood Sedan
- Premier Sedan
- Belmont Wagon
- Kingswood Wagon
- Premier Wagon

The Premier models were differentiated from the cheaper variants by a four headlight frontal treatment. Wagons rode on a wheelbase which was 76 mm (three inches) longer than that of the sedans.

Two special-build HX Kingswood variants emerged later in production. A Kingswood Silver Anniversary model was released in November 1976 to celebrate 50 years of General Motors in Australia and a Kingswood Deluxe sedan and wagon was also introduced during the HX model life in September 1977 with a 4.2-litre V8 as standard.

For the HX series the performance oriented Monaro range was reduced to one model only, the Monaro GTS Sedan. The Monaro LS & GTS coupes were not carried in from the HJ series however a Holden Limited Edition coupe was released in September 1976. This used the Monaro coupe body but not the Monaro name.

The commercial vehicle range included coupe utility, panel van and cab chassis truck models:

- Utility
- Kingswood Utility
- Sandman Utility
- Van
- Kingswood Van
- Sandman Van
- One Tonner

The base models were marketed simply as the Holden Utility and Holden Van and both retained the HJ style grille. The Kingswood Van was an addition to the commercial vehicle range and the One Tonner was a chassis cab vehicle which featured its own unique frontal treatment, carried over from its HJ predecessor.

The Sandman Ute and Van were equipped with various features from the Monaro GTS and featured side stripes and a large 'Sandman' logo on the tailgate.

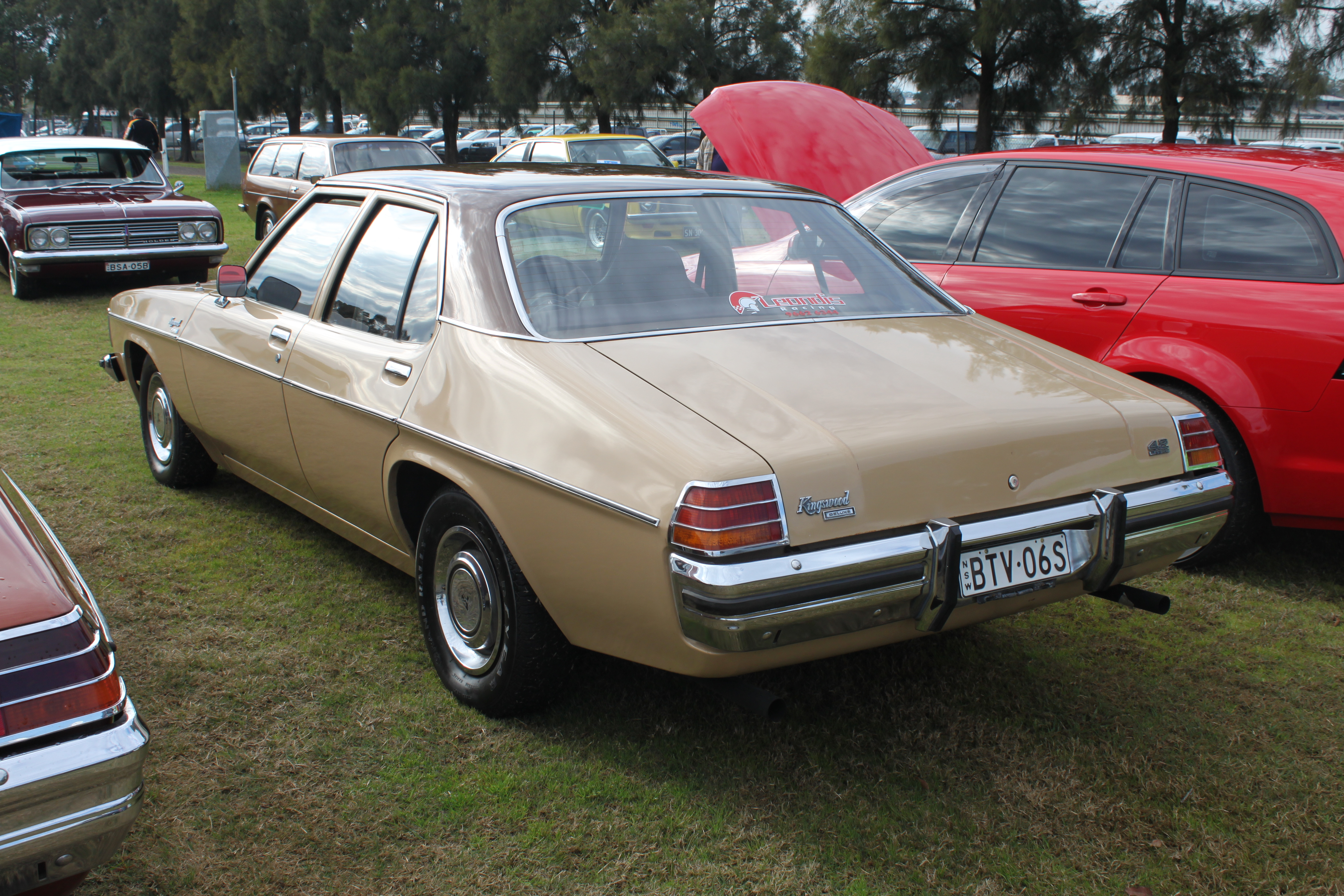
Holden Kingswood sedan

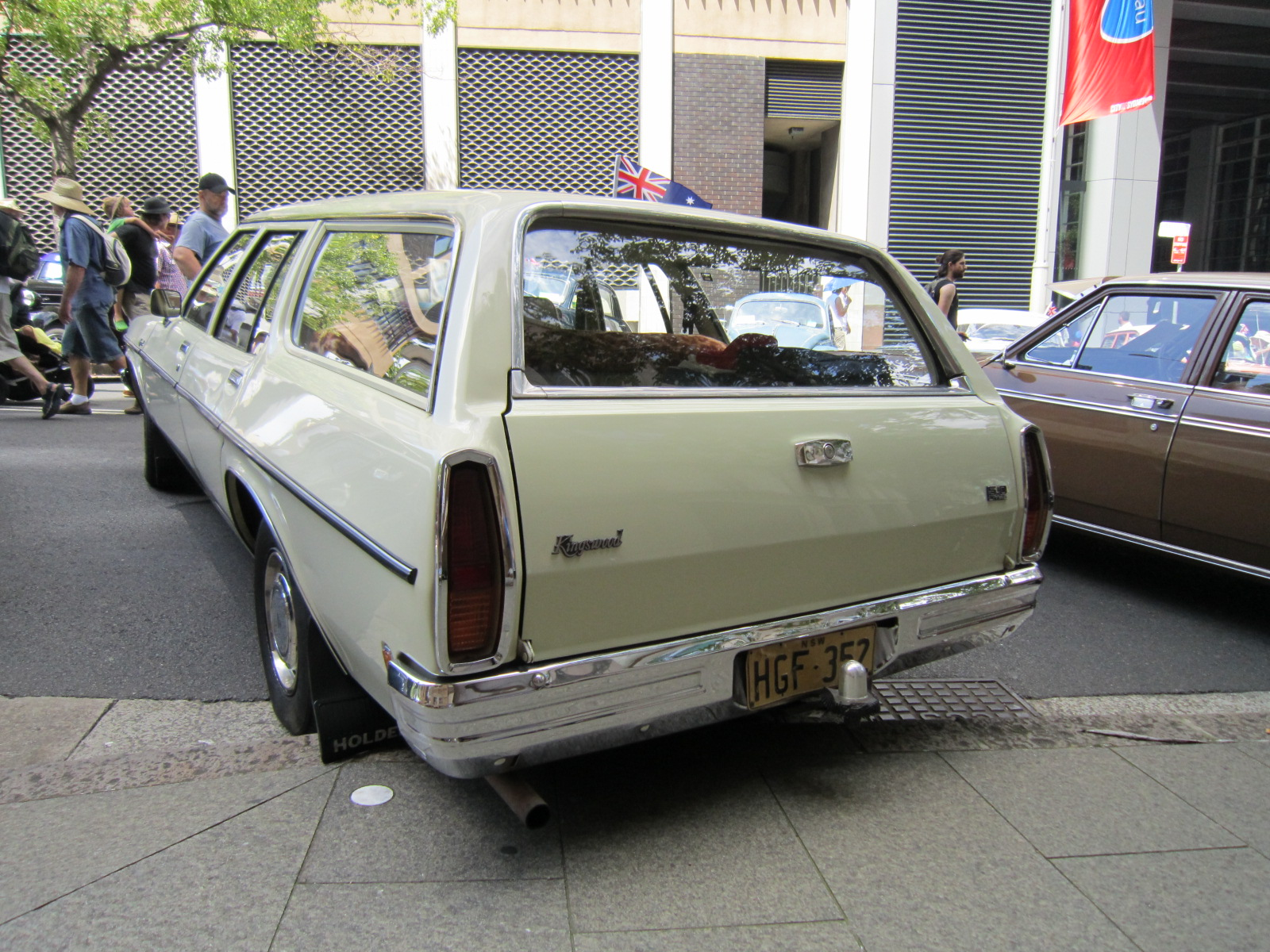
Holden Kingswood wagon

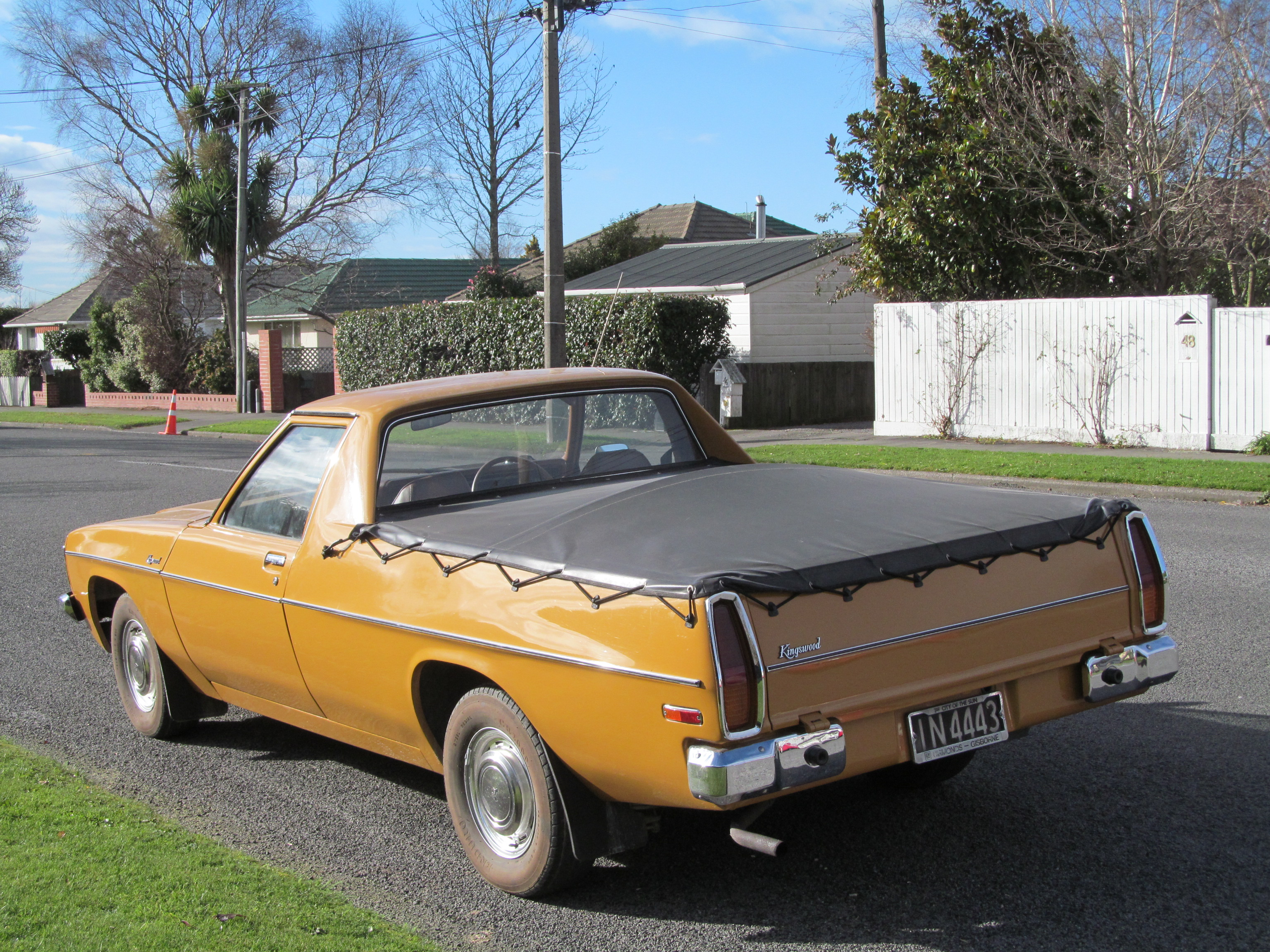
Holden Kingswood utility

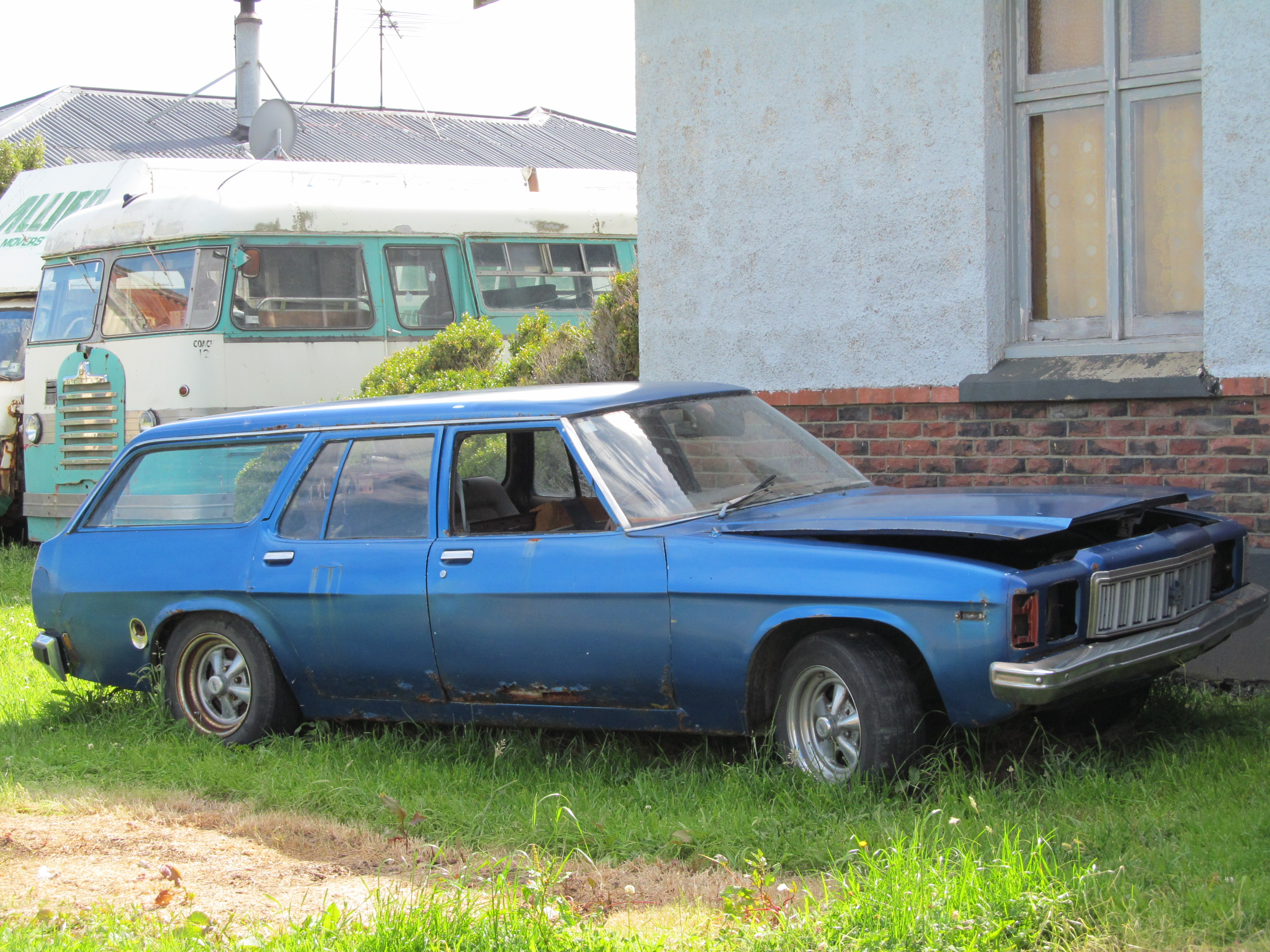
Holden Belmont wagon (with aftermarket wheels)

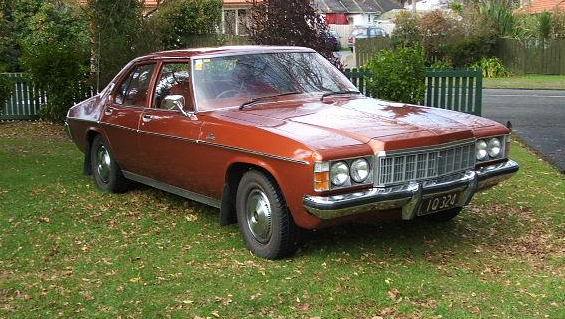
Holden Premier sedan

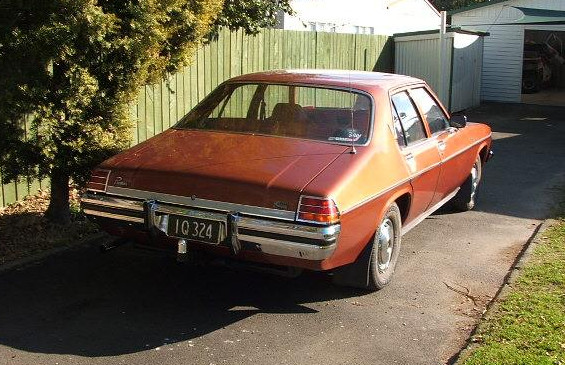
Holden Premier sedan

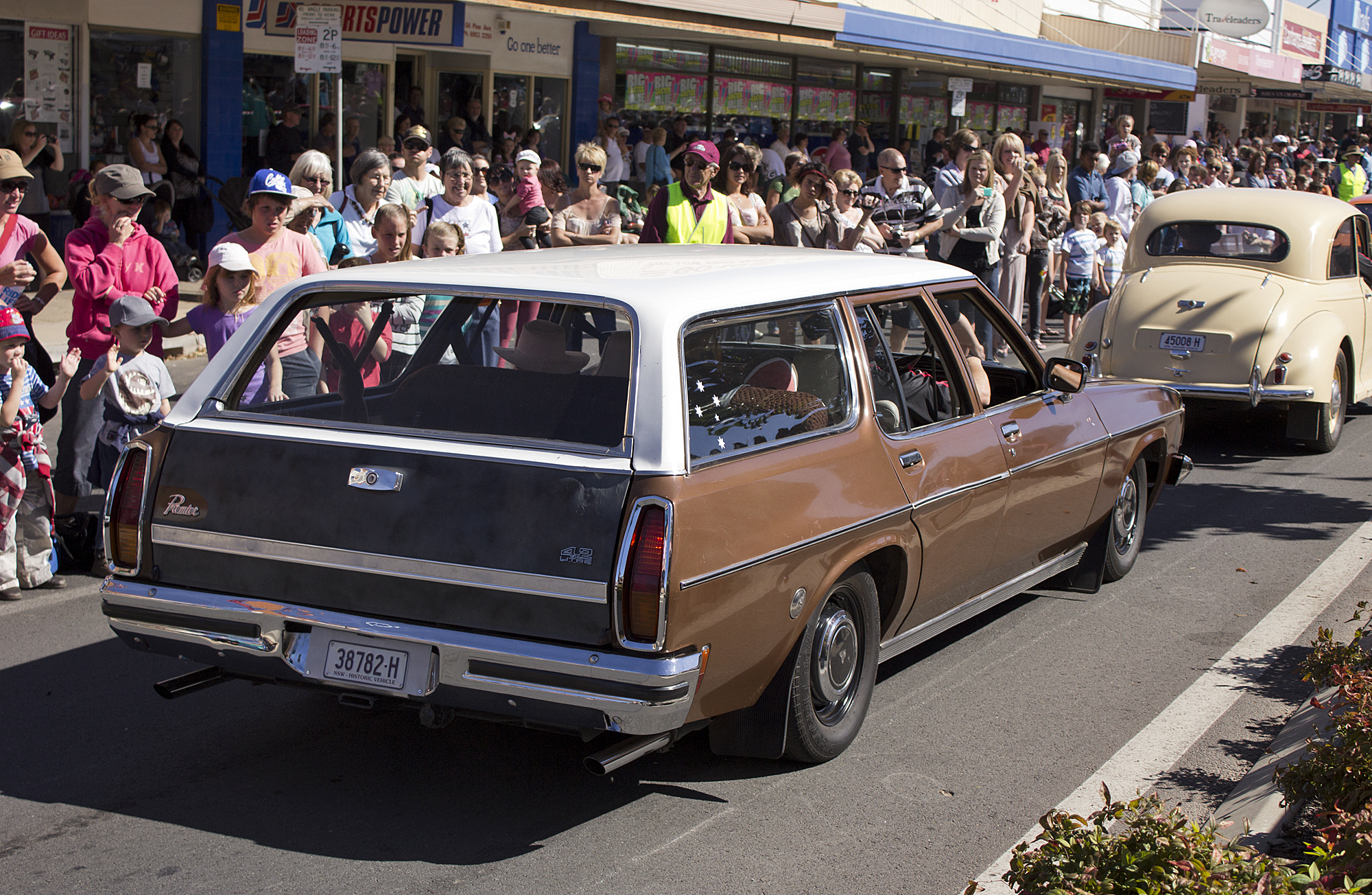
Holden Premier wagon

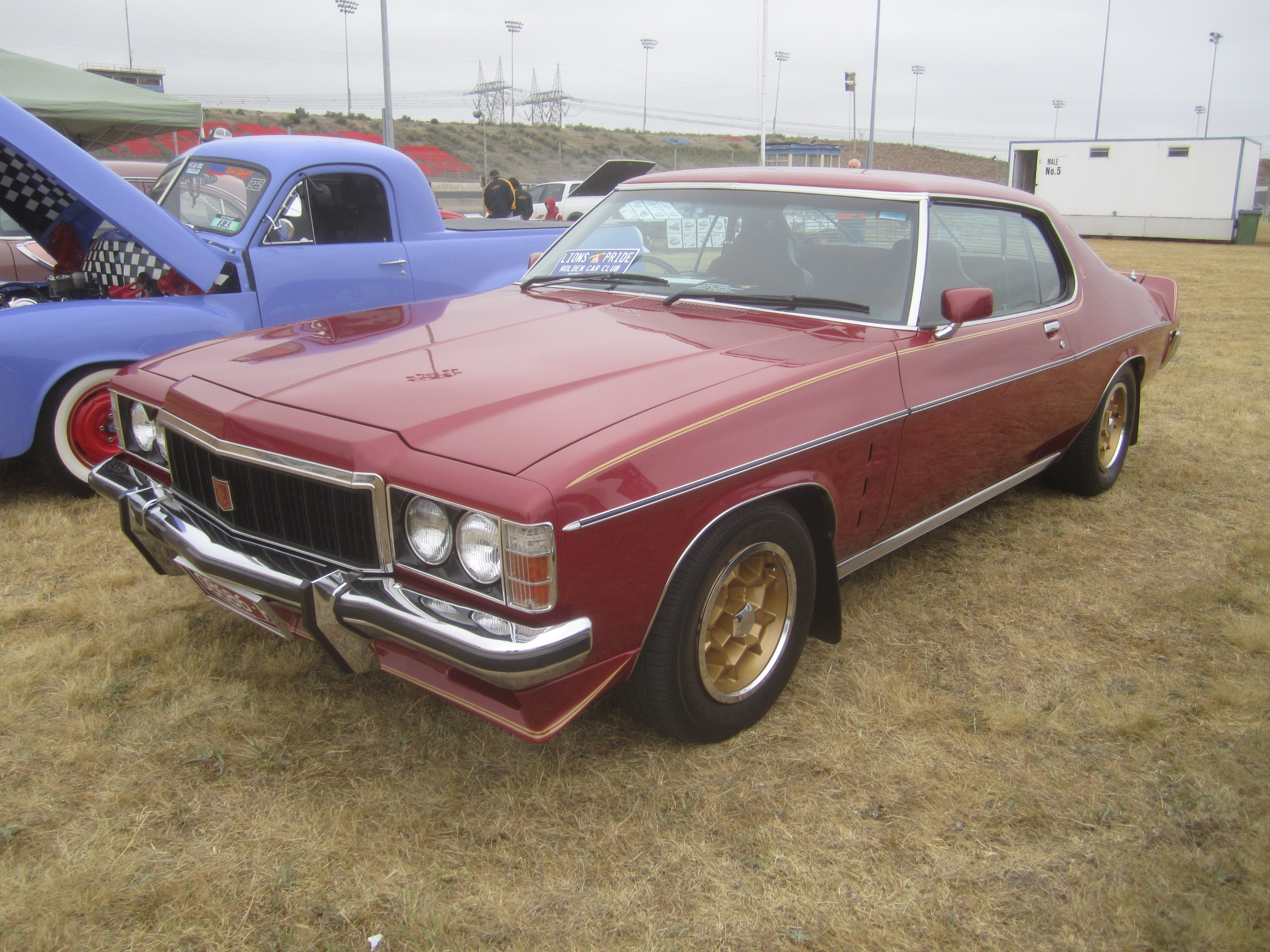
Holden Limited Edition

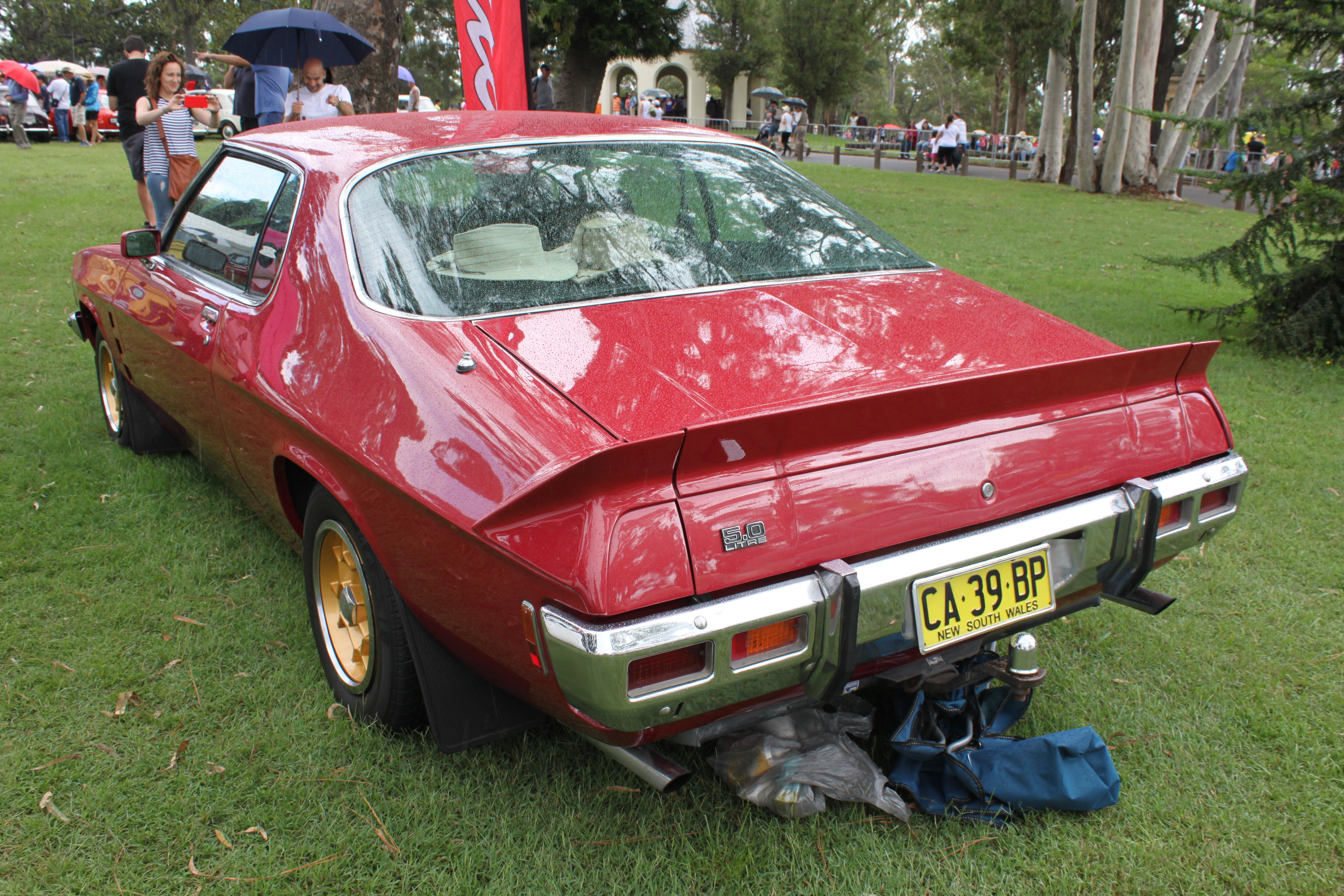
Holden Limited Edition

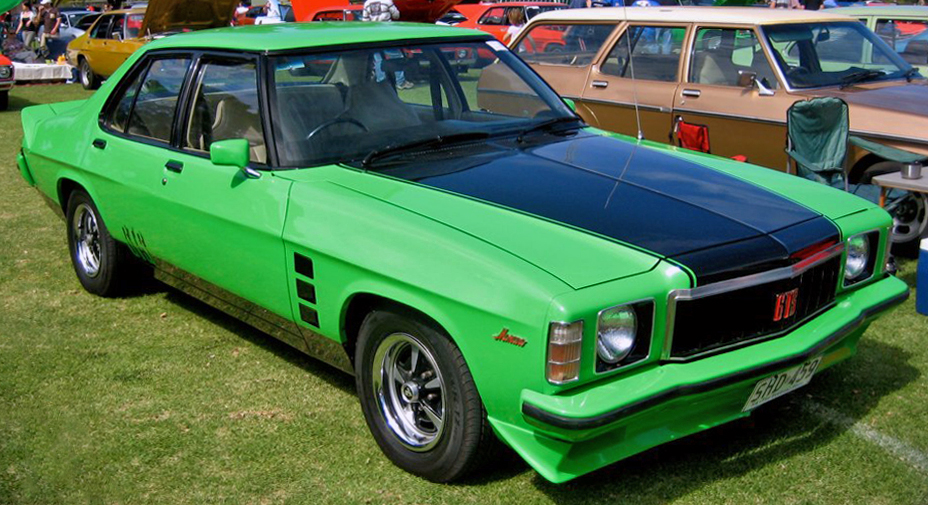
Holden Monaro GTS

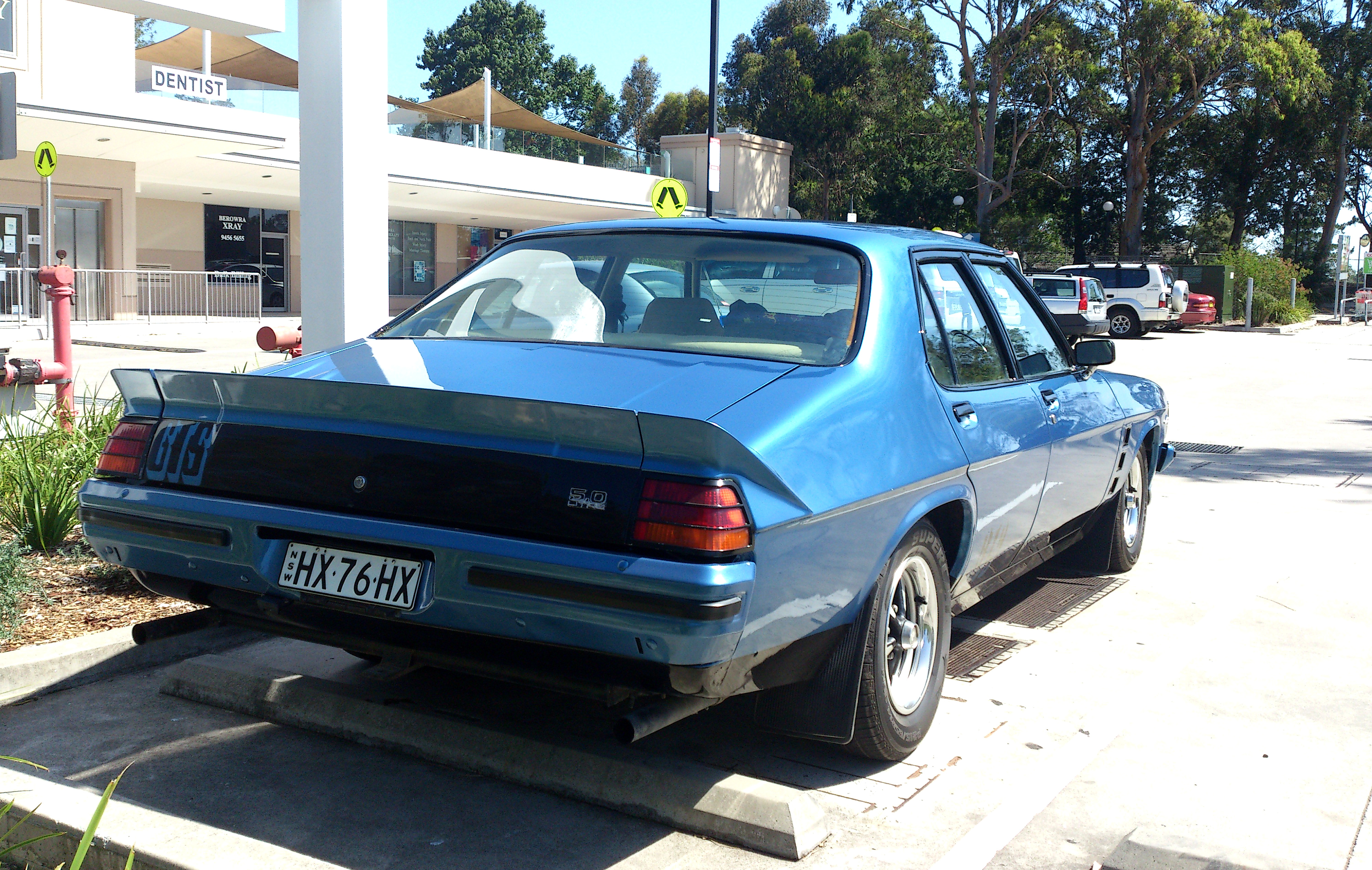
Holden Monaro GTS

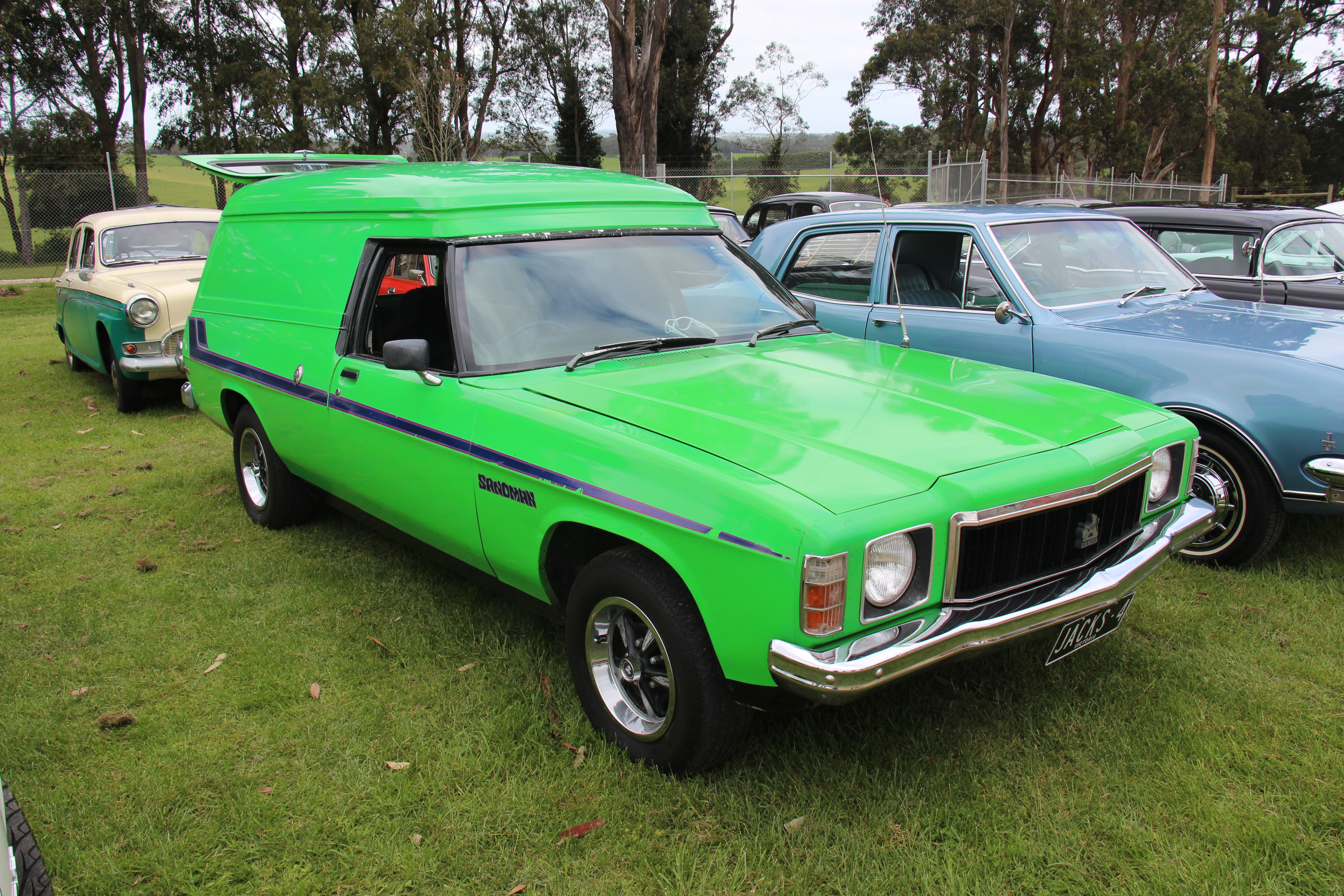
Holden Sandman

== Engines ==
A 3.3-litre inline six-cylinder engine was available, as were 4.2-litre and 5.0-litre V8s. All were modified low-emission units to comply with the new ADR27A regulations, and were notably less powerful than their predecessors. The 2.8-litre inline six available in the HJ series had been deleted, and the Monaro GTS and Holden Limited Edition models were only offered with the eight-cylinder engines.

== Production ==
The Holden HX was replaced by the Holden HZ series in October 1977, HX production having totalled 110,669 units.

== Statesman HX ==
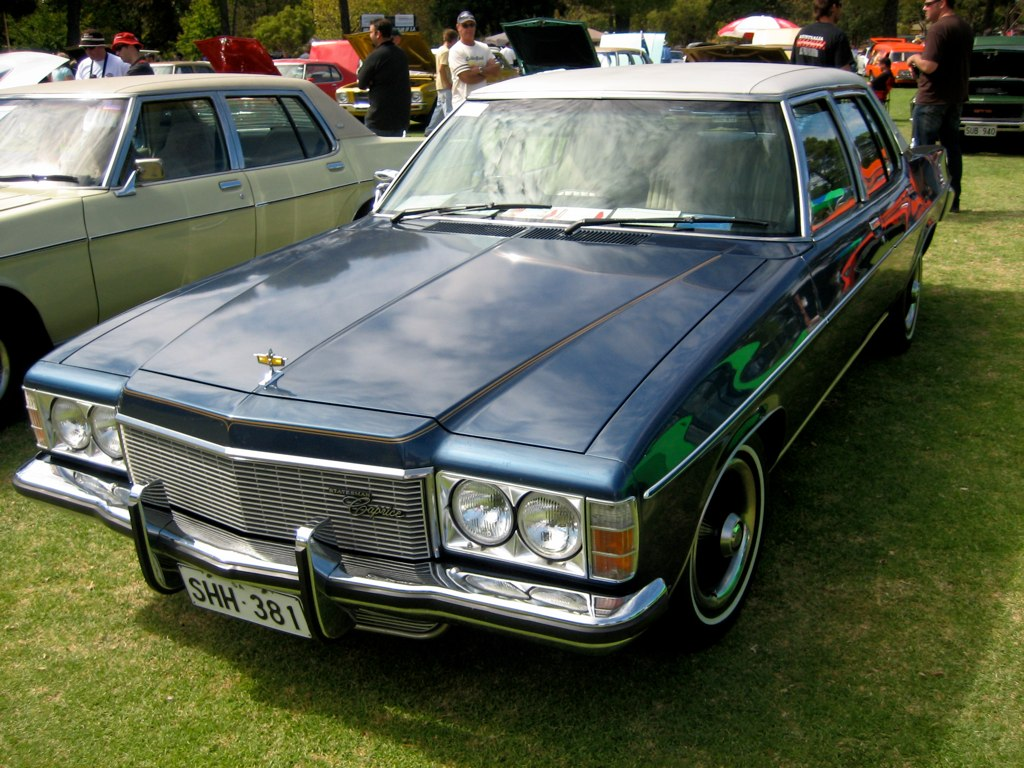
1976–1977 Statesman HX Caprice

The Statesman HX range of long-wheelbase luxury sedans developed from the Holden HX series was also released in July 1976. Like their HJ predecessors, the two models in the Statesman HX range, the de Ville and the Caprice, were marketed as Statesmans rather than as Holdens.
