= Holden HJ =

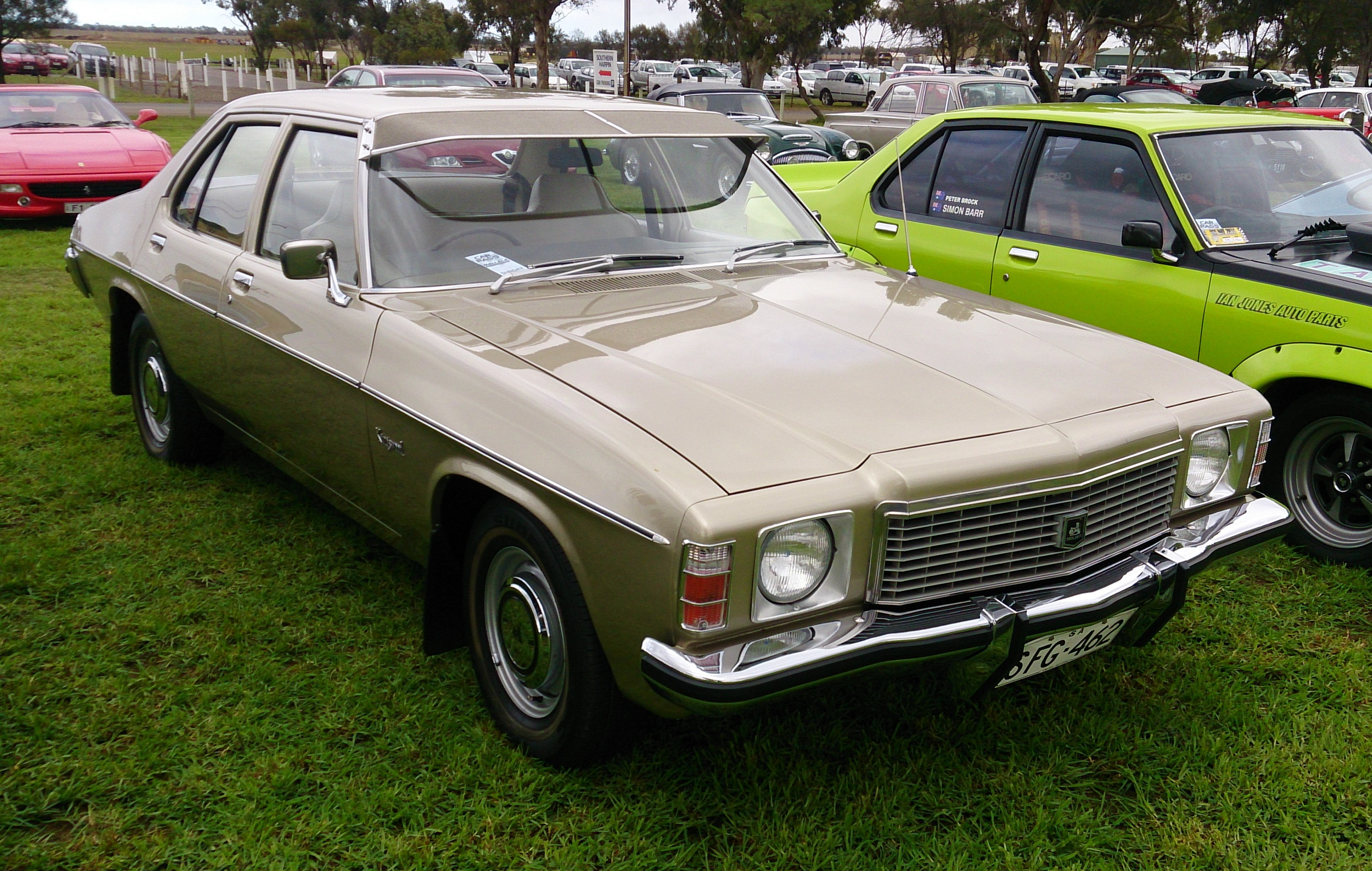
- Holden Kingswood sedan (HJ)

Overview
- Manufacturer: Holden
- Production: October 1974 – July 1976
- Assembly: Dandenong; Elizabeth; Pagewood; Trenham
- Designer: Leo Pruneau and Peter Nankervis under Joe Schemansky

Body and chassis
- Body style: 4-door sedan 5-door wagon 2-door coupé 2-door coupé utility 2-door panel van 2-door cab chassis
- Layout: FR layout

Chronology
- Predecessor: Holden HQ
- Successor: Holden HX

The Holden HJ is a series of automobiles which were produced by Holden in Australia from 1974 to 1976. The HJ series was released on 4 October 1974 and was an improved and facelifted version of the superseded Holden HQ series which had been in production since 1971.

== Model range ==
All HJ models, aside from the One Tonner, were easily identified from the HQ by having a squared-off frontal treatment with wraparound indicator lights. The rear of the sedan models featured a new bumper and wraparound triangular taillights, while all other body styles kept the previous HQ's rear styling. Sedan and wagon also had revised rear quarter panels.

The mainstream passenger car range consisted of 4-door sedan and 5-door wagon models in three trim levels.

- Belmont sedan
- Belmont wagon
- Kingswood sedan
- Kingswood wagon
- Premier sedan
- Premier wagon

The Premier was distinguished from the cheaper models by a four headlight frontal treatment. Wagons rode on a wheelbase which was three inches (76.2 mm) longer than that of the sedans.

The performance-orientated Monaro range included two-door coupe and four-door sedan models:

- Monaro LS coupe
- Monaro GTS coupe
- Monaro GTS sedan

The base model Monaro Coupe was not carried forward from the HQ series, and the new range also saw the demise of the Monaro GTS350 Coupe and Sedan, meaning that the imported Chevrolet 350-cubic-inch (5.7-litre) V8 engine was no longer offered in any Holden model.

Commercial vehicle derivatives included coupe utility, panel van and cab chassis truck models:

- Utility
- Kingswood utility
- Panel van
- One Tonner (cab chassis)

There were two special vehicle packages available based upon various commercial vehicles:

- Sandman (option code XX7 (and XU3 added late 1975)) – available on Holden Utility (until early 1976) and Panel van and on Kingswood utility. XU3 became the original XX7 late 1975 and from then onwards XX7 vehicles used passenger vehicle tyres.
- Ambulance (option code BO6) – available on panel van and cab chassis.

The base utility and panel van models did not carry the Belmont name which had been applied to their HQ series equivalents, and they were marketed simply as the Holden utility and Holden panel van respectively, while The Sandman variants were equipped with various features from the Monaro GTS models.

The cab/chassis model was marketed as the Holden One Tonner, which in base form still used its own unique front treatment introduced with the previous HQ range, and would continue with the model until 1980. If a cab chassis or van was optioned as a BO6 (ambulance) it was fitted with the HJ Premier front and door trims.

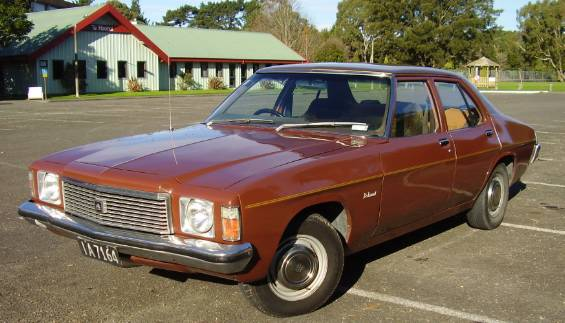
Holden Belmont sedan

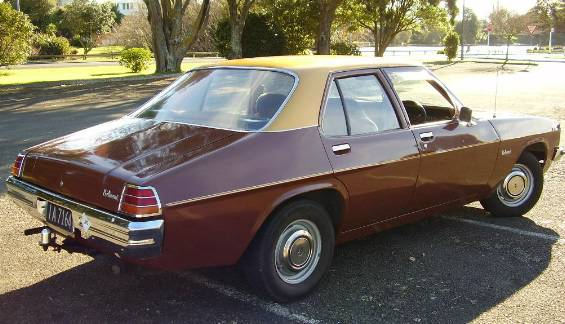
Holden Belmont sedan

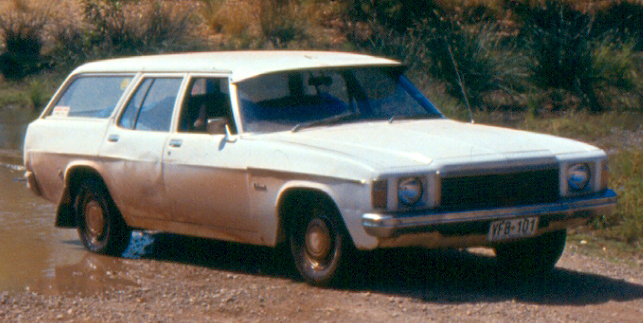
Holden Belmont wagon

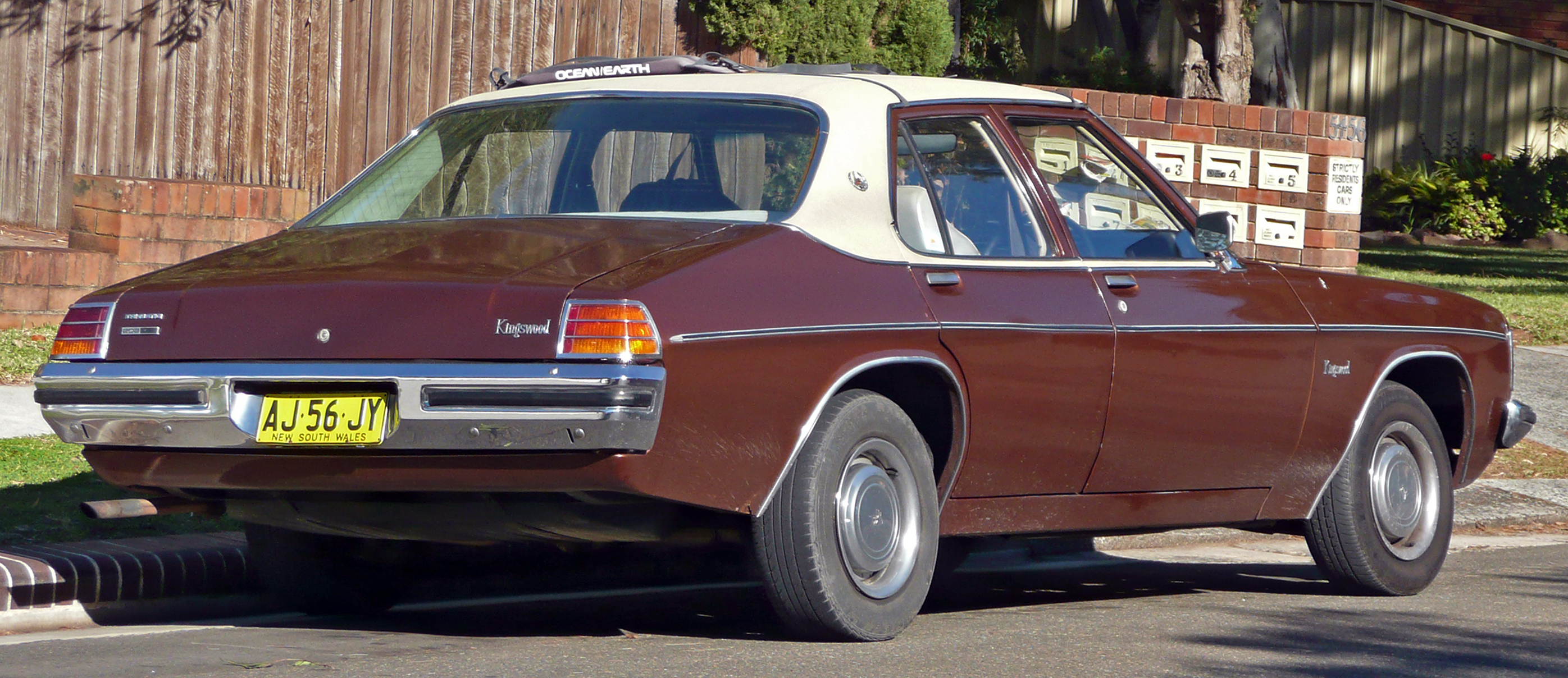
Holden Kingswood sedan

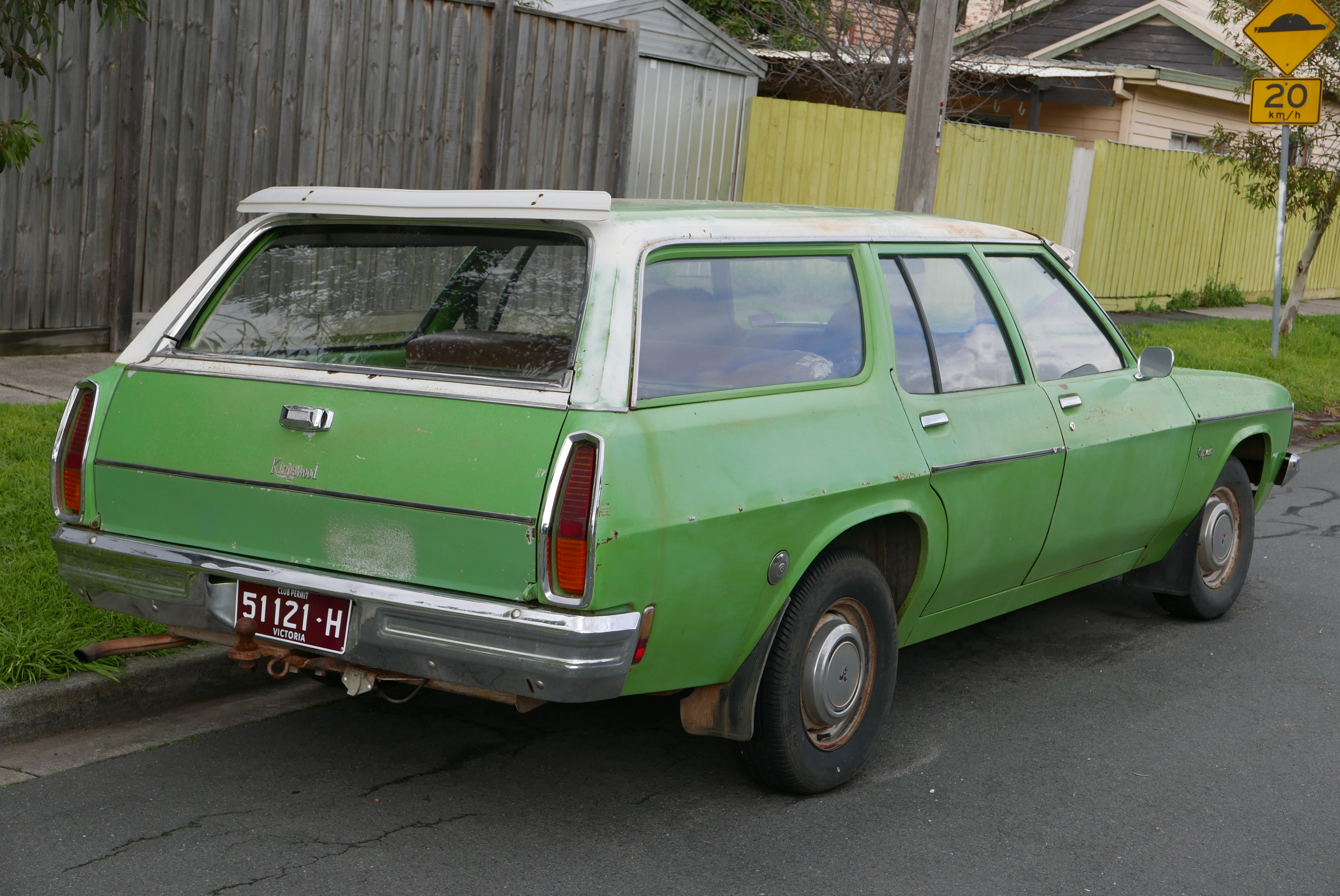
Holden Kingswood wagon

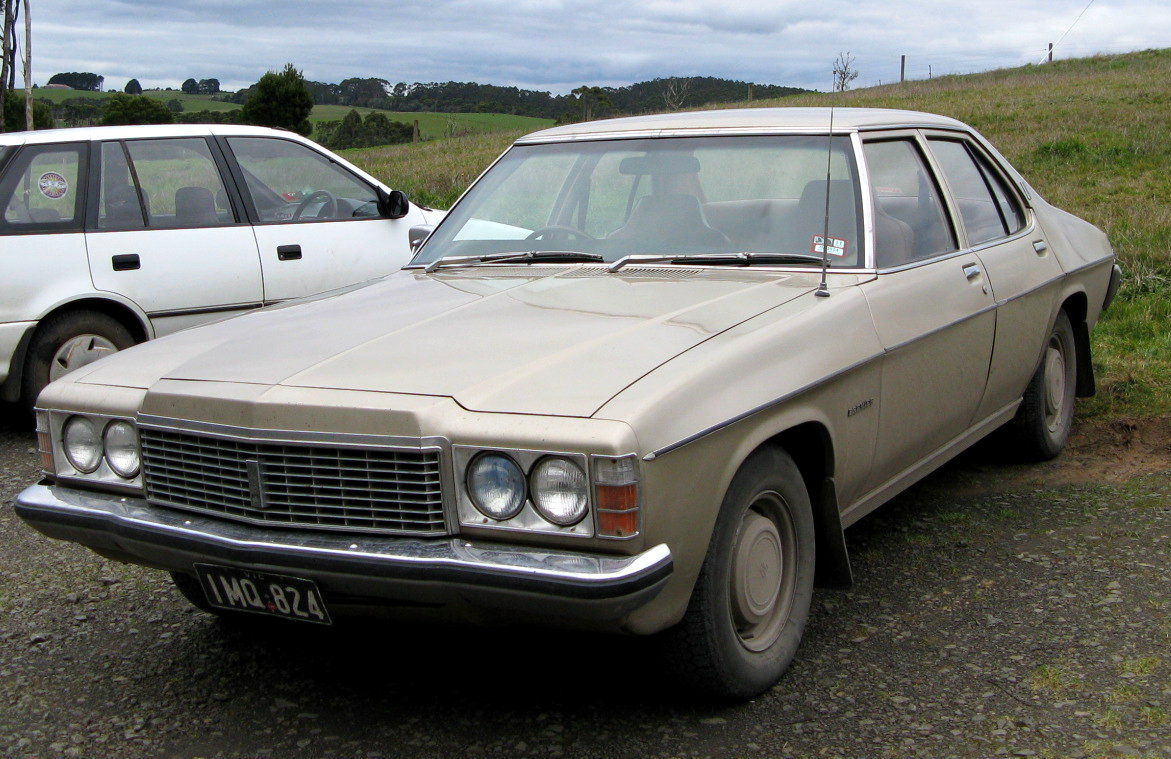
Holden Premier sedan

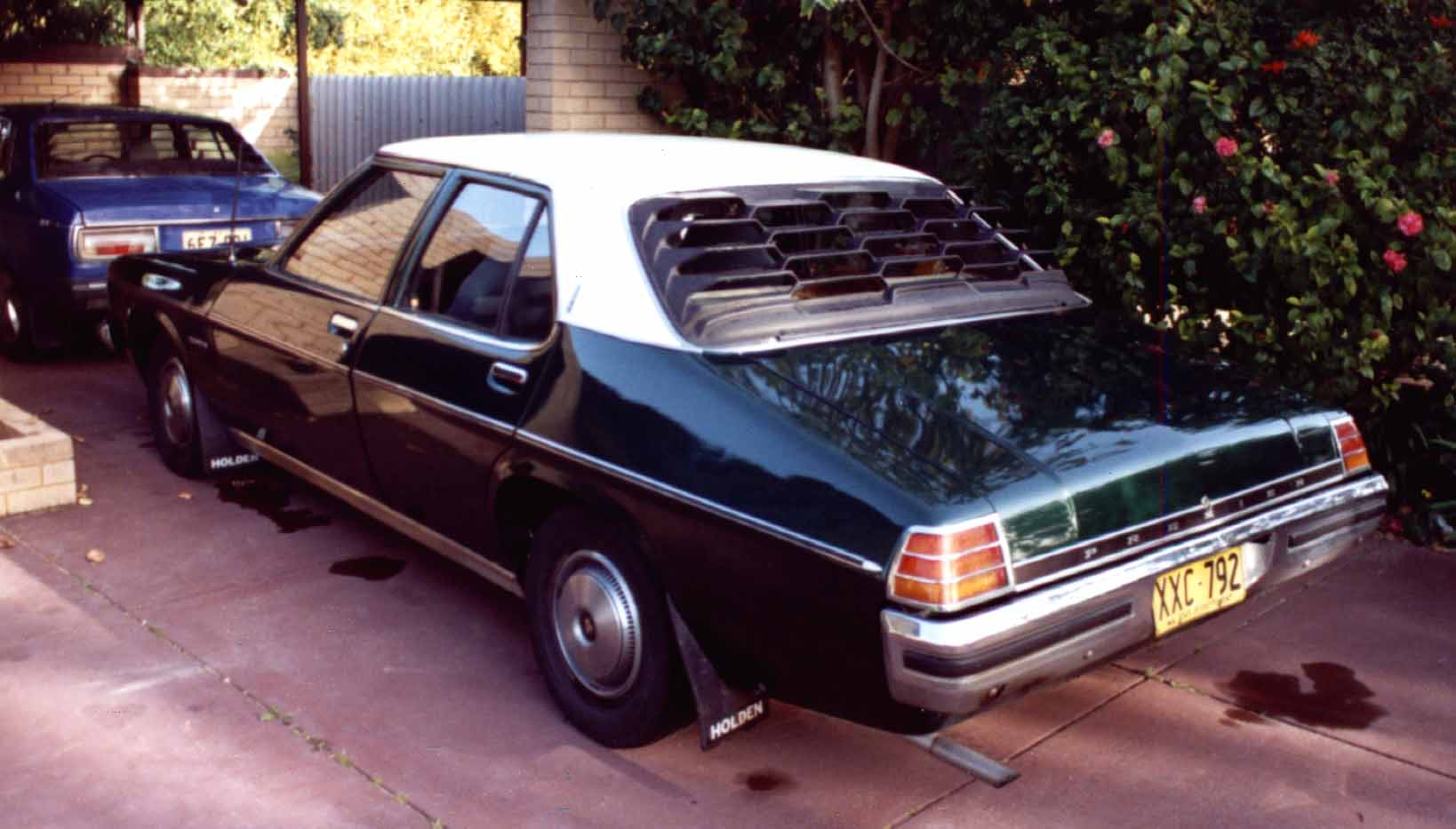
Holden Premier sedan

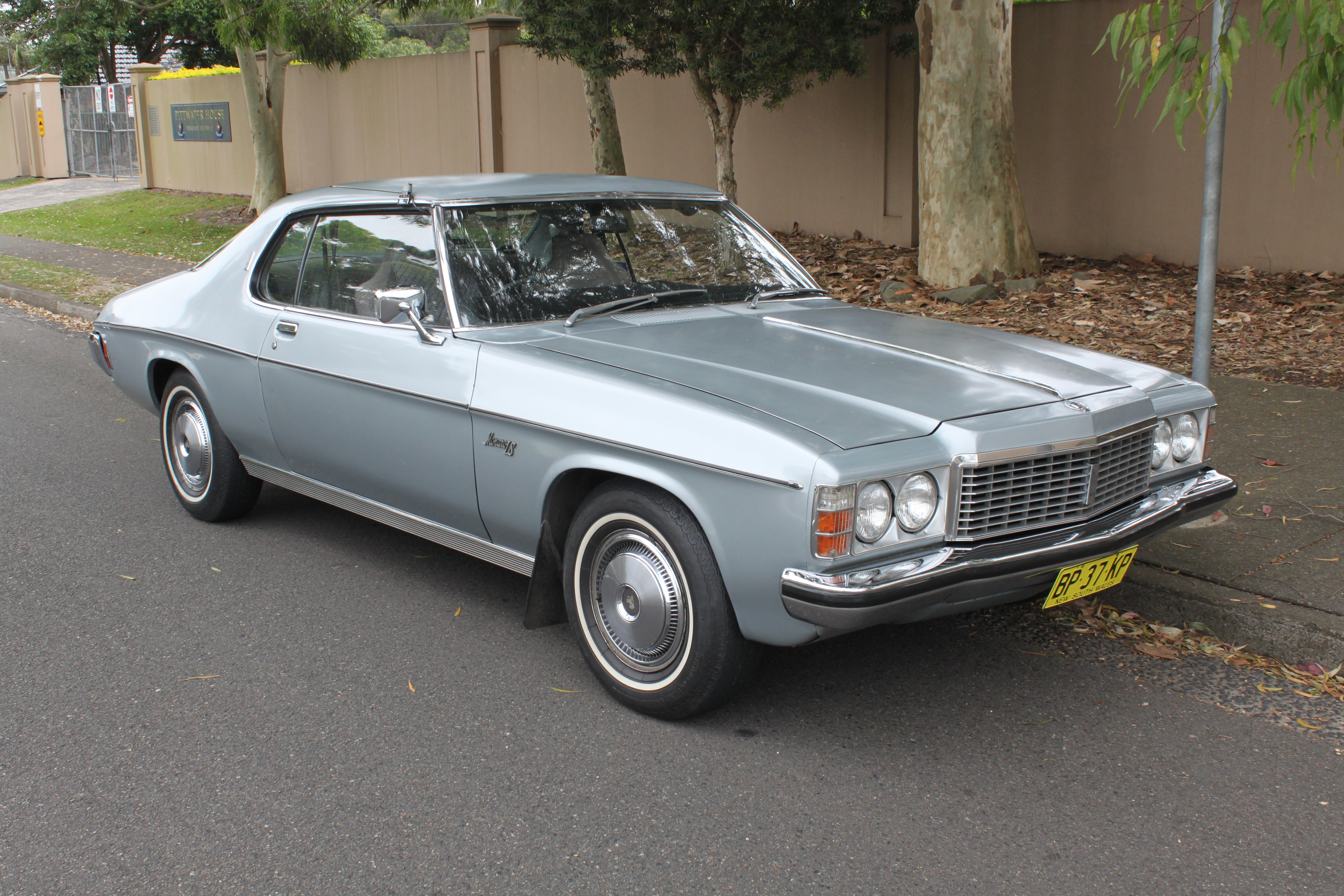
Holden Monaro LS

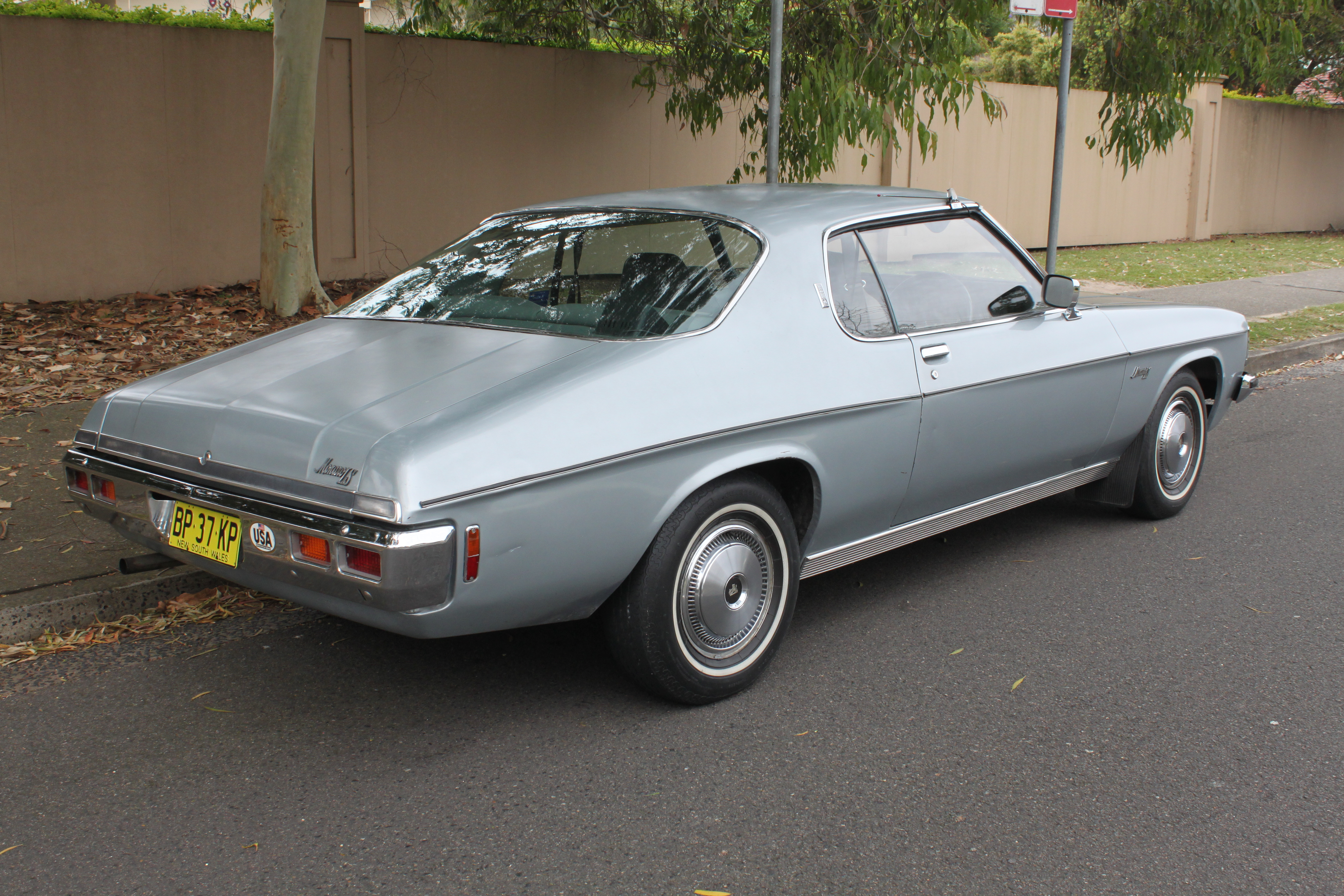
Holden Monaro LS

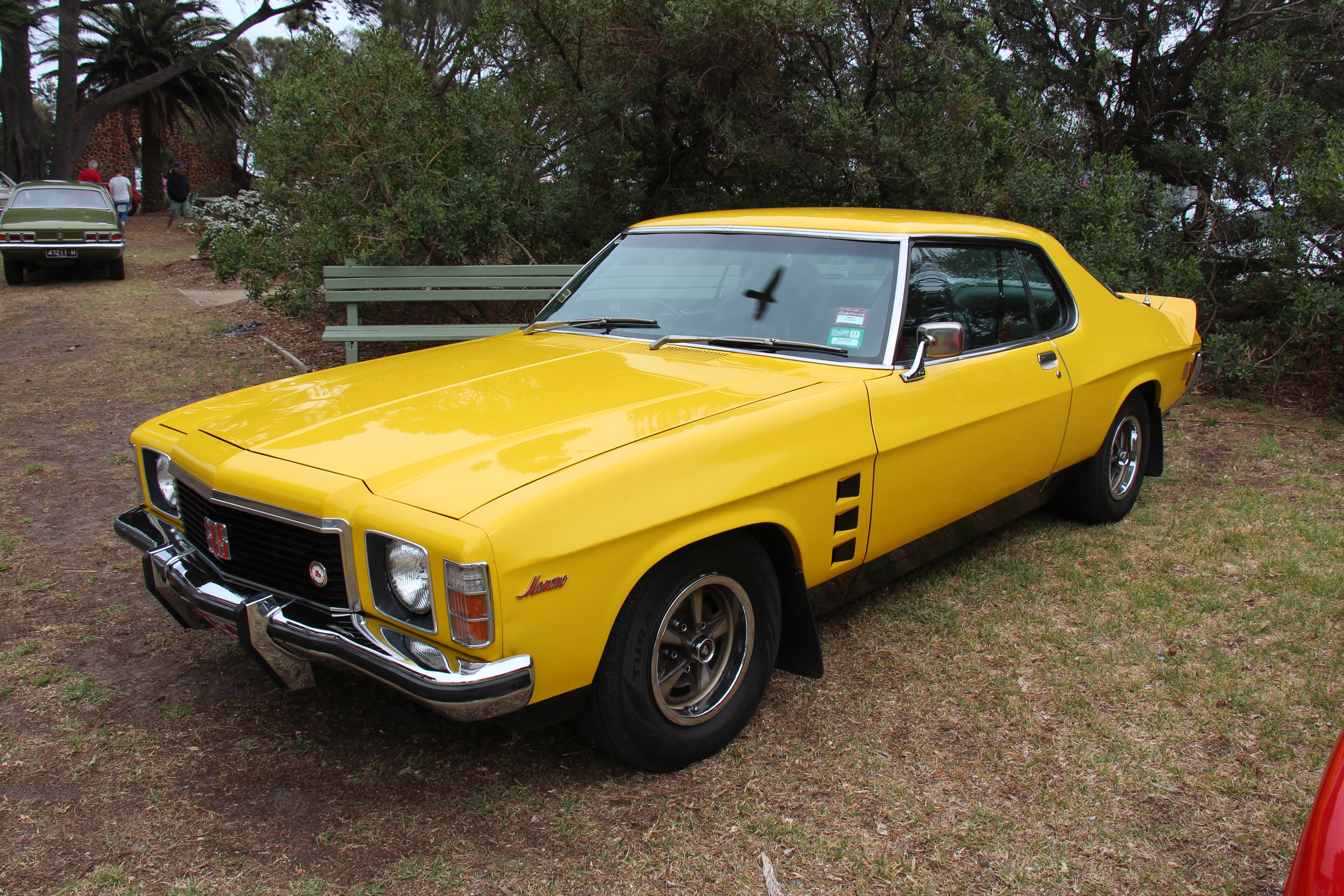
Holden Monaro GTS coupe

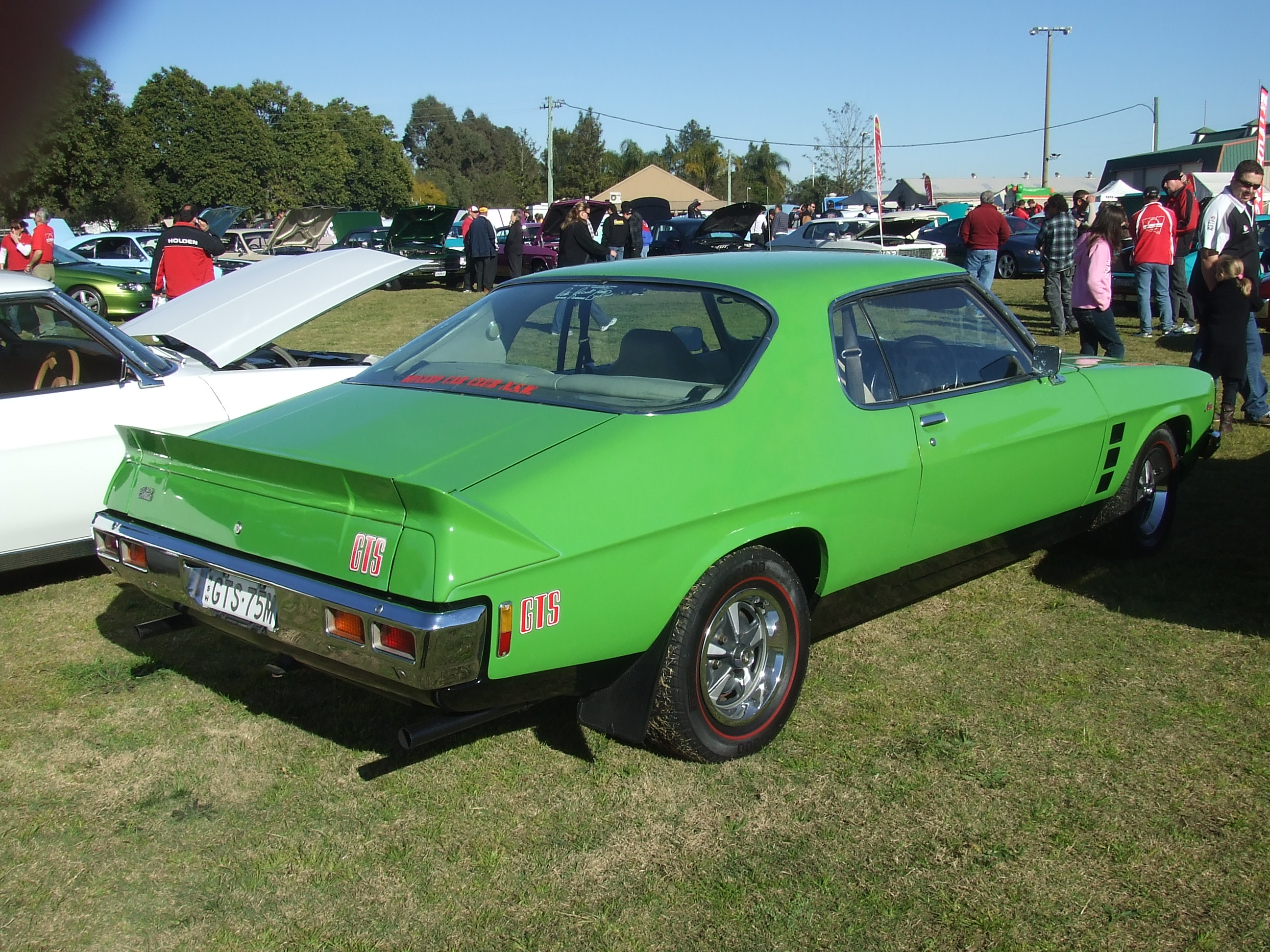
Holden Monaro GTS coupe

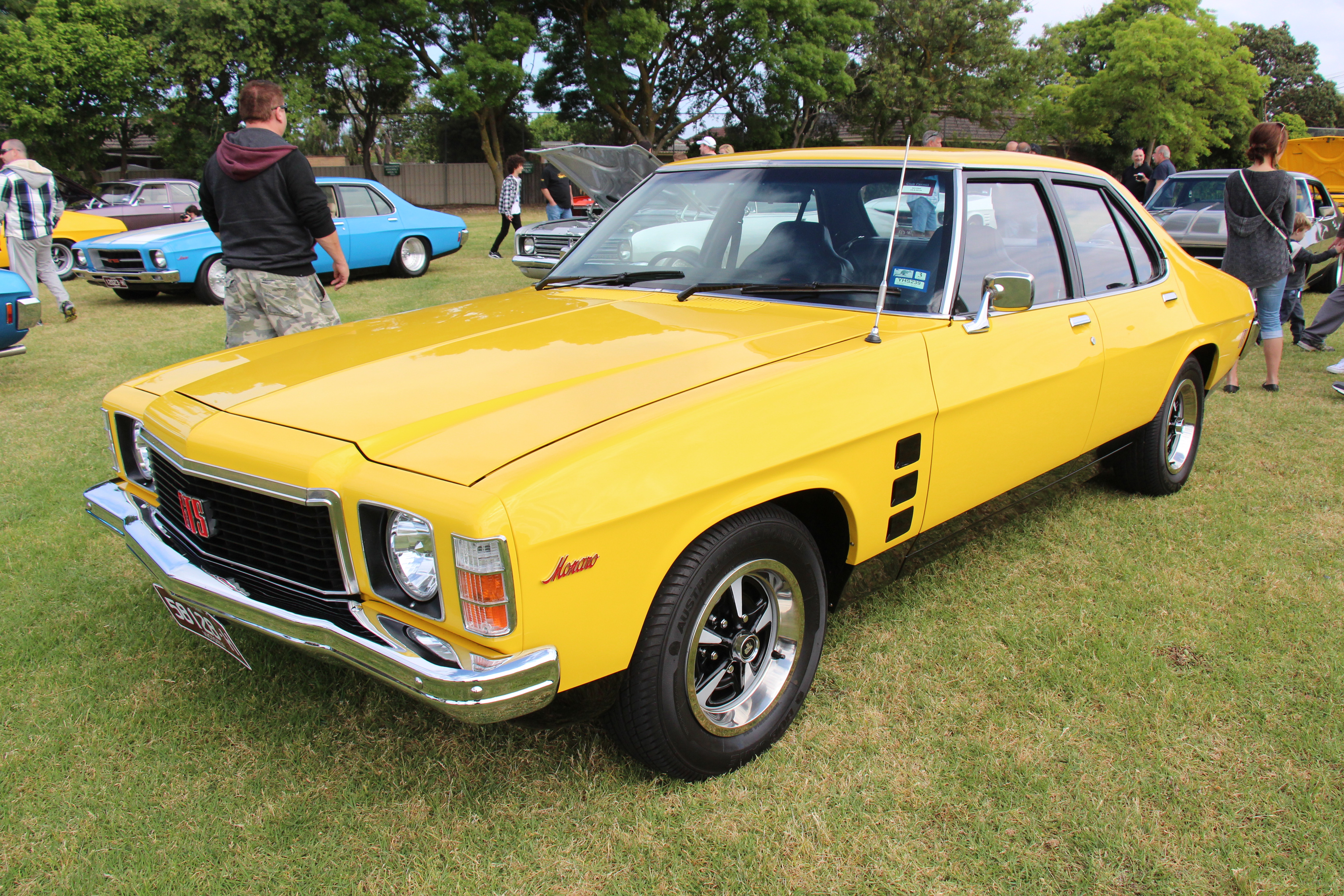
Holden Monaro GTS sedan

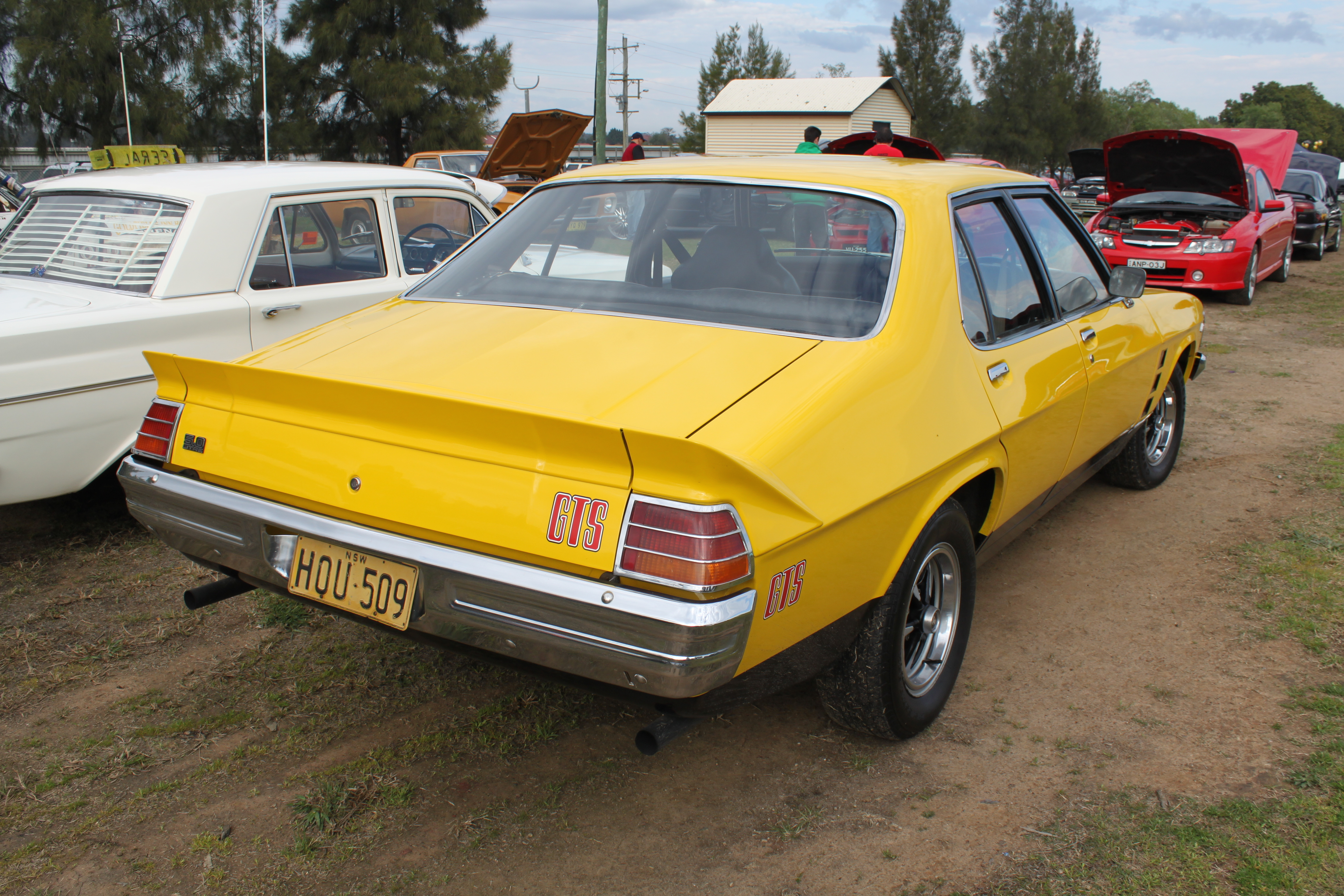
Holden Monaro GTS sedan

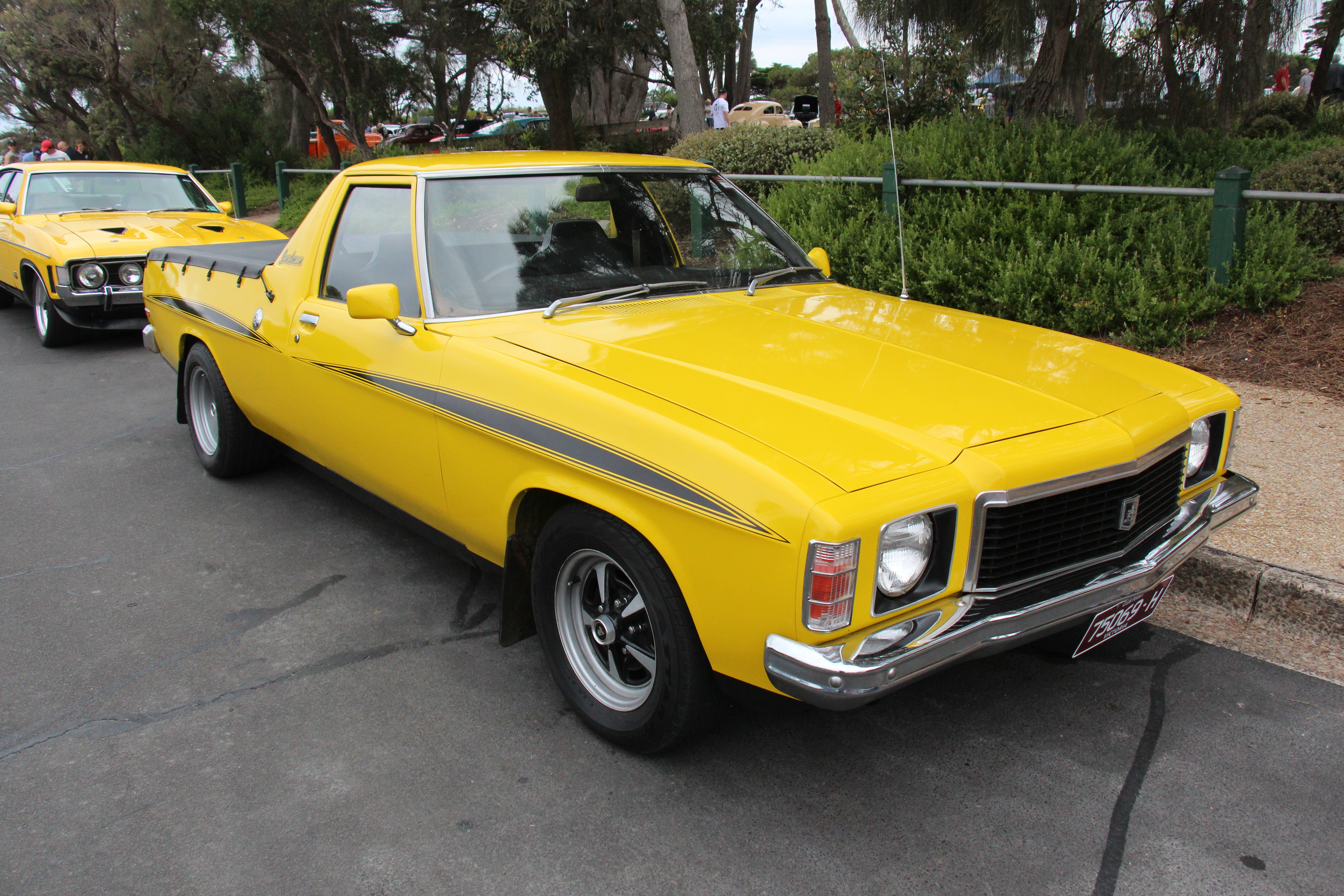
Holden Utility with Sandman option pack

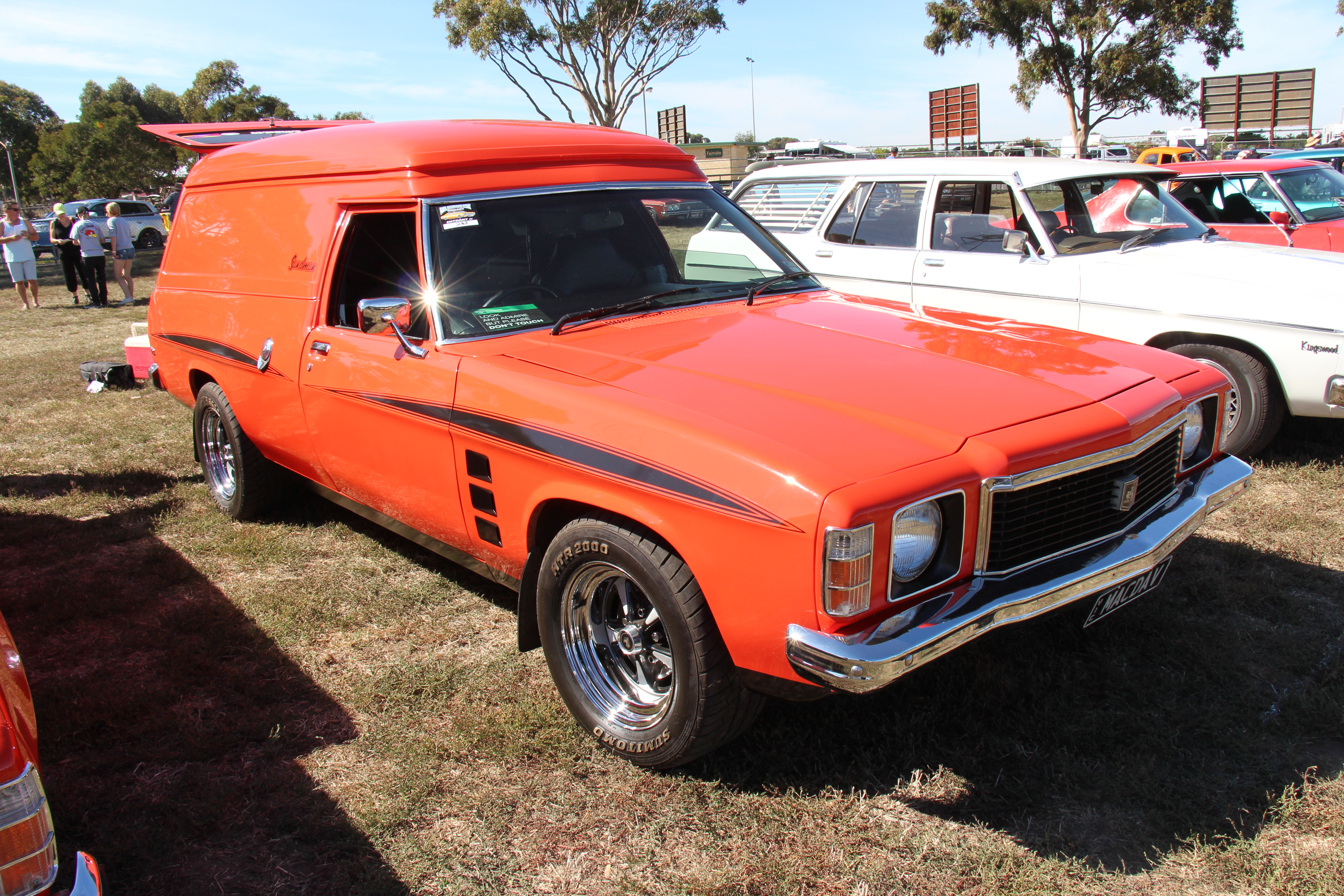
Holden Panel Van with Sandman option pack

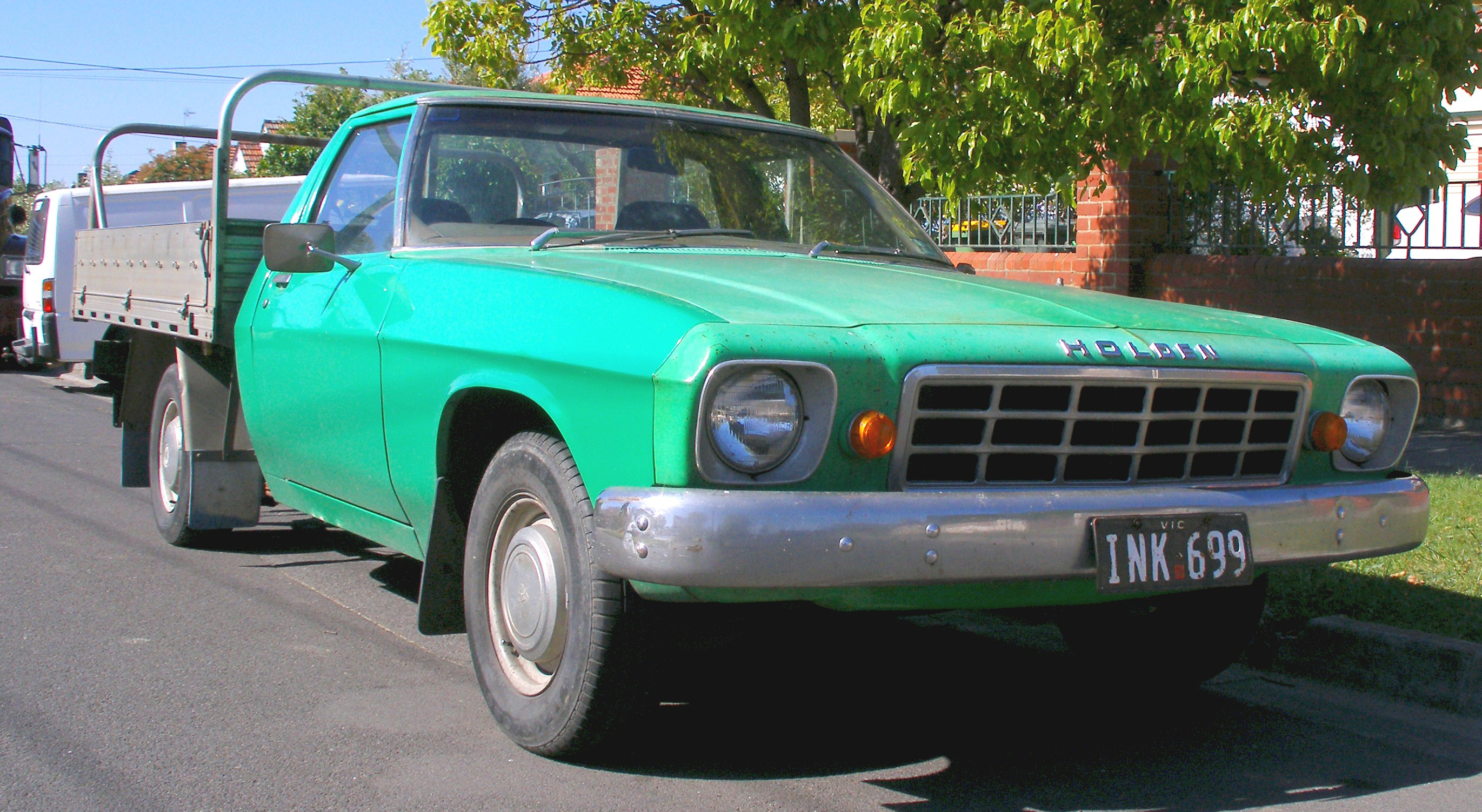
Holden One Tonner

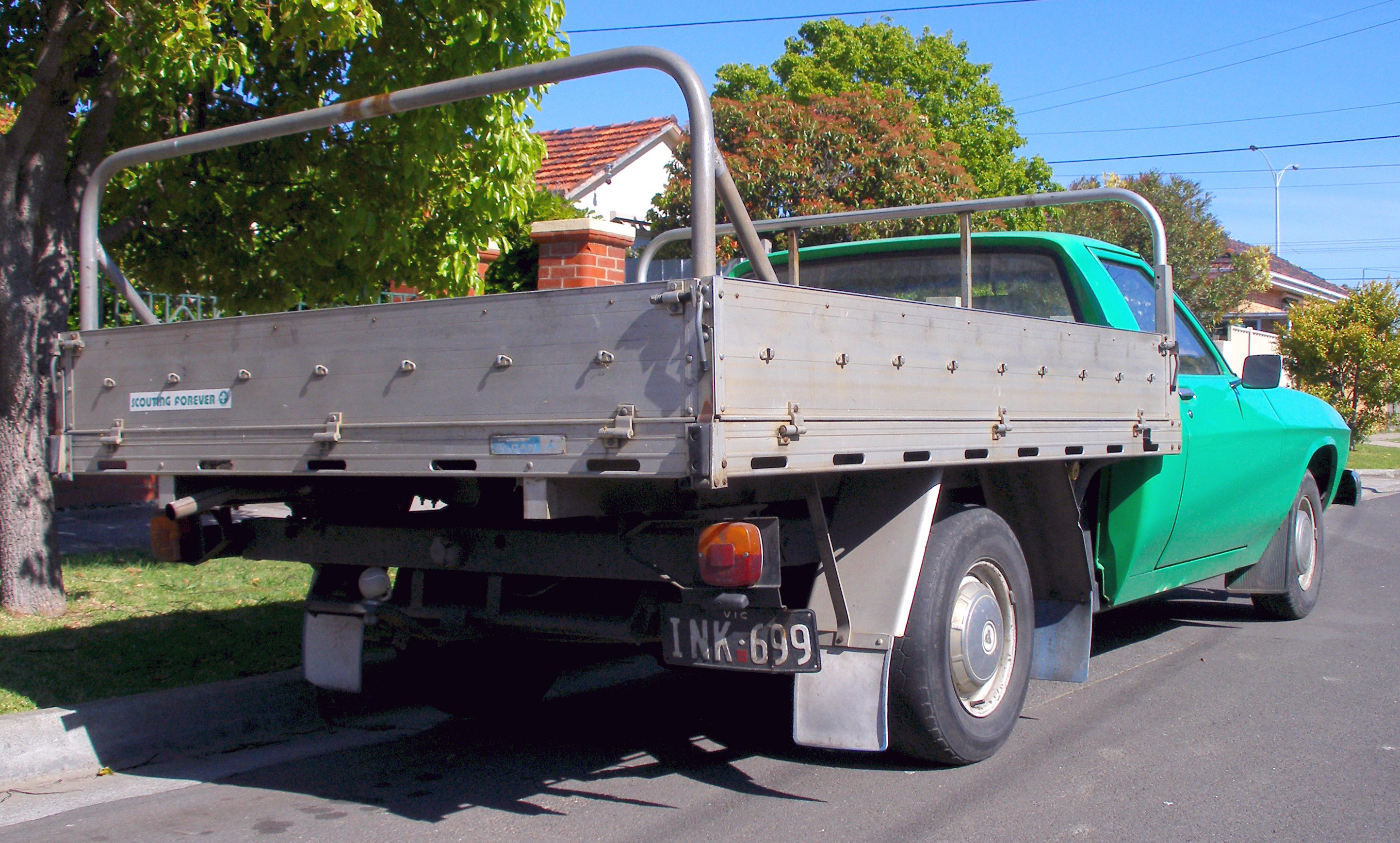
Holden One Tonner

== Engines ==
2.8-litre and 3.3-litre inline six-cylinder engines were available, as were 4.2-litre and 5.0-litre V8 units. The two Monaro GTS models were only offered with the eight-cylinder engines. 13B Wankel in the Mazda Roadpacer AP which is a rebadged HJ Premier.

== Production ==
The Holden HJ was replaced by the Holden HX series in July 1976, HJ production having totalled 176,202 vehicles.

== Statesman HJ ==
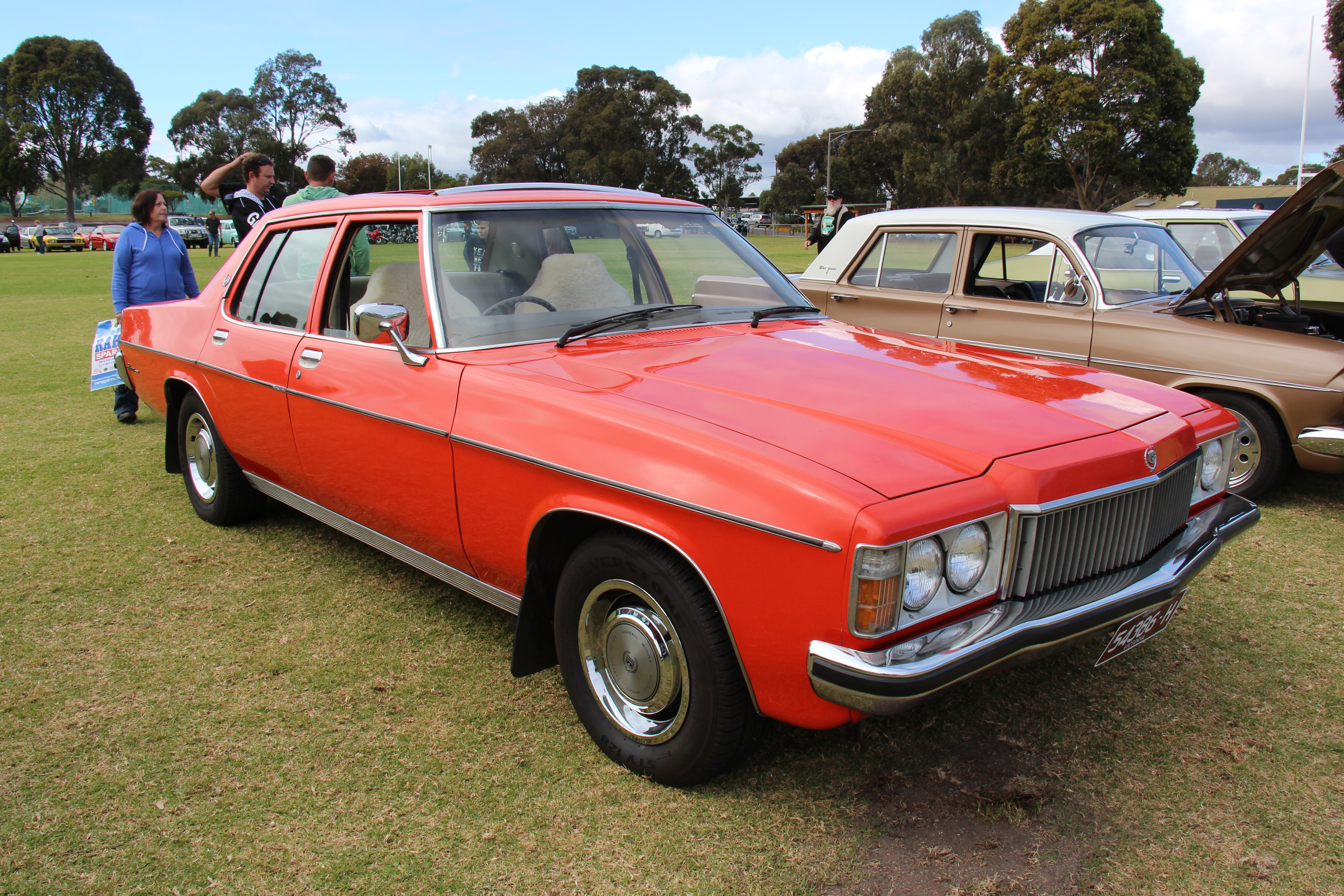
Statesman De Ville (HJ)

The Statesman HJ range of long-wheelbase luxury sedans developed from the Holden HJ series was also released in 1974. The two models in the range, the de Ville and the Caprice, were marketed as Statesmans rather than as Holdens.
