= Holden Kingswood =

Mid-size and full-size car from Holden

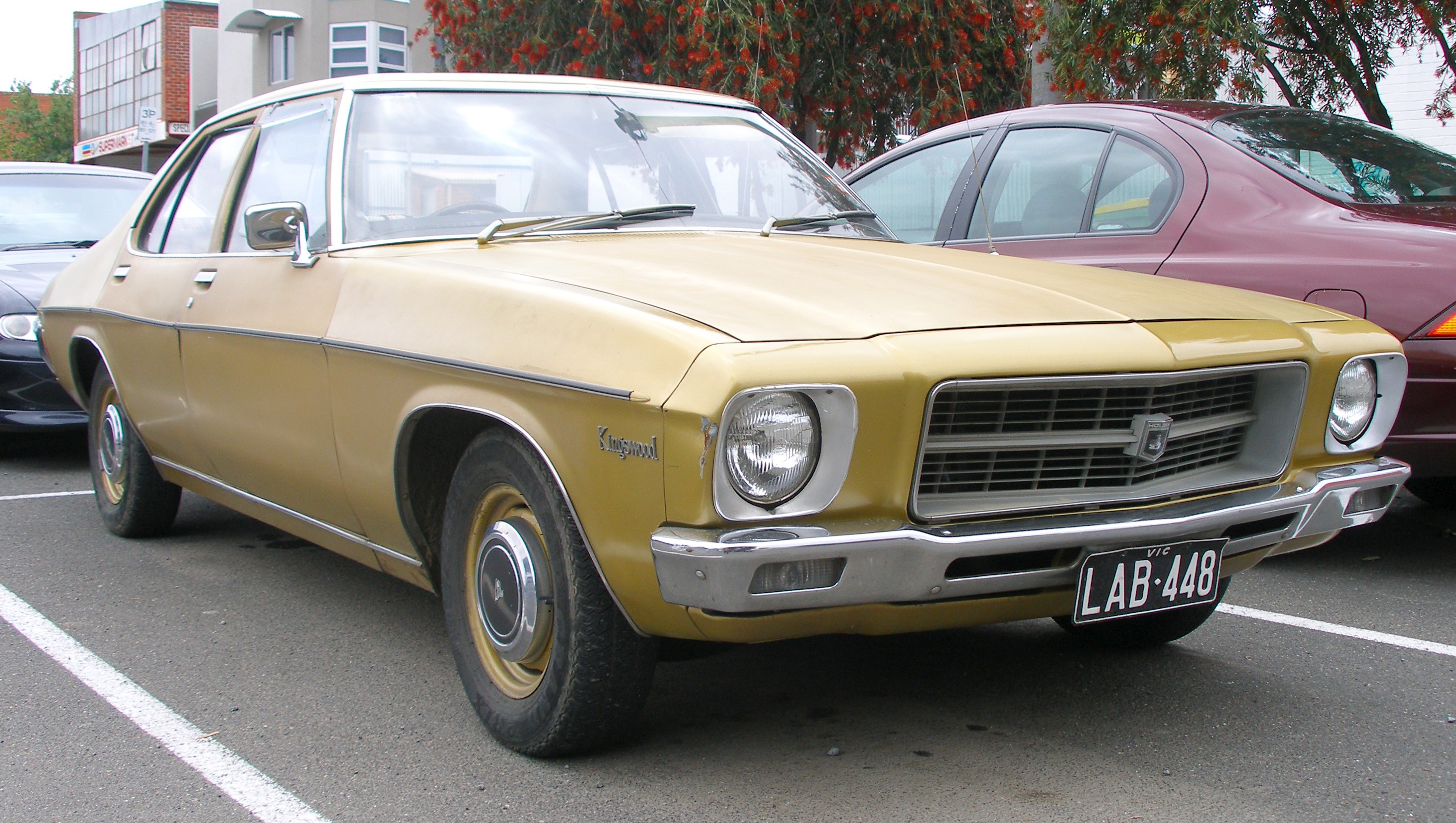
- 1971–1974 Holden Kingswood (HQ) sedan

Overview
- Manufacturer: Holden (General Motors)
- Also called: Holden Belmont; Holden Premier; Holden One Tonner; Holden Sandman
- Production: 1968–1985

Body and chassis
- Class: Full-size
- Body style: 2-door coupe utility; 3-door panel van; 4-door sedan; 5-door station wagon
- Related: Statesman (1st Generation)

Chronology
- Predecessor: Holden Special
- Successor: Holden Commodore

The Holden Kingswood is a full-size car that was developed and manufactured in Australia by Holden, from the beginning of the HK series in 1968 through to the conclusion of the WB series in 1985. Prior to 1968, the full-size Holden range of family cars comprised the Holden Standard, the Holden Special, and Holden Premier models. Initially, the HK range of models included the basic Holden Belmont (replacing the Standard), the Kingswood (replacing the Special), and the luxury-oriented Holden Premier, all of which were manufactured in a choice of sedan and station wagon bodies. Commercial variants were offered in three types: coupé utility, panel van, and later from 1971, the Holden One Tonner cab chassis. The Utility version was originally marketed in both Belmont and Kingswood models. However, after the Belmont name was deleted from commercials at the end of HQ in late 1974, the base model commercials were sold only with the "Holden" badge (the Belmont name continued on sedan and wagon variants until the end of the HX series).

A two-door Holden Monaro coupé and extended-length luxury Holden Brougham were also introduced in mid 1968. For HK, HT, HG and HQ the Holden Monaro carried the ID plate luxury level coding for a Kingswood but never wore Kingswood badges as a production car. HQ-HJ Monaro LS and HQ Monaro LS V8 shared luxury level coding with their respective Premier but also never wore Premier badges. HK-HJ Monaro GTS coupe, HJ Monaro GTS sedan, HT-HQ Monaro GTS V8 coupe and Monaro GTS327/350 coupe (HK-HQ) carried unique luxury level coding.

HQ Monaro GTS sedan and HQ Monaro GTS350 sedan shared Kingswood luxury level coding with later examples actually displaying the GTS coupe's Q code on the VIN plate but still retaining the HQ V8 Kingswood's 80469 model coding on the body plate. The Brougham was replaced in 1971 by the Statesman brand, based upon the station wagon chassis of the then new HQ series.

A new Kingswood model was introduced at the start of the HX Holden series in mid 1976, the Kingswood panel van.

Outside of Australia, the Holden range (including Kingswoods in various body styles) and its derivatives have been sold in New Zealand, parts of Asia and Africa, and parts of the South Pacific, branded as Holden or Chevrolet.

Following the late-1960s import cessation of the Canadian-sourced Chevrolet Impala and Chevelle in South Africa, the Holden Kingswood / Premier and Holden Brougham models were badge engineered as Chevrolet Kommando and Chevrolet Constantia, respectively. Holden-based style-side utilities in South Africa were known as the Chevrolet El Camino. Between 1974 and 1978, the one-tonne cab-chassis utility was sold as the Chevrolet El Toro.

The Kingswood passenger car and Kingswood panel van ceased production with the demise of the HZ series in 1980, the passenger range succeeded by the smaller Commodore released two years earlier. However, the Kingswood name survived via the utility that comprised part of the WB series range manufactured between 1980 and 1985, sold alongside the WB Statesman and the WB Holden utility, panel van and One Tonner.

== First generation (1968–1971) ==
First generation
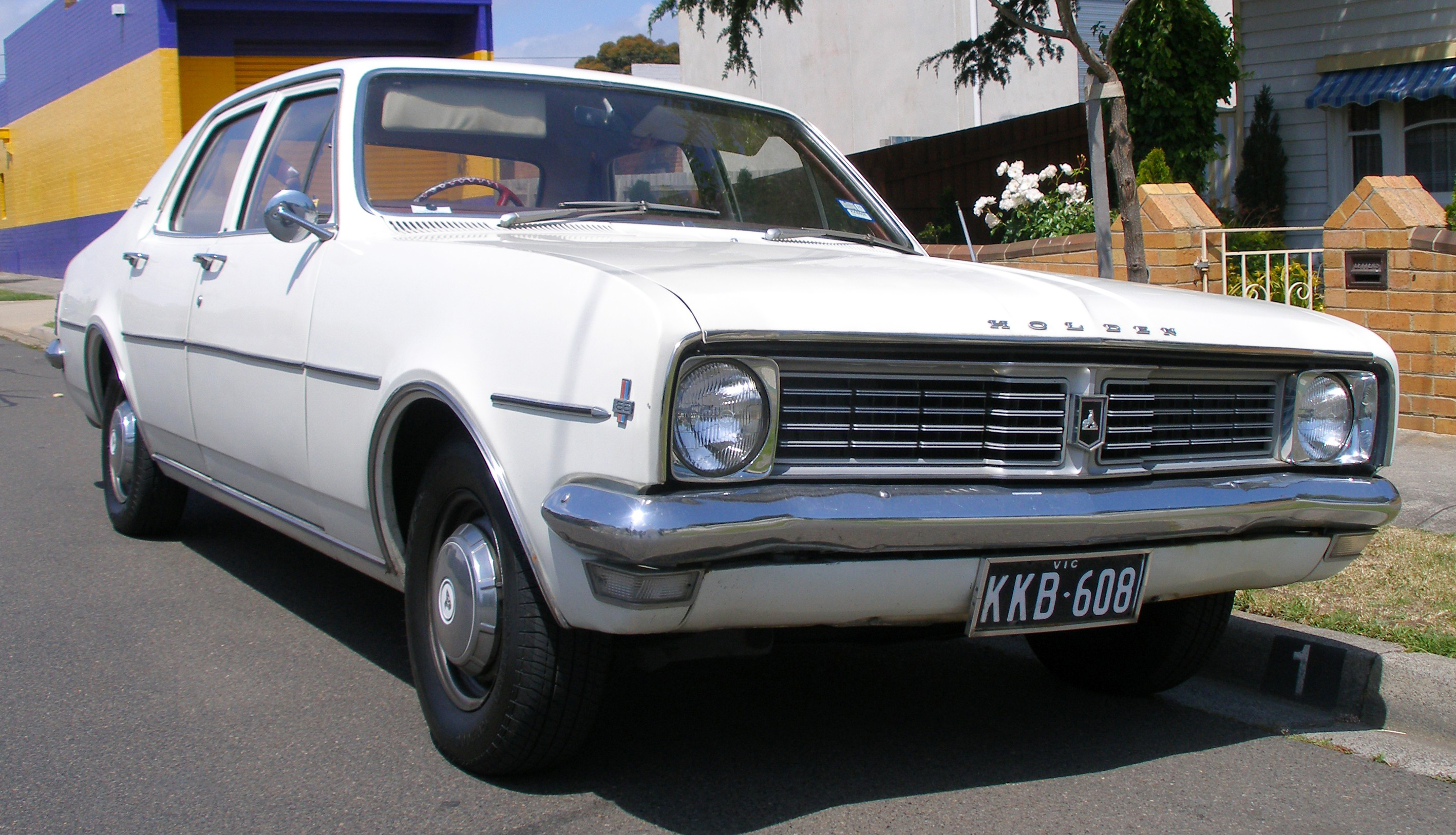

Overview
- Production: 1968–1971

Body and chassis
- Related: Holden Monaro; Holden Brougham; Chevrolet Kommando; Chevrolet Constantia

=== HK ===
The Kingswood sedan and wagon were released as part of the new HK series of Holdens in January 1968 (commercials: March 1968). This was an all-new body design, larger and heavier than the previous HR series. The HK series carried over the same local six-cylinder engines, but introduced the first V8 into the Holden range, the fully imported 307-cubic-inch (5.0 L) Chevrolet small-block engine.

The Monaro and the Brougham were introduced mid-year of 1968, thereby broadening GM's range of locally built full-size cars in Australia.

=== HT ===
The HT series launched in May 1969 and with it the introduction of a new locally manufactured Holden 253-cubic-inch (4.1 L) and 308-cubic-inch (5.0 L) Holden V8 engines. The 253 was available on all HT models except Brougham, and the 308 was available only in Brougham. The 307-cubic-inch (5.0 L) Chevrolet V8 engine remained an option for all HT series models except Brougham until stocks were depleted and it was replaced with the 308. The advertising campaign for this model was 'Never Late, in a Three-Oh-Eight'.

The range of three six-cylinder engines carried over to the HT series, however the transmission options for the V8 engines were many and varied. Initially, the 253 V8 only came with either three-speed column- or four-speed floor-mounted manual transmissions. The 307 V8 was only available with two-speed Powerglide automatic. This arrangement continued until the 307 stocks were exhausted, following which the 253 and 308 locally built V8 engines could then be ordered with any manual or automatic transmission across the range, excepting the Holden Brougham which was always specified as a 308 automatic. A new locally manufactured three-speed automatic transmission, the Tri-Matic, was introduced late in the life of the HT range, except on HT Brougham which retained the two-speed automatic Powerglide transmission.

=== HG ===
The HG series of July 1970 was a minor refinement of the existing formula, adopted as the marketing platform for the new three-speed automatic transmission option called Tri-Matic. The first of these locally made transmissions actually found their way into the last of the HT series cars. These transmissions were later criticised for unreliability and became colloquially known by dispondants, as the Traumatic. Only the HG Monaro GTS350 retained the Powerglide transmission if an automatic preference was optioned.

HG commercial variants continued to be built and sold alongside the HQ series passenger vehicles until very late in 1971 when the HQ commercials were released. These HG commercials were upgraded to the newer specification HQ 173ci and 202ci 6cyl engines but retained the HG specification transmissions (cable kickdown 6cyl and V8 Trimatics and V8 M21 Saginaw) and V8 engines which are believed to have been stockpiled in sufficient quantity to cover expected requirements. These HG commercials can easily be identified by the A prefix on the chassis number appearing on the firewall and for vehicles built for sale inside Australia on the Safety Compliance Plate.

== Second generation (1971–1985) ==
Second generation
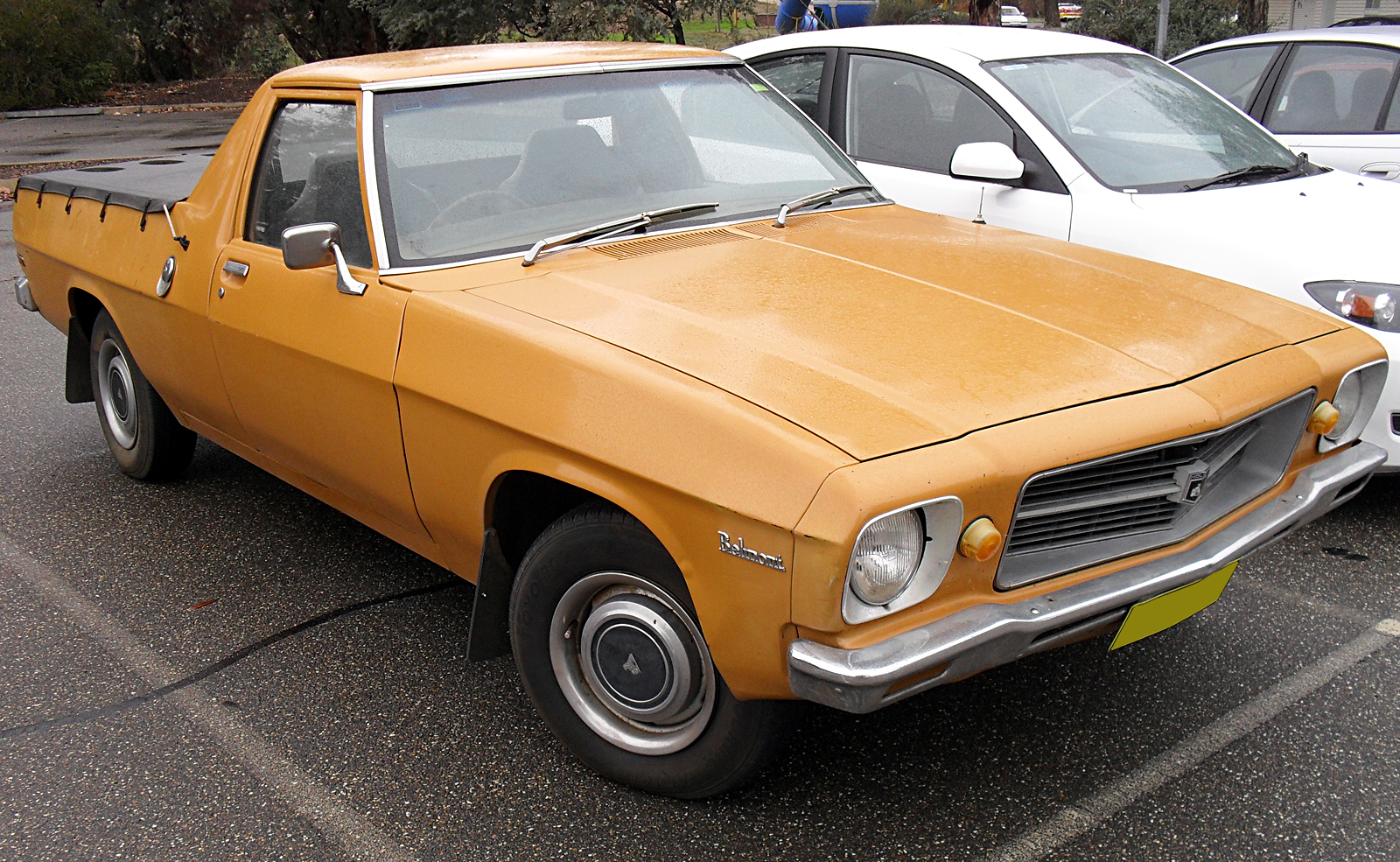

Overview
- Production: 1971–1985

Body and chassis
- Related: Holden Monaro; Statesman; Chevrolet Kommando; Chevrolet Constantia; Mazda Roadpacer

=== HQ ===
The HQ series of 1971 was a completely new design, introducing larger capacity 173-cubic-inch (2.85 L) and 202-cubic-inch (3.3 L) six-cylinder engines, with the continued availability of 253-cubic-inch (4.2 L), 308-cubic-inch (5.0 L) Holden and 350-cubic-inch (5.7 L) Chevrolet V8 engines. HQ was the most radically engineered Holden since the introduction of the original 48-215 model of 23 years prior. It featured a perimeter frame and semi-monocoque (unibody) construction, and was the first full-size Holden to have coil spring rear suspension. As a cost-saving measure, HQ was only engineered for right-hand drive, hence it was not feasible to sell the car in left-hand drive markets. Thus Holden exports declined from 41,181 in 1973 to just 7,440 in 1975. Over the following years this led to a large decline in export vehicle revenue needed to fund the HQ-HZ series replacement. Despite this, HQ became Holden's most popular car, selling 485,650 units, a total yet to be surpassed in a Holden. It was however, sold over a longer timeframe than previous models.

At the time, Holden's then Chief Engineer, an American named George Roberts, insisted that the HQ Holdens should "ride like a Cadillac" and that the front suspension be engineered to make the car prone to understeer for "safety reasons". Advertising of the car promoted its "jet-smooth ride" over rough roads. Notwithstanding persistent criticism from many motoring journalists, this policy persisted with the subsequent HJ and HX facelift models. It was arguable whether Australian buyers favoured this engineering philosophy and it was not until the 1977 HZ facelift that radical changes were made to the suspension to improve handling.

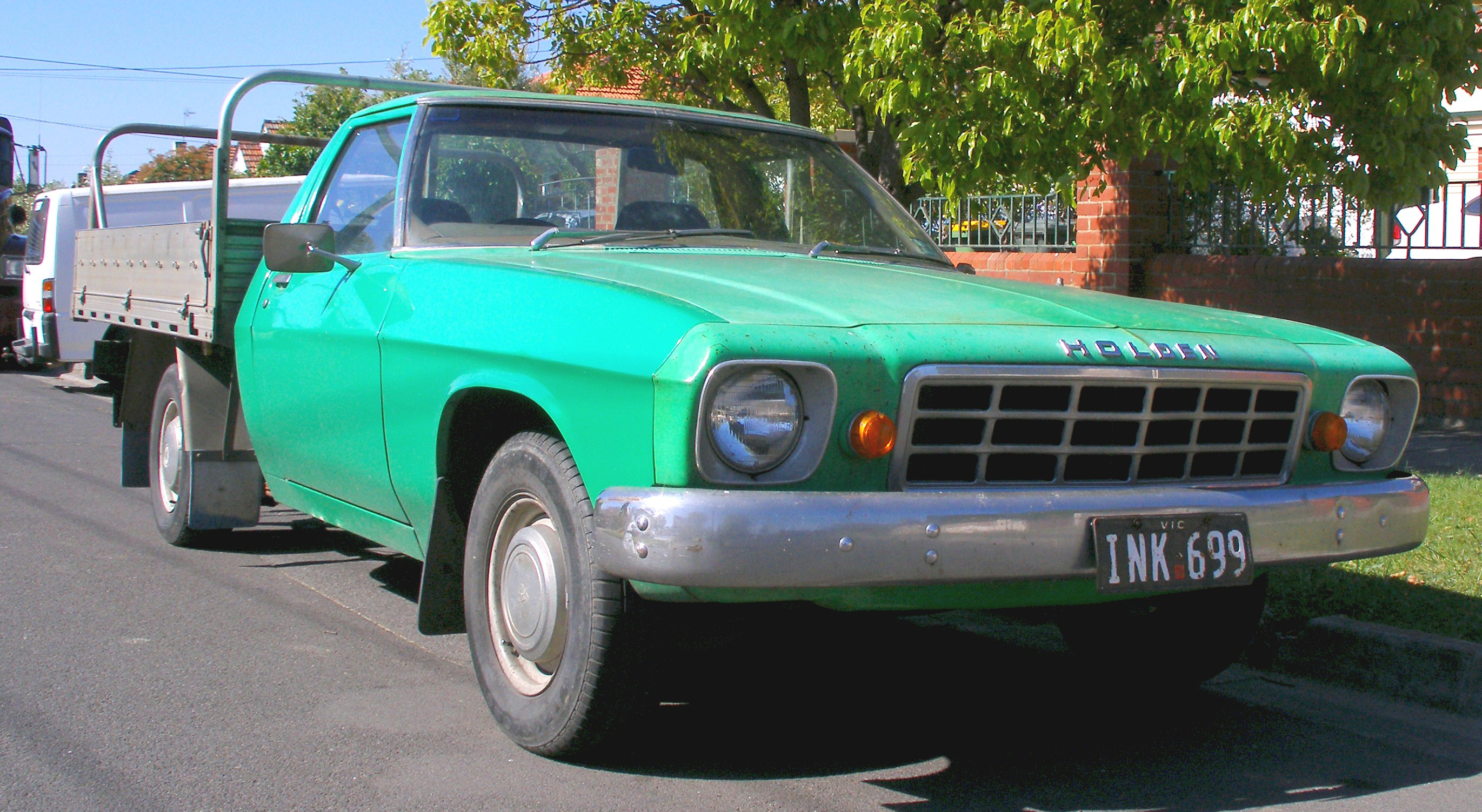
HJ (pictured), HX and HZ One Tonner models retained the original HQ One Tonner front fascia.

In Mid 1972, Holden released a limited edition version of the HQ Belmont sedan, named 'SS' Adopted from Chevrolet Super Sport Models in the United States and other markets, Option code 'XV2' Included the choice of three very 70's Colours: Infra Red (Dark Orange), Lettuce Alone (Light Green) or Ultraviolet (Purplish - Grey Metallic), Vinyl Stripe and 'SS' Decal kit supplied by 3M Australia, a choice between 253 (4.2L) or 308 (5.0L) Holden V8 engine mated to a 4 Speed Manual Gearbox backed by a 10-Bolt Salisbury Differential with a 3.36:1 Ratio (and painted.. unusually, White, Along with the driveshaft), along with Pontiac-style Rallye weels. On the inside: Standard Black Belmont Door trims, Optional armrests, However, unusual to the Belmont, A full Sport Gauge Cluster, Steering Wheel, Carpet, Floor Shift, Center Console and Bucket Seats in Black Vinyl with Houndstooth or Flax inserts, The SS was initially limited to 1800 units, but extended by 1300 due to unprecedented sales demand.

In late 1972, Holden released a special edition version of the HQ Kingswood sedan and wagon, named Kingswood Vacationer. This value package of options proved popular and made return appearances on various Holden models during the next twenty years or so. Holden, in 1974 introduced the Sandman, a version of the utility or panel van designed to incorporate many of the features of the Monaro, such as sports instrumentation, sports steering wheel and bucket seats, and "rally" road wheels with a choice of two six-cylinder and two V8 engines. Other available options included automatic transmission, power steering, and air-conditioning. Sandmans were visually identified by stick-on vinyl decals on the exterior. It gained notoriety during the latter half of the 1970s as a mobile venue for sexual intercourse. Vans earned nicknames as shaggin' wagons and sinbins.

In 1971 CKD HQ production started in Thailand. HQ's were also CKD manufactured in Indonesia and the Philippines for many years. There was also a program for Mazda in Japan to produce the HQ from CKD kits, which is believed not to have gone beyond the pilot stage.

=== HJ ===
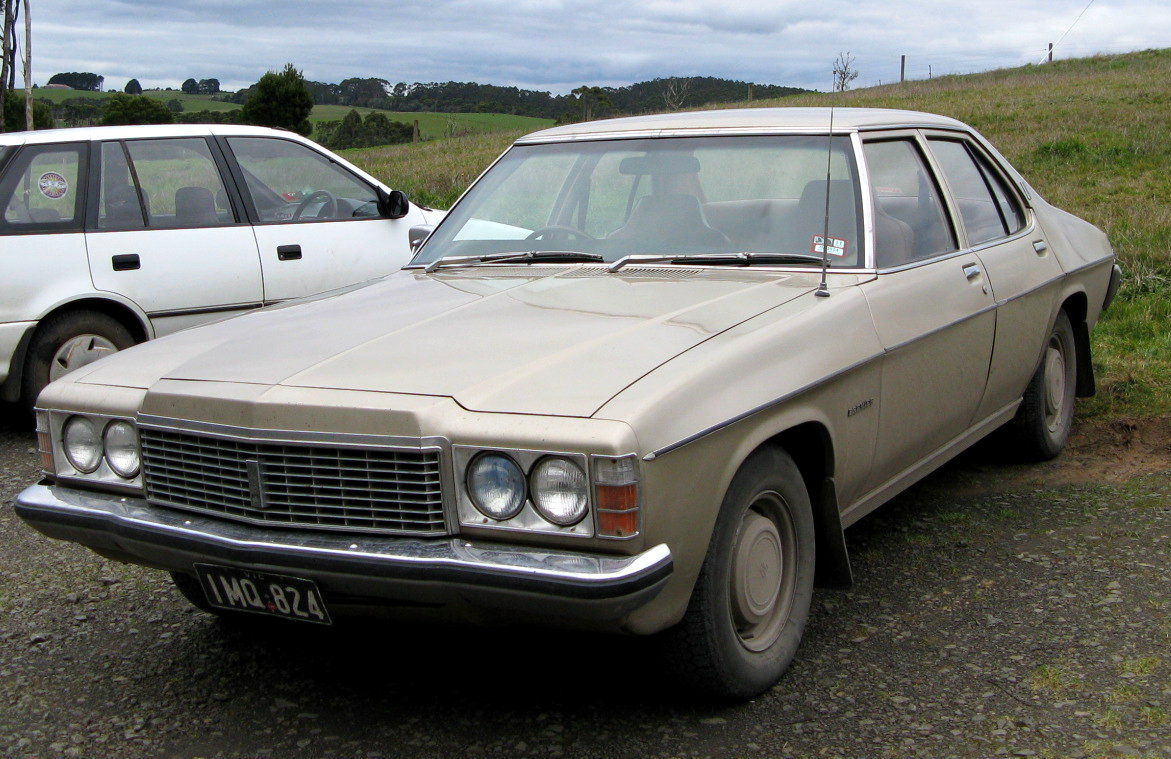
1974–1976 Holden HJ Premier, the luxury variant of the HJ short-wheelbase range.

Released in 1974, the HJ series received some major frontal appearance styling changes, taking away some of the "softness" of the HQ cars. HJ saw the Belmont name disappear off utilities and panel vans to be replaced with an "unbadged" specification. HJ also saw the demise of separate models for V8 powered variants, for example in HQ a V8 Kingswood sedan had model code 0469 and its six-cylinder version was 0369. In HJ all Kingswoods were a single model—WN69—regardless of engine. Engine displacement was now expressed in metric terms, and the 3.3-litre (202 cu in) six-cylinder engine became the standard power unit for all Kingswood variants and higher luxury levels. The 2.84-litre (173 cu in) six remained the standard engine for the entry-level Belmont and "unbadged" commercials. As with the engine, the Belmont also saw the omission of front disc brakes, now a standard fitment on all Kingswood models.

A couple of special-build variants emerged later in production, initially with the Kingswood Deluxe sedan in July 1975 and later the Kingswood Vacationer II sedan and wagon in November 1975. Added features for these cars included automatic transmission, radial tyres, floor carpeting, radio, and a range of two-tone body colours.

Some HJ series Premier based vehicles were assembled by Mazda in Japan, which fitted with the company's rotary engine. The car, manufactured between 1975 and 1977 sold as the Mazda Roadpacer was quite heavy and the rotary engine of the time was severely underpowered. To compensate for the lack of performance, Mazda endowed the car with a myriad of electrical gadgets, thus making the performance even worse.

=== HX ===
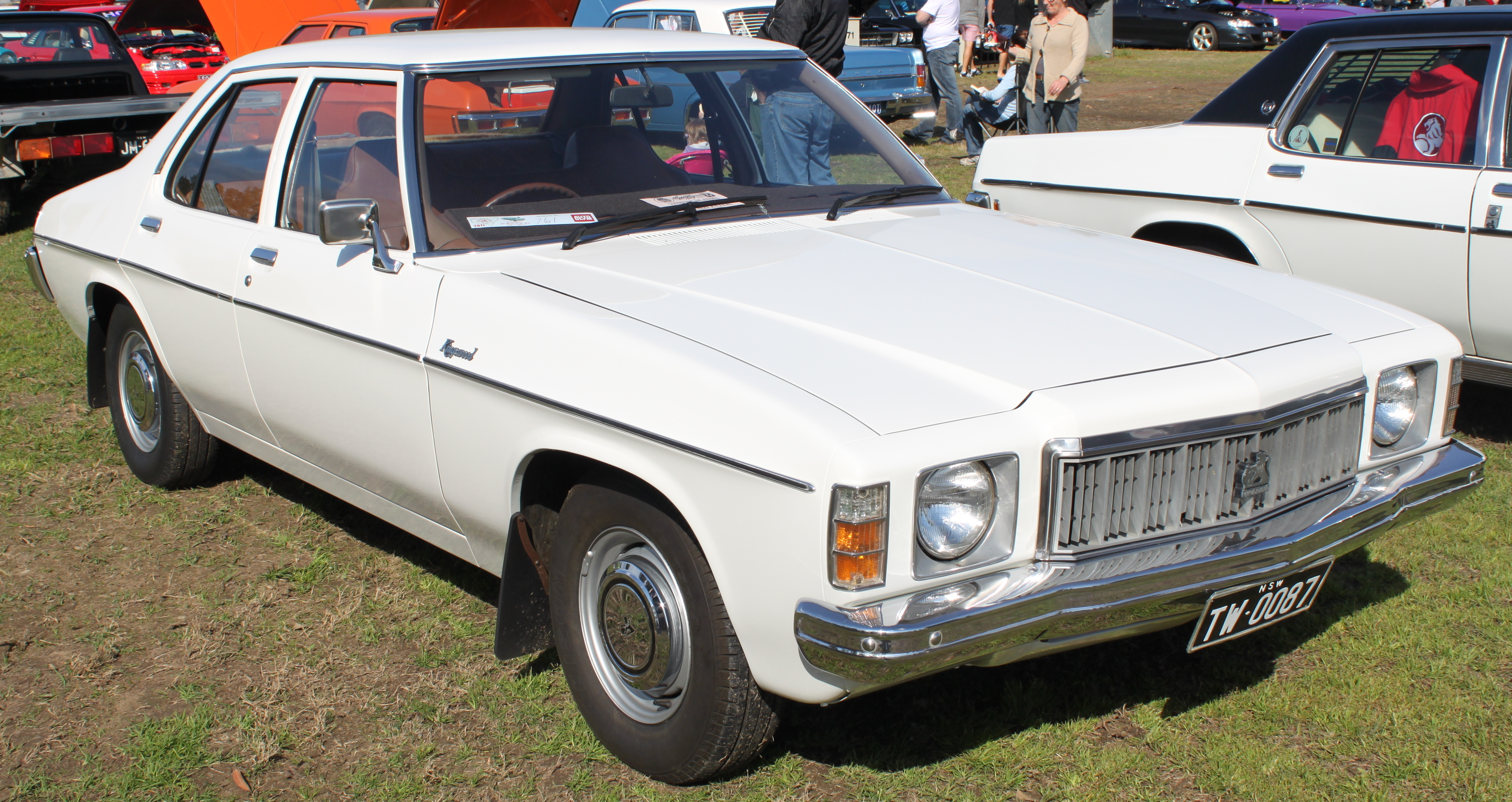
The mid-level model of the HX range, the Kingswood.

The HX series release of 1976 saw only minor updates to the exterior, notably the grille and badgework, although base specification utilities and panel vans retained the HJ grille (except Sandman which got HX Kingswood frontal treatment). When the HX was released, government emissions controls had been tightened and Holden needed to make significant changes to their engines. This resulted in a loss of performance across the range and the deletion of the 2.84-litre straight-six. In addition, a Kingswood panel van was introduced to the range of commercial vehicle offerings. The HX Sandman introduced a large 'Sandman' logo on the tailgate and stripes down the sides. During the course of the HX series, front bucket seats were adopted as standard equipment for Kingswood-badged vehicles. As with the previous series, a couple of special-build HX Kingswood variants emerged later in production, initially with the Kingswood 50th Anniversary sedan in November 1976 and also a repeat appearance of the Kingswood Deluxe sedan.

=== HZ ===
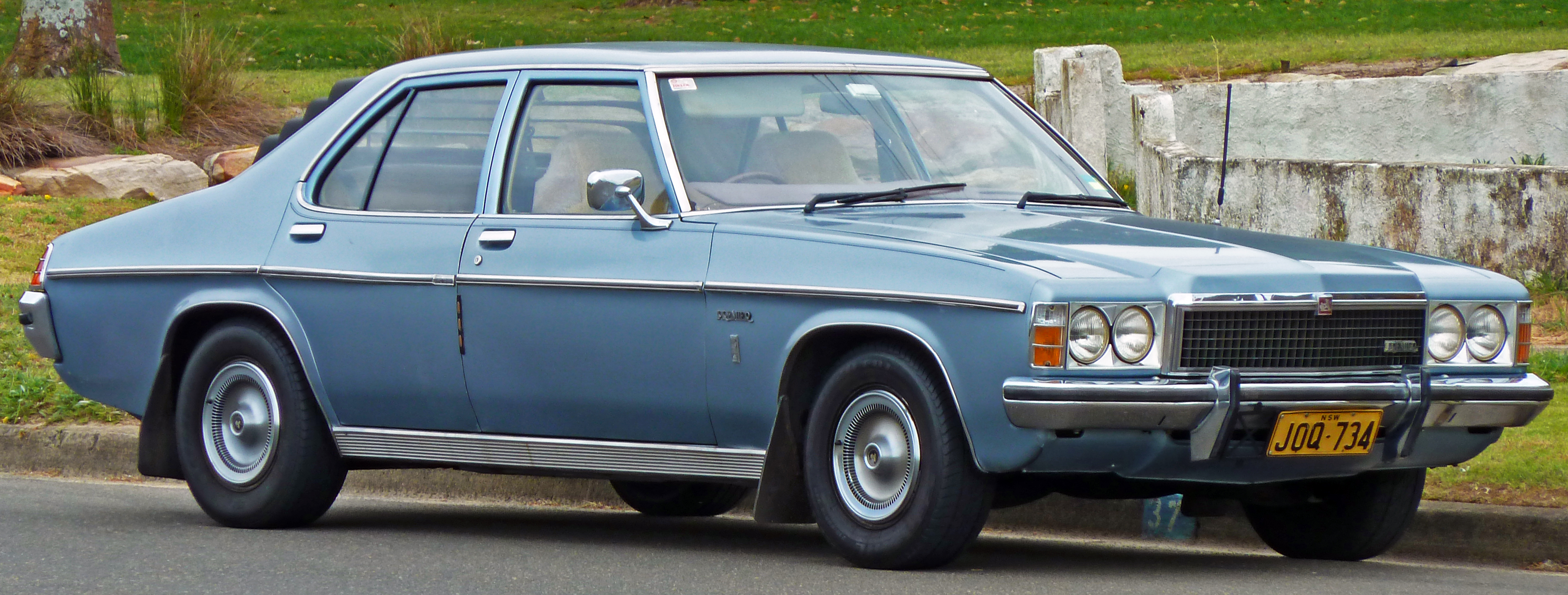
HZ Premier

The 1977 HZ series received minor updates to the exterior, and saw the introduction of what Holden termed "Radial Tuned Suspension" (RTS) on all models. RTS made significant changes to the suspension of the car, greatly improving the handling finesse, while at the same time not compromising ride quality. Modern Motor magazine described the HZ as "a great handler spoiled by the car" in a comparison against the BMW 528i, contrasted as "a great car spoiled by the handling". To illustrate, photos were taken of the Holden cornering hard but smoothly, while the BMW spun out of control. However BMW forced the magazine to admit that it had instructed its test driver to throw the BMW into the corner at much higher speed and in a deliberately unstable attitude. In this series, the lower-end Belmont was deleted and the Kingswood became the base model for sedans and wagons, with a new model the slightly more upmarket Kingswood SL introduced. Commercial vehicles—the ute, panel van and cab chassis—were not affected by the rationalisation, with the practice of "unbadged" commercial vehicles continuing. During the course of the HZ series, equipment levels were upgraded in 1978 effectively to match improvements in the opposition Ford Falcon range, but the life of the Kingswood looked set to end following Holden's release of the VB Commodore range of sedans and wagons in November 1978. After 1980, Kingswood passenger cars were cancelled—replaced by the downsized Commodore.

The final HZ Sandman, featured a choice of V8 engines only, along with a four-headlight grille and under bumper front spoiler. According to a GMH Price List dated 25 January 1979, a basic HZ Holden panel van was priced at A$6,076, with the Sandman option package an additional A$1,700. The further optional components also included 5.0-litre V8 engine and a limited slip differential. If a buyer selected every Sandman extra, the price would be more than 150 percent of the cost of the basic HZ model. By the end of 1979, the Sandman had largely lost its place in the contemporary Australian youth culture—order figures were down and many of the vehicles were now being sold with the stripes and tailgate logos deleted. The Sandman ute was phased out of production prior to the van, the last of which was manufactured around October 1979.

=== WB ===
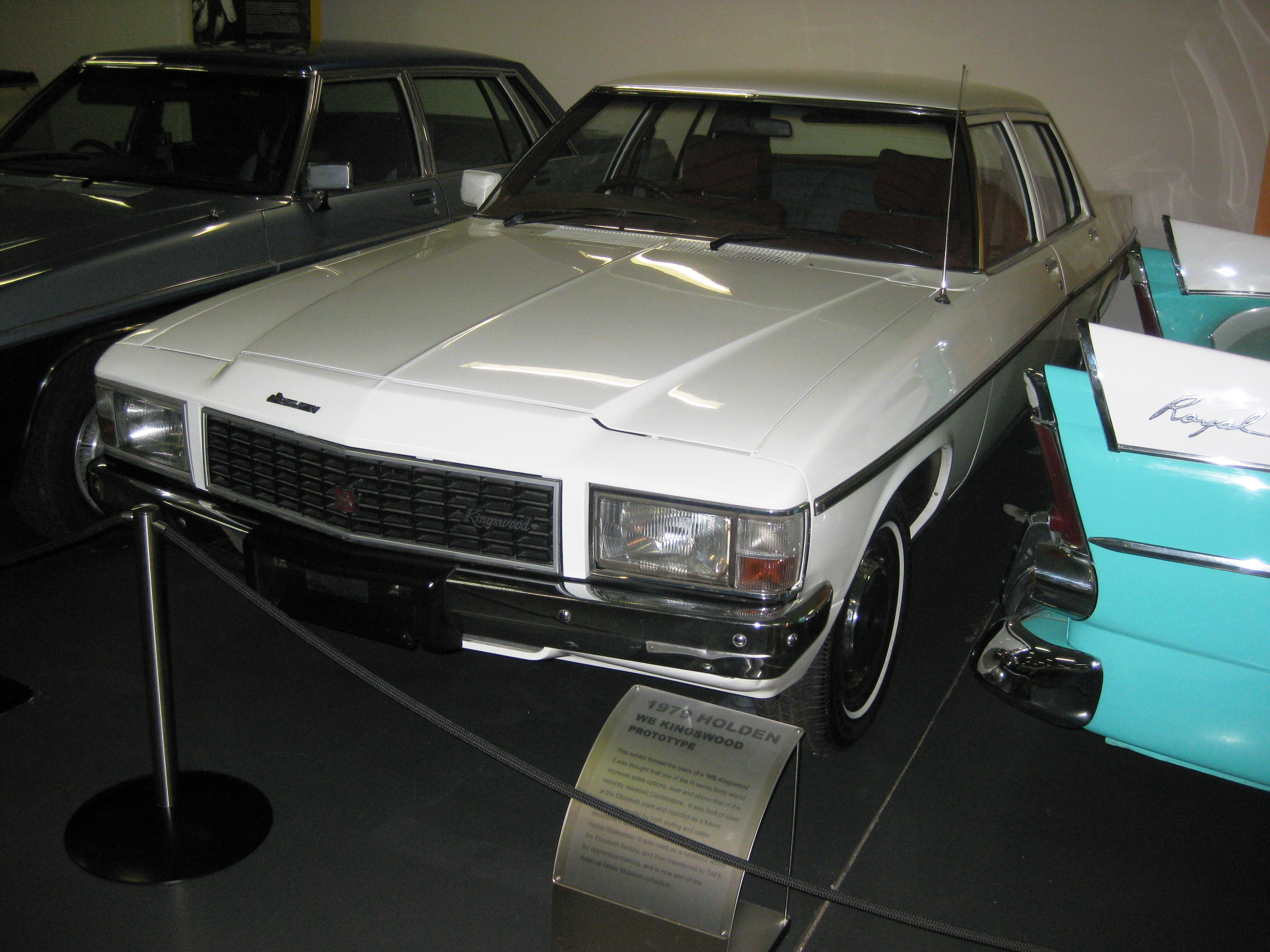
Holden Kingswood (WB) sedan prototype based on the Statesman HZ. This project did not progress to production status.

The last Holden to wear the Kingswood badge was one of the variants of the WB series utility released in 1980. Although the WA and WB projects at Holden were meant to have resulted in all-new full-size cars, the 1973 fuel crisis and cost-cutting meant the scope of changes became more limited each time. Eventually, the WB project was condensed into a major upgrade of the luxury Statesman models and a facelift of the HZ-series commercial models with new headlights, tail lights, grilles and the updated Holden "Blue" six-cylinder engine (4.2-litre V8 optional). The Kingswood was now available on utility only with the panel van joining the One Tonner, but the 5.0-litre V8 engine was no longer officially offered as an available performance option although some were built. There were no passenger car versions of the Kingswood, their place in the Holden range having been absorbed by the Commodore. Production of the entire WB-series finished in 1985 when Holden announced they were vacating local production of large luxury and commercial vehicles due to economics to concentrate on their medium car range, i.e. Camira and Commodore, and imported Isuzu commercial product.

== Third generation (proposed) ==
=== WA ===
After the development of the HQ series and the delays to the facelifted HJ which saw the revised HQ released in 1973, Holden intended to replace the second generations cars with a heavily revised WA series. Several design sketches in various forms have surfaced since the early-1990s, including a liftback body style. The 1973 fuel crisis along with a worsening financial situation, partly caused by the decision to build the HQ in right-hand drive only, thus limiting the previously highly profitable left-hand drive exports, meant that the project was eventually abandoned. GM instead utilised the then forthcoming 1977 Opel Rekord, which was significantly re-engineered and released as the Commodore in 1978 with Holden's own powertrains.

== Exports ==
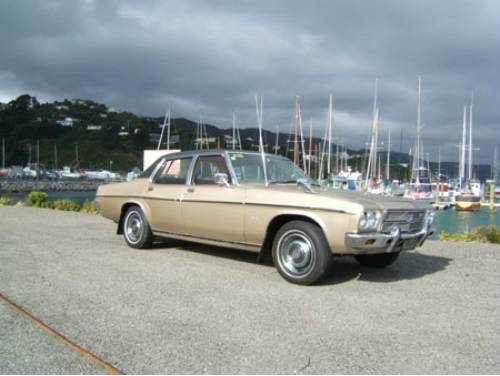
1971–1974 Chevrolet 350 (HQ) sold in New Zealand. The 350 is based on the Statesman, itself an extended length version of the HQ Premier.

Early Holdens were manufactured in New Zealand at the General Motors New Zealand plant in Petone until 1967, and Kingswoods plus other Holden luxury levels were later assembled from complete knock down (CKD) kits at the new car plant at Trentham Upper Hutt further up the Hutt Valley from Wellington. Other Holden models like Monaro were imported completely built up (CBU) from Australia. From the 1960s Australian-made models were exported to Southeast Asia, and also to the Caribbean—the Kingswood was assembled in Trinidad and Tobago.

Some of these HQ-series models—assembled in Australia—were sold in New Zealand as the "Chevrolet 350" from 1971 to 1974. They differed little from the locally assembled 308-cubic-inch (5.0 L) V8 Statesman apart from the larger US made engine, a new grille with the Chevrolet logo, badges and hub caps, and effectively replaced the Canadian-sourced Chevrolet Impalas last sold in 1969.

=== South Africa ===
Until the late 1960s, the Special, Kingswood (from HK), Premier, and Monaro were sold in South Africa as Holdens, before the demise of Canadian-sourced Chevrolet Impala and Chevelle, which led to the introduction of the Chevrolet Kommando and Chevrolet Constantia, which were based on the HT, HG, and later HQ Kingswood and Premier respectively, using either Holden's 202 cu in (3.3 L) straight-six, 308 cu in (5.0 L) V8, or later the 230 and 250 cu in (3.8 and 4.1 L) Chevrolet sixes. There was a short period when HT and HG variants were sold with both Holden and Chevrolet badging, the Holden versions shared nose styling with Australian cars. Some surviving examples of both brands, especially Monaro coupes (HT badged Holden Monaro; HG Chevrolet SS) have been 'reimported' to Australia by classic car enthusiasts. Some were exported to a few Southeast Asian markets (Thailand, Malaysia, Singapore) and marketed in their respective markets. The Constantia name was in reference to the grand Groot Constantia wine estate, with its world-famous gabled Cape-Dutch homestead featuring as the model's emblem, while Kommando referred to the Boer Commando squads during the Anglo-Boer War. The South African version of the HQ was coded AQ, and was very similar to the Chevrolet 350 sold by Chevrolet/Vauxhall dealers in New Zealand.

In 1971, following the dropping of the Holden brand in South Africa, the Holden utility became known as the Chevrolet El Camino. Between 1974 and 1978, the one-tonne utility sold as the Chevrolet El Torro. Also in 1971, the Holden Monaro was made available locally as the Chevrolet SS. In late 1975, for the 1976 model year, updated models were introduced, again as a Kommando with the 250 cu in (4.1 L) straight-six, Constantia with the 250 and 308 cu in (5.0 L) V8, and the Caprice Classic, also with the 308. The inline-six was modified for better economy, but sales never climbed to their previous levels after the 1973 oil crisis. There was also a better equipped Kommando LS, with standard automatic transmission. The Constantia station wagon was a new model for 1976.

In 1979 the Holden-sourced models were replaced by Chevrolet-badged versions of the Opel Rekord, Commodore (similar to Holden's own VB Commodore) and Senator. It would not be until 2001 that a Holden-sourced Chevrolet, the Lumina, was sold in South Africa.

== In popular culture ==
A first generation 1971 Holden Kingswood sedan is featured in the New Zealand television series, The Brokenwood Mysteries, as the vehicle driven by the series star, Neill Rea, in his role as Detective Senior Sergeant Mike Shepherd. Apparently, the car is intended to represent the least glamorous transportation that D.S.S. Shepherd could possibly obtain. Passengers in Shepherd's car are subjected to his favourite country songs (both well-known and obscure), always played on the car's cassette player. The same array of country songs make up the soundtrack for the series.

The Australian sitcom Kingswood Country derived its name from the car the lead character, Ted Bullpit, drove (though it was replaced with a Holden Commodore later in its run).
