= Statesman (automobile) =

Automotive marque created in 1971 by Holden

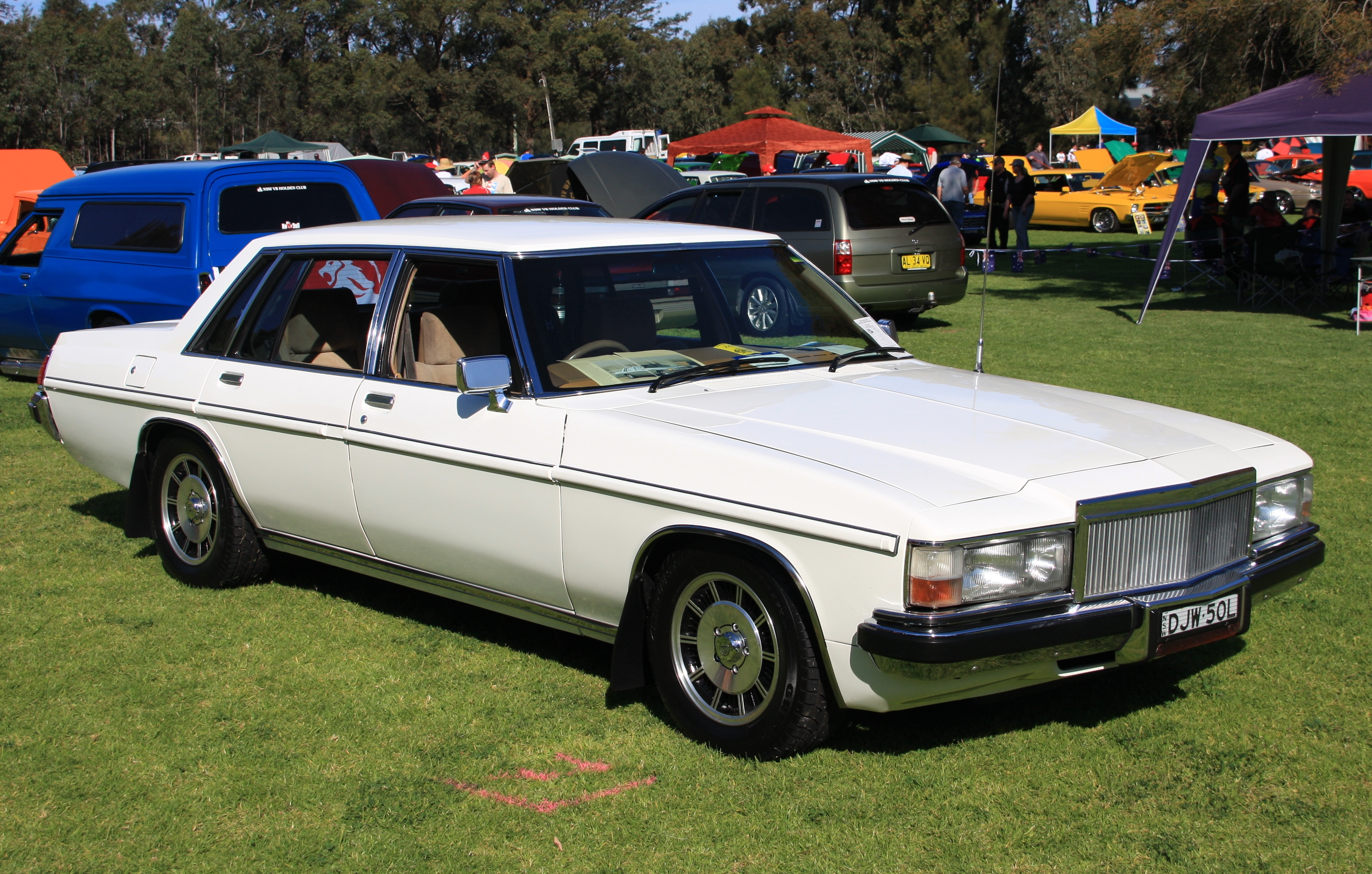
- Statesman Caprice (WB)

Overview
- Manufacturer: Holden
- Also called: Chevrolet 350 (New Zealand); Chevrolet Constantia (South Africa); Chevrolet Caprice Classic (South Africa); Chevrolet de Ville (South Africa & Thailand); Isuzu Statesman de Ville (Japan)
- Production: July 1971 – January 1985
- Assembly: Australia: Adelaide, South Australia (Elizabeth); New Zealand: Wellington (Trentham); South Africa: Port Elizabeth (GMSA); Thailand (CKD)
- Designer: Leo Pruneau

Body and chassis
- Class: Full-size luxury car
- Body style: 4-door sedan
- Platform: Holden HQ
- Related: Holden Kingswood

Powertrain
- Engine: 202 cu in (3.3 L) I6; 253 cu in (4.2 L) V8; 308 cu in (5.0 L) V8; 350 cu in (5.7 L) V8

Chronology
- Predecessor: Holden Brougham
- Successor: Holden Statesman / Caprice

Statesman is an automotive marque created in 1971 by the Australian General Motors subsidiary, Holden. Statesman vehicles were sold through Holden dealerships, and were initially based on the mainstream Holden HQ station wagon platform, thereby providing more interior room and generally more luxurious features than their Holden-branded sedan siblings. Production ceased with the last of the WB series cars in January 1985.

GM Holden reintroduced the range in 1990 with two long-wheelbase sedans; however, the cars were no longer marketed as Statesman by brand name, but instead as the Holden Statesman and the Holden Caprice. In September 2010 with the "Series II" updating of the WM series, use of the long-serving Statesman name was discontinued. From 2011 to 2015 Holden's long-wheelbase contenders were branded as the Holden Caprice and Holden Caprice V. From the 2016 model year the Caprice was discontinued, leaving the Caprice V as the last remaining Australian build long-wheelbase sedan. The Caprice V was discontinued in October 2017 as Holden closed down its Australian manufacturing operations.

== HQ ==
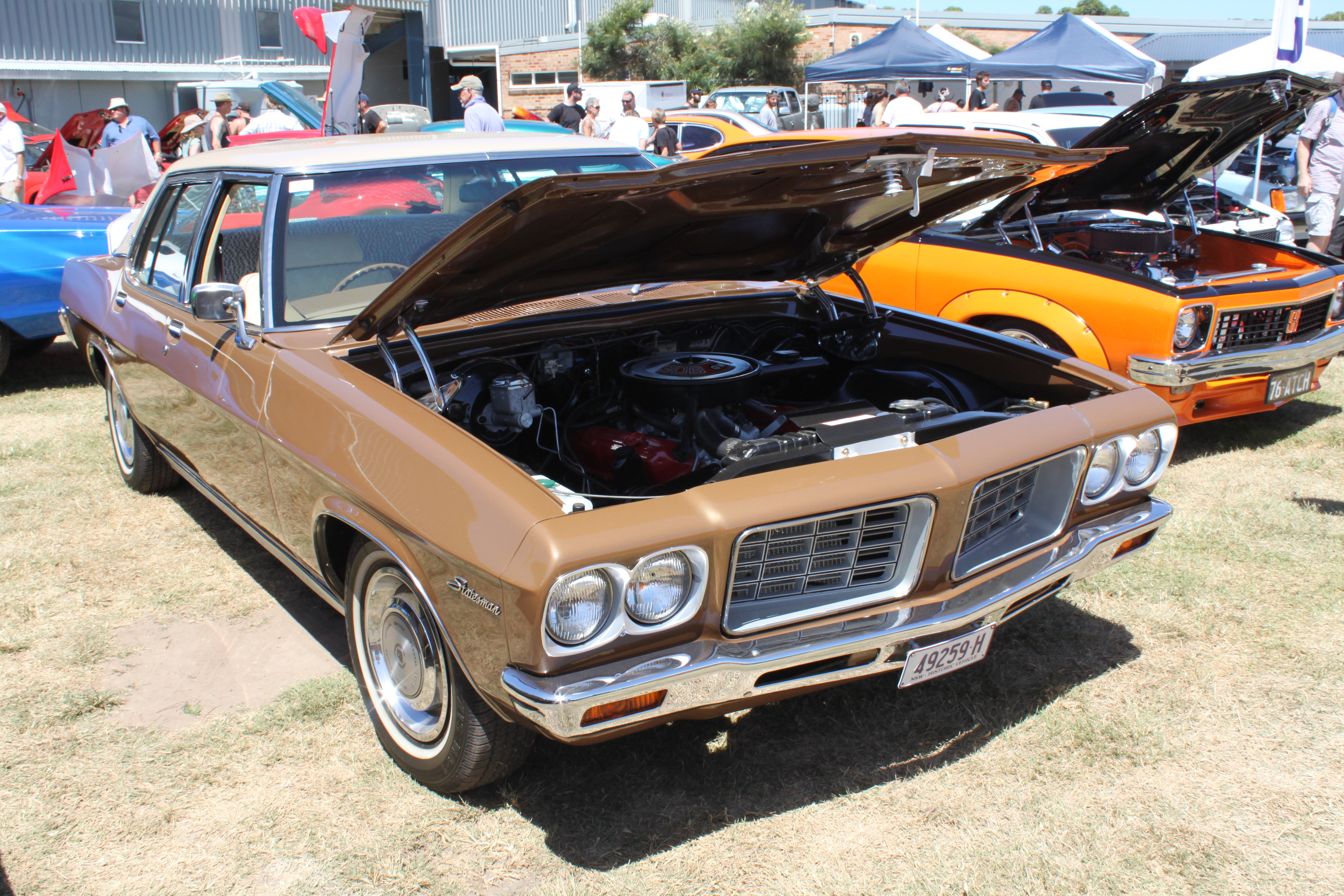
Statesman Custom (HQ)

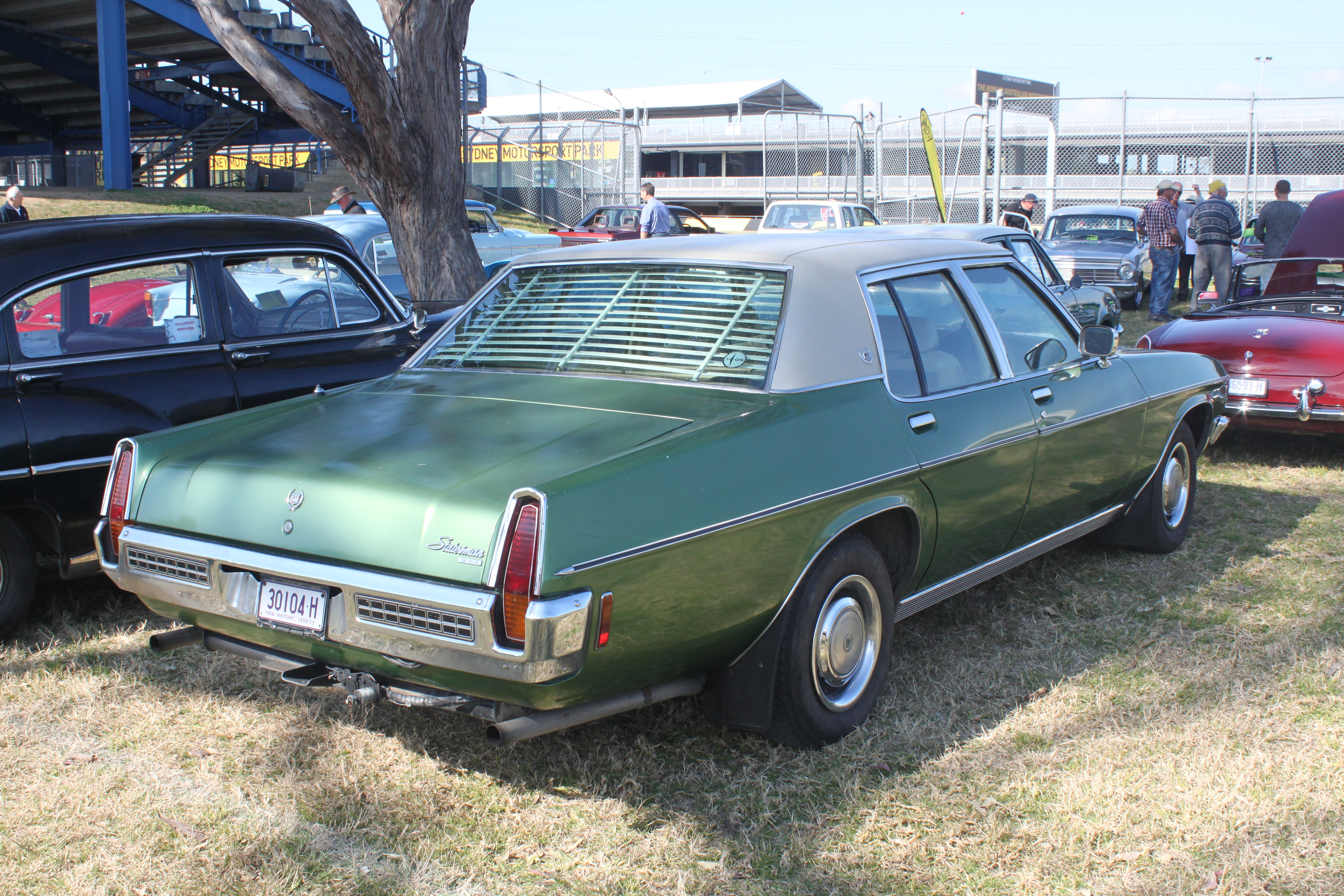
Statesman de Ville (HQ)

The original Statesman HQ long-wheelbase sedans were released on 22 July 1971 as a replacement for the HG series Holden Brougham, although drawings exist of an HQ Brougham, albeit in short-wheelbase guise. Statesman sedans were initially offered in two specifications, the luxury Statesman de Ville and the basic Statesman Custom. Engine availability for the Custom ranged from a 202-cubic-inch (3.3 L) Red six-cylinder, a 253-cubic-inch (4.1 L) V8 (for marketing purposes, the metric designation given to the 253 V8 was 4.2 L), a 308-cubic-inch (5.0 L) V8 and a 350-cubic-inch (5.7 L) Chevrolet small-block V8. All Statesman de Ville sedans featured the 308 V8 engine as standard equipment, with the 350 V8 an option. Compared to the broad range of Holden sedans, the Statesman sedans featured a wheelbase extended by 3 inches (76 mm), totalling 114 inches (2,900 mm), in common with Holden's range of station wagons. The extra length was incorporated behind the rear doors to allow for additional rear seat legroom.

The Statesman was intended as a rival for Ford Australia's successful Fairlane which had debuted in Australian-designed form as the ZA series in March 1967. The Fairlane had created a new and exclusive category of Australian-made prestige cars. It was derived from the Falcon, with an extended wheelbase and unique front-end and rear-end styling to differentiate the car's appearance. At the time, this category of vehicle proved to be very profitable, in that the sale price was significantly higher than the base car from which the prestige model was derived, and the additional costs of production were only moderate. GM-H went to some length to set the new luxury Statesman marque apart from the Holden models in their sales literature, totally avoiding the presence of the name "Holden", even to the extent of using the term "General Motors" in lieu of "General Motors-Holden". Advertisements in newspapers among other media followed the same format.

=== Overseas markets ===
==== New Zealand ====
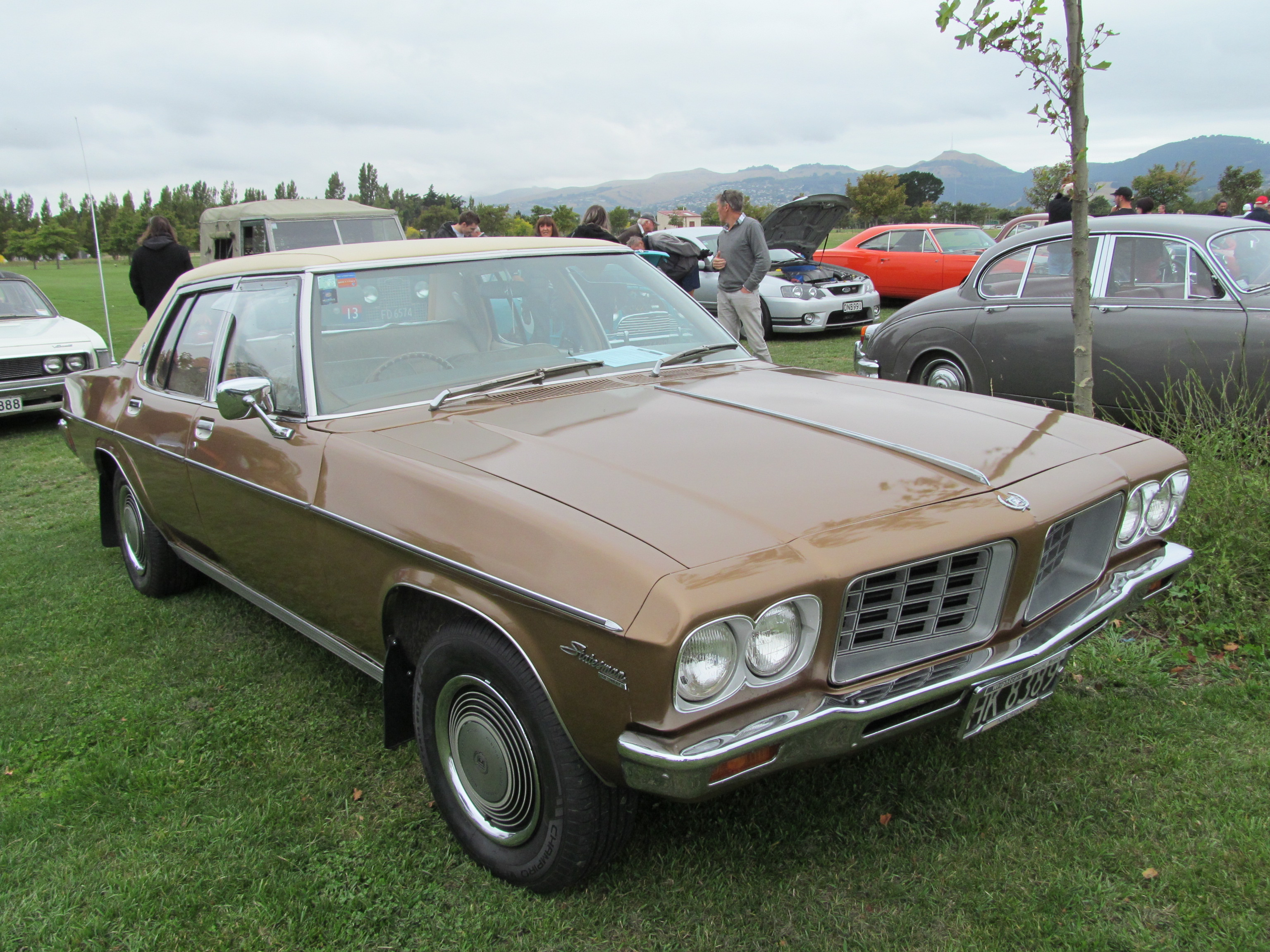
Statesman de Ville (HQ) (New Zealand)

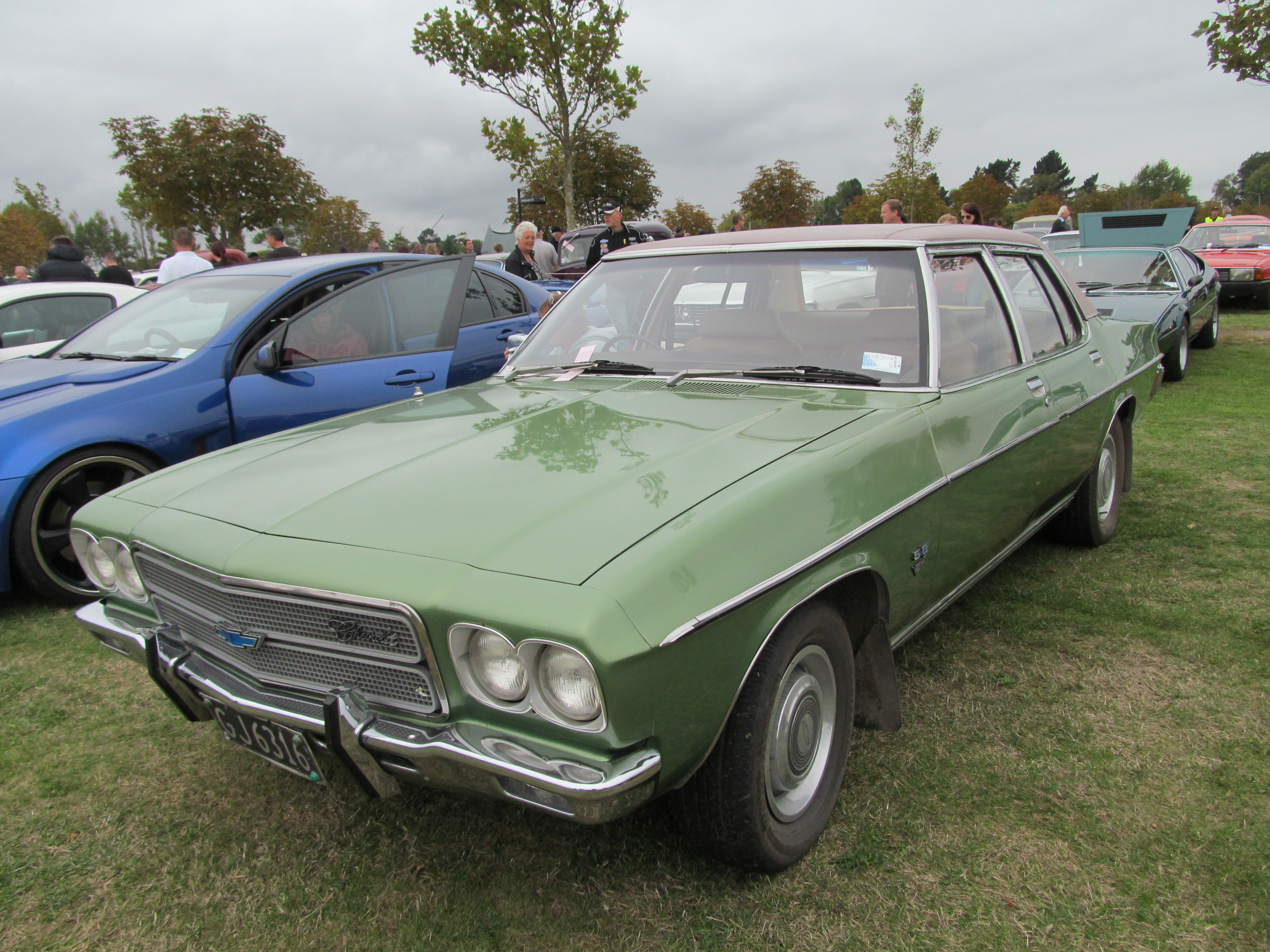
Chevrolet 350 (New Zealand)

General Motors New Zealand assembled the HQ Statesman until 1975, launching it a few months after Belmont and Kingswood assembly began at the Trentham plant, near Upper Hutt in September 1971. Initial build was a single model with 308V8, column-shift Trimatic, white headliner, black vinyl roof and electric windows. The only factory options were metallic paint and vinyl roof delete. Only a bench front seat was available and brocade trim options included white, unique to the Statesman. New exterior and interior colours, plus colour-matched headliners, were introduced in mid-1973 and, a few months later, separate front seats and T-bar floor shift became a factory option though initially the floor console was black, not colour matched to the rest of the interior. While Statesman was its own marque in Australia, in New Zealand it was the model name, marketed as Holden Statesman.

The Statesman was also exported to New Zealand, with a different grille, as the Chevrolet 350. This was in reality an Australian Statesman with the bigger American Chevrolet 350-cubic-inch V8 and badged as a "Chevrolet." Australian-assembled Chevrolet 350s supplemented the locally built cars albeit in low volume. These always had colour-matched interiors and had minor styling differences such as the grille, badging and no decorative inserts in the rear bumper.

Both the Chevrolet 350 and Statesman were sold alongside each other at Holden dealerships.

==== South Africa ====
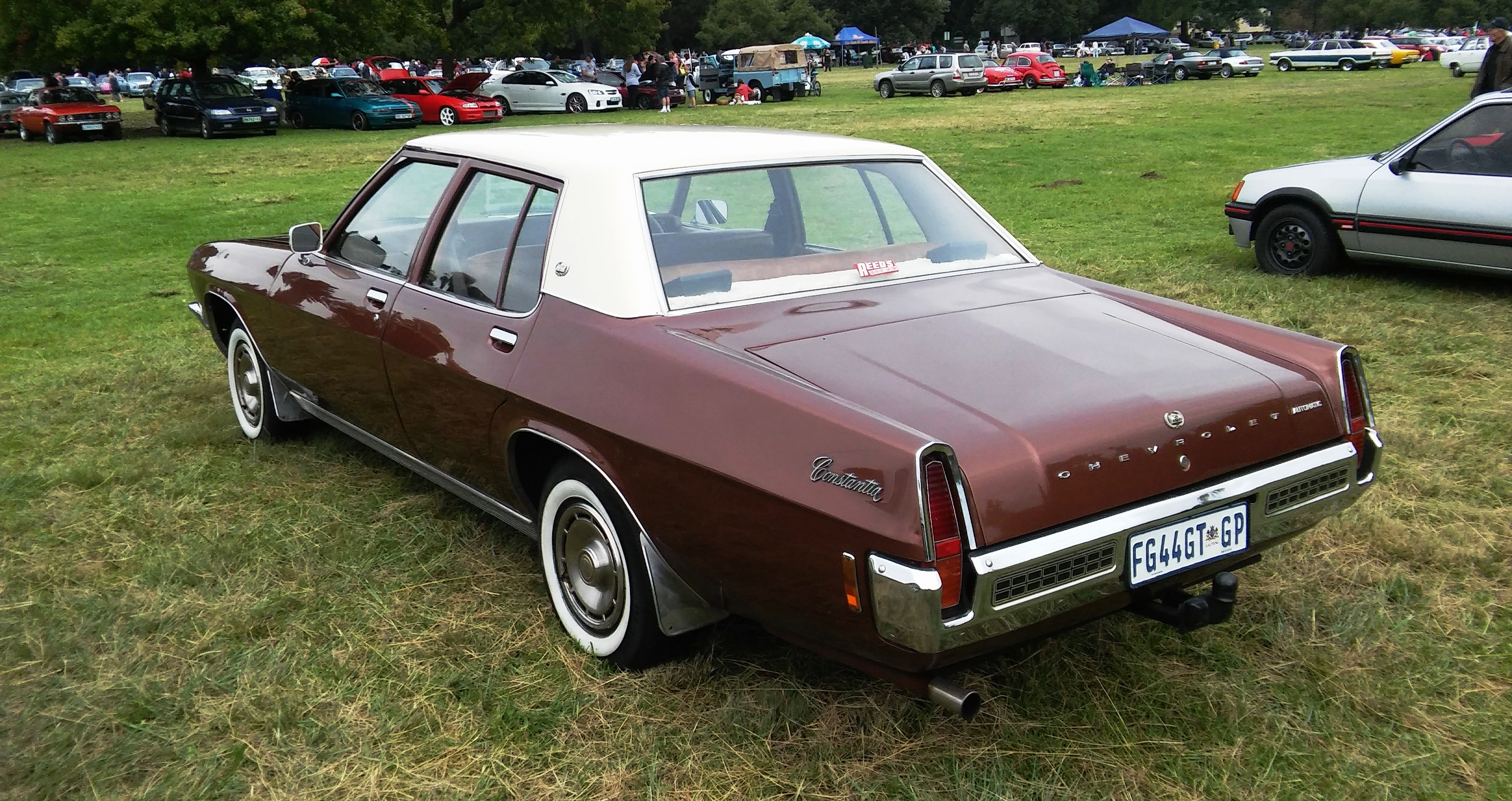
Chevrolet Constantia AQ Series rear view

Statesman HQ models were marketed in South Africa as the AQ Chevrolet Constantia and the Chevrolet de Ville. The Constantia was fitted with an Australian five-litre V8 or locally assembled 4.1-litre inline-six and was considered locally built, although a lot of the components came from Australia in CKD form. The Chevrolet de Ville, however, used an imported 5.7-litre V8 as fitted to the Australian Statesman and was priced 33 percent higher than a comparable Constantia V8.

The de Ville received praise for being considerably nimbler, lighter, more compact and better handling than the American models it replaced, without any loss in accommodation. Power for the 350 V8 was claimed at 205.2 and 174.2 kW (279.0 and 236.8 PS; 275.2 and 233.6 hp), SAE and net figures, respectively.

==== Japan ====
The HQ Statesman was exported to Japan as the Isuzu Statesman De Ville from 1973 to 1976. It featured mirrors installed on the front guards, redesigned wheel covers, and Holden badges. It was powered by a 5.0-litre Holden V8 producing 165 kW (221 hp), paired with a three-speed automatic transmission. Either 246 or 250 units were sold.

==== Thailand ====
HQ Holden models were locally assembled in Thailand from knock-down kits and sold as the Monaro LS (Kingswood) and Chevrolet De Ville (Statesman).

== HJ ==
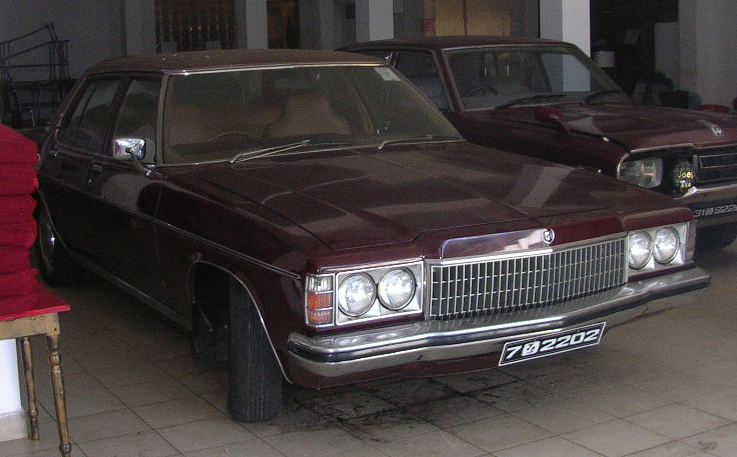
Statesman de Ville (HJ)

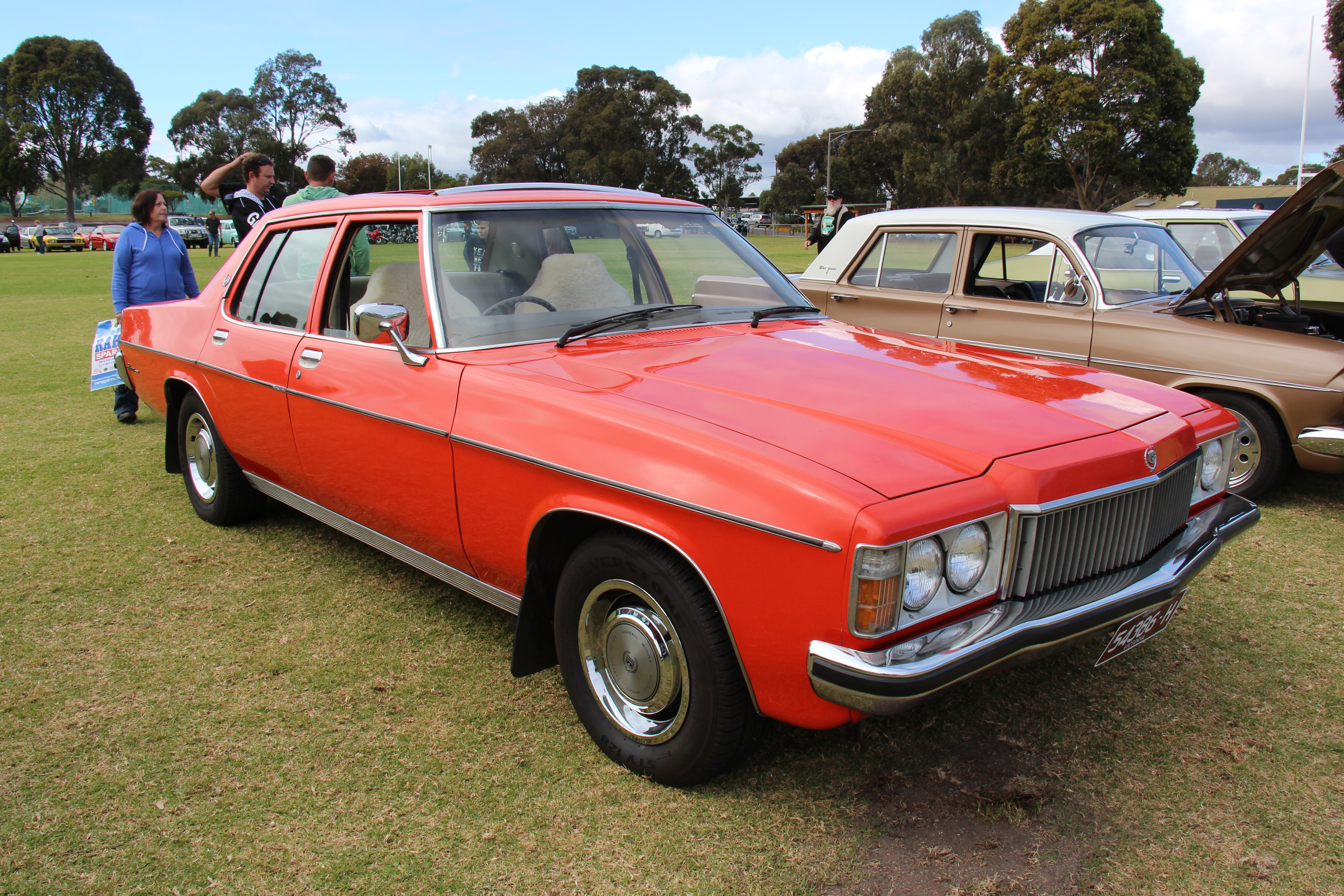
Statesman de Ville (HJ)

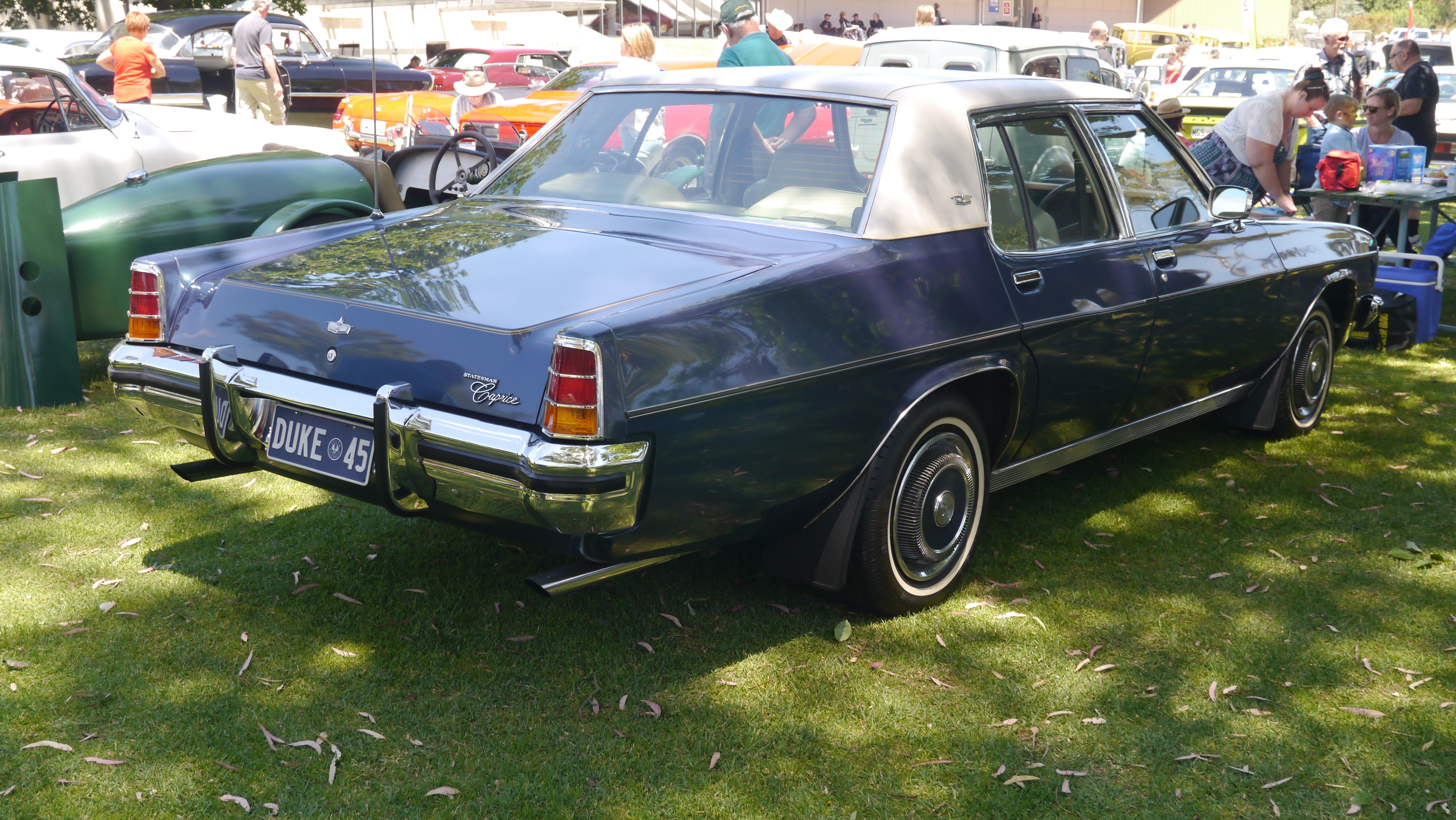
Statesman Caprice (HJ)

Holden updated the range in October 1974 to create the Statesman HJ, retaining the Statesman de Ville whilst creating a new flagship in the Statesman Caprice, replete with standard luxury features such as air conditioning and leather seating. Statesman Custom was discontinued with the HJ series and engine availability was restricted to the 308-cubic-inch (5.0 L) V8 engine. Statesman Caprice was the most luxurious car offered by General Motors in Australia at that point, with air conditioning, leather seats, electric locking, power windows, and no fewer than 13 interior lamps all featuring on the standard equipment list.

The Caprice was visually distinctive, with a specific radiator grille, Cadillac-style front bumper overriders, lavish fluted hubcaps, whitewall tyres, and a bonnet ornament borrowed from the Chevrolet Caprice.

Once again, the Caprice was Holden's response to a new Ford car. In 1973, Ford upped the ante in the Australian prestige car stakes when they unveiled the LTD. This was a Fairlane which had the wheelbase extended again – to 121 inches (3,100 mm) – making it the only Australian car which fitted into the US full-size category. The LTD was a significant success for Ford, both in terms of sales and profits, as well as making a statement regarding their prowess as a manufacturer.

From March 1976, late in the HJ series, an electromechanical rear drum anti-lock braking system (ABS) was made available on the Caprice. This system, a Delco-Moraine unit, carried over to the subsequent Statesman HX models, but after the introduction of rear disc brakes on the Statesman HZ series, ABS was not seen on another Statesman or Holden model until the Holden Calibra coupe and Holden VQ Caprice in 1991. This new ABS system was the electronic Bosch patent system operating on all four-wheel discs.

=== New Zealand ===
With the exception of the HJ Monaro, the entire HJ Series were built by General Motors New Zealand at the Trentham plant in Wellington. The Monaro was fully imported. Again the HJ Statesman was marketed as Holden Statesman.

=== South Africa ===
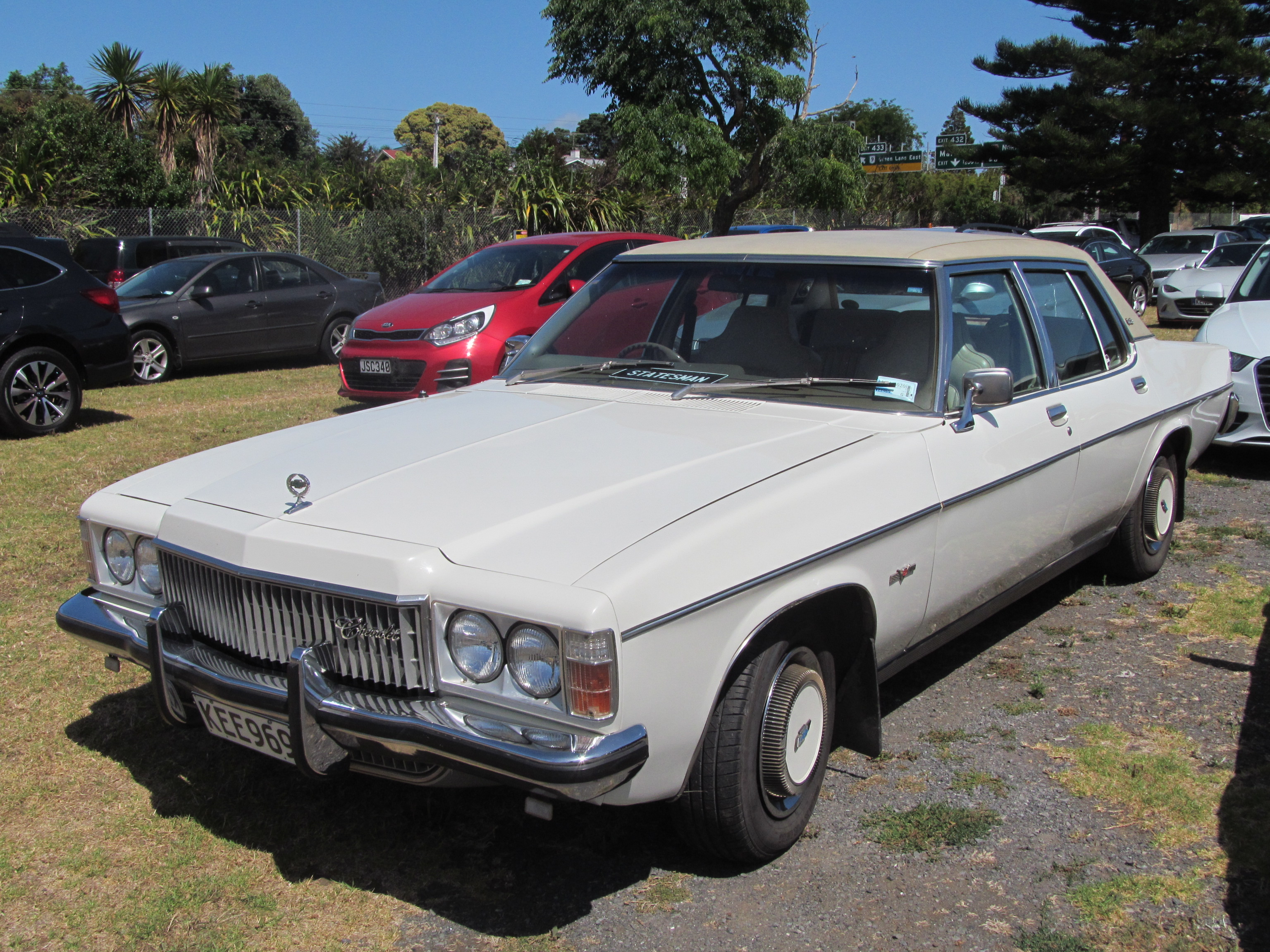
1976 Chevrolet Caprice Classic (South Africa)

HJ Statesman de Ville and the HJ Statesman Caprices were sold in South Africa as the AJ series Chevrolet Constantia sedan and the Chevrolet Caprice Classic, respectively. The AJ series was marketed from 1975 to 1978. It was offered as a four-door sedan and as a five-door wagon. Engine options were a 4.1-litre six and a 5.0-litre V8.

== HX ==
The Statesman HX de Ville and Caprice models were released in July 1976. A more formal grille was adopted and emissions regulations saw a retuned 5.0-litre V8.

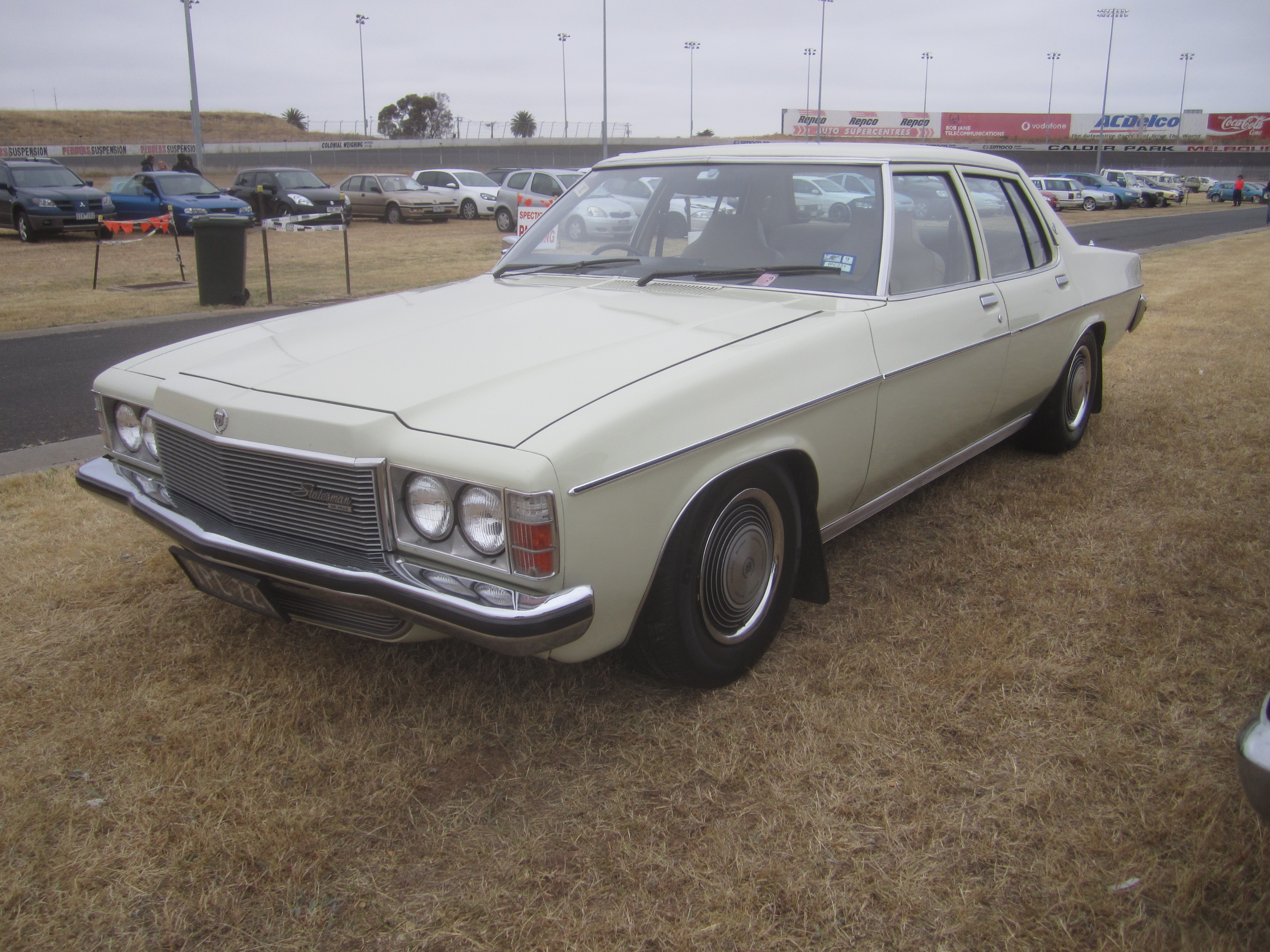
Statesman de Ville (HX)

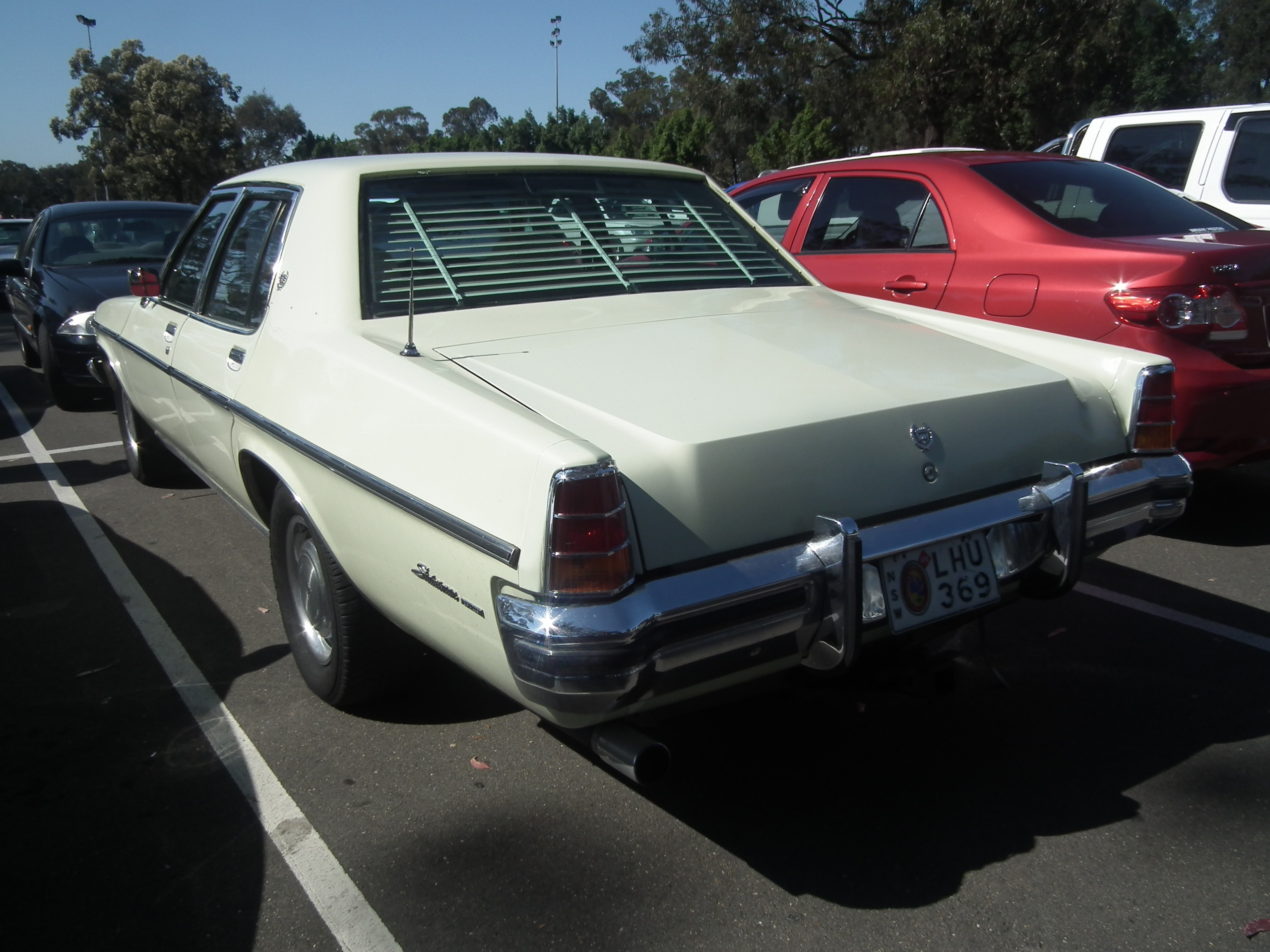
Statesman de Ville (HX)

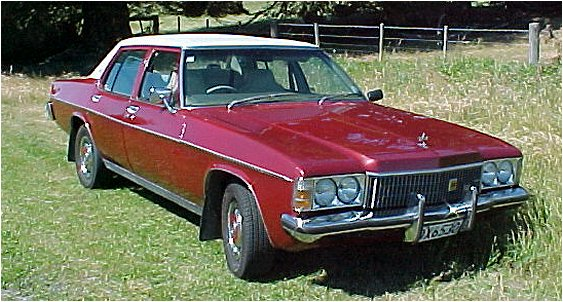
Statesman Caprice (HX)

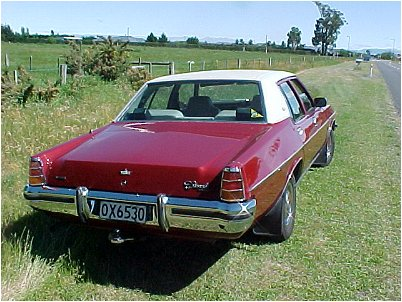
Statesman Caprice (HX)

== HZ ==
In November 1977, Holden introduced the Statesman HZ, which involved a minor cosmetic facelift. However, it had a significant engineering upgrade, along with the rest of the Holden range, involving the adoption of Radial Tuned Suspension, giving the Statesman better handling. 4-wheel disc brakes were now fitted to all Statesman models.

The previous Director of Holden Engineering, George Roberts had insisted that the Statesman have a high standard of ride comfort (at the expense of ultimate roadholding). (Roberts previously had been the Chief Engineer of the GM Cadillac Division). Prior to HZ, the Statesman's Cadillac style of ride was not to everyone's taste.

The Statesman de Ville and Caprice were supplemented in 1979 by an intermediate model – the SL/E, which was launched with a different "eggcrate" grille.

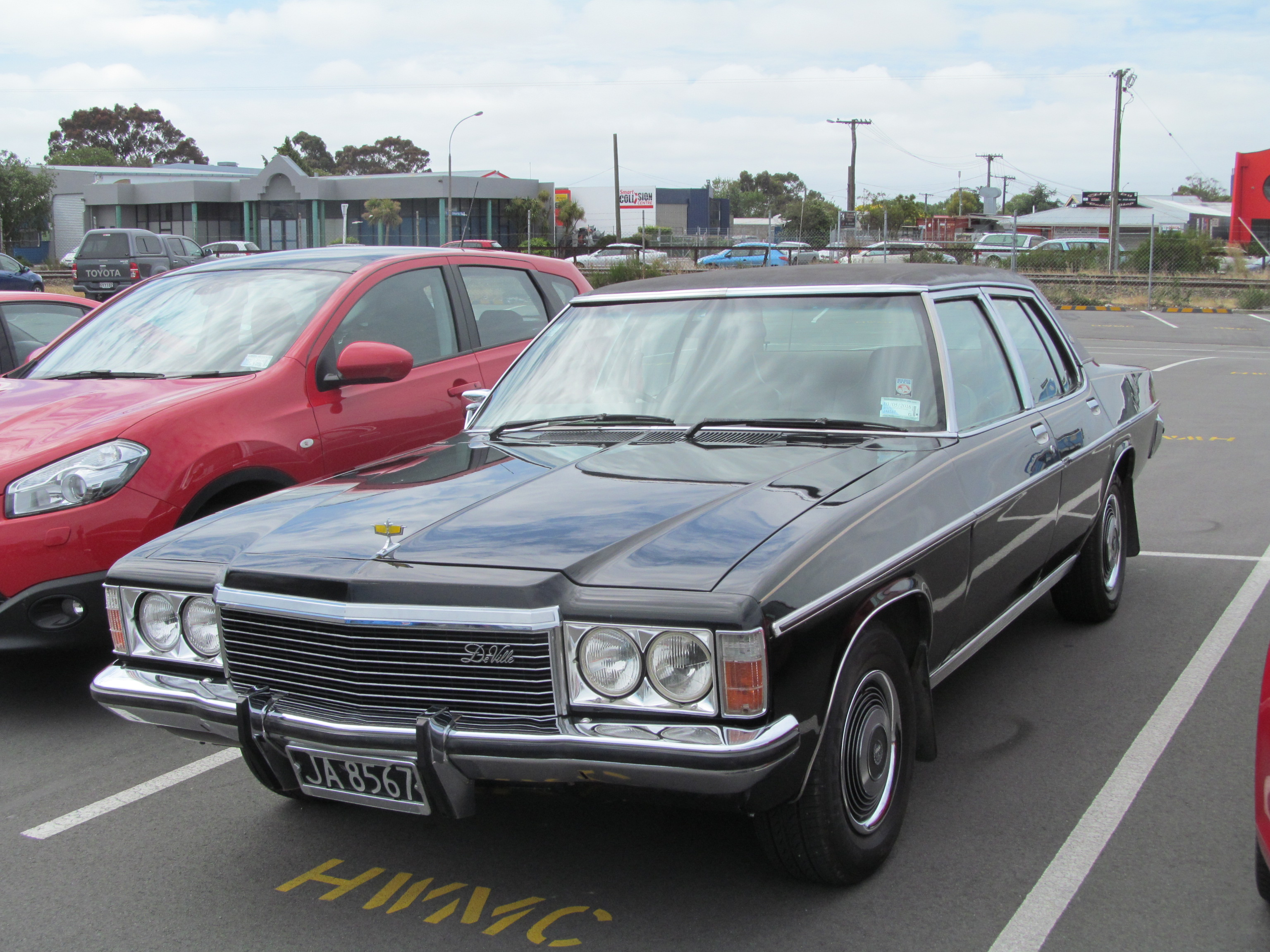
Statesman de Ville (HZ)

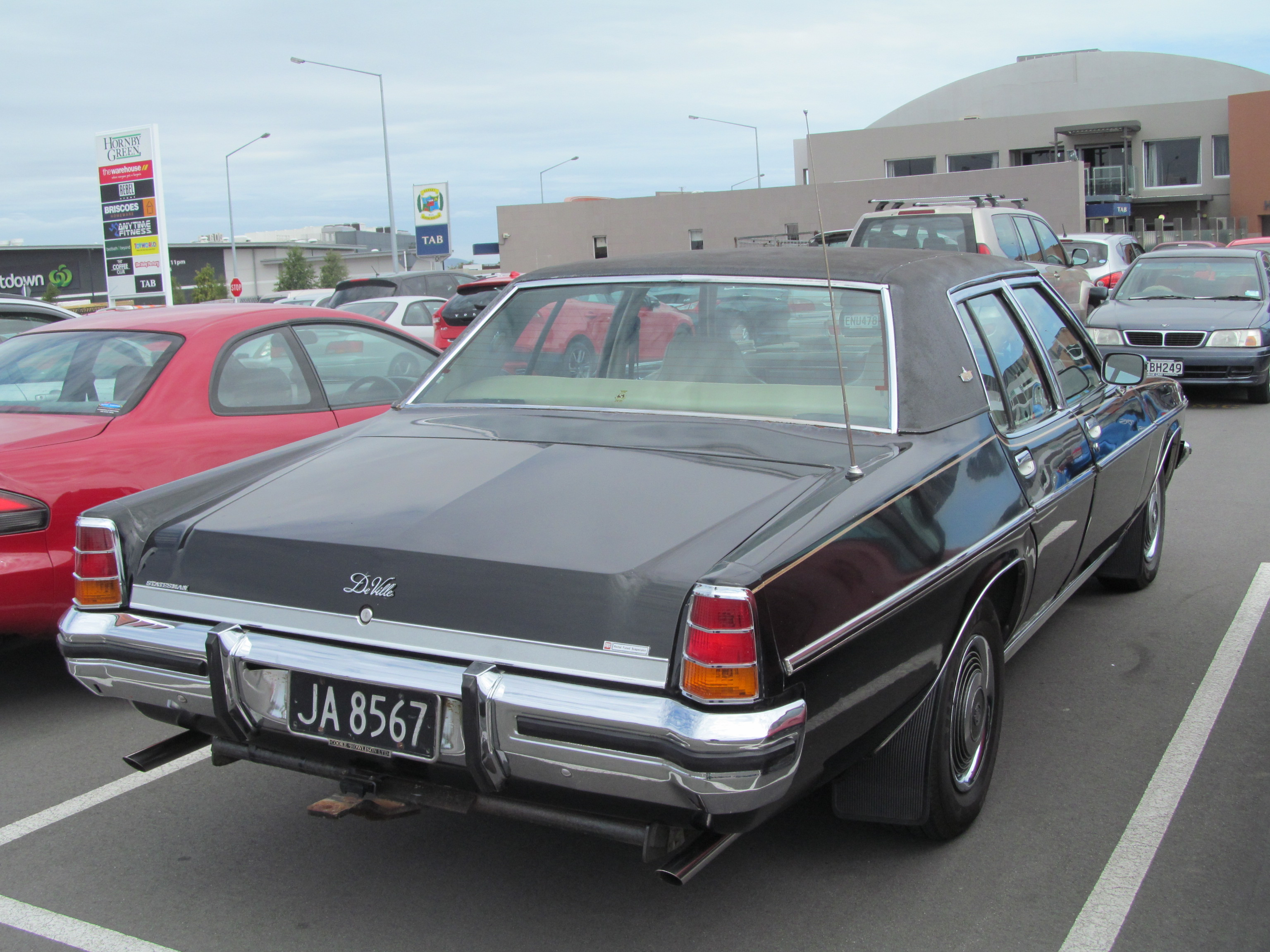
Statesman de Ville (HZ)

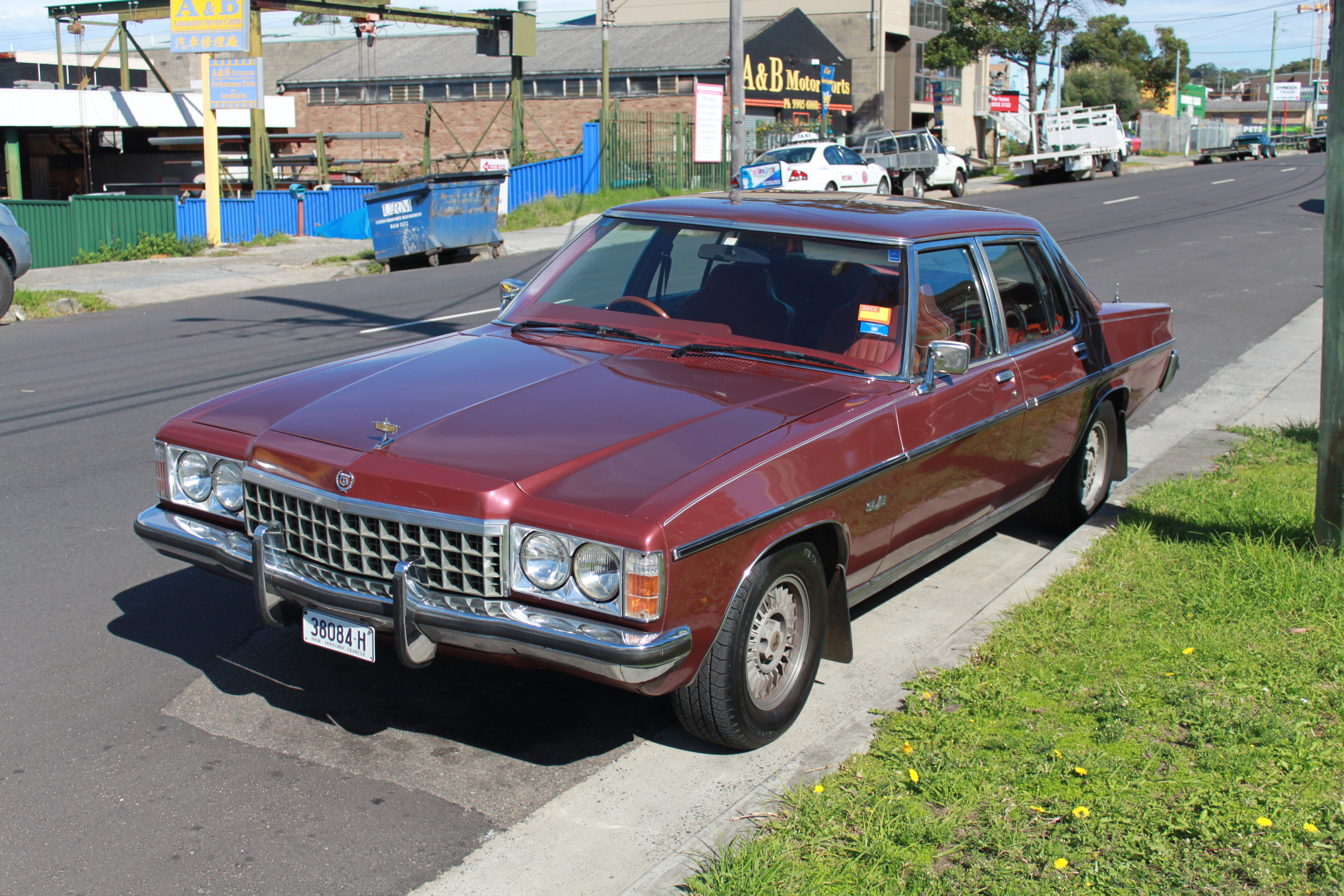
Statesman SL/E (HZ)

== WB ==
The final series to be marketed under the Statesman marque was the Statesman WB. Released in May 1980, the WB series was offered in Statesman De Ville and Statesman Caprice models. As with previous Statesmans, the Holden name was not used in the badging or the official sales literature. The WB had a six-light body, with a longer, squared-off roofline. The design was by Chief Stylist, Leo Pruneau. The styling of the WB Statesman was a compromise between achieving a fresh appearance and minimising the cost of redesign, by using panels from the existing base HZ model. Production comprised 5,450 De Villes and 3,055 Caprices.

WB Series II models were released in September 1983 with fundamentally cosmetic changes, except for the introduction of a front bench seat (six-passenger) option for De Ville buyers. In 1985 Holden announced that it intended to vacate the big-car market to concentrate on production of luxury versions of the Holden Commodore. Series II production comprised 4,269 De Villes and 1,153 Caprices.

In addition to the Statesman WB, a range of Holden WB passenger vehicles were prototyped along the lines of pre-existing HZ series vehicles, but only the commercial models (ute, panel van and cab-chassis "One Tonner") actually went into production from 1980 through 1985.

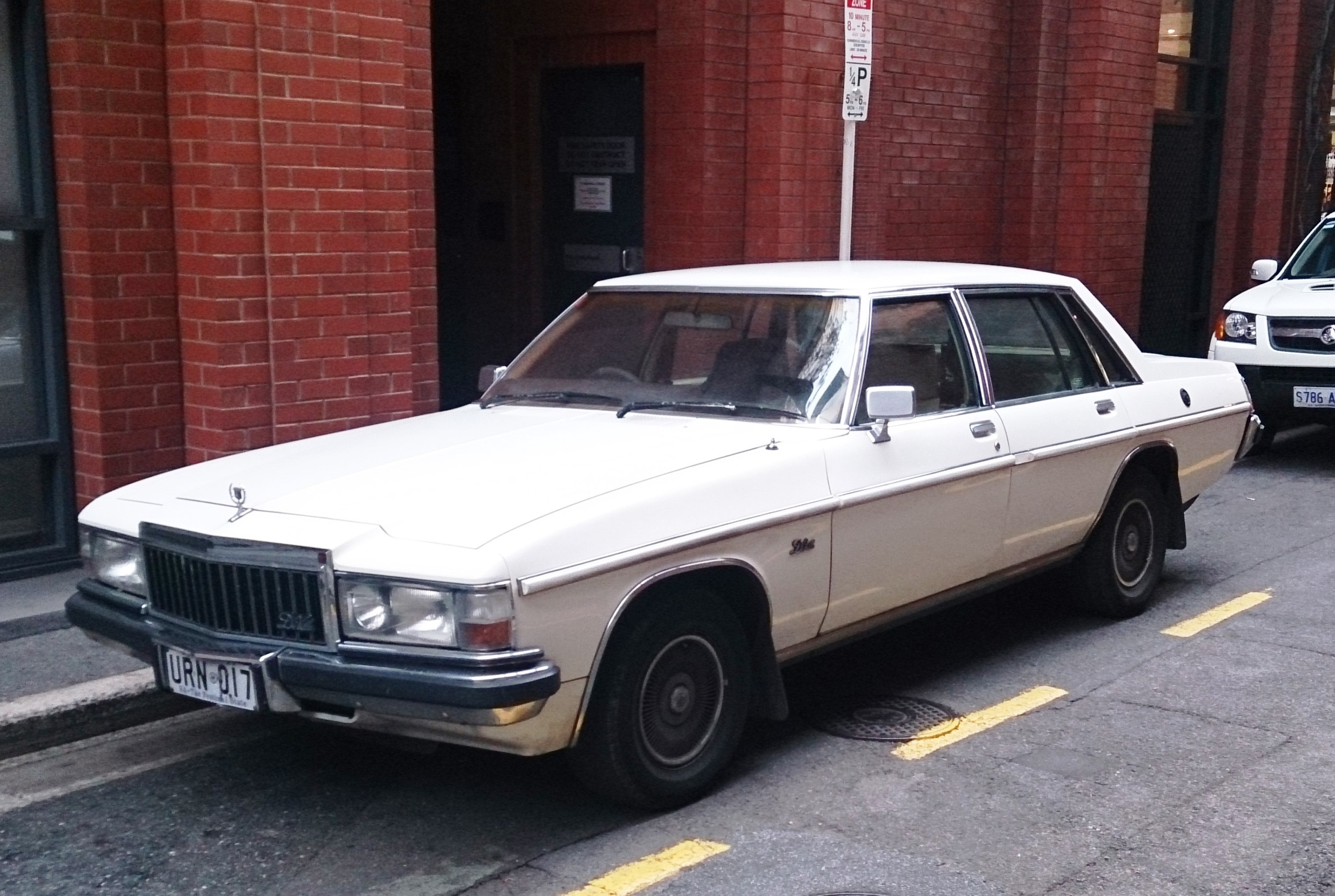
Statesman De Ville (WB Series I)

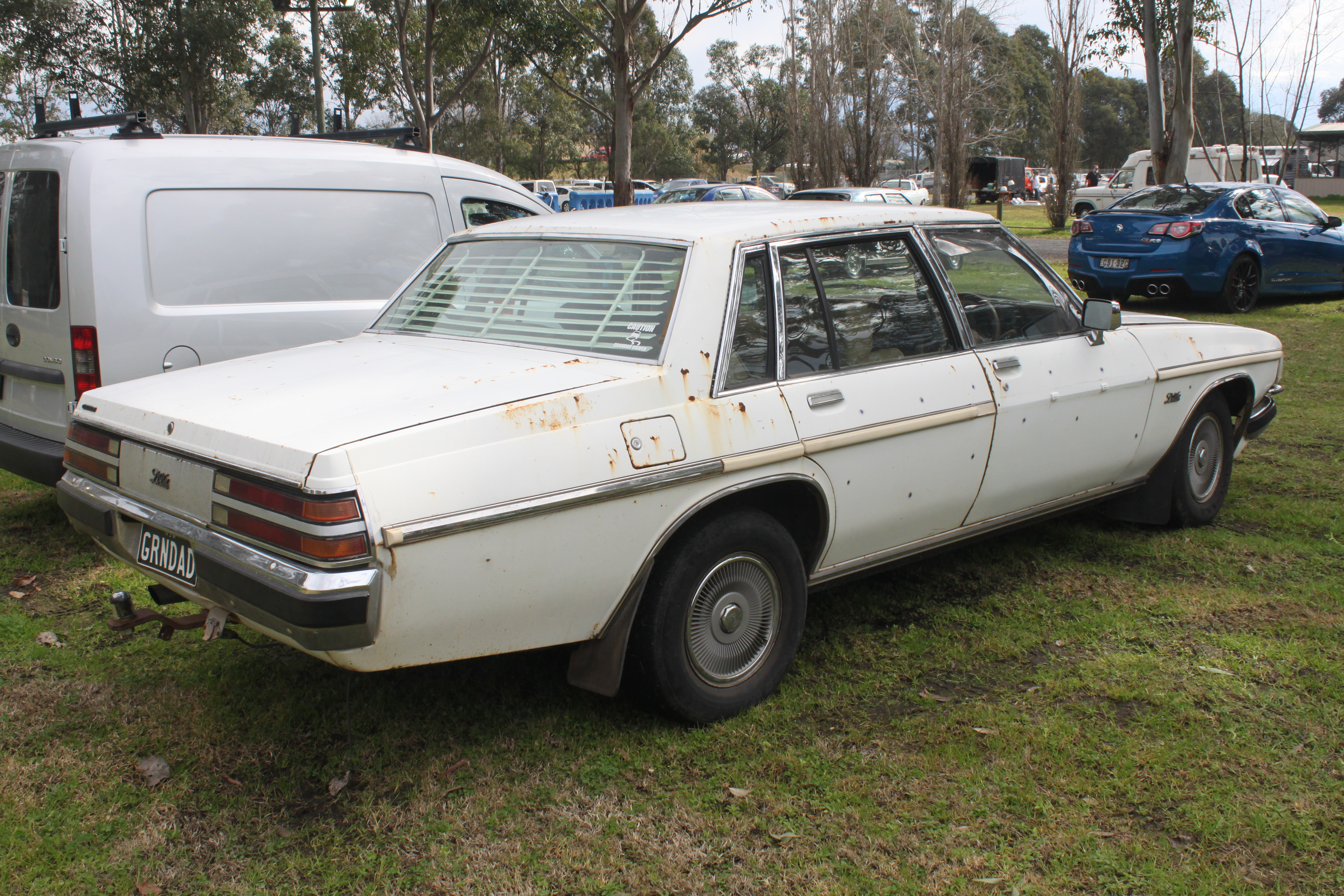
Statesman de Ville (WB Series I)

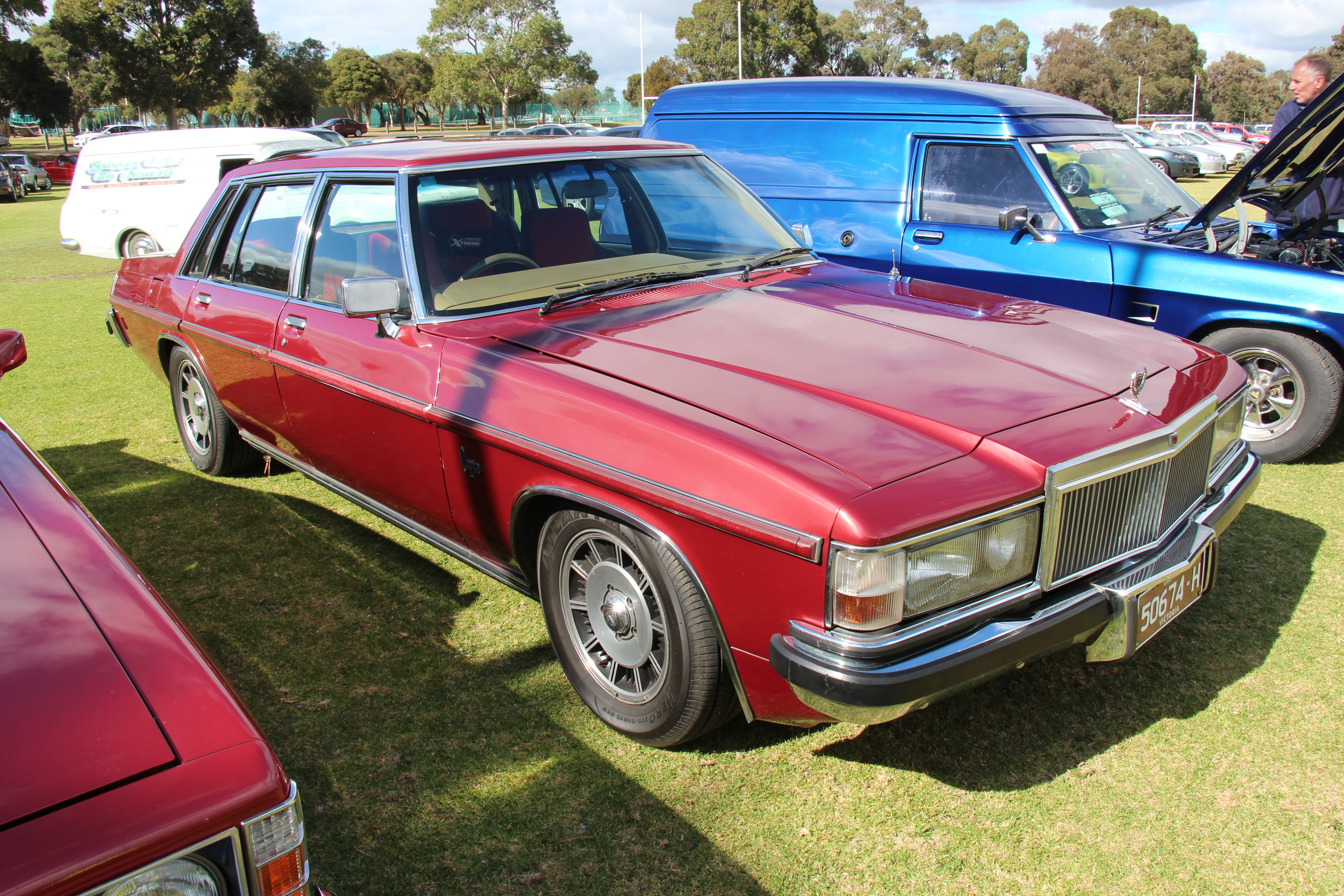
Statesman Caprice (WB Series I)

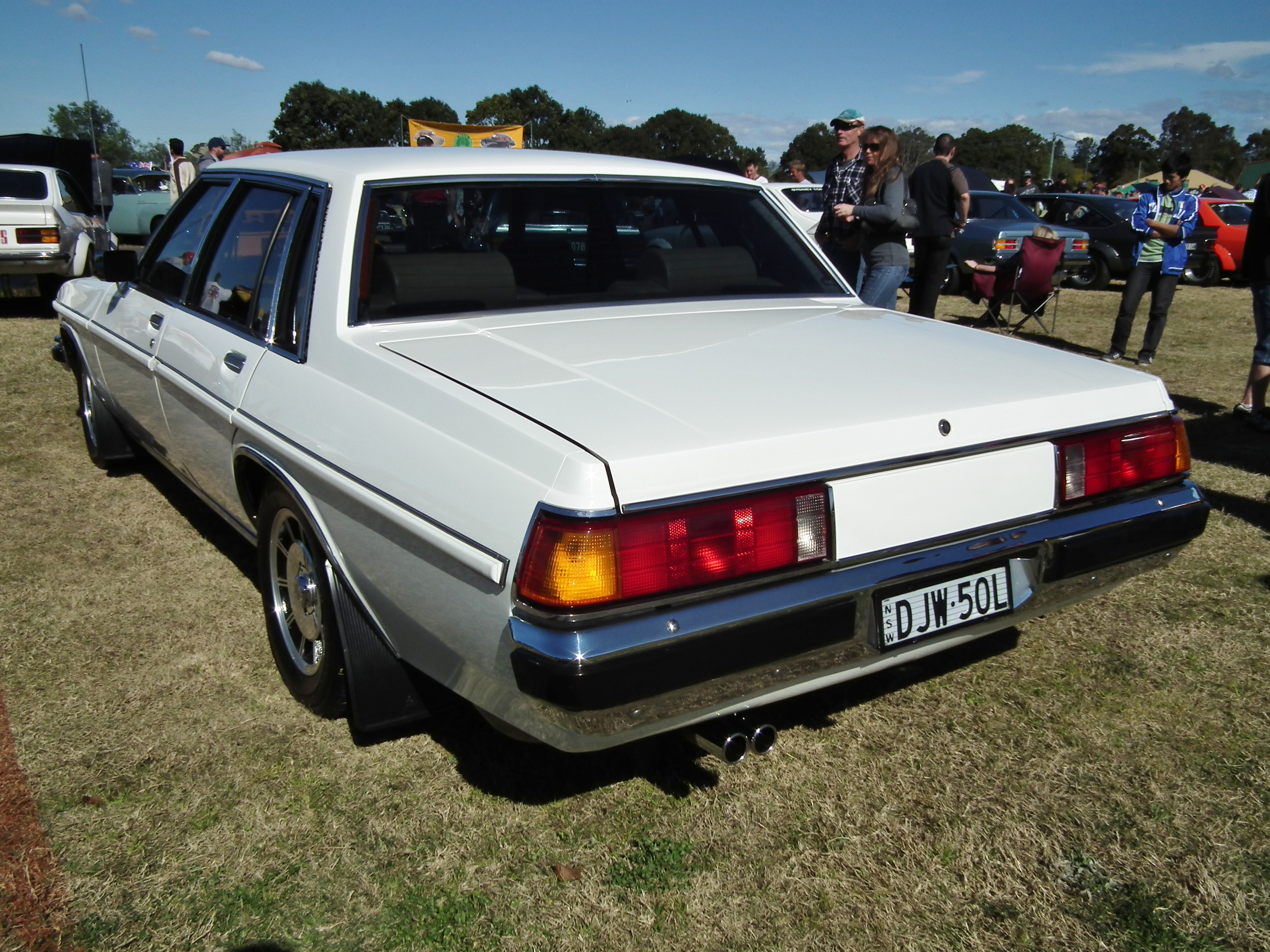
Statesman Caprice (WB Series I)

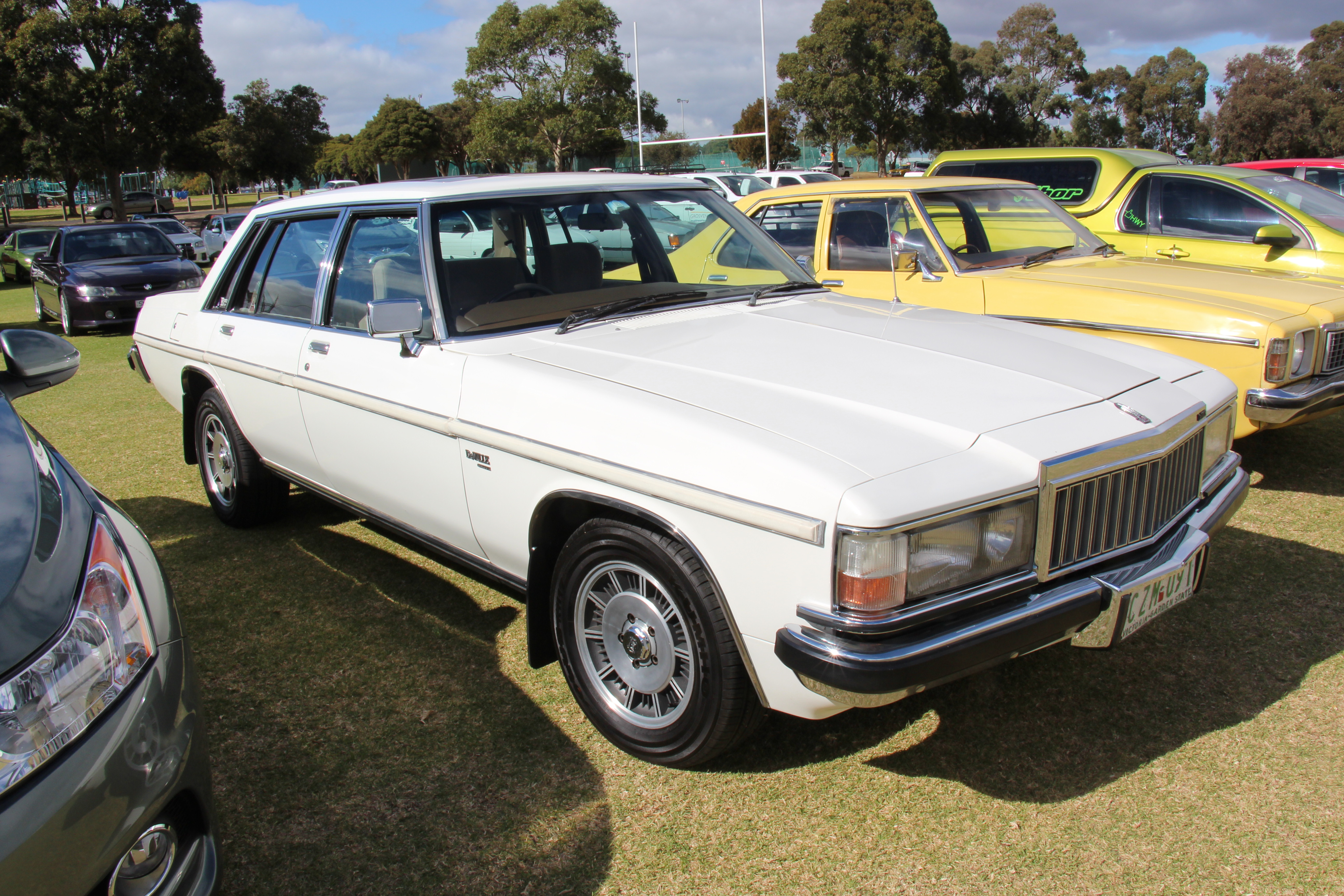
Statesman De Ville (WB Series II)

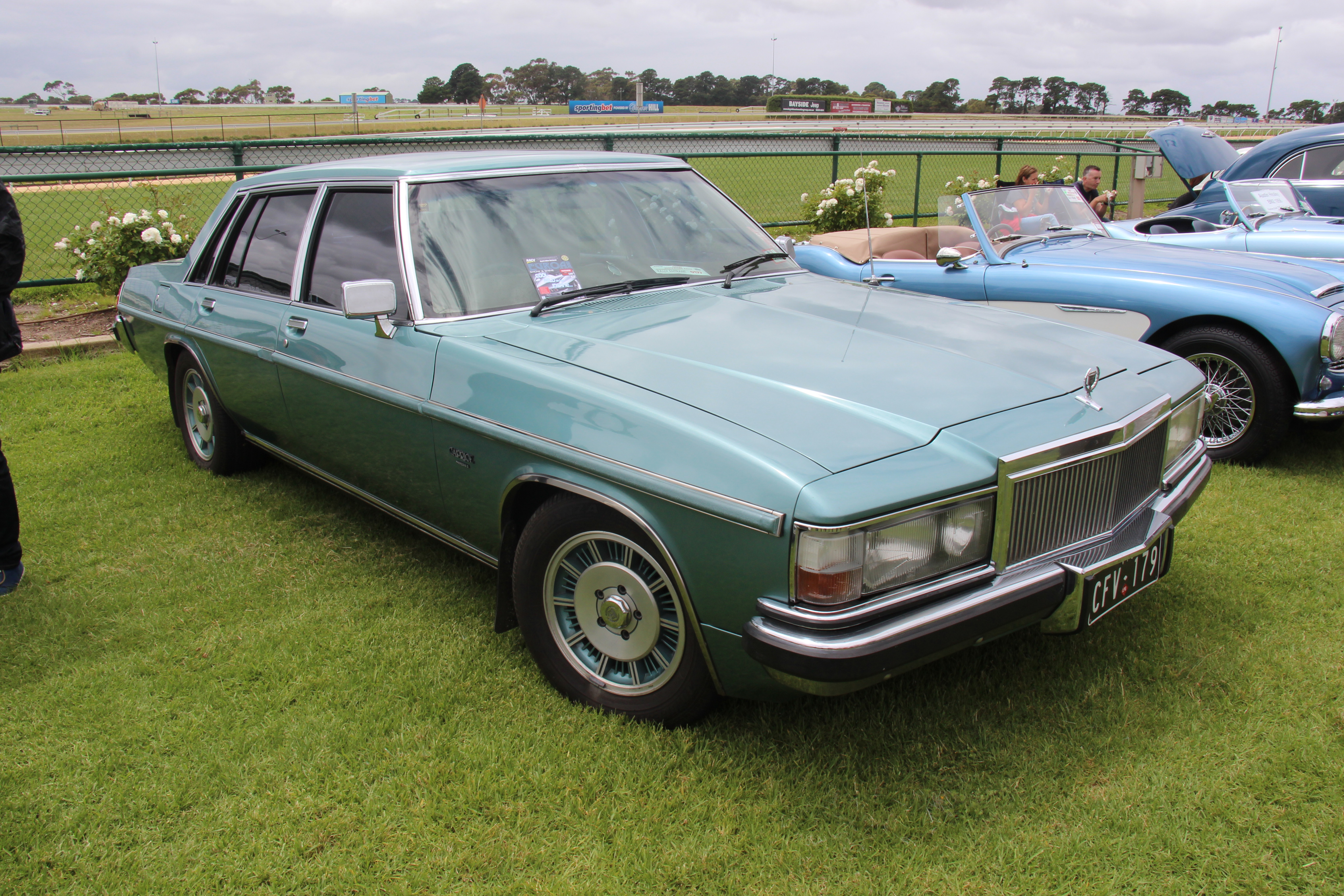
Statesman Caprice (WB Series II)

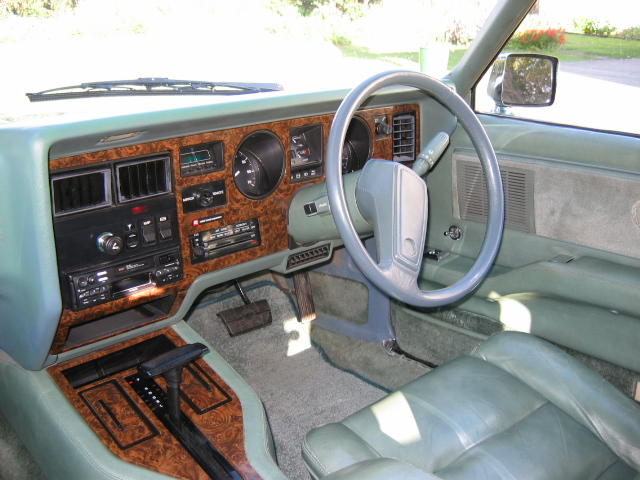
Interior of a 1983 Statesman Caprice
