= Chevrolet Constantia =

Car sold in South Africa from 1969–1978

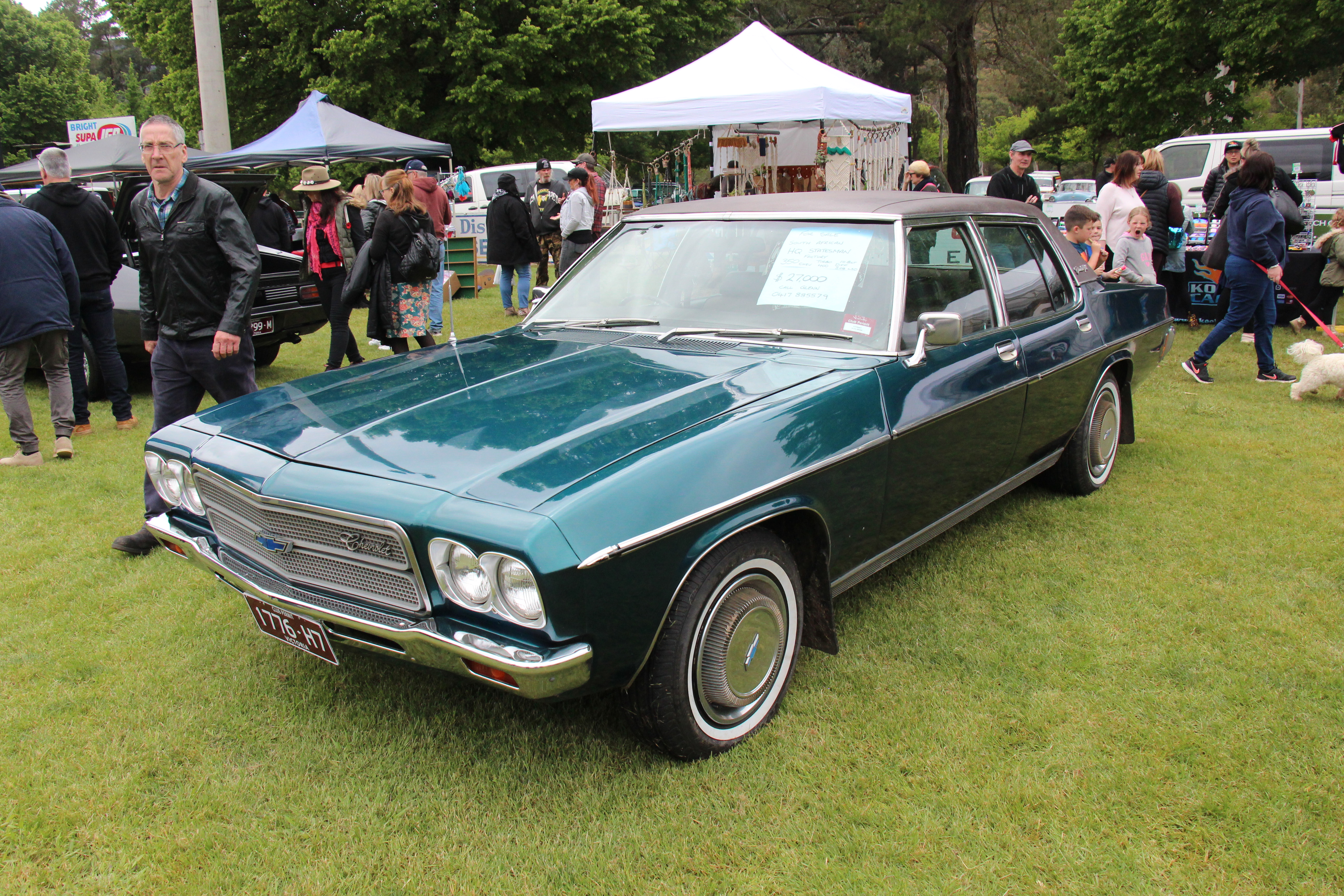
- 1972 Chevrolet Constantia AQ

Overview
- Manufacturer: Holden (General Motors)
- Also called: Chevrolet Caprice Classic; Chevrolet de Ville
- Production: May 1969–1978
- Assembly: South Africa: Port Elizabeth (GMSA)
- Designer: Leo Pruneau

Body and chassis
- Class: Full-size luxury car
- Body style: 4-door sedan
- Platform: Holden HQ (AQ & AJ)
- Related: Holden Brougham; Holden Statesman (AQ & AJ)

Powertrain
- Engine: 250 cu in (4.1 L) I6; 308 cu in (5.0 L) V8

The Chevrolet Constantia is an automobile which was marketed by Chevrolet in South Africa from 1969 to 1978, as a rebadged Holden Brougham and later Statesman.

== First series ==
Chevrolet Constantia AJ (front view).

The first series Chevrolet Constantia went on sale in May 1969, along with the lower priced Kommando. It was based on the Australian Holden Brougham four-door sedan, but featured a unique frontal treatment. The styling changes were undertaken in General Motors' Port Elizabeth studios in South Africa and the model was locally produced. The Constantia was offered with a 4.1 litre six and a 5.0 litre V8. 843 were sold in 1969 followed by 750 in 1970 and 800 in 1971.

== AQ series ==
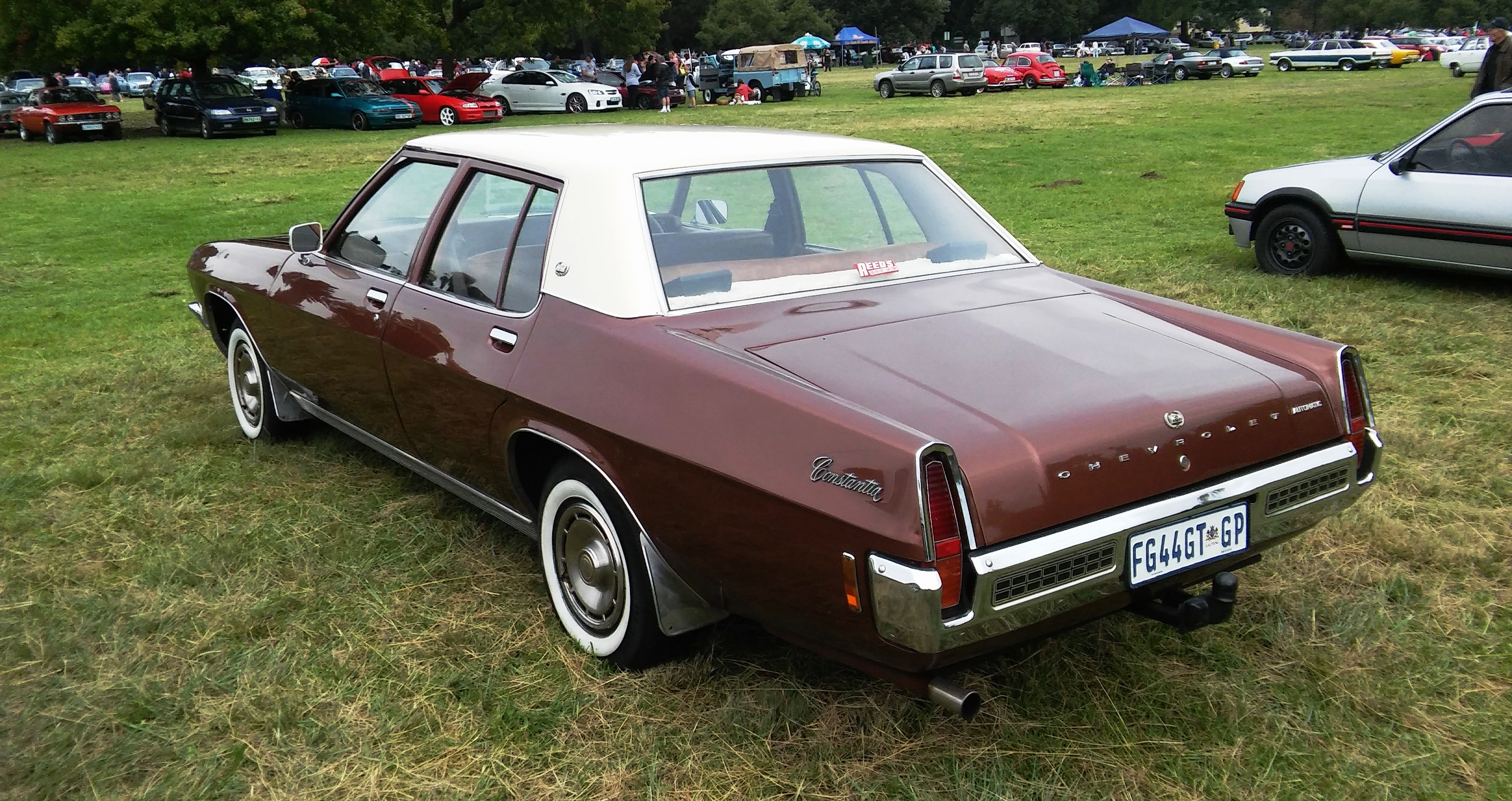
Chevrolet Constantia AQ Series (rear view)

The AQ series Constantia was introduced in 1972 and was based on another Australian design, the Statesman HQ. Again, frontal styling was different from the Australian model, this time featuring a unique grille based on the 1970 Chevrolet Malibu. The restyling work was a joint effort undertaken in Australia. The AQ Series Constantia was offered with a 4.1-litre six and a 5.0-litre V8. Wheel covers came from the 1971–72 North American Chevelle Malibu.

== AJ series ==
The revised AJ series Constantia was marketed in South Africa from 1975 to 1978. It was offered as a four-door sedan, based on the Statesman HJ and as a five-door wagon, based on the Holden HJ wagon. The AJ Series was offered with a 4.1-litre six and a 5.0-litre V8. A more luxurious version was sold as the Chevrolet Caprice Classic.

== Sales ==
These are the South African official sales numbers.

Year	1969	1970	1971	1972	1973	1974	1975	1976	1977	1978
1st series	843	750	800	?						
AQ				?	1919	1167	?			
AJ							?	1149	690	173
Caprice Classic							135	306	197	222
