= Isuzu Faster =

Pickup truck

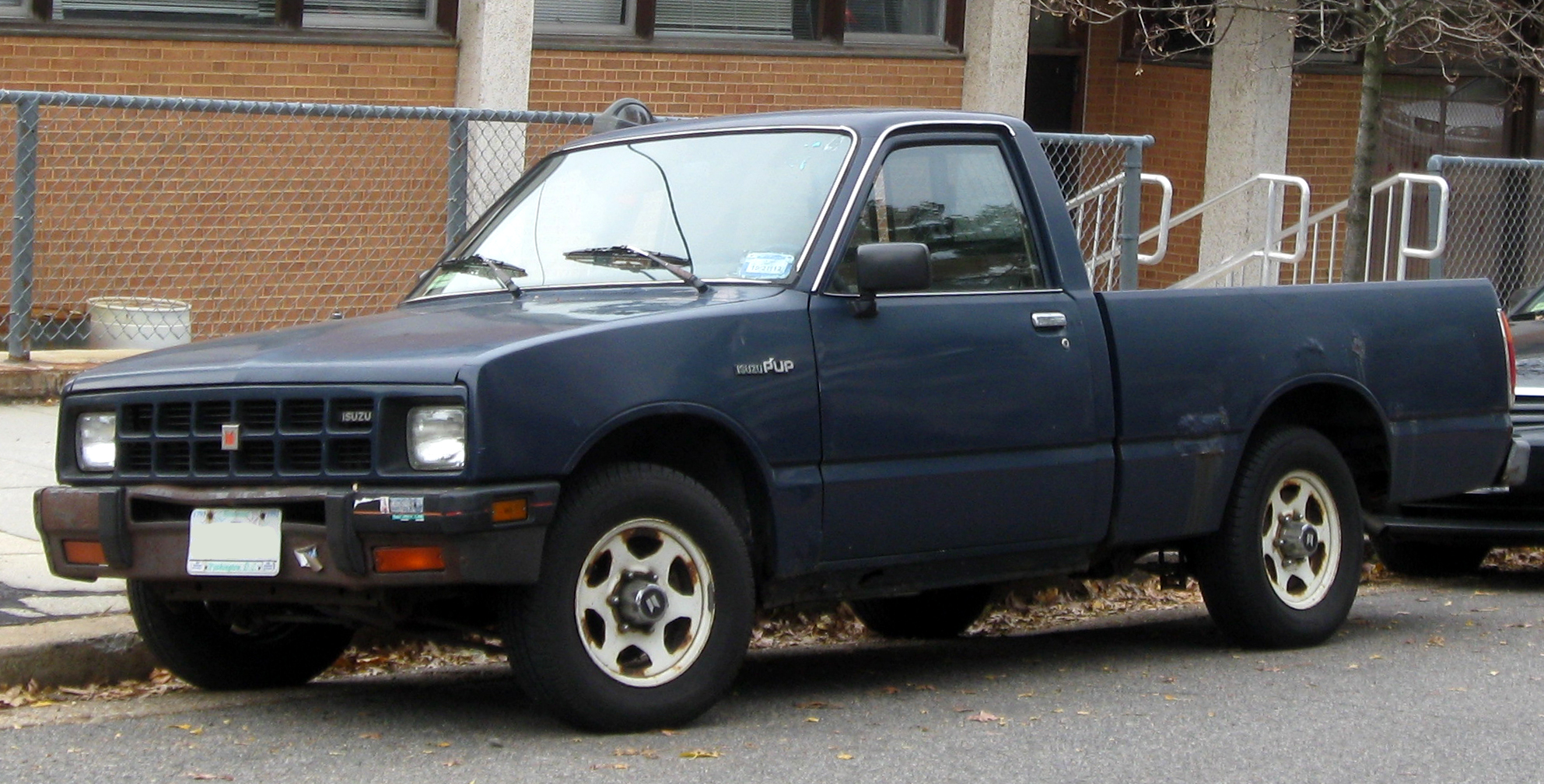
- Second generation Isuzu P'up (U.S.)

Overview
- Manufacturer: Isuzu
- Also called: Chevrolet LUV
- Production: 1972–2002

Body and chassis
- Class: Compact pickup truck
- Layout: Front-engine, rear-wheel drive Front-engine, four-wheel drive

Chronology
- Predecessor: Isuzu Wasp; Holden WB (for Australia, since 1984)
- Successor: Isuzu D-Max; Isuzu Hombre (North America)

The Isuzu Faster is a compact pickup truck that was manufactured and marketed by Isuzu between 1972 and 2002 over three generations. It was sold under myriad nameplates. Most commonly, they were marketed under their respective model codes: Isuzu KB for the first and second generations, TF for the third. In Japan, the "Faster" name was eventually supplanted by Rodeo. It was also marketed under a number of other brands from the General Motors portfolio. The Faster was succeeded worldwide by Isuzu D-Max, except in Japan and North America.

== First generation (1972) ==
First generation
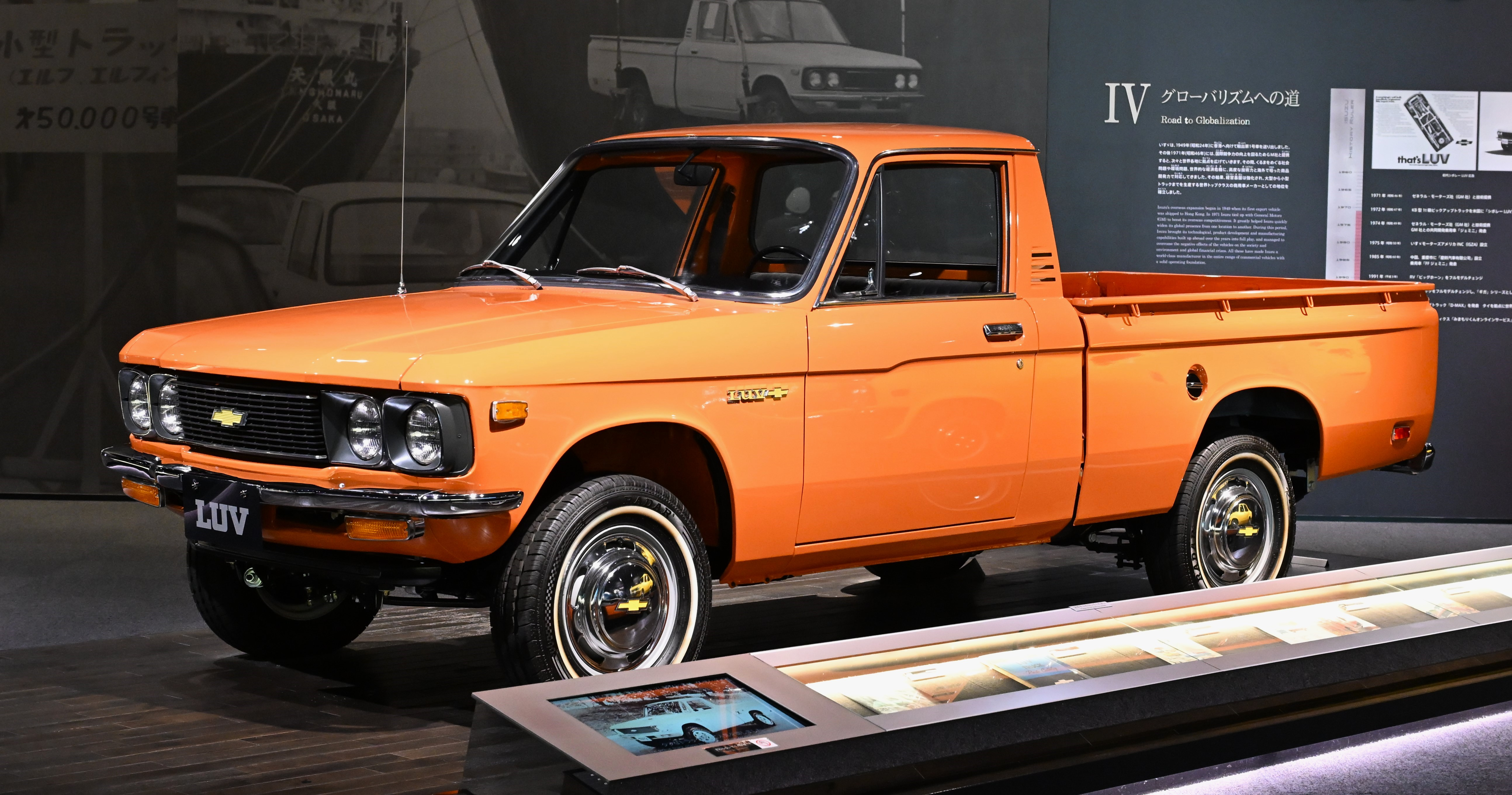
- 1972 Chevrolet LUV 2-door pickup (US)

Overview
- Also called: Isuzu Faster (Thailand); Isuzu KB; Bedford KB; Chevrolet LUV
- Production: 1972–1980
- Assembly: Japan: Fujisawa, Kanagawa (Fujisawa Plant); Thailand: Samrong, Samut Prakan; Indonesia: Bekasi, West Java; Philippines: Dasmariñas (Pilipinas GM)

Body and chassis
- Body style: 2-door cab chassis 2-door pickup truck 4-door pickup truck
- Related: Isuzu Florian

Powertrain
- Engine: 1.6 L G161 OHV I4 (gasoline); 1.6 L G161Z I4 (gasoline); 1.8 L G180Z I4 (gasoline); 2.0 L C190 I4 (diesel)
- Transmission: 4-speed manual; 3-speed automatic

Dimensions
- Wheelbase: 2,600 mm (102.4 in) (SWB); 2,995 mm (117.9 in) (LWB)
- Length: 4,405 mm (173.4 in) (SWB)
- Width: 1,600 mm (63.0 in)
- Curb weight: 1,099–1,290 kg (2,423–2,844 lb)

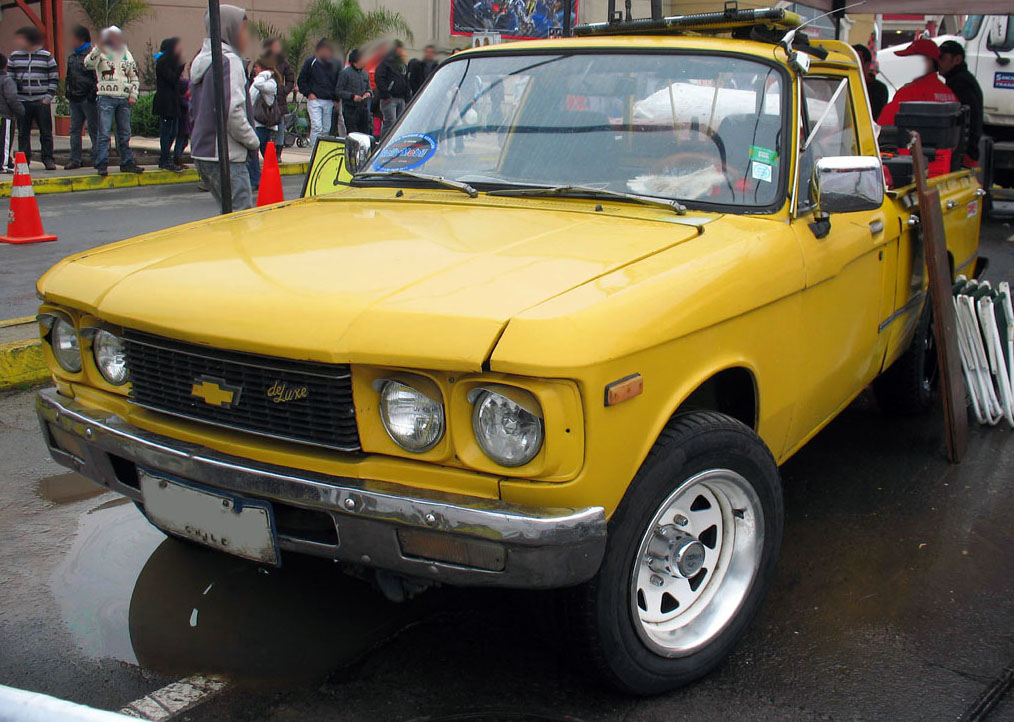
1980 Chevrolet LUV 2-door pickup (Chile)

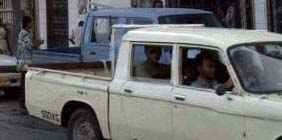
Double cab (4-door pickup) using Isuzu Florian rear doors

Isuzu of Japan introduced the KB20 / 25 series Faster pickup in 1972. The regular wheelbase models were designated "20", while "25" referred to the longer version. Derived from the Isuzu Florian, the Faster shared many components, including doors and the front-end assemblage. It served as a replacement for the Isuzu Wasp, a pickup version of the Bellett which preceded the Florian. Both single and twin headlamp front fascia designs were produced.

Due to the exterior dimensions, and engines offered were found to be in compliance with Japanese regulations, the platform was classed in the favorable "compact" designation, and competed with other Japanese made products sold in Japan at the time.

In most export markets, Isuzu rebranded the Faster as the "Isuzu KB". However, the Faster was often distributed through General Motors (GM) retail channels and sold under the Chevrolet brand as the "Chevrolet LUV"—LUV being an acronym for light utility vehicle. Bedford, the European commercial vehicle subsidiary of GM also offered the vehicle under the "Bedford KB" name.

The Isuzu Faster used a traditional pickup truck chassis with a ladder frame and a leaf spring live axle rear suspension. At the front, the A-arm suspension used an independent configuration. The 2,600 mm (102.4 in) wheelbase was similar to its competitors, as was the 1,855 mm (73.0 in) cargo bay. Unlike for the preceding Wasp, there was also a long wheelbase version (KB25) which had 2,995 mm (117.9 in) between the axles, which made for a 2,290 mm (90.2 in) bed.

In 1978, a four-wheel drive version became available, with the KB40 chassis code but sold under the "Faster Rodeo" label in Japan. There was also a double cab (on the longer chassis) version. Sales ended in 1980 when the second generation was introduced. The engine used in most markets was a carbureted 1.6-liter (1,584 cc) gasoline SOHC inline-four of 94 PS (69 kW), which was complemented by a 2.0-liter (1,951 cc) diesel four (KBD) which produced 62 PS (46 kW). Top speeds were 145 km/h (90 mph) and 115 km/h (71 mph) for the gasoline and diesel versions respectively. In Japan, an overhead valve engine (G161) was fitted originally; this produces 84 PS (62 kW) for a 135 km/h (84 mph) top speed.

Australia

General Motors-Holden imported the Faster into Australia from November 1972 under the name "Chevrolet LUV", renaming it "Isuzu KB" in 1977 before it was replaced in December 1980 by the second generation model (badged "Holden Rodeo"). Holden launched the LUV in Australia with the 1.6-liter inline-four gasoline engine delivering approximately 50 kW (67 hp) of power and 110 N⋅m (81 lb⋅ft) of torque. Gaining an early reputation for reliability and durability, these original rear-wheel drive models featured a four-speed manual transmission, short-wheelbase construction, and circa 1,000 kg (2,200 lb) payload capacity.

An update in 1978 expanded the LUV range—now comprising the short-wheelbase KB20 model, the new long-wheelbase KB25 and the four-wheel drive KB40 short-wheelbase. These KB25 and KB40 variants were offered in both cab chassis and utility (pickup) body styles and could be specified with the 1.6-liter gasoline engine or the newly available 1.95-liter inline-four diesel. The diesel produced 45 kW (60 hp) and 113 N⋅m (83 lb⋅ft).

North America

Responsibility of sales in North America was delegated to General Motors. Thus, the Isuzu was retailed via Chevrolet dealerships as the "Chevrolet LUV". The only engine was a 1.8-liter (1,817 cc) SOHC inline-four which produced 75 hp (56 kW).

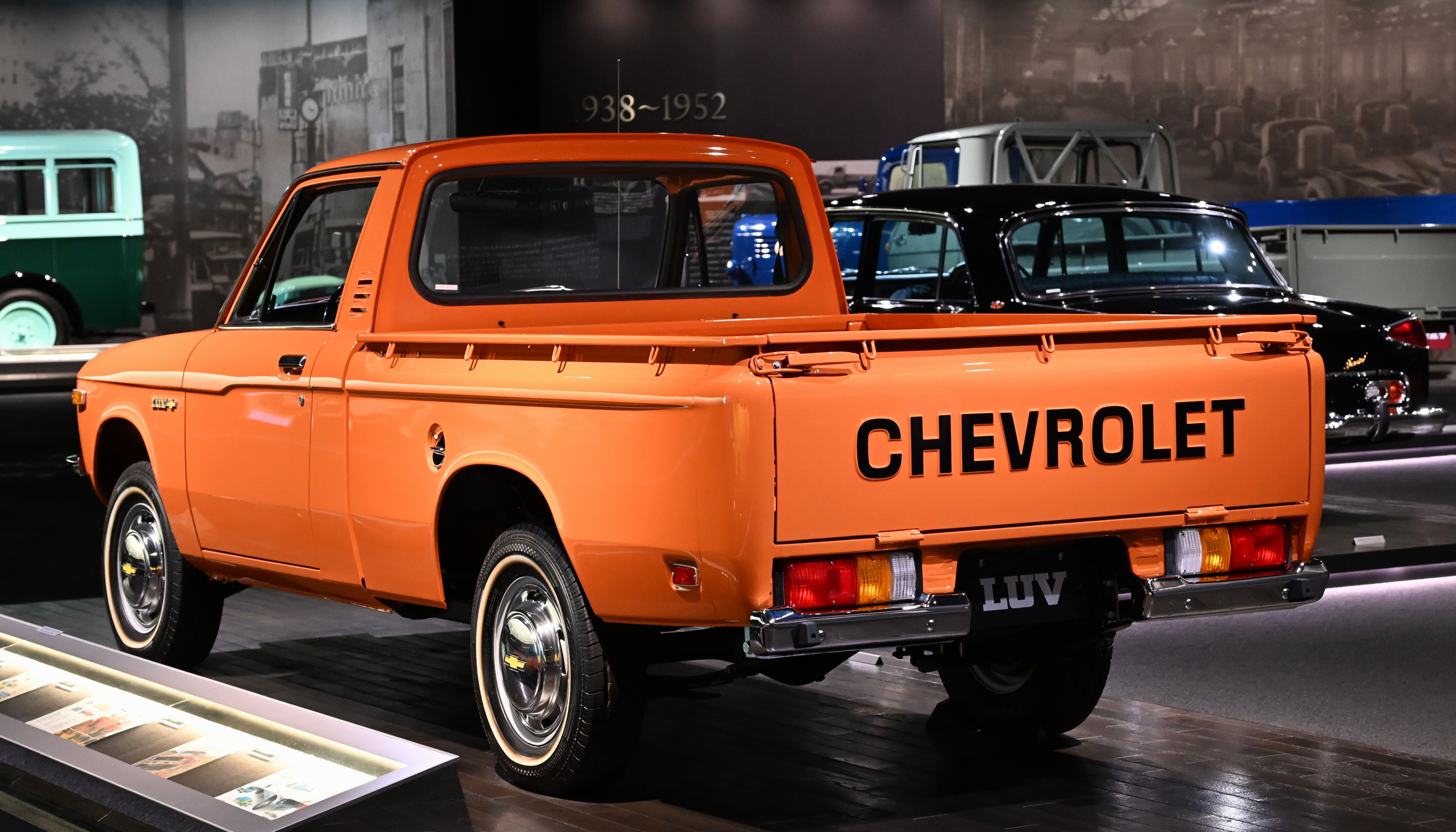
1972 Chevrolet LUV rear 3/4 view

Sales in the United States began in March 1972 as a response to the Datsun and Toyota pickup trucks, as well as Ford's Mazda-built Courier. To circumvent the 25 percent tariff on light trucks (known as the chicken tax), LUVs were imported in cab chassis configuration, which included the entire light truck, less the cargo box or truck bed and were only subject to a 4 percent tariff. Subsequently, a truck bed would be attached to the chassis and the vehicle could be sold as a light truck.

The LUV's exterior was updated slightly for the 1974 model year, but the first major update came in the 1976 model year, when a three-speed automatic transmission option and front disc brakes were added. Power was up to 80 hp (60 kW) for 1977, and sales continued to rise. An exterior refresh and the addition of a 2,285 mm (90 in) cargo bay option, with longer 2,995 mm (118 in) wheelbase, brought sales up to 71,145 in 1978. The addition of four-wheel drive for 1979 brought the LUV to the attention of Motor Trend magazine, and earned it their second "Truck of the Year" award. The LUV was the first four-wheel-drive minitruck available and set a new trend. Sales peaked at 100,192.

== Second generation (1980) ==
Second generation
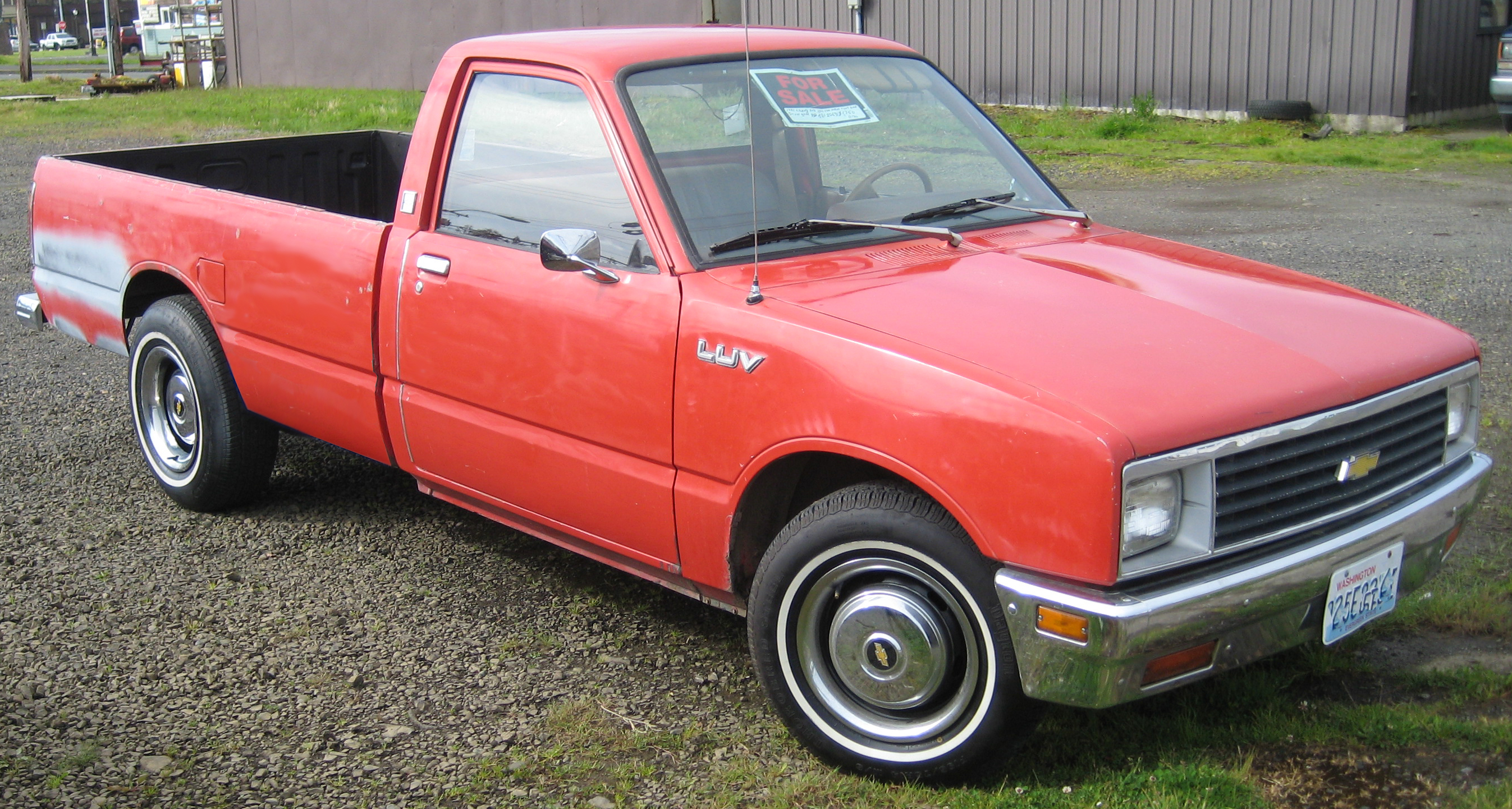
- 1981–1982 Chevrolet LUV 2-door pickup (US)

Overview
- Also called: Isuzu KB; Isuzu Faster-Z (Thailand); Isuzu P'up; Bedford KB; Chevrolet LUV; Chevrolet Stallion (Indonesia); Holden Rodeo; Holden Lincah/Raider (Indonesia)
- Production: 1980–1988; 1980–1994 (Indonesia and Latin America)
- Assembly: Japan: Fujisawa, Kanagawa (Fujisawa Plant); Colombia: Bogotá; Chile: Arica; New Zealand: Trentham; Thailand: Samrong, Samut Prakan; Philippines: Dasmariñas (Pilipinas GM); Indonesia: Bekasi, West Java (until 1994); Surabaya, East Java (Holden Lincah/Raider)

Body and chassis
- Body style: 2-door cab chassis 2-door pickup truck 2-door pickup truck (Space Cab); 3/5-door SUV; 4-door pickup truck (Crew Cab)

Powertrain
- Engine: Gasoline: 1.6 L G161Z I4; 1.6 L 4ZA1 I4; 1.8 L G180Z I4; 1.8 L 4ZB1 I4; 2.0 L G200Z I4; 2.3 L 4ZD1 I4; Diesel: 2.0 L C190 I4; 2.2 L C223 I4; 2.5 L 4JA1 I4

Dimensions
- Wheelbase: 2,650 mm (104.3 in) (SWB); 2,995 mm (117.9 in) (LWB)
- Length: 4,425 mm (174.2 in) (SWB); 4,860 mm (191.3 in) (LWB)
- Width: 1,600 mm (63.0 in)
- Curb weight: 1,099–1,450 kg (2,423–3,197 lb)

Chronology
- Predecessor: Holden WB (Australia, since 1984)

The second generation was more commonly marketed worldwide under the Isuzu label (either as the "Isuzu KB" or just plain "Pick Up"). It continued to use the "Rodeo" suffix for the four-wheel drives. The second generation model was the first Isuzu pickup offered in three cab styles: single cab, double cab and "Space Cab" ("Sports Cab" in some markets). Although it had received a completely new body, its chassis remained the same as its predecessor. Sales in the UK continued as the Bedford KB.

This generation was not shared with the GM North American GMT325 platform, which replaced the North American Chevrolet LUV in 1982.

=== Australia ===
Holden in Australia distributed the second generation Isuzu Faster between January 1981 and August 1988 as the first generation or KB series "Holden Rodeo", for which production started in December 1980. Early KBs were fitted with circular headlamps and a horizontal four-bar grille, but a 1983 model year facelift in December 1982 brought rectangular lamps with a 12-port grille insert as well as restyled side mirrors.

At launch, Holden made the Rodeo available in utility (pickup) and cab chassis body variants in both rear- (LWB) and four-wheel drive (SWB) layouts. All models featured a floor- or column-mounted four-speed synchromesh manual transmission coupled with the 1.6-liter gasoline or 2.0-liter diesel engines. The 1983 model year update increased these displacements to 1.8- and 2.2-liters, respectively. At the same time a new upmarket "LS" model was issued (coded KB28), fitted with a 2.0-liter gasoline engine and five-speed manual. For the 1984 year model, beginning in February 1984, the 2.0-liter became the base gasoline engine.

With the demise of the Holden WB in 1984, the Rodeo became the only pickup and chassis cab vehicle available from Holden (until the arrival of the car-based Holden VG Utility in 1990). The 1985 model from July the same year signaled another facelift, the release of the two-door Space Cab body style, the debut of a new 2.3-liter gasoline engine, and the deletion of the four-speed manual and column-shift selector (making the floor-mounted five-speed manual standard). From March 1986 (1986 model year), the 2.3-liter became the standard gasoline engine and in April the subsequent year, the 1987 models obtained a final facelift with an open rectangular grille design and optional power steering.

Versions with unique local specifications were assembled in New Zealand at GM's Trentham assembly plant. These were also badged as Holdens.

=== Europe ===
The second generation KB was introduced in many European markets, not only Britain, as the Bedford KB. In subsequent years continental markets saw a switch to Isuzu badging as General Motors stopped using the Vauxhall and Bedford brands outside of the United Kingdom. It was called by the model code, Specifications and trims varied depending on market needs, but most received the 1.6-liter G161Z petrol engine with a twin carburettor and 80 PS (59 kW), or the 2-liter C190 diesel inline-four with 54.5 PS (40 kW). Two-wheel-drives were also available on a long wheelbase not offered in combination with four-wheel-drive.

=== North America ===
The United States continued to receive the Faster under the "Chevrolet LUV" name for the second generation, introduced in 1980 for the 1981 model year. The gasoline engine remained the same, but the LUV was now available with an Isuzu C223 diesel engine making 58 hp (43 kW) at 4300 rpm and 93 lb⋅ft (126 N⋅m) at 2200 rpm. This new engine gave the rear-wheel drive diesel LUV a fuel economy rating of 33 mpg_{‑US} (7.1 L/100 km) city / 44 mpg_{‑US} (5.3 L/100 km) highway.

After the 1982 model year, General Motors stopped selling the Chevrolet LUV (although many '82s lingered on dealer lots into the next year) in the United States in favor of their own S-10 compact pickup. Meanwhile, Isuzu had sold their version in parallel with the LUV since their 1981 entry to the US market, under the name "Isuzu P'up" (short for "pickup"). Isuzu's version received another grille and other differences to set it apart from the LUV, not the least of which is the giant "ISUZU" block letters on the tailgate. The P'up received the same engines as the LUV; either an 80 hp (60 kW) 1.8-liter gasoline inline-four (G180Z) or a 2.2-liter diesel version with 58 hp (43 kW) (C223). Four-wheel drive was available with either engine but only in short-wheelbase form, though some 4WD long-wheelbase diesel are known to exist, possibly dealer-installed or aftermarket conversions. Because of technology-sharing agreement between GM and Isuzu, the diesel was also offered with the LUV's replacement until 1985. Later, the gasoline engine was upgraded to Isuzu's 1.95-liter four and a turbodiesel version was added, with the turbo standard on diesel-engined 4WD models.

For 1987, the P'up gained a "Spacecab" extended cab model. This was only available in LS or Deluxe trim. Also new was the option of a 2.3-liter gasoline four (standard on 4WDs). Production for the Mexican and Latin American markets did not end until 1994.

=== South America ===
As with North America, the Isuzu KB was generally issued under the name "Chevrolet LUV" in South America. Manufactured in Colombia from Japanese complete knock down (CKD) sets, these models entered production in 1980 to be exported to other South American countries, continuing on until the release of the TF series in 1988. At the start, the versions assembled were the K-26 and K-28. It was offered with a 1584 cc (G161Z) engine. It was also offered a (C190) diesel version of 1951 cc and 62 PS (46 kW). This model of the Isuzu KB only was assembled in Chile via CKD kits from Japanese origin.

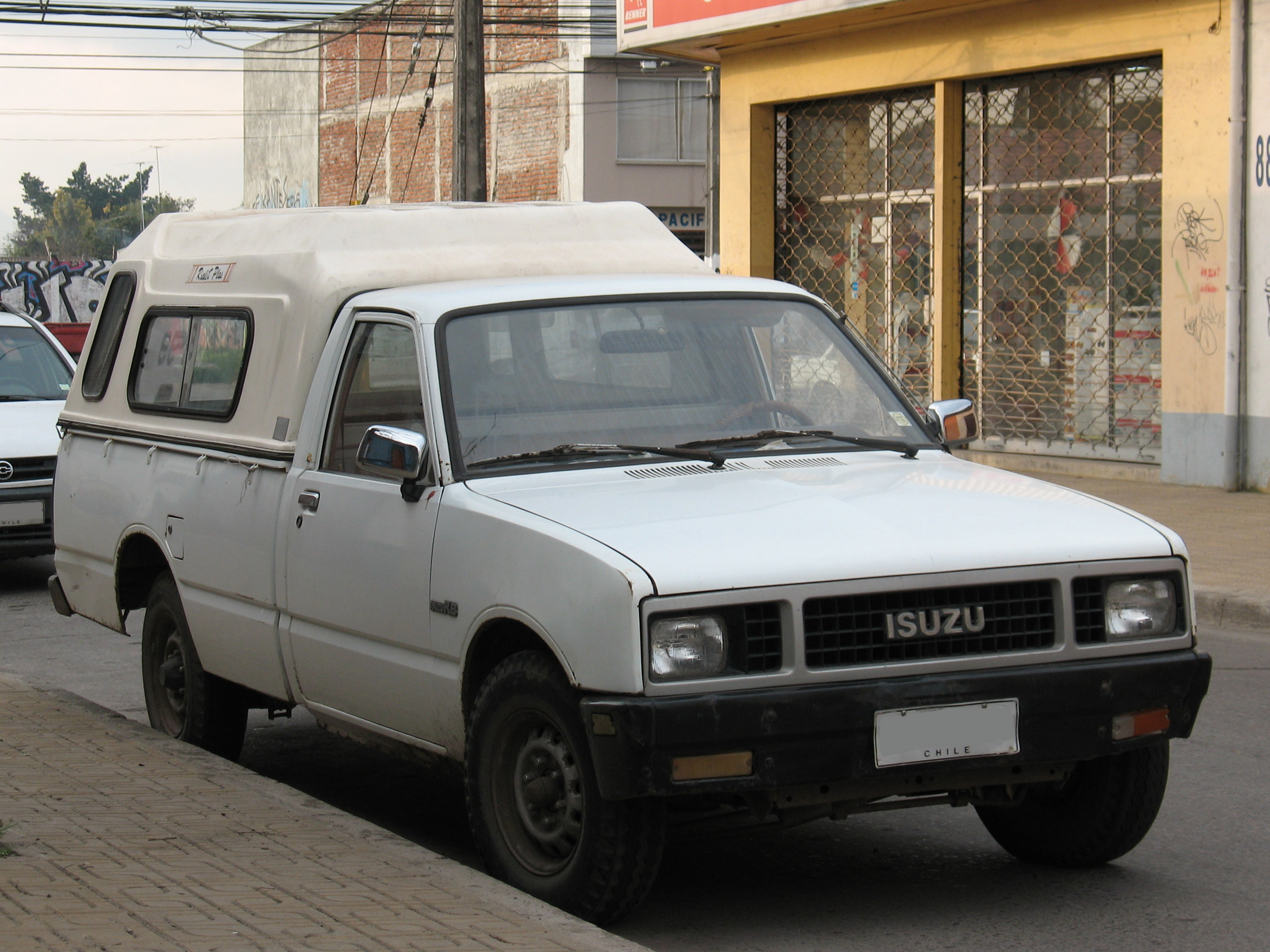
Isuzu KB 2-door pickup (Chile)

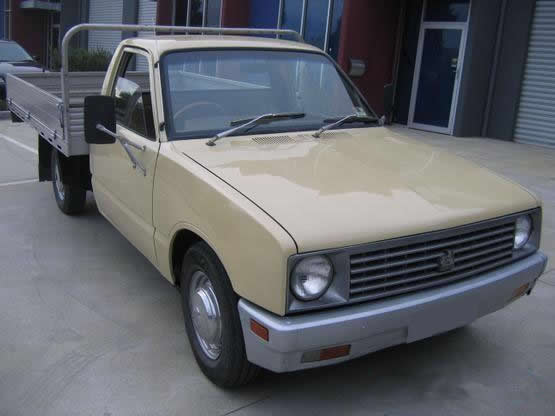
1981 Holden Rodeo (KBD26) 2-door cab chassis

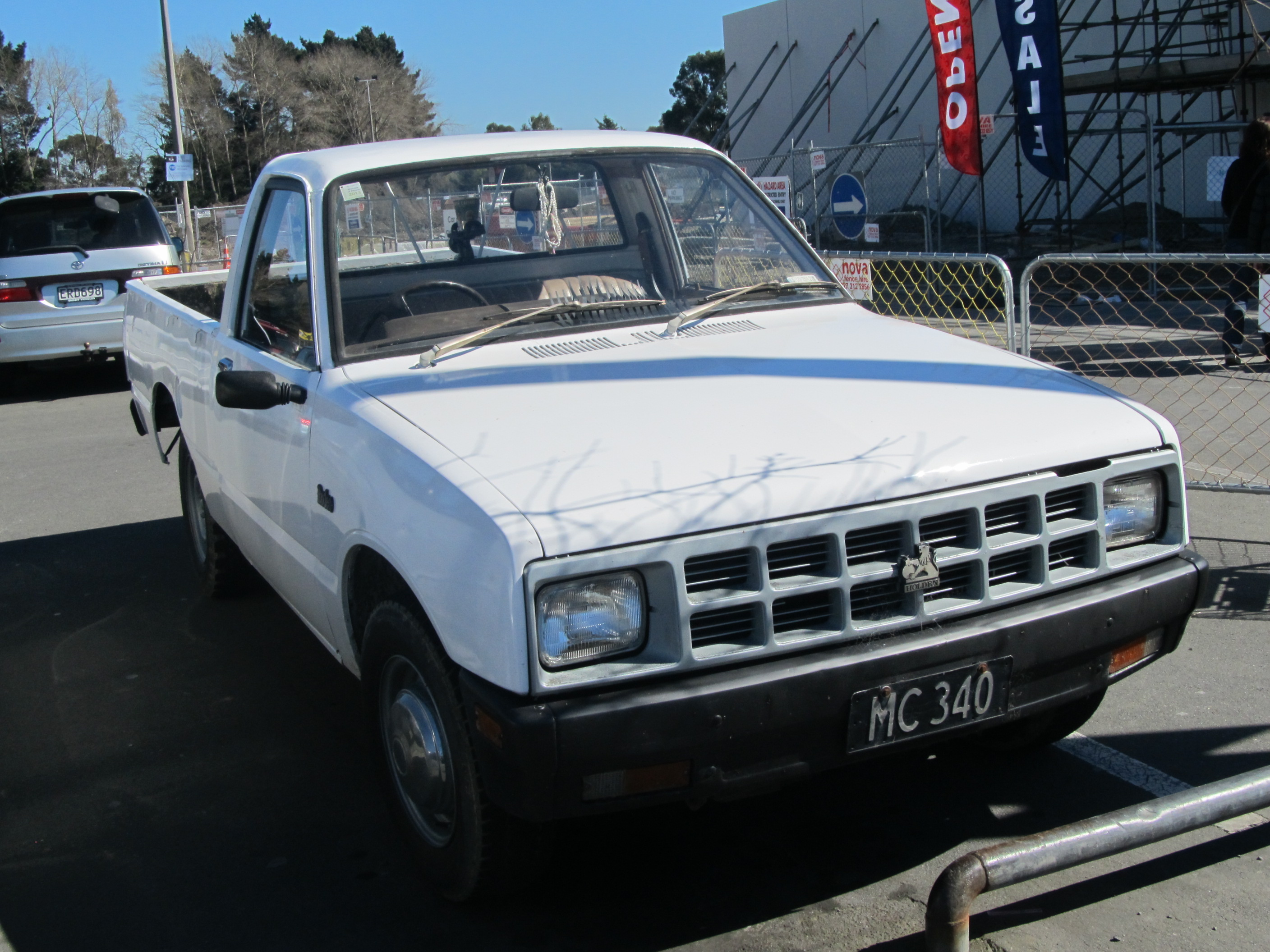
1985 Holden Rodeo (KB) 2-door pickup (New Zealand)

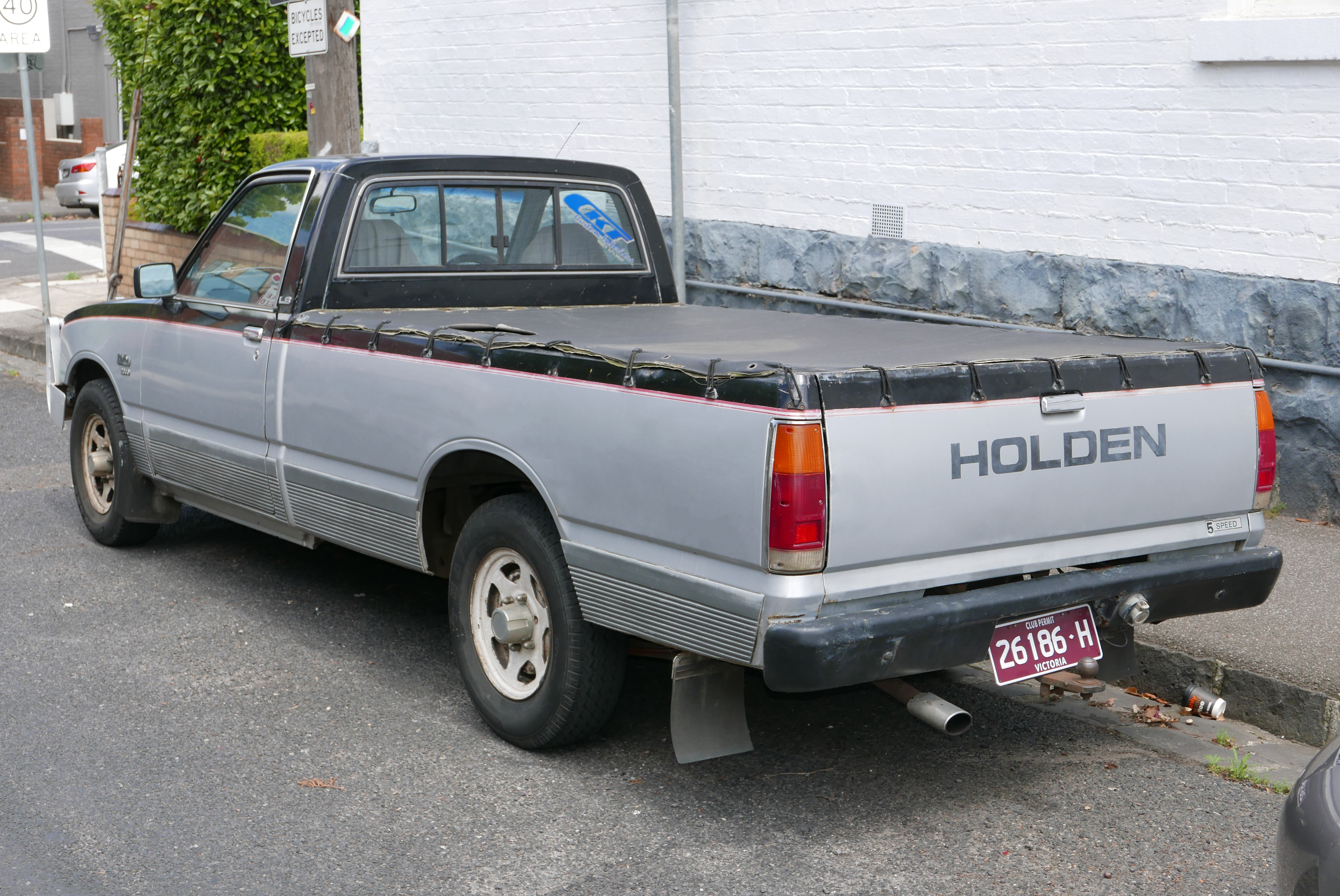
1982–1985 Holden Rodeo (KB28) LS 2-door pickup

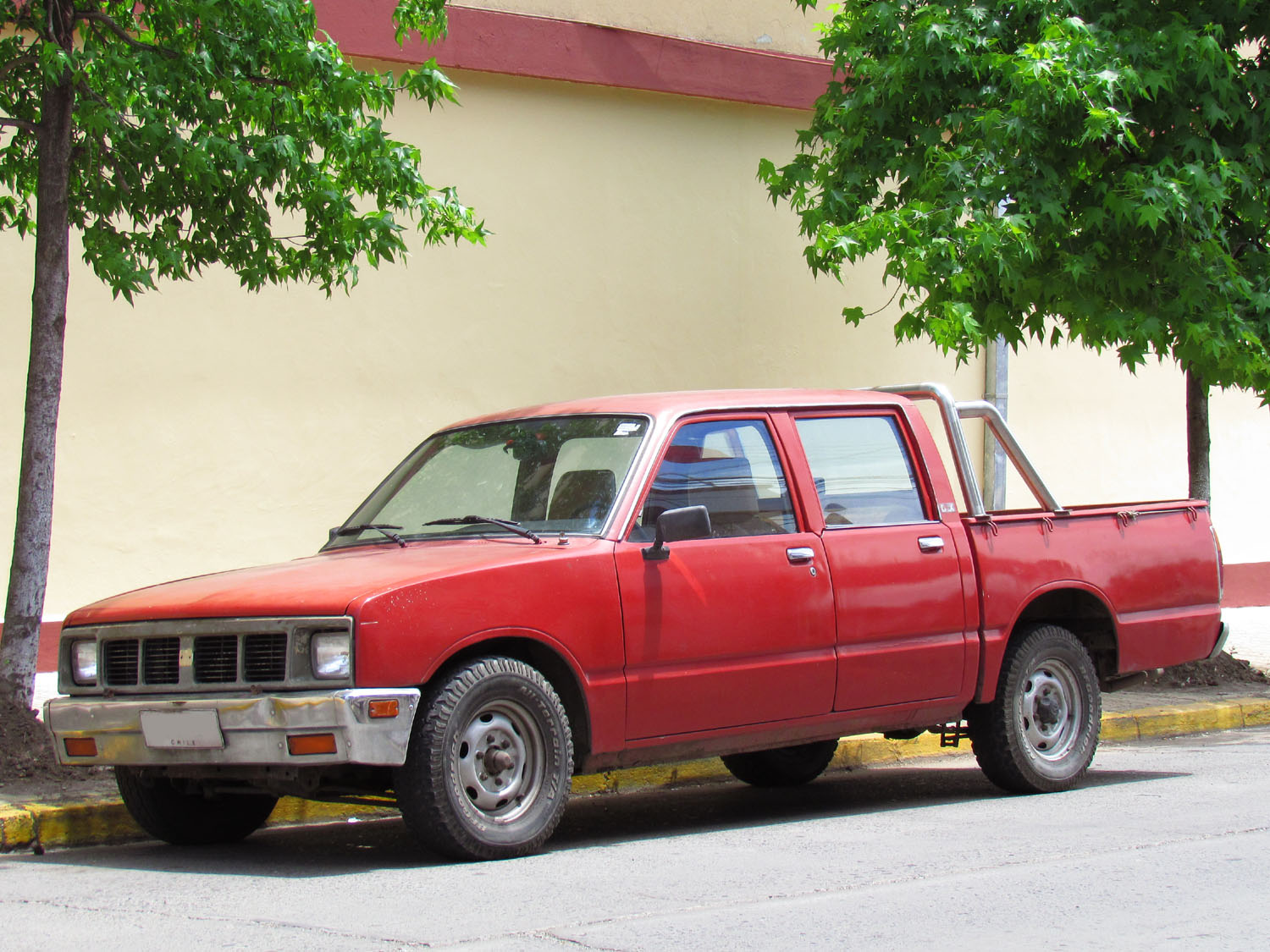
1988 Chevrolet LUV DLX Crew Cab

== Third generation (TF; 1988) ==
Third generation
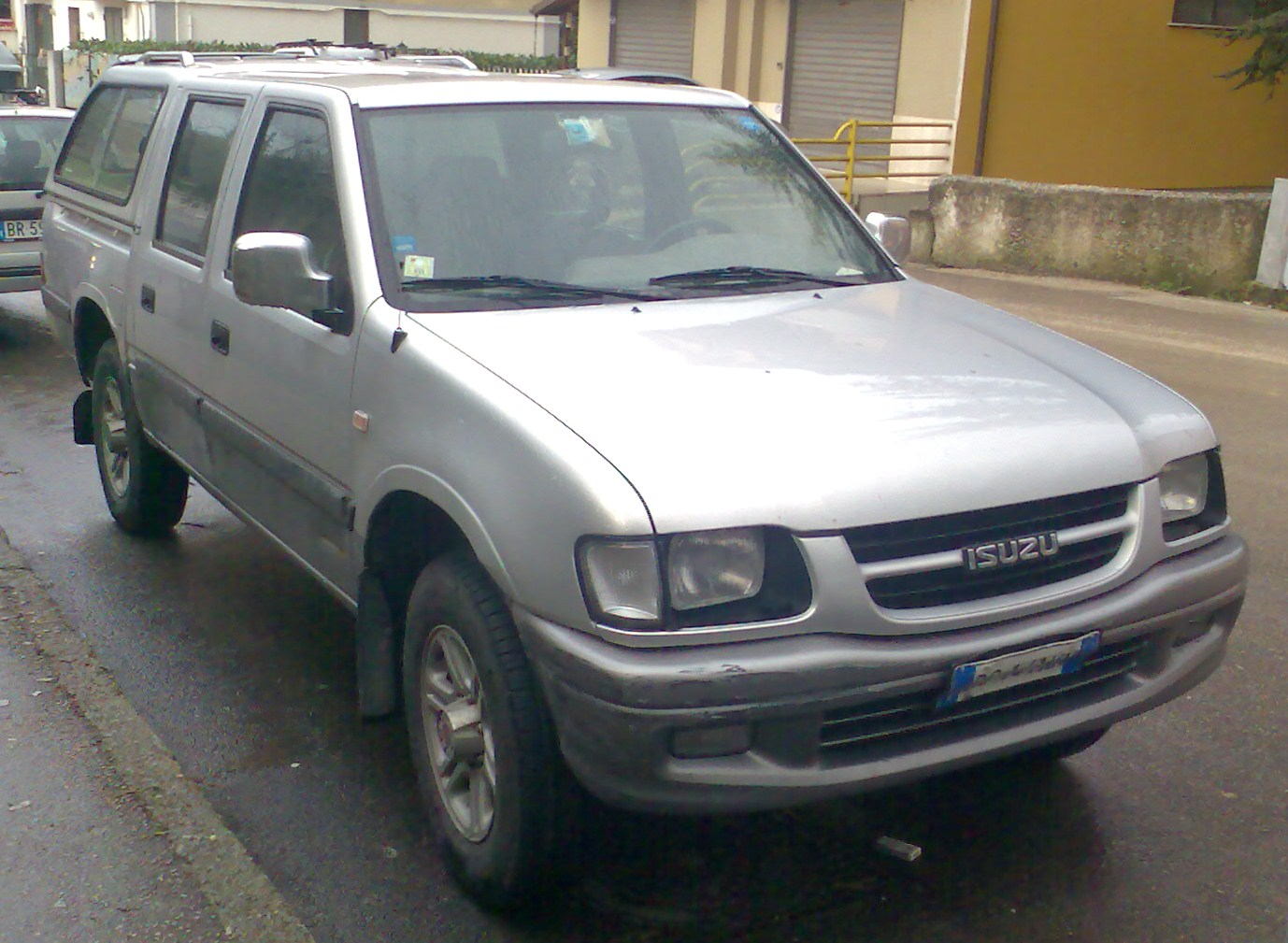
- Isuzu TF 4-door pickup (Italy)

Overview
- Also called: Isuzu Rodeo (Japan and Thailand; 4WD only); Isuzu Dragon Eyes (Thailand; 1998–2000); Isuzu Super Dragon Eyes (Thailand; 1999–2000); Isuzu Dragon Power (Thailand; 2000–2002); Isuzu Fuego (Philippines); Isuzu Invader (Malaysia); Isuzu Ippon (Israel); Isuzu KB (South Africa); Isuzu Pickup (North America); Isuzu TF; Isuzu TFR (Thailand); Isuzu TT Fortigo; Chevrolet LUV; Chevrolet T-Series (Egypt); Holden Rodeo; Honda Tourmaster (Thailand); Opel Campo; Vauxhall Brava (United Kingdom); Bedford Brava (United Kingdom); Foton SUP (China); Jinbei Jindian SY10 (China); JiangLing Baodian (China); JiangLing Hunter (Philippines); Winnerway ZH6500/ZH1021LU2 (China); Xinkai Century (China); Autorrad Century (China); GMC Dragon (Mexico; 1996–2001); GMC Invader (Mexico; 1998–2002); GMC LUV (Middle East)
- Production: 1988–2002; 1992–2017 (China)
- Assembly: Japan: Fujisawa, Kanagawa (Fujisawa Plant); Chile: GM Chile Arica Plant; China: Beijing (Foton), Shenyang (Jinbei), Chongqing (Qingling), Nanchang (Jiangling); Colombia: GM Colmotores Bogotá Plant; Philippines: Dasmariñas (1989–1992), Biñan (1992–2005) (IPC); Portugal: Vendas Novas (ITUK); Thailand: Samrong, Samut Prakan; Tunisia: Kairouan (IMM); United States: Lafayette, Indiana

Body and chassis
- Body style: 2-door pickup truck 2-door pickup truck (Space Cab); 4-door pickup truck (Crew Cab)
- Related: Isuzu Wizard (first generation); Isuzu Panther

Powertrain
- Engine: gasoline: 2.2 L C22NE/22LE I4; 2.3 L 4ZD1 I4; 2.6 L 4ZE1 I4; 3.1 L LG6 V6; 3.2 L 6VD1 V6; diesel: 2.5 L 4JA1-T turbo I4; 2.8 L 4JB1-T turbo I4; 3.0 L 4JH1-T turbo I4; 3.1 L 4JG2-T turbo I4; gasoline (China): 2.0 L 4G63 I4 (Jiangling); 2.2 L I4 (Jinbei); 2.4 L I4 (Jiangling); 2.5 L 4ZE3 I4 (Qingling Isuzu); diesel (China): 2.1 L turbo I4 (Jinbei); 2.2 L turbo I4 (Jinbei); 2.4 L C240 I4; 2.4 L turbo I4 (Jinbei); 3.0 L 4HK1-TC1 turbo I4 (Qingling Isuzu)
- Transmission: 5-speed manual 4-speed automatic

Dimensions
- Wheelbase: 2,680 mm (105.5 in) (SWB); 3,025 mm (119.1 in) (LWB)
- Length: 4,425 mm (174.2 in) (SWB); 4,940 mm (194.5 in) (LWB); 6,150 mm (242.1 in) (Rodeo Camper)
- Width: 1,690 mm (66.5 in)
- Curb weight: 1,295–1,698 kg (2,855–3,743 lb)

For the third generation (TF), introduced in 1988, the domestic Japanese lineup was divided into two, with the "Faster" label used on rear-wheel drive versions with four-wheel drives now sold as the Isuzu Rodeo. Rodeo became the name used in most markets for this car, but the profusion of labels for different markets continued. Versions sold in the Americas were called Isuzu Pickup and Chevrolet LUV. In the United Kingdom, the pickup was called Isuzu TF and also Bedford Brava from 1988 until 1991 when the Bedford brand was dropped and it became the Vauxhall Brava. The Isuzu was also sold in mainland Europe along with the Opel Campo. This Opel branding was also utilized in the Middle East, parts of North Africa and some Asian countries.

Holden Rodeo was the only name used in Australasia, with the Isuzu KB name used in South Africa and some other markets. The names Isuzu Faster-Z, Isuzu TFR, and Honda Tourmaster were used in Thailand. A Thai-market SUV based on the TF was sold as the Thairung Adventure, produced in semi-knocked-down by Thai Rung Union Car. Names used in other markets include: Chevrolet T-Series (Egypt), Isuzu Ippon (Israel), Isuzu Fuego (Philippines), and as the Isuzu Invader in the north-eastern parts of Malaysia (Sabah). License built copies have been sold as the Jinbei SY10 series, Foton Aoling T-Series in China, where the car has served as a basis for innumerable local copies, authorized and unauthorized.

In Japan, two-wheel drive versions were called "Isuzu Faster", with the "Rodeo" name reserved for four-wheel drive units. In 1992, an updated version of the 4JB1 2.8-litre turbodiesel with direct injection was introduced; while the original 2.8 has 100 PS (74 kW), the direct-injected version offered 110 PS (81 kW; 108 hp) at 3,600 rpm and 23.0 kg⋅m (226 N⋅m; 166 lb⋅ft) of torque at 2,300 rpm. Japanese sales ended in 1994 without replacement, although export markets continued to receive the vehicle until replaced by the D-Max from 2002.

From 1990 to 1993, Isuzu Japan had Yokohama Motor Sales manufacture a four-berth camper on the Isuzu Rodeo TFS55H chassis platform. This was the 4WD version which gave offroad accessibility and comfort. This model only came with the 2.8 litre 4JB1T turbo-diesel engine and 5-speed manual transmission with low/high transferbox. There was no automatic option on offer.

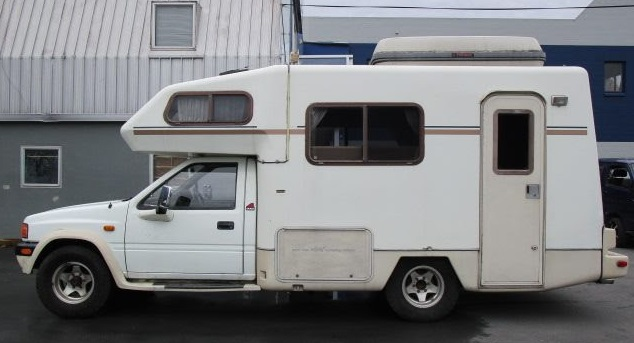
1998 Isuzu Rodeo LWB Camper TFS55H

The TF series received a facelift in 1997. Styling was changed, with a more rounded look at the front, and a new-look dash similar to that used in the 1995 to 1997 model Isuzu Wizard. In China, where the TF is still built by Isuzu's local joint venture partner Qingling Motors, it received a second facelift at the beginning of 2015. In China, this vehicle is sometimes marketed as the "Isuzu Pika", a sinicization of "pickup".

=== Australia ===
Holden introduced the TF series into Australia in 1988, branded as the Holden Rodeo, following on from the name of the previous Isuzu based light truck sold by the brand in Australia. The Holden Rodeo was initially available with a 2.6-liter 88 kW (118 hp) inline-four. A 2.8-liter 74 kW (99 hp) turbodiesel was introduced soon after. Body styles offered were a two-door single cab, a two-door SpaceCab, with space for two small jump-seats (rarely if ever fitted in Australia) behind the front passengers, and a four-door Crewcab, with space for the driver and four passengers. Several trim levels were available, which included DX (base model), LX (mid-range RWD, top of the 4WD range) and LT (top of the range, only available as an RWD petrol Crewcab).

The facelifted 1997 (1998 model year) Holden Rodeo came with a new trim level, LT Sport, available as a four-wheel Crewcab only. Airbags for the driver and front passenger also became an option. By 1998 the 2.6-liter engine was discontinued and a new engine was offered, a 3.2-liter 140 kW (188 hp) V6. This engine was available in both rear- and four-wheel-drive. The rear-wheel-drive version had the same chassis, and thus ride-height as the four-wheel-drive, but without the transfer case and front axle. The 3.2-liter V6 was the most powerful engine in a pickup truck in Australia until it was replaced in 2003 by the new look Rodeo based on the Isuzu D-Max. Accordingly, this engine was the most popular engine in the Rodeo, and the Rodeo sold very well overall, near the sales numbers of the Toyota Hilux, traditionally the best-selling commercial vehicle in Australia.

The Holden Rodeo was updated once again in 2001 for the 2002 model year, with a new diesel engine, a 3.1-liter 96 kW (129 hp) direct injection intercooled turbodiesel. The update was also accompanied by minor styling changes, such as clear indicator lenses, and a different grille.

=== Europe ===
In Europe, the Isuzu was sold as the TF alongside the rebadged "Opel Campo". It was also sold as the "Isuzu Campo." In the United Kingdom "Bedford Brava" badging was used rather than Opel. When the Bedford brand was retired, it was rebadged as a Vauxhall. These received the same updates as did the Isuzu TF in general markets, and a variety of body styles were available, usually coupled with diesel engines.

=== North America ===
In North America, the TF series appeared in 1988 as simply the "Isuzu Pickup". Produced at Lafayette, Indiana, Isuzu continued on with the TF until 1996 when it was finally replaced with the Hombre (a badged-engineered Chevrolet S-10). The only engines available were the 96 hp (72 kW) 2.3-liter 4ZD1, the 120 PS (88 kW; 118 hp) 2.6-liter 4ZE1 and the GM 3.1-liter V-6 (designation LG6) producing 120 hp (89 kW) and 170 lb⋅ft (230 N⋅m) for the 1991–1994 model years. The 2.3-liter version holds the distinction of becoming the last carbureted passenger vehicle sold new in the United States (1994 model year). There was also a heavier, work oriented one-tonne model available. The truck continued to be sold in Mexico, and Latin America until production ended in 2016.

=== South America ===
As with the previous KB series generation, South American markets again received the TF models under the "Chevrolet LUV" name. The Chilean assembling works began in 1982, meanwhile in Colombia commenced in 1989, In the assembling process, the local parts usage percentage was high and important for the LUV manufacturing process. In Chile it has to reach 40% percent domestic parts content, meanwhile in Colombia exceeded 70%.

A successful export program beginning in Chile in 1980s to the Andean Community countries: Bolivia, Ecuador and Venezuela; and in 1993 began the exports from Chilean assembled units (in the SpaceCab model only) to Bolivia, Peru, Argentina, Mexico, Uruguay, Paraguay, Colombia, and Venezuela. In total, more than 220,000 units were produced only in Chile, and more than 300.000 in Colombia. From 1999 and to little success, Thai Rung Union Car supplied the Chevrolet plant in Arica, Chile with the unique body panels from their "Isuzu Grand Adventure" model to make the Chevrolet Grand Adventure and the "Chevrolet Grand LUV". The Grand Adventure was a wagon version of the TF series pickup.

By the late 1980s, supplementary assembly began in Quito, Ecuador by Omnibus BB Transportes (now General Motors Ecuador) with a 1.6-liter inline-four cylinder engine, making 80 PS (59 kW).

In October 2005; was ceased the Isuzu Faster Chilean manufacture. In Colombia, the Isuzu Faster has ceased its production in 2010. The last Faster rolled off the assembly line on May 8, 2010. In both countries, the Isuzu Faster was replaced by the Isuzu D-Max, these firsts units were assembled only in Ecuador and later from vehicles coming from Thailand (2014 onwards).

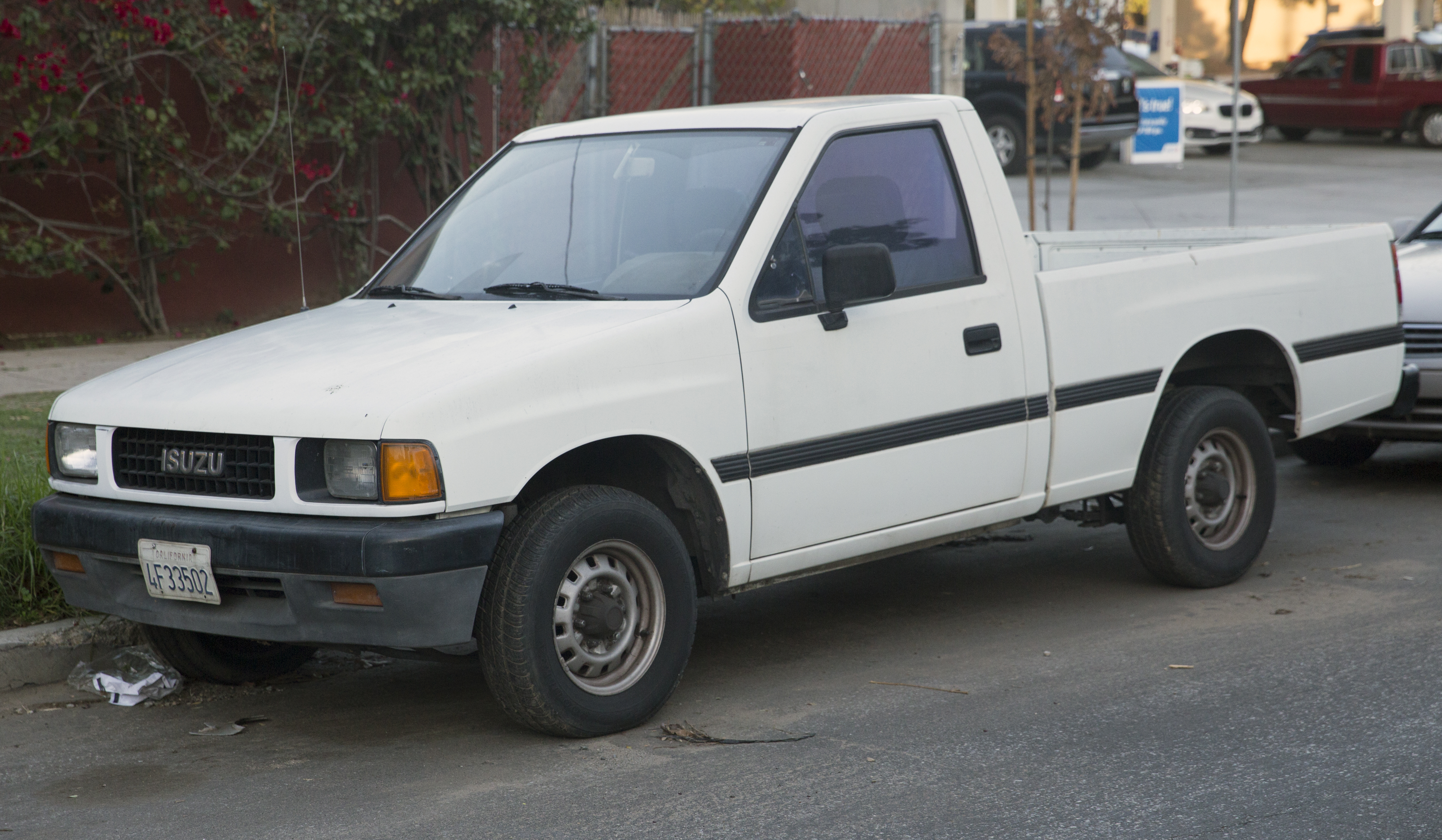
1990 Isuzu Pickup regular cab, United States

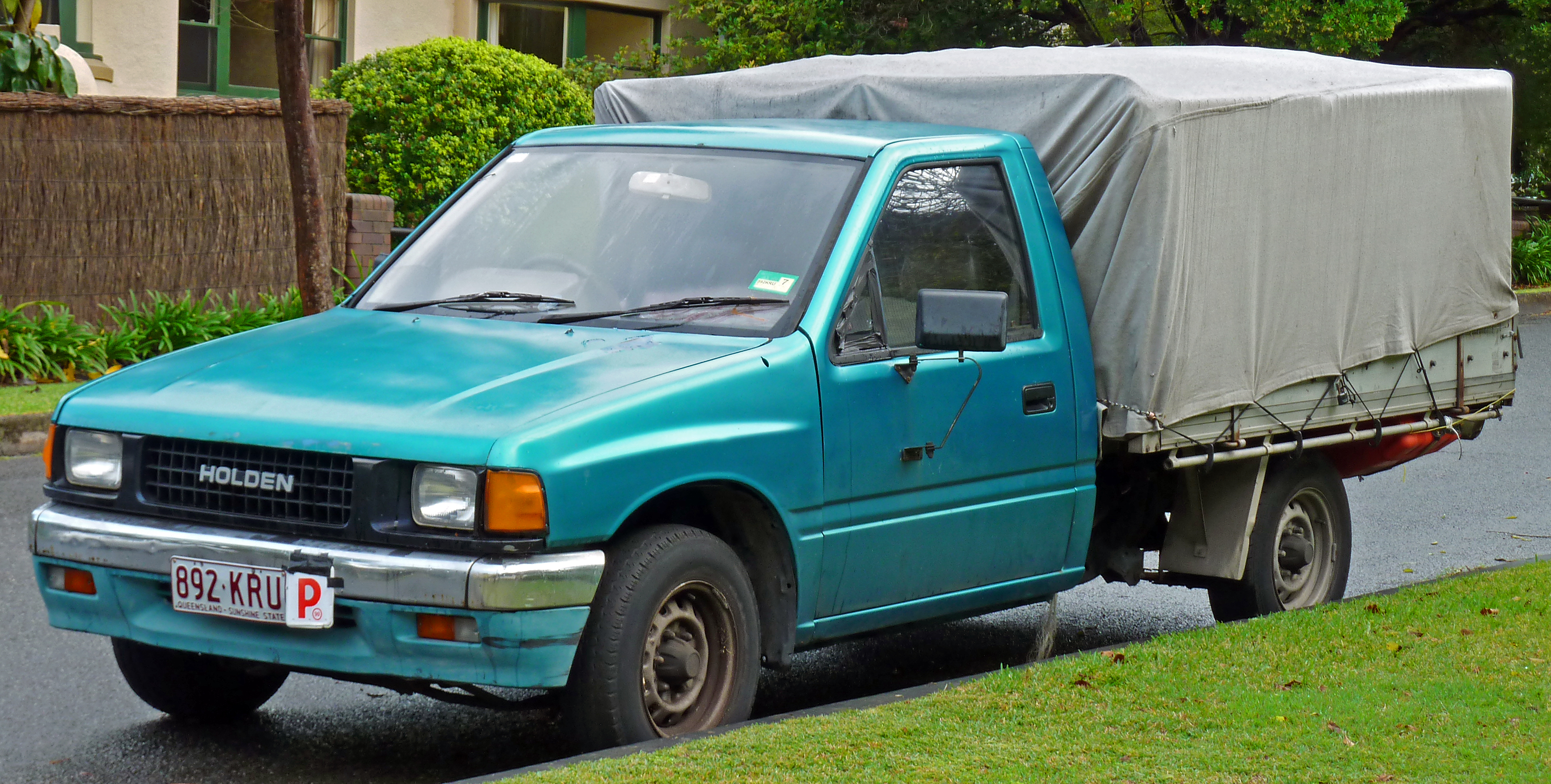
1988–1990 Holden Rodeo 2-door cab chassis

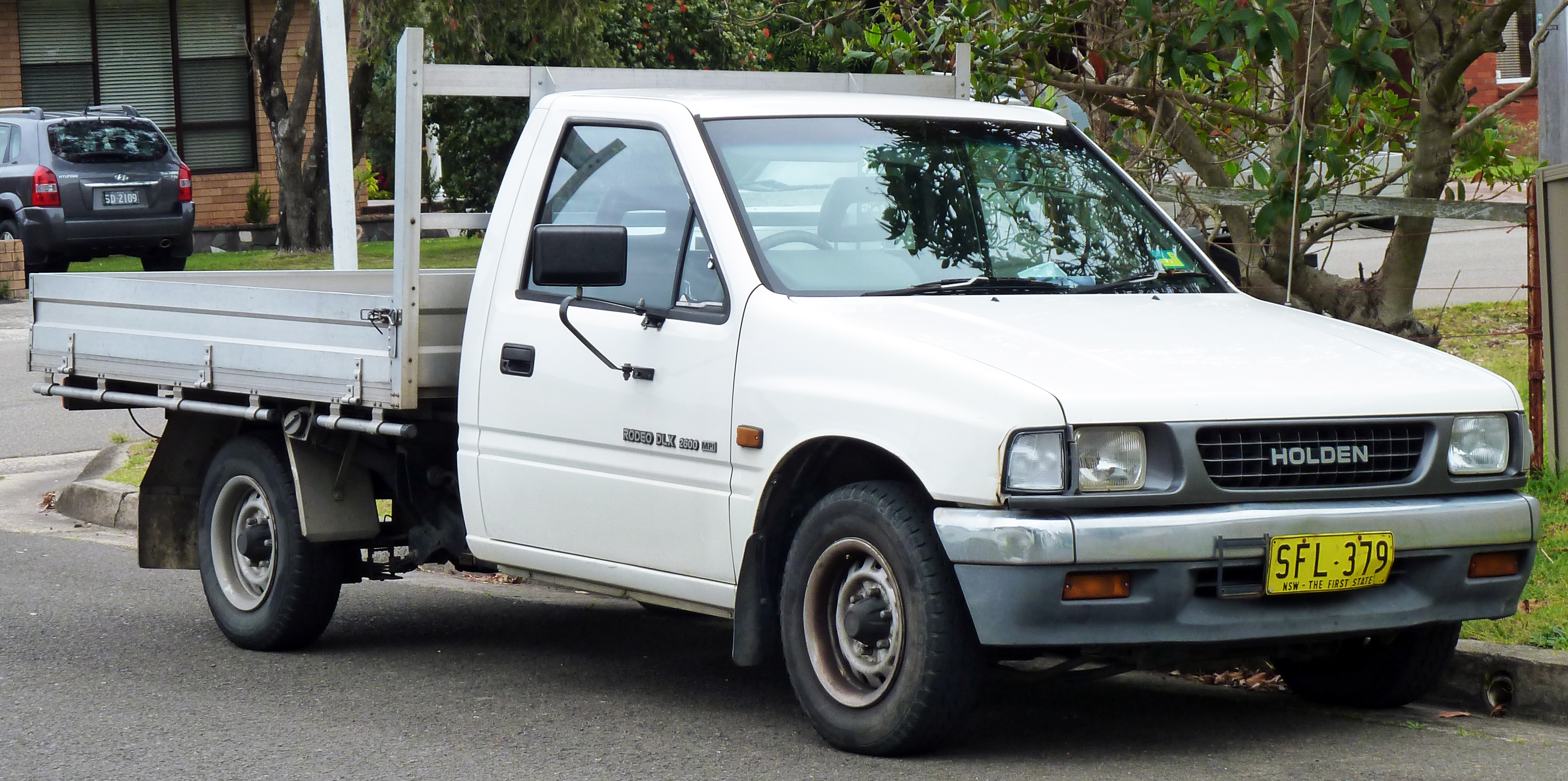
1991–1992 Holden Rodeo DLX 2-door cab chassis

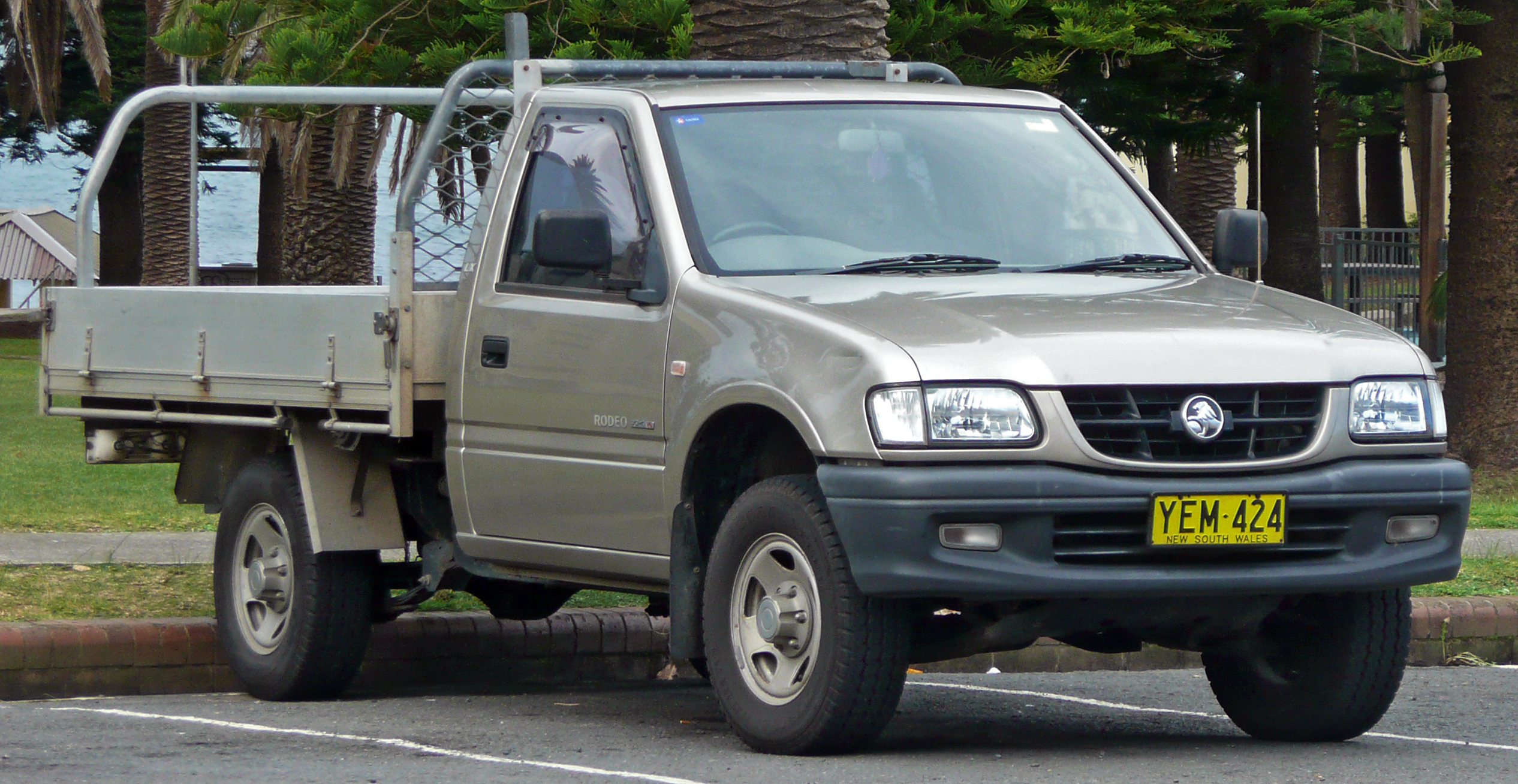
2001–2003 Holden Rodeo LX 2-door cab chassis

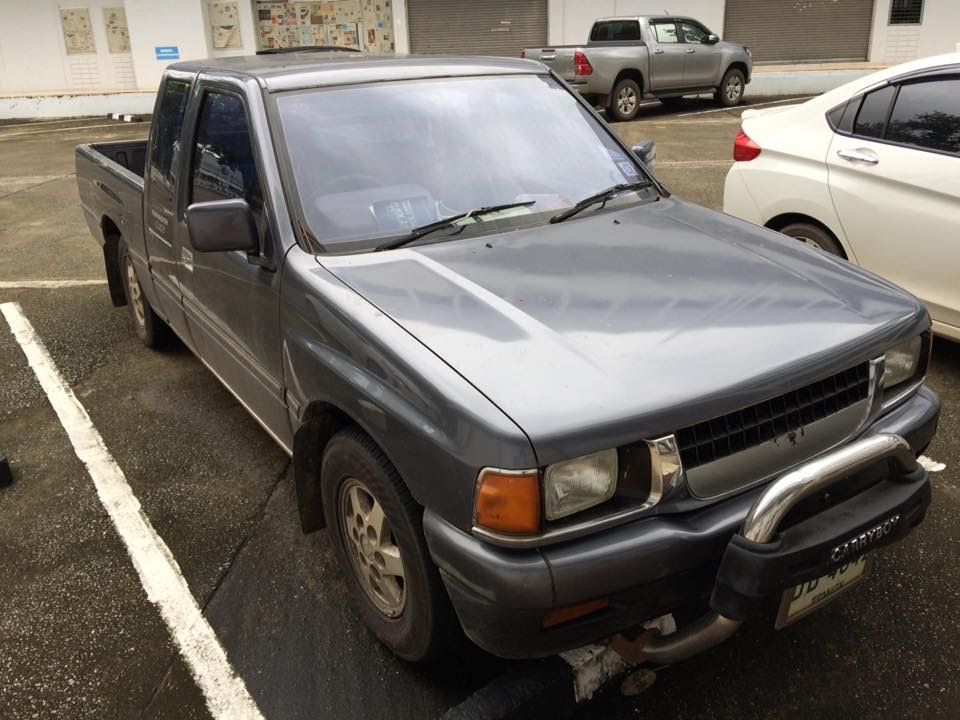
1996 Honda Tourmaster LXS

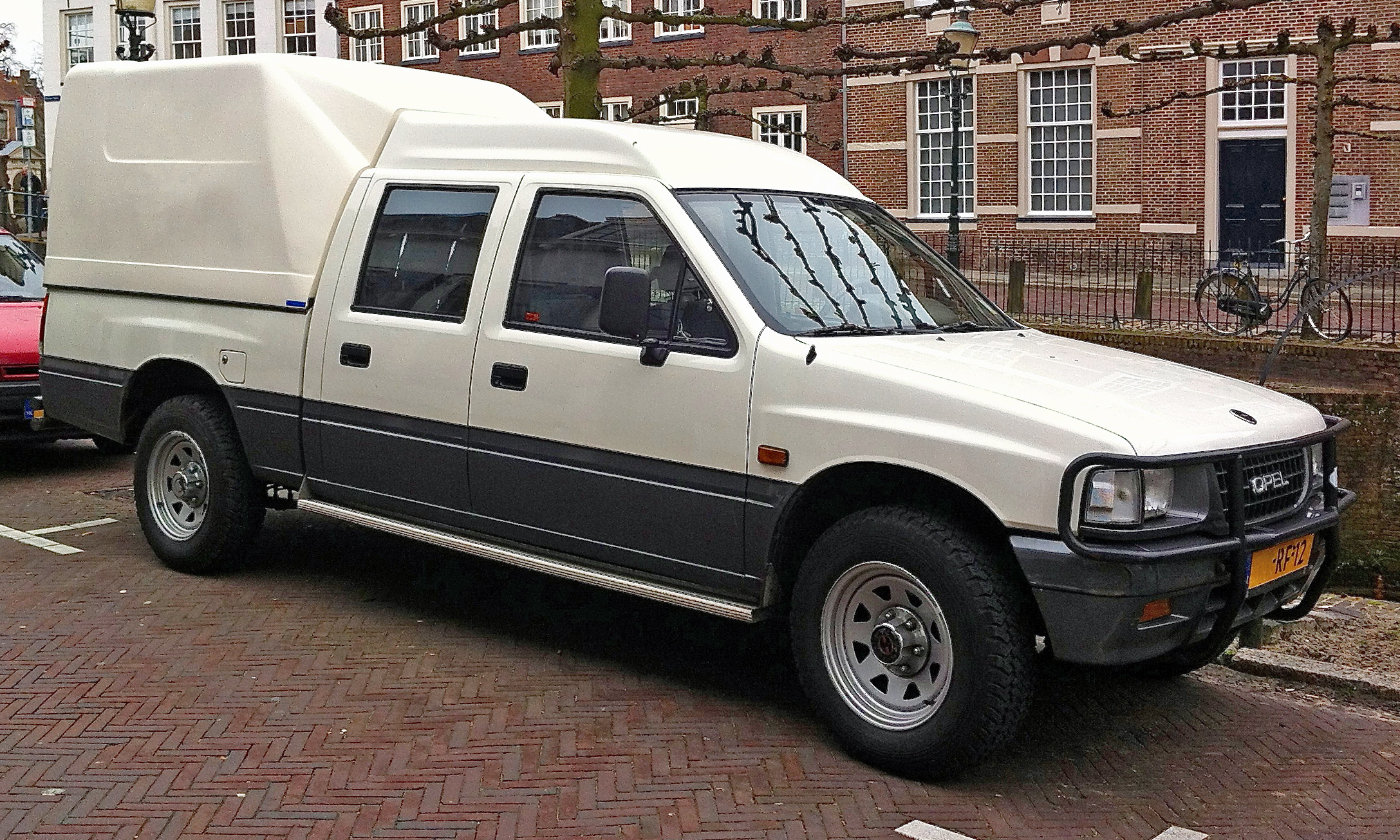
1996 Opel Campo Crew Cab (TFS54)

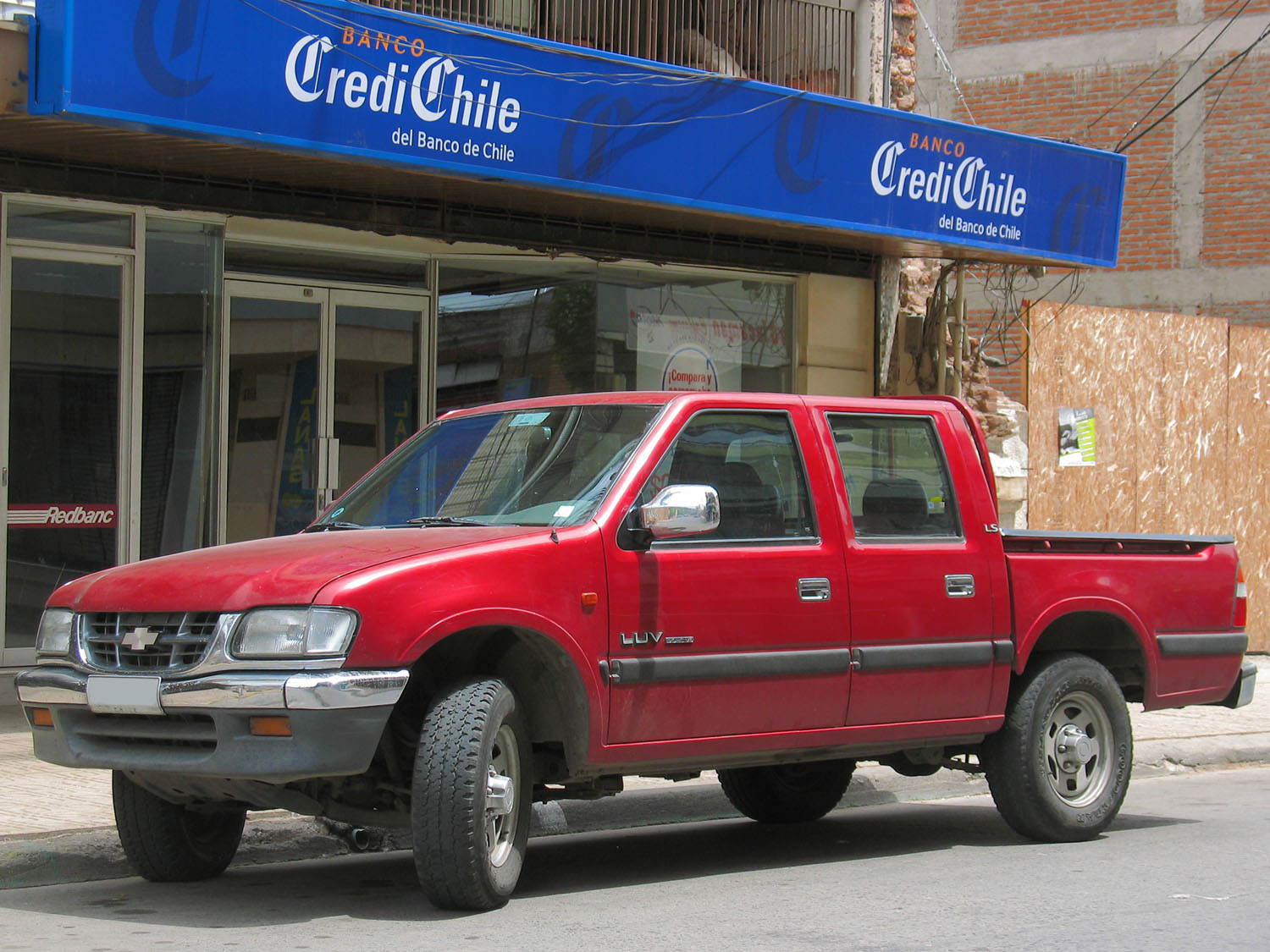
2000 Chevrolet LUV LS

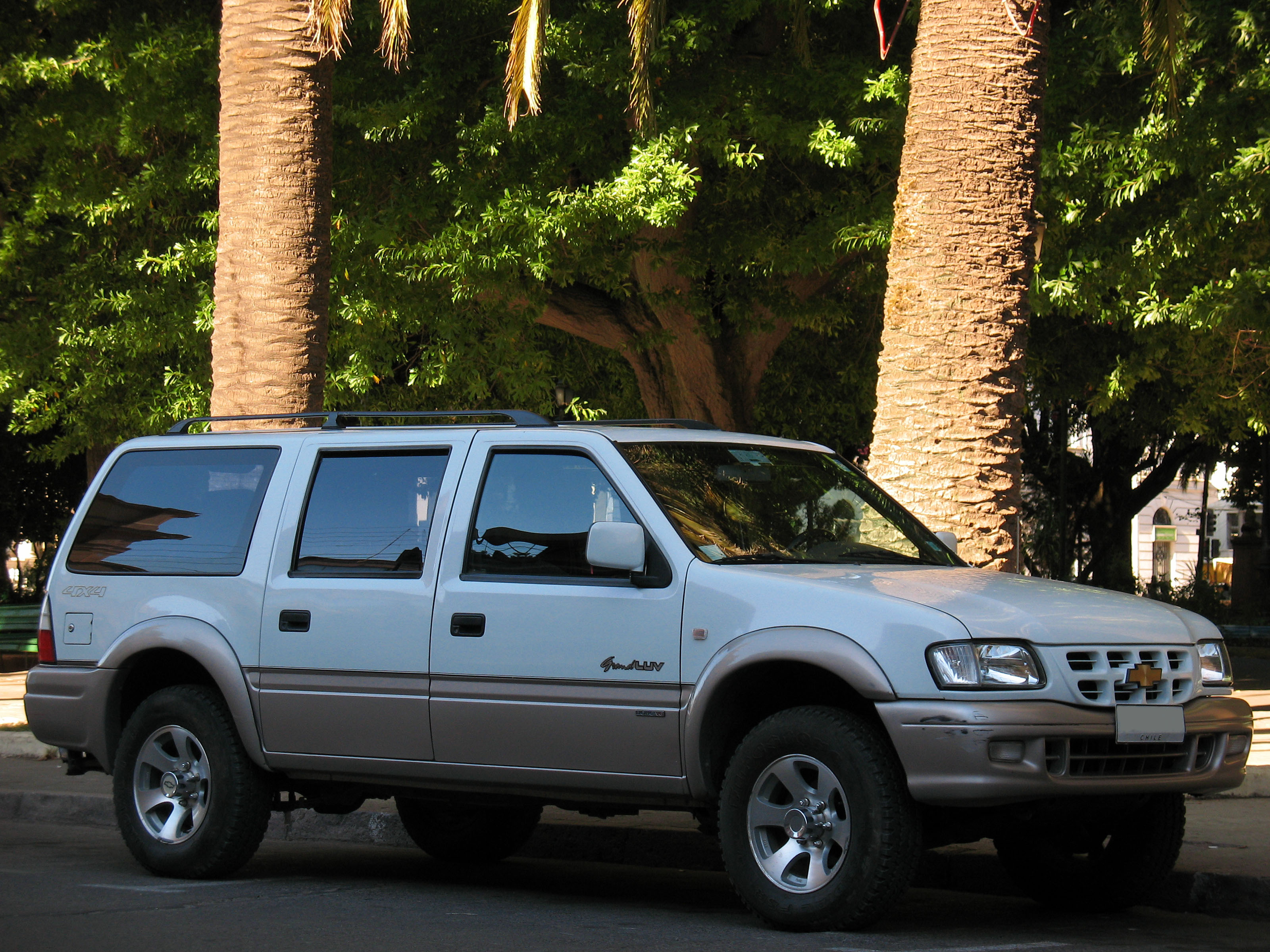
2002 Chevrolet Grand LUV wagon

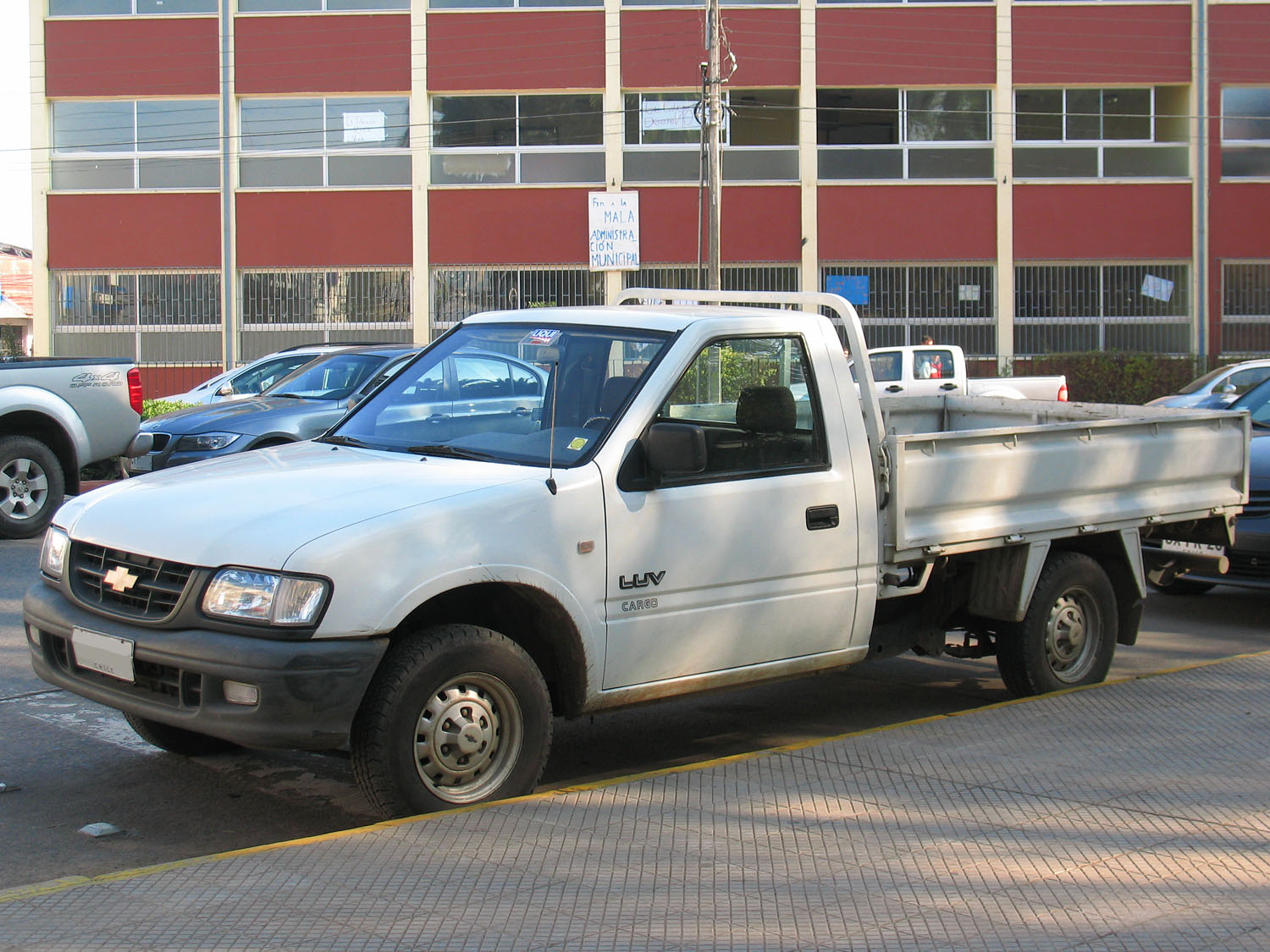
2004 Chevrolet LUV Cargo

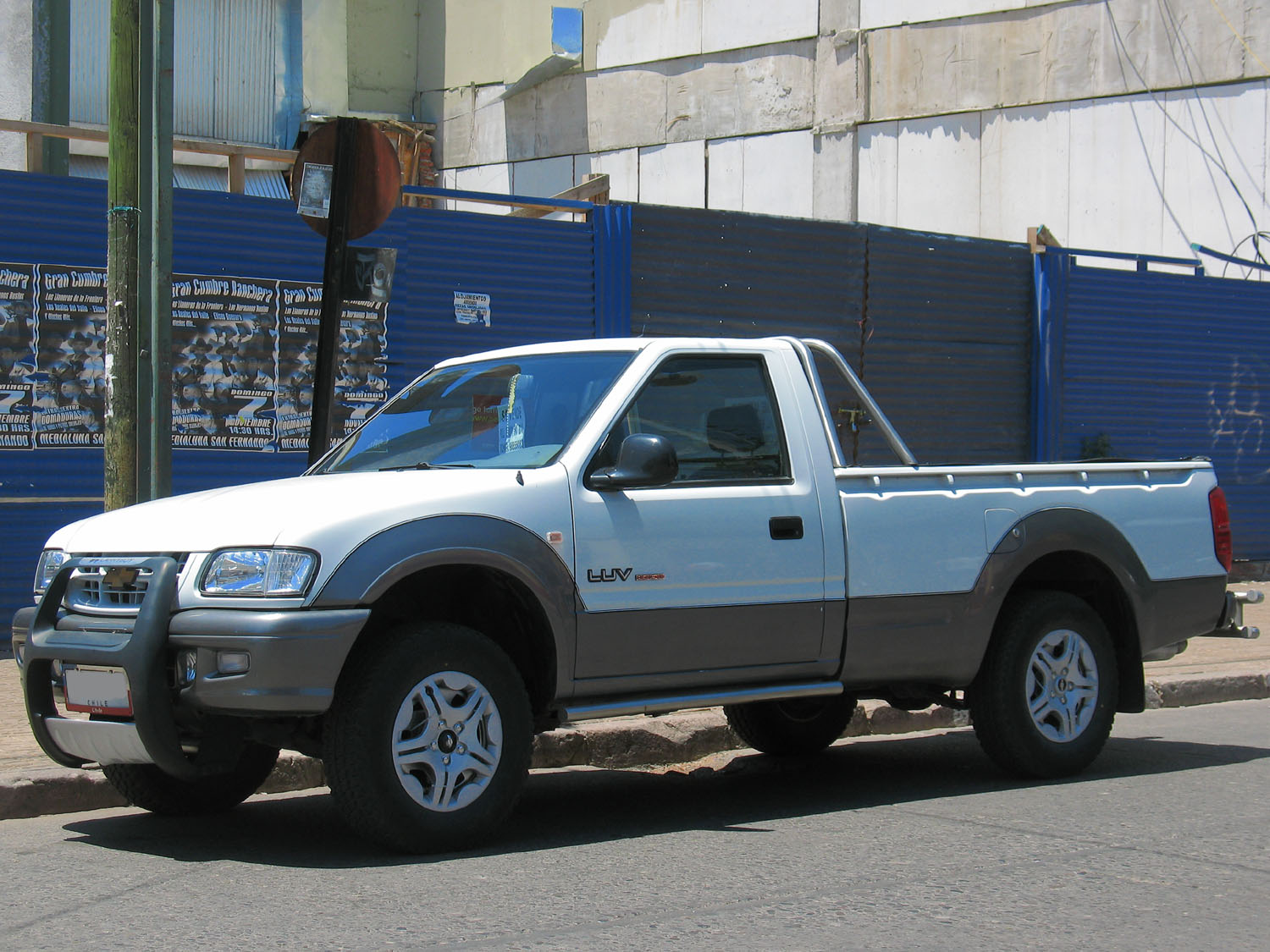
2005 Chevrolet LUV

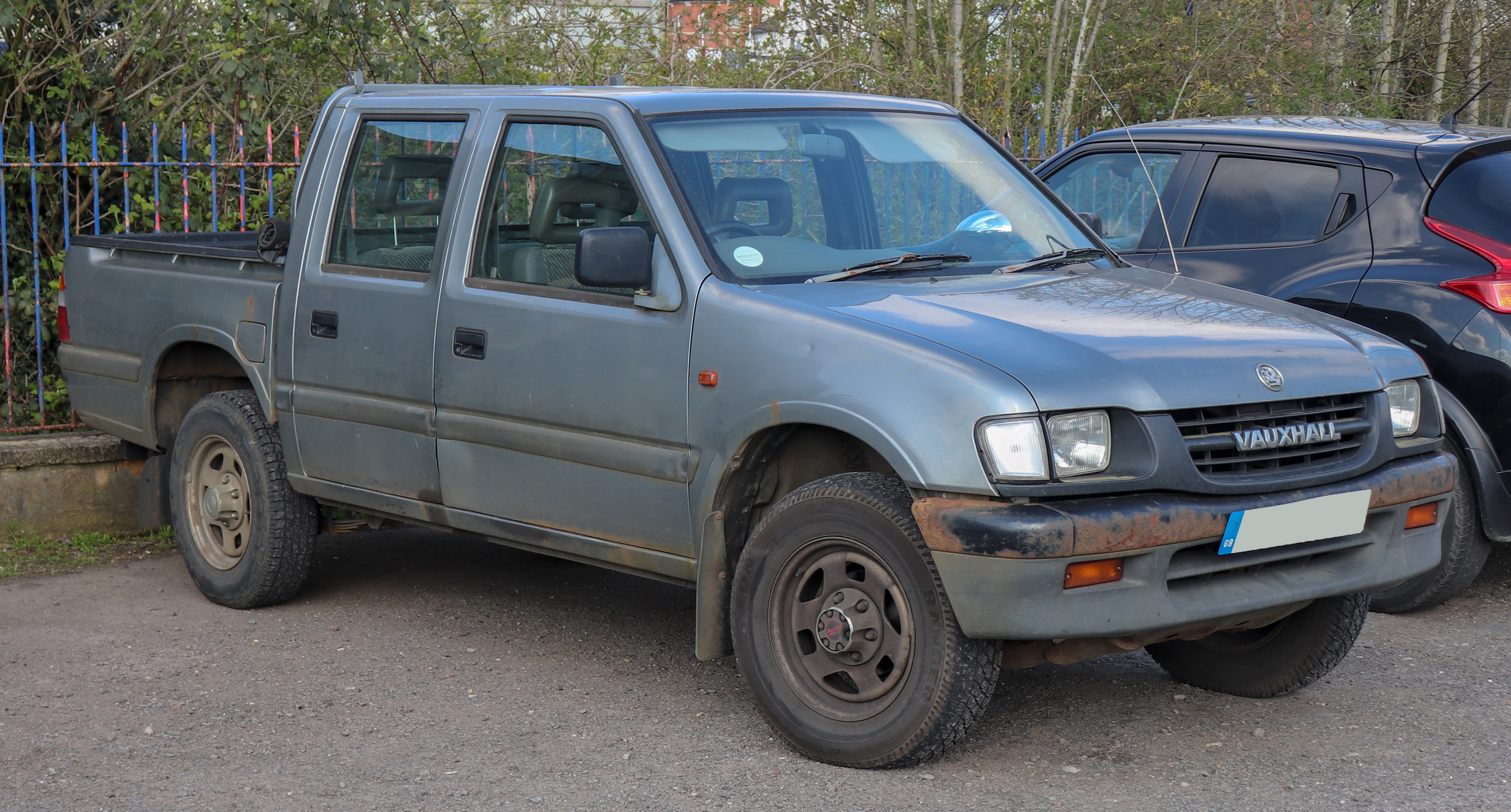
1999 Vauxhall Brava

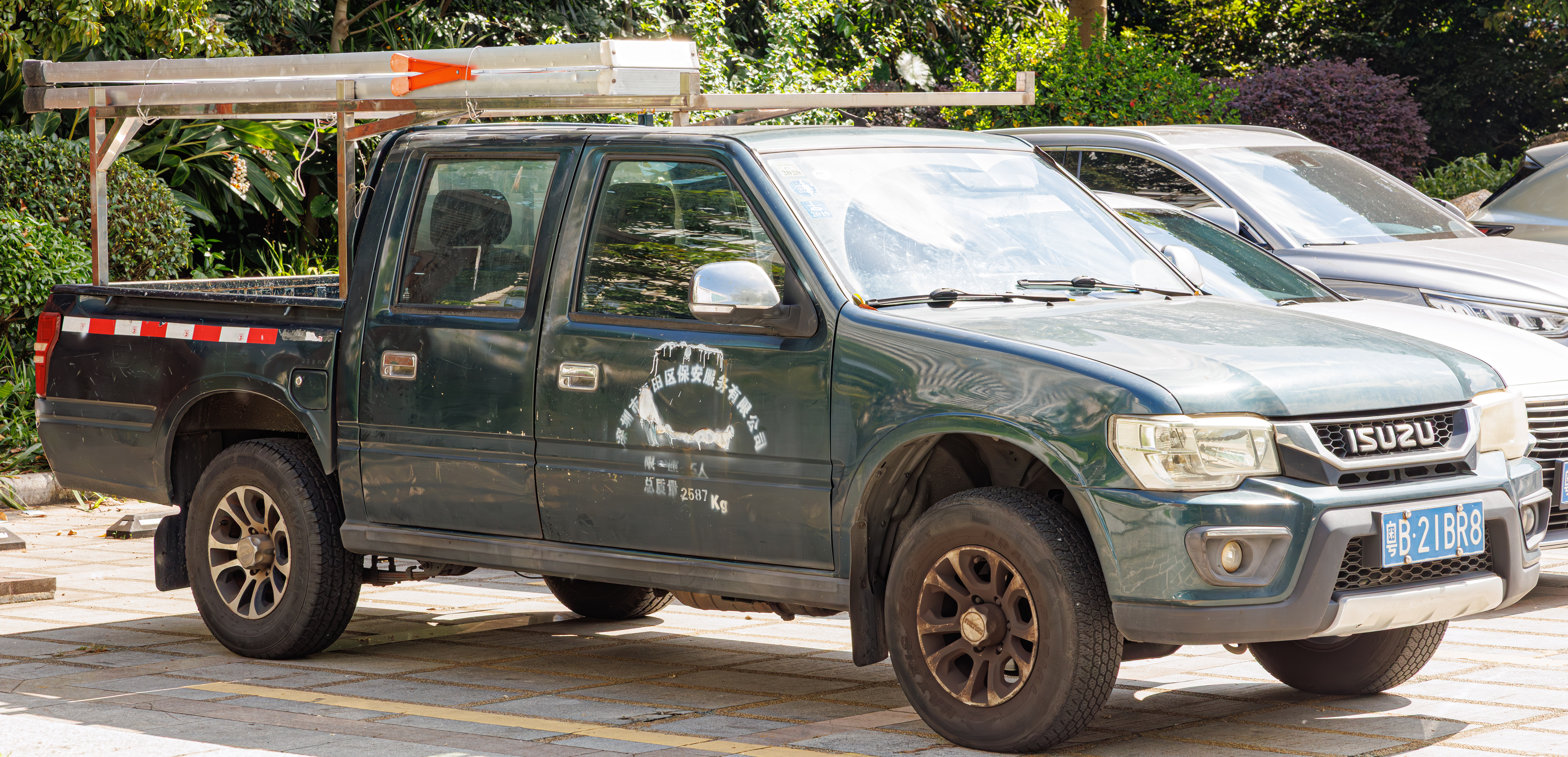
2016 Qingling-Isuzu TF140 Front view (second facelift)

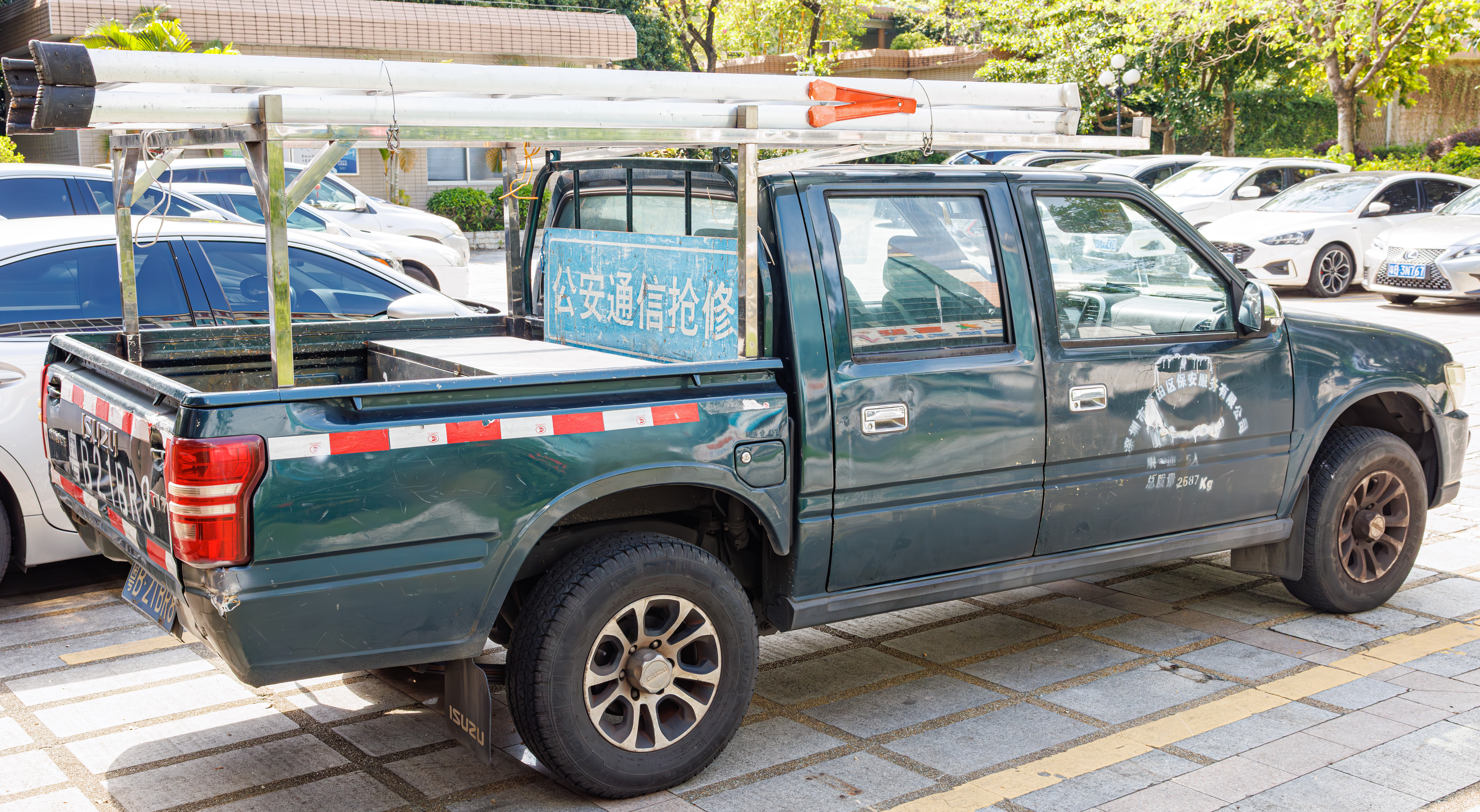
2016 Qingling-Isuzu TF140 Rear view (second facelift)

KB Rodeo	Released
Initial release	Jan-81
1983 upgrade	Dec-82
1984 upgrade	Feb-84
1985 upgrade	Jul-85
1986 upgrade	Mar-86
1987 upgrade	Apr-87
