= General Motors de Chile =

General Motors de Chile S.A. GM Chile
- Company type: Subsidiary
- Industry: Automotive
- Founded: 1974
- Headquarters: Santiago, Chile
- Area served: Chile
- Products: Automobiles
- Brands: Chevrolet
- Parent: General Motors
- Website: chevrolet.cl

General Motors de Chile is the Chilean subsidiary of General Motors. It is located in the city of Santiago, in the commune of Huechuraba (Ciudad Empresarial).

== History ==
General Motors de Chile is one of the subsidiaries of the American automotive conglomerate General Motors. It was officially established in 1974, when the appearance of the brand GM Chile originated at the beginning of the brand's representation and sale operations, which subsequently, some of its models would be assembled, under the Chevrolet brand, and some of which were of Japanese origin (Chevrolet LUV Cabmax), of Opel (Opel Corsa), and others were and are currently imported from GM manufacturing plants in the region (as from the Colombia (Colmotores), Ecuador (GM OBB), Argentina, and Brazil).

The assembly plant in Arica was closed in July 2008. Its final product was the Chevrolet D-Max pickup truck. The GM plant in Arica was the last light vehicle assembly plant in Chile.

There is still a small factory at GM Chile headquarters in Huechuraba that assembles Isuzu N- & F-series commercial trucks from semi-knocked down kits (SKD) under the Chevrolet brand. This factory has a production capacity of 2,000 units per year, expandable to 3,000.

== Models ==
=== Assemblies ===
- Chevrolet Luv Cabmax
- Chevrolet Forward (Serie F)

=== Imported ===
- Chevrolet Aveo
- Chevrolet Tacuma/Vivant
- Chevrolet Epica
- Chevrolet Sail
- Chevrolet Tracker
- Chevrolet TrailBlazer
- Chevrolet Blazer
- Chevrolet Tahoe
- Opel Corsa
- Opel Meriva
