= Thai Rung Union Car =

Thai automobile manufacturer

Thai Rung Union Car Public Co., Ltd
- Native name: ไทยรุ่ง
- Company type: Public
- Traded as: SET: TRU
- ISIN: TH0454A10Z04
- Industry: Automobile manufacturing
- Founded: 1967; 59 years ago
- Founder: Vichien Phaoenchoke
- Headquarters: Nong Khang Plu, Nong Khaem, Bangkok 10160
- Key people: Pranee Phaoenchoke (chairman & president); Sompong Phaoenchoke (CEO)
- Products: Tooling, auto parts production and assembly
- Revenue: ▲2,577 million baht (2018)
- Net income: ▲181 million baht (2018)
- Total assets: ▲3,927 million baht (2018)
- Total equity: ▲3,268 million baht (2018)
- Website: thairung.co.th

Thai Rung Union Car (Thai: ไทยรุ่ง), formerly known as Thai Motor Corporation (THAMCO), is the first Thai-based automobile manufacturer, established in 1967 to assemble Leyland vehicles and later Isuzu, Toyota, Nissan, and Chevrolet-badged models, as well as those under its own brand.

== History ==
=== 1967–1994: Thai Motor Corporation ===
The company was established by Vichien Phaoenchoke in 1967 as Thai Motor Corporation (THAMCO) and began assembling Leyland vehicles. After Leyland's decline, THAMCO switched its business to assembling Isuzu, Toyota, Nissan, and Chevrolet vehicles in the 1980s and 1990s.

=== 1994–present: Thai Rung Union Car ===
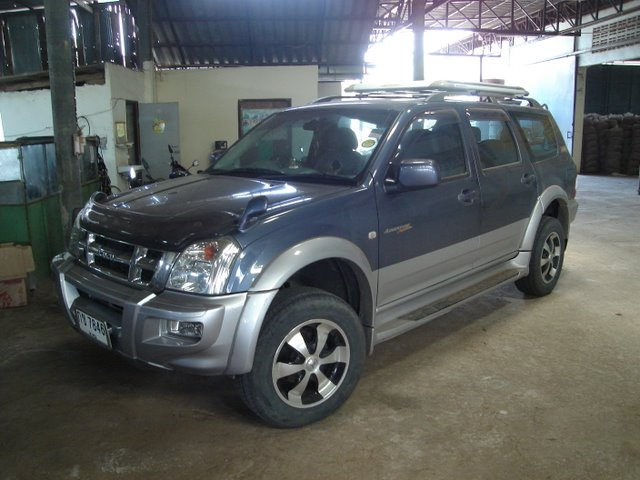
Thairung Adventure Master, based on the Isuzu D-Max

The company was first listed on the Stock Exchange of Thailand on 21 November 1994, after it changed its name from THAMCO. It remains 70% owned by the Phaoenchoke family, with Sompong Phaoenchoke as its CEO.

== Models ==
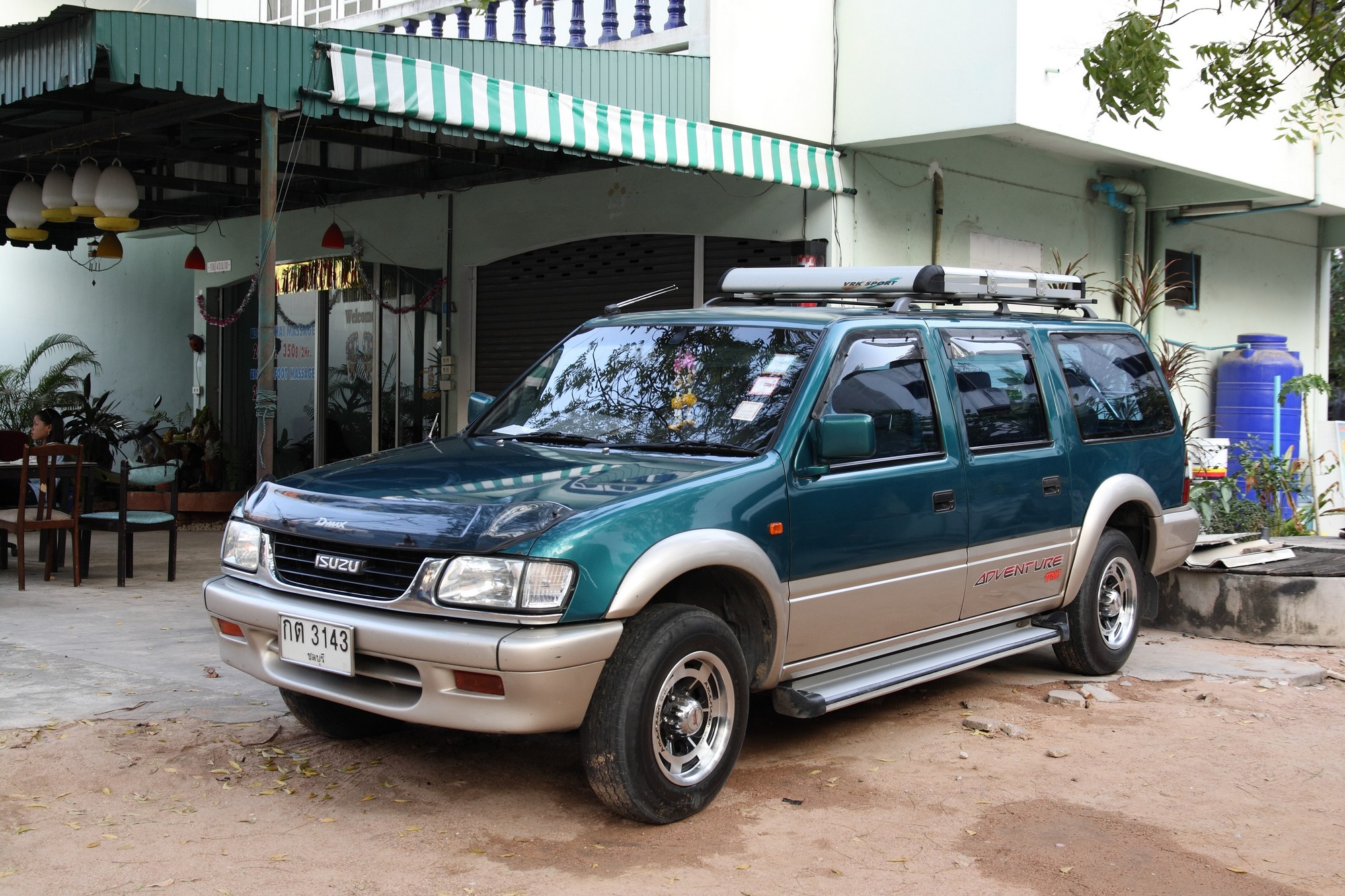
The Isuzu TF-based "Adventure" was replaced in 2004.

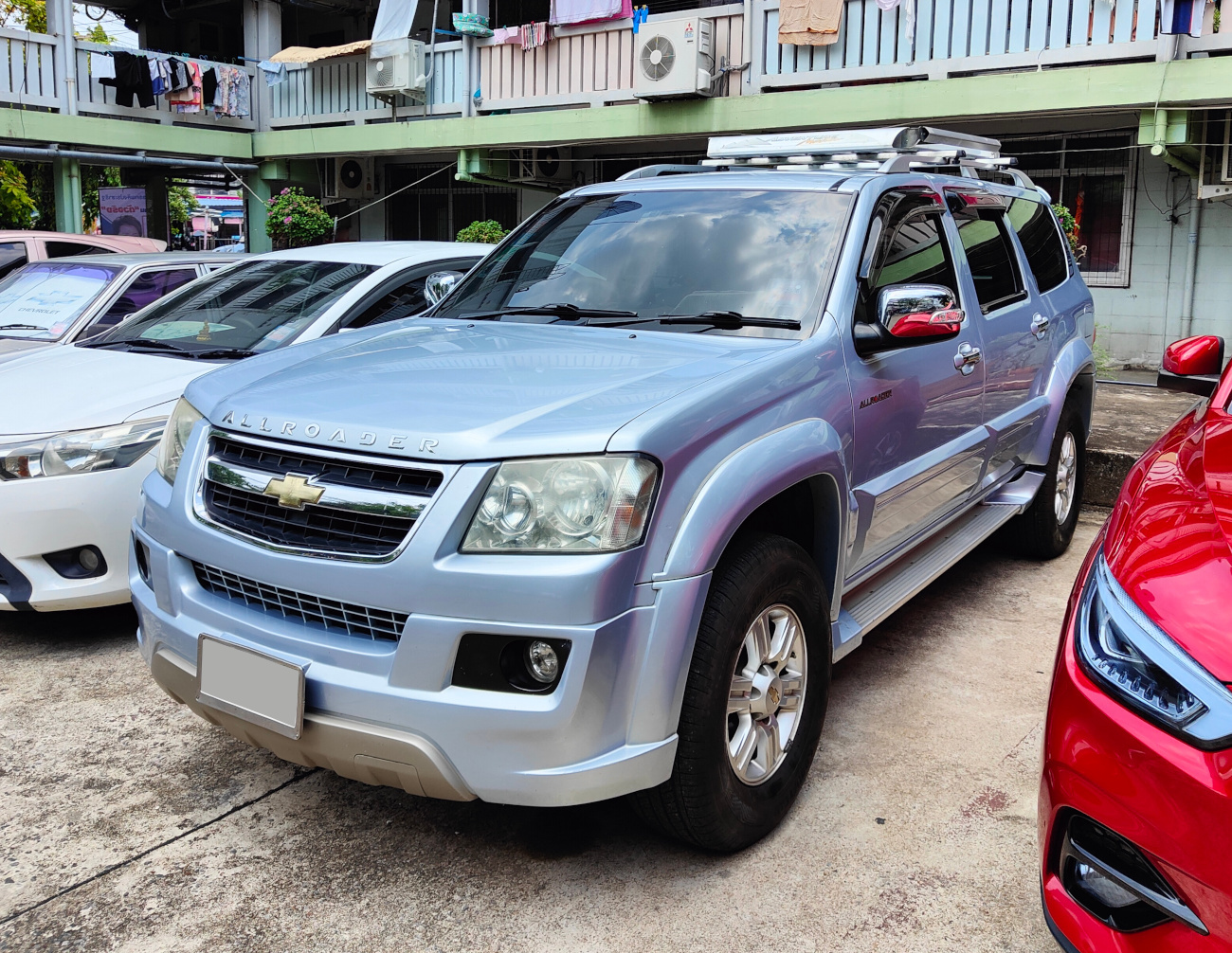
Thairung Allroader

=== Lineup ===
- TR Transformer II (2019)
- TR MUV4 (military vehicle for the Royal Thai Army), based on the Toyota Hilux Vigo and the Isuzu D-Max
- TR Transformer, based on the Toyota Hilux Vigo
  - TR Transformer Plus4
  - TR Transformer Max
- TR Transformer II, based on the Toyota Hilux Revo
  - TR Transformer Max
- TR Traveller, first minibus in Thailand based on the Isuzu NPR/Journey Minibus and Nissan Diesel Condor (2nd Generation)/Civilian Minibus
  - TR Traveller Max, TR Traveller II

=== Discontinued ===
- Isuzu Stationwagon (1979–1983), based on the Isuzu KB
- Isuzu KB Stationwagon (1982–1991), based on the Isuzu KB
- Isuzu Victor (1986–1997), based on the Isuzu TF
- Isuzu Buddy (1982–2002), based on the Isuzu TF and Isuzu WFR
- Isuzu Supreme (1992–2002), based on the Isuzu TF
- Isuzu Adventure (1993–1997), based on the Isuzu TF
- Isuzu Wanderer (1993–1997), based on the Isuzu TF
- Isuzu Tripper (1996–2002), based on the Isuzu TF Dragon Eyes / Dragon Power
- TR Grand Adventure (1997–2002), based on the Isuzu TF Dragon Eyes / Dragon Power
- TR Adventure Master (2002–2012), based on the Isuzu D-MAX
- TR Adventure II (2008-2012), based on the Isuzu D-MAX
  - TR Adventure Sport (2006–2012), based on the Isuzu D-MAX (including the Isuzu 4JJ1-TC engine)
  - TR Adventure Elegance (2006–2012), based on the Isuzu D-MAX (including the Isuzu 4JJ1-TC engine)
  - TR Adventure Sport EX (2006–2012), based on the Isuzu D-MAX (including the Isuzu 4JJ1-TC engine)
- TR Allroader (2007–2012), based on the Chevrolet Colorado
- TR Exclusive Limousine (2009–2012), based on the Isuzu D-MAX and Chevrolet Colorado
- TR Xciter (1995–2005), based on the Nissan D22 BIG-M FRONTIER
- TR Super Xciter (2002–2008), based on the Nissan D22 (including the Nissan TD27 & Nissan ZD30DDT engine)
- TR Freelife (2002–2008), based on the Nissan D22 (including the Nissan TD27 & ZD30DD engine)
- TR Superior (1991–1998), based on the Toyota Hilux
- TR Vanner (1987–1996) based on the Toyota Hilux Hero and Isuzu WFR
- TR Passport (1996–2002) based on the Isuzu TF And Nissan D21
- TR Super-Tant (1979–1986) based on the Isuzu Elf (TL) and Toyota Dyna (BU35)
- Cheetah Truck (1979-1984) based on the Isuzu Elf (TL) and Toyota Dyna (BU35)
- Cheetah Minibus (1979–1986) based on the Isuzu Elf (TL) and Toyota Dyna (BU35)
