= Chevrolet LUV =

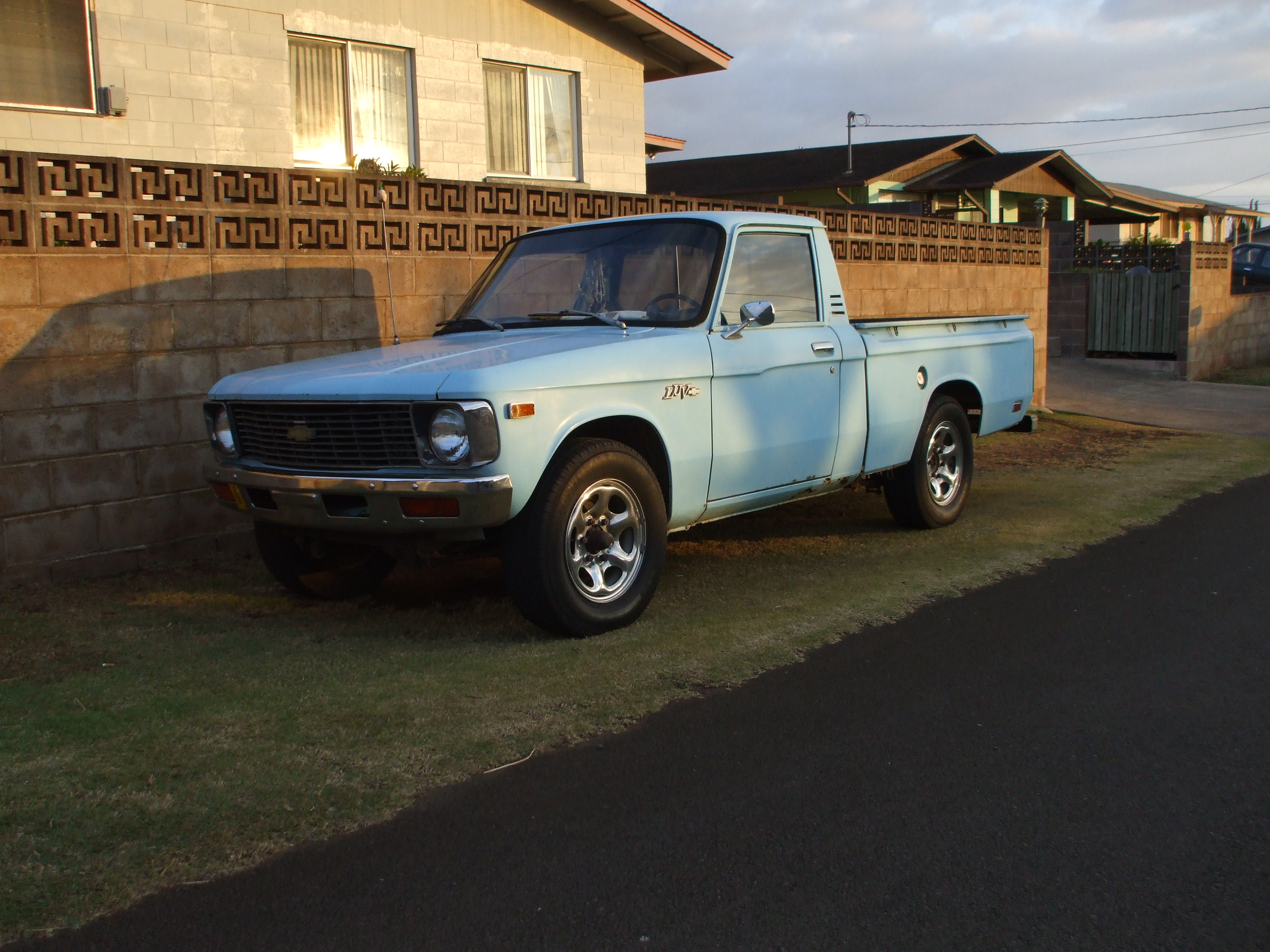
Chevrolet LUV

The Chevrolet LUV and the later Chevrolet LUV D-Max were light pickup trucks designed and manufactured by Isuzu and marketed in the Americas since 1972 by Chevrolet over four generations as rebadged variants of the Isuzu Faster and D-Max.

LUV is an acronym for "light utility vehicle".

== History ==
Production of the first generation of Chevrolet LUVs, first sold in North America from 1972 as a badge-engineered variant of the Japanese-market Isuzu Faster, ended in 1980. The second generation, launched in 1980 as a 1981 model, was produced by Isuzu in Japan for North America and in Chile by General Motors for the South American market. North American sales ended after the release of the 1982 model year Chevrolet S-10 in 1981. The 1981 and 1982 model years were the only years the 2.2 liter diesel engine was offered in the United States.

Production of the second-generation LUV for South America continued until 1988 when the third iteration was released, once more based on the Japanese-market Faster/Rodeo pickups.

This arrangement lasted until 2005 when the fourth series was introduced, now titled Chevrolet LUV D-Max and representing a rebadged version of the Isuzu D-Max.

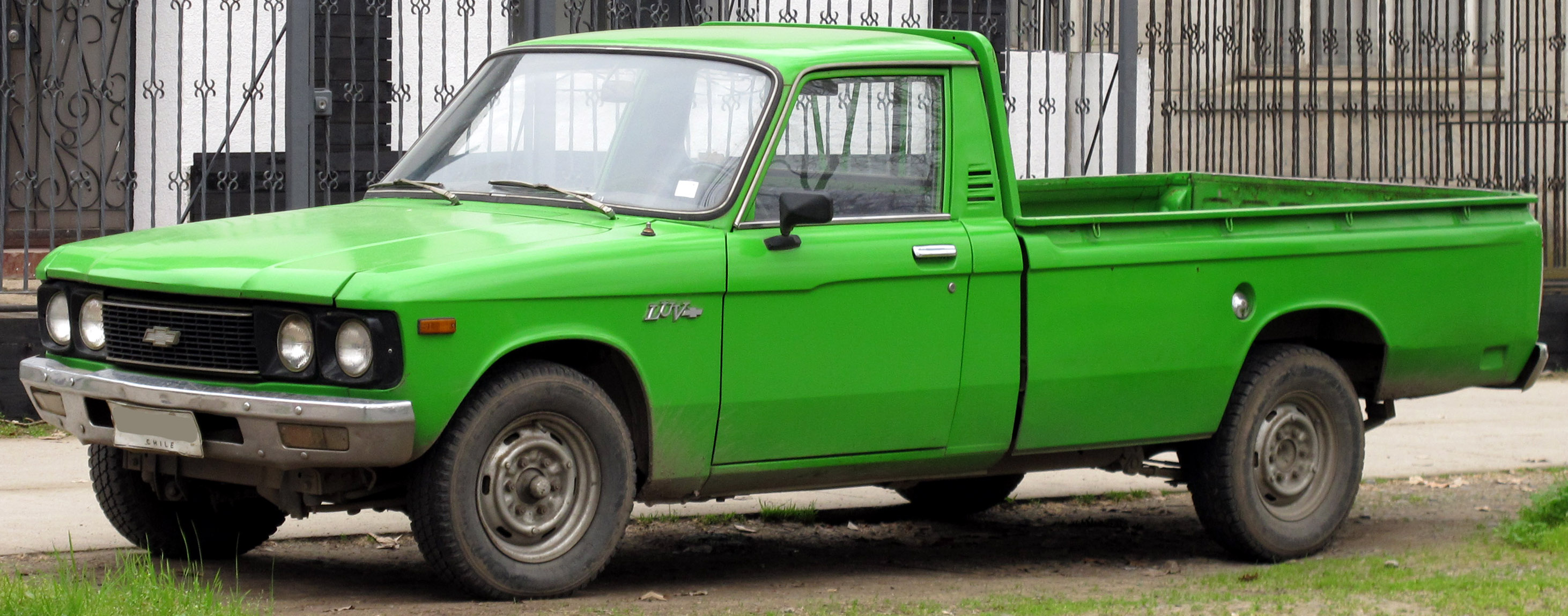
First generation (1972–1980)

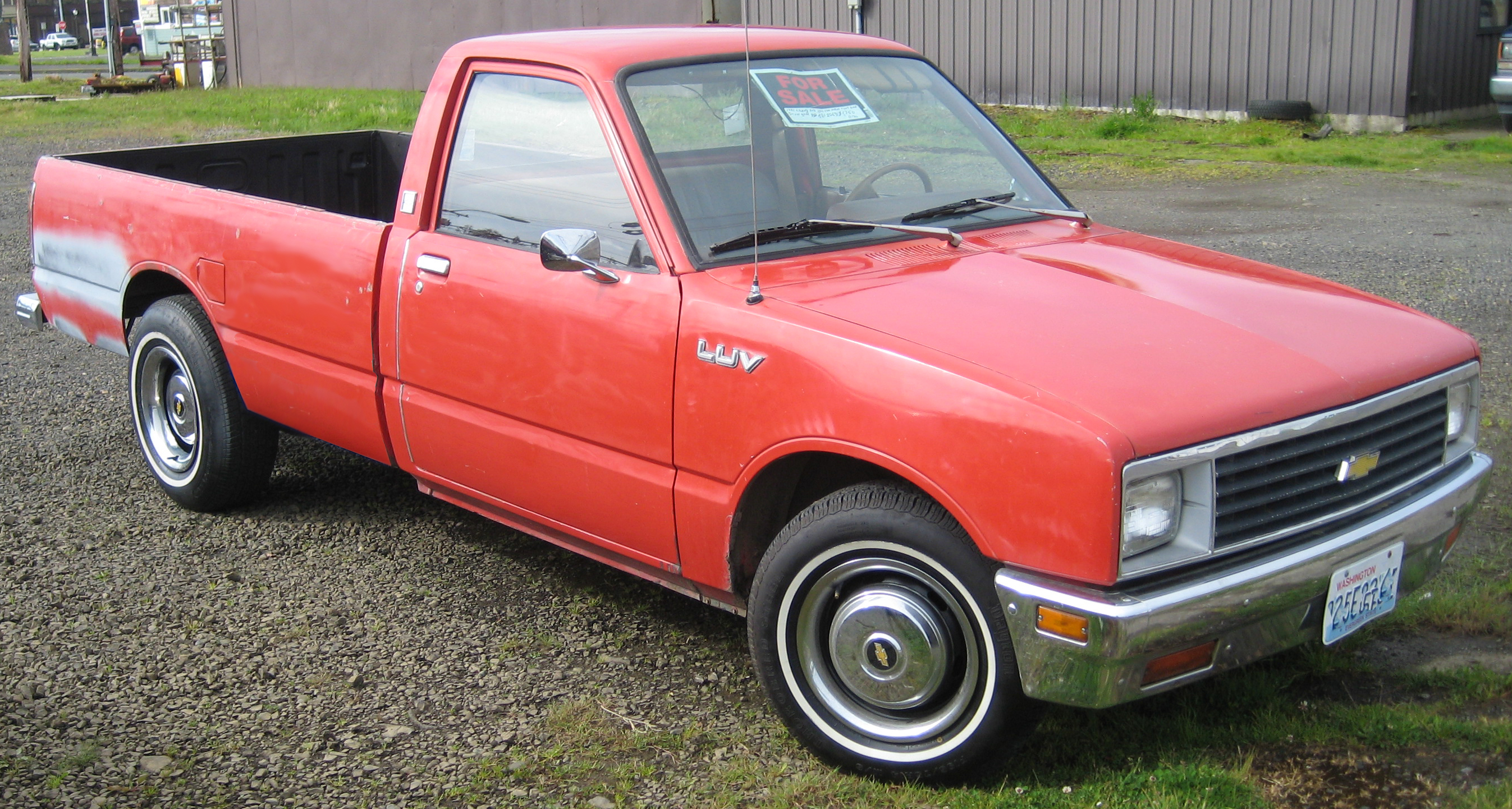
Second generation (KB; 1980–1988)

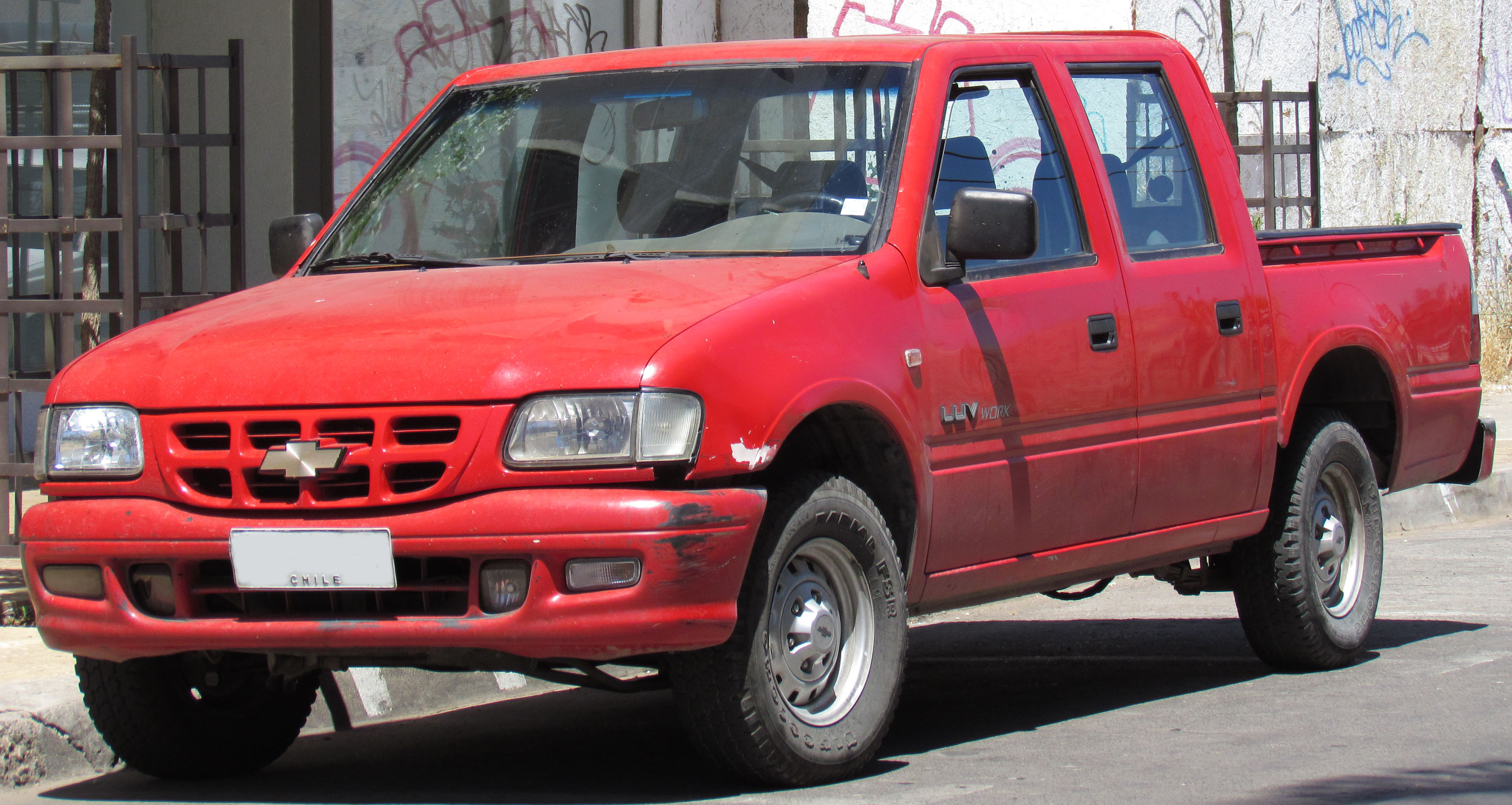
Third generation (TF; 1988–2005)

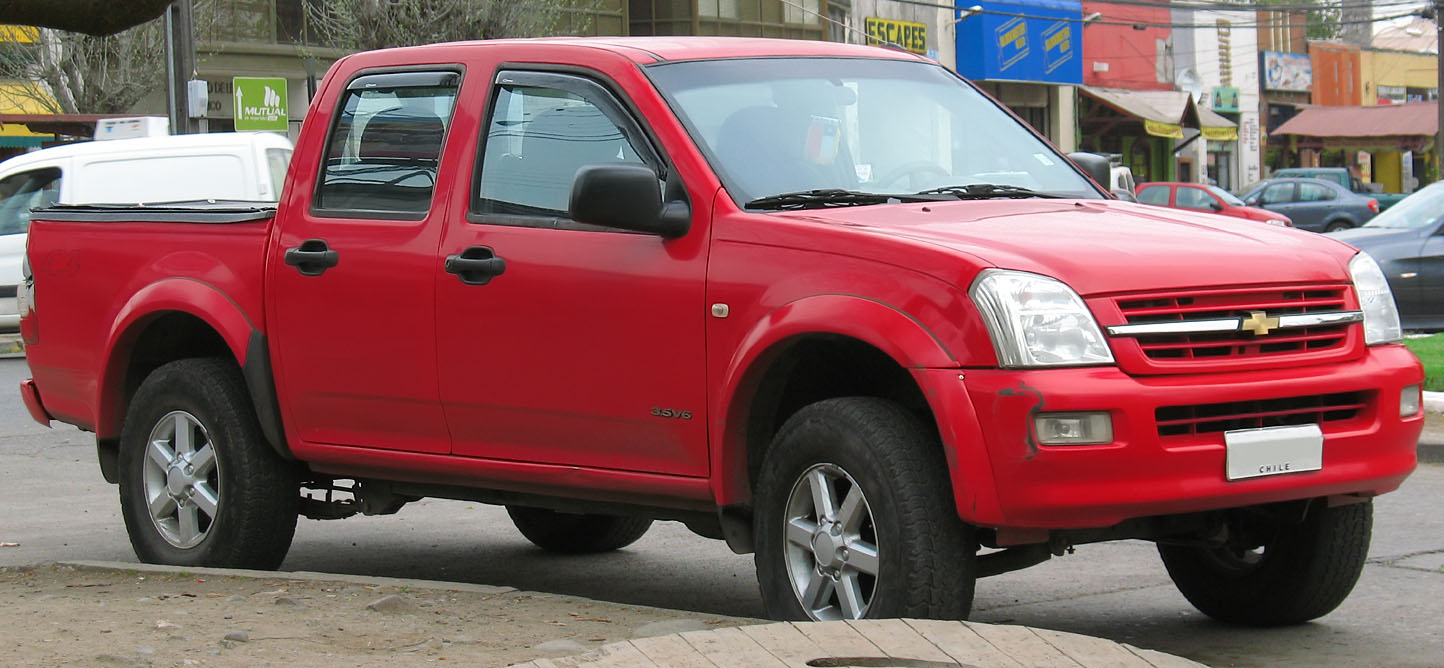
Chevrolet LUV D-Max (RA; 2005–2012)
