= Holden EJ =

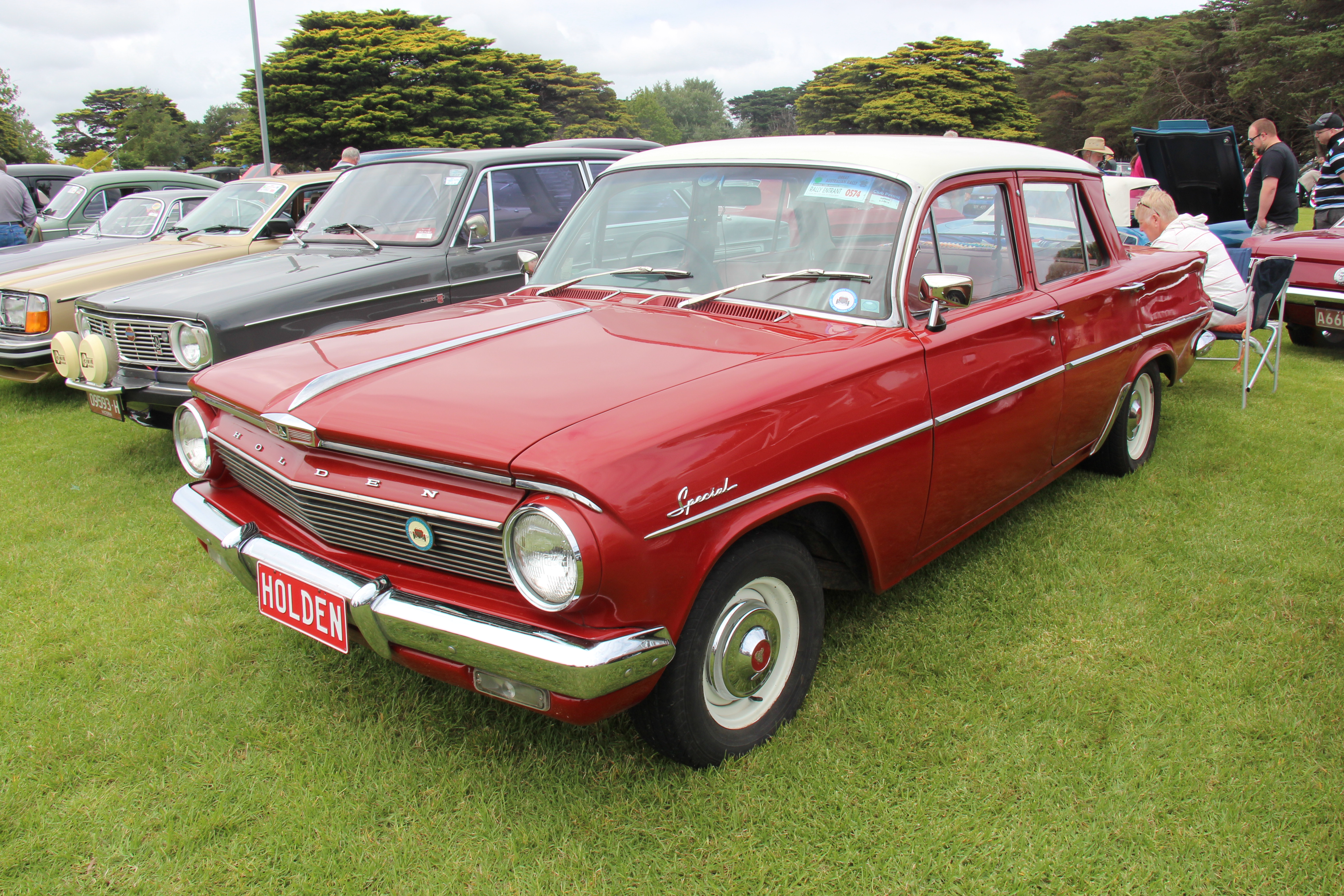
- Holden Special Sedan

Overview
- Manufacturer: Holden
- Also called: Holden Standard; Holden Special; Holden Premier; Holden Utility; Holden Panel Van
- Production: Sedan & Station Sedan: July 1962 – August 1963; Utility & Panel Van: January–August 1963
- Designer: Alf Payze, Stan Parker

Body and chassis
- Class: Mid-size
- Body style: 4-door sedan 5-door station wagon 2-door coupé utility 2-door panel van
- Layout: FR layout
- Related: Opel Kapitän

Powertrain
- Engine: 2.3L GMH 138 Inline 6
- Transmission: 3-speed manual 3-speed "Hydra-Matic" automatic

Dimensions
- Wheelbase: 105.0 inches (2667 mm)
- Length: 176.9 inches (4493 mm)
- Width: 68.0 inches (1727 mm)
- Height: 58.0 inches (1473 mm)
- Kerb weight: Standard Sedan: 2492lb (1130 kg)

Chronology
- Predecessor: Holden EK
- Successor: Holden EH

The Holden EJ is a motor vehicle produced by Holden in Australia from 1962 to 1963. Introduced in July 1962, the EJ replaced the Holden EK series.

== Overview ==
The styling of the EJ was a radical departure from that of the EK, with a lower roofline, a flatter boot and an absence of fins. Improvements were made to the brakes, front suspension and the Hydra-matic automatic transmission.

A new luxury model, the Holden Premier, made its debut in the EJ series, and featured leather interior, bucket seats, metallic paint, a heater/demister with centre console, and arm rests on all four doors. It was fitted with Hydra-matic 3-speed automatic transmission as standard equipment, which was optional on other EJ series models.

== Model range ==
On introduction, the EJ range consisted of four-door sedans in three trim levels and five-door station wagons in two trim levels. A two-door coupe utility and a two-door panel van were added to the range in January 1963. The seven models were marketed as follows:

- Holden Standard Sedan
- Holden Special Sedan
- Holden Premier Sedan
- Holden Standard Station Sedan
- Holden Special Station Sedan
- Holden Utility
- Holden Panel Van
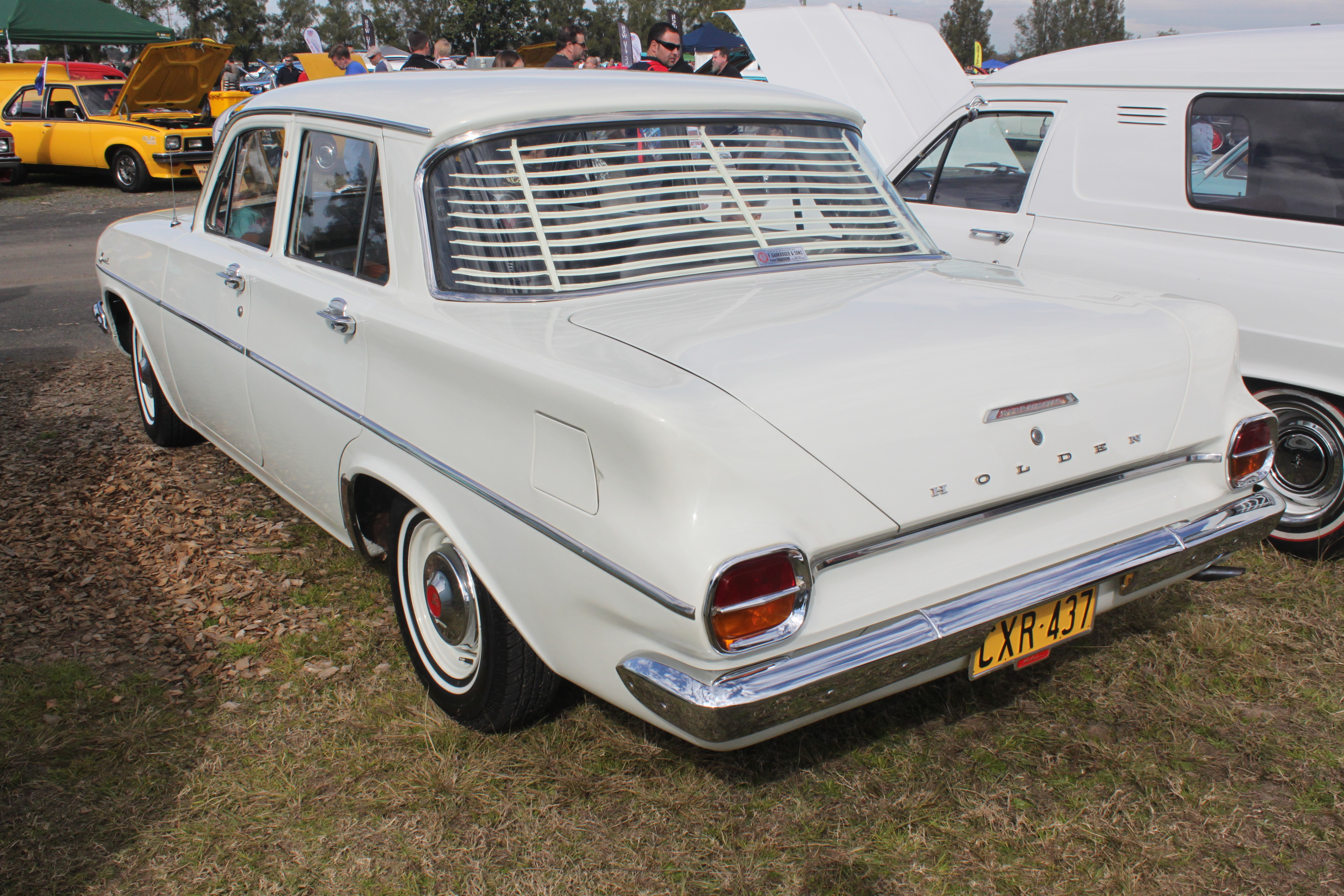
Holden Special Sedan

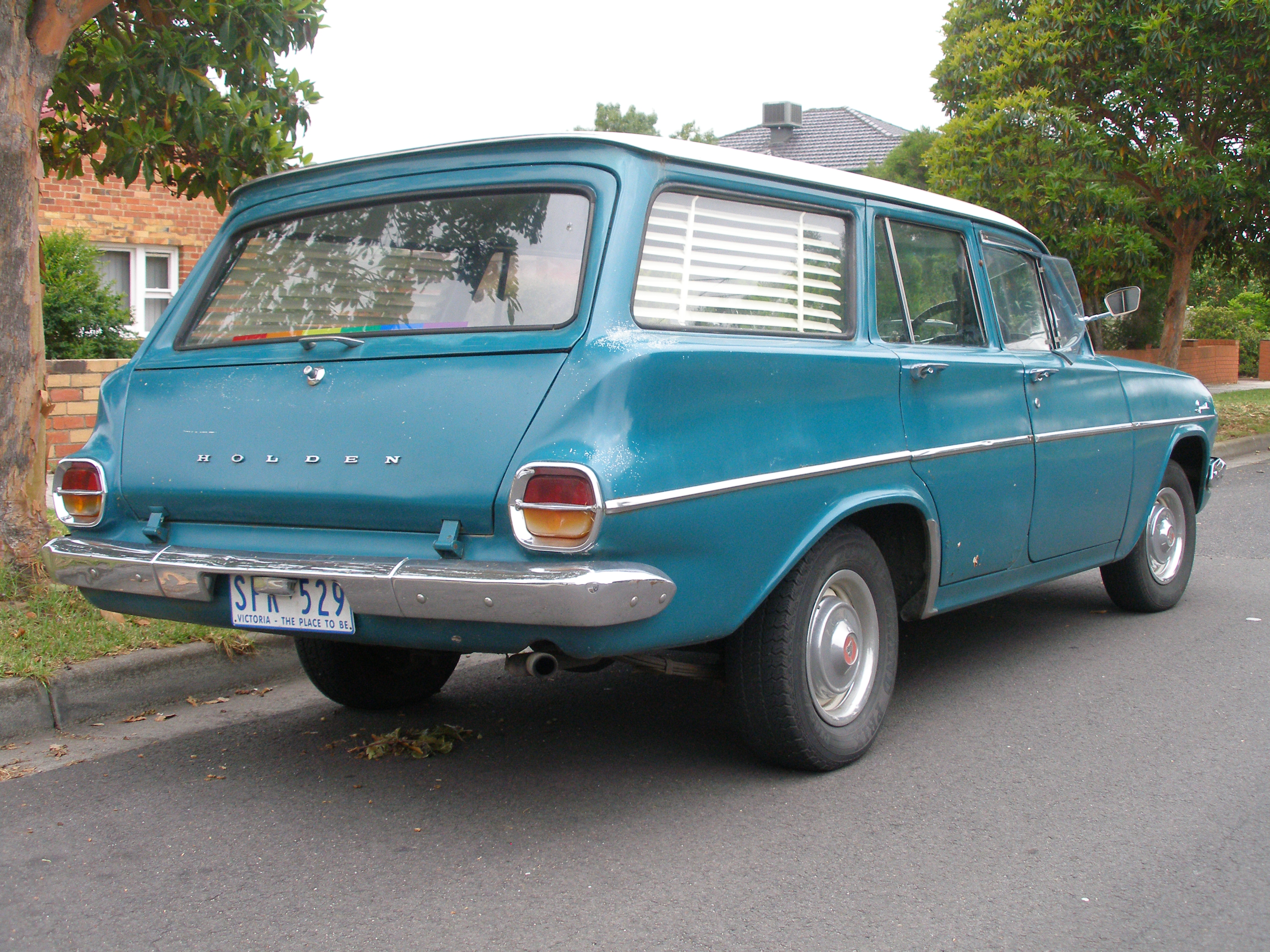
Holden Special Station Sedan

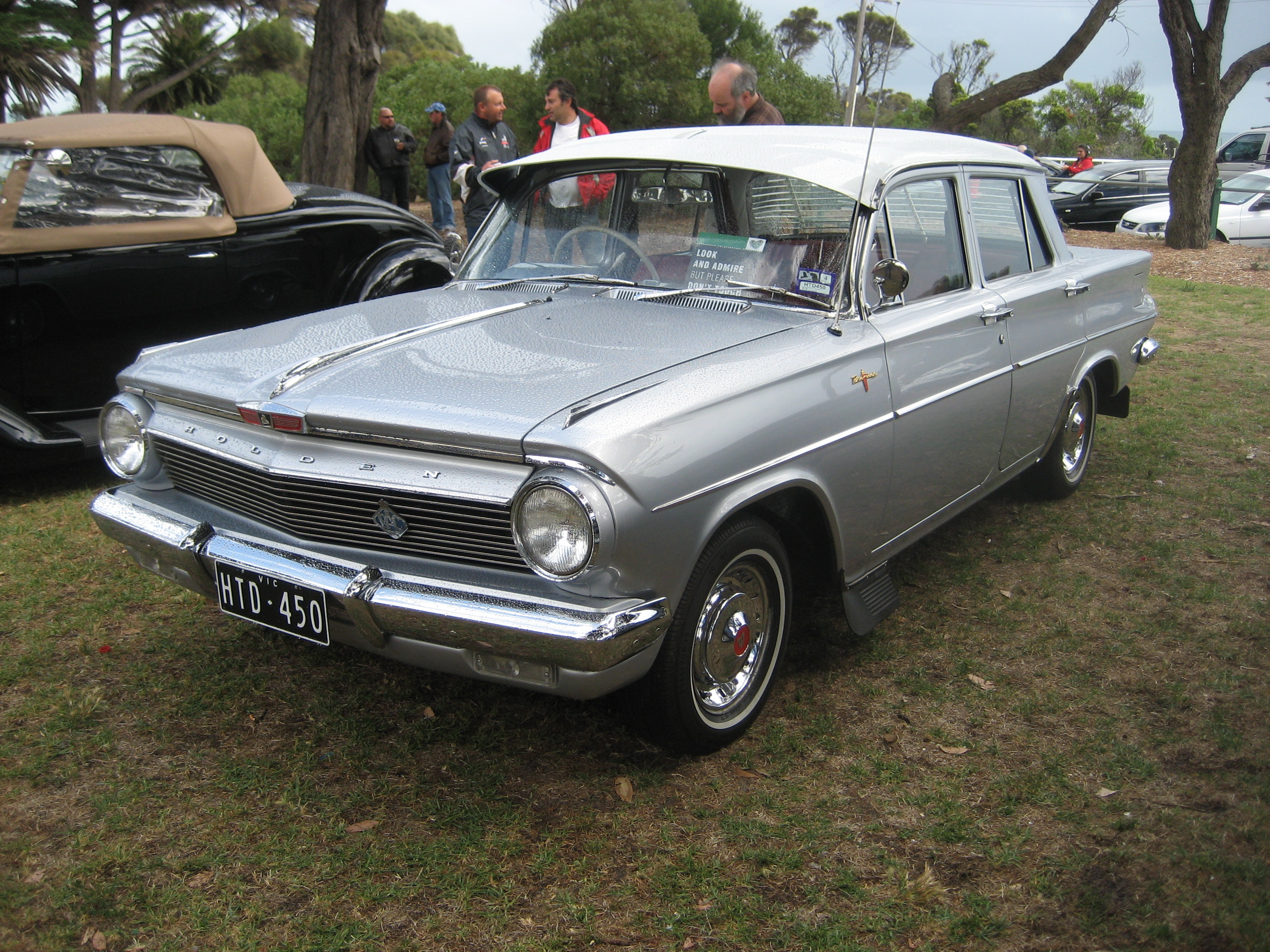
Holden Premier Sedan

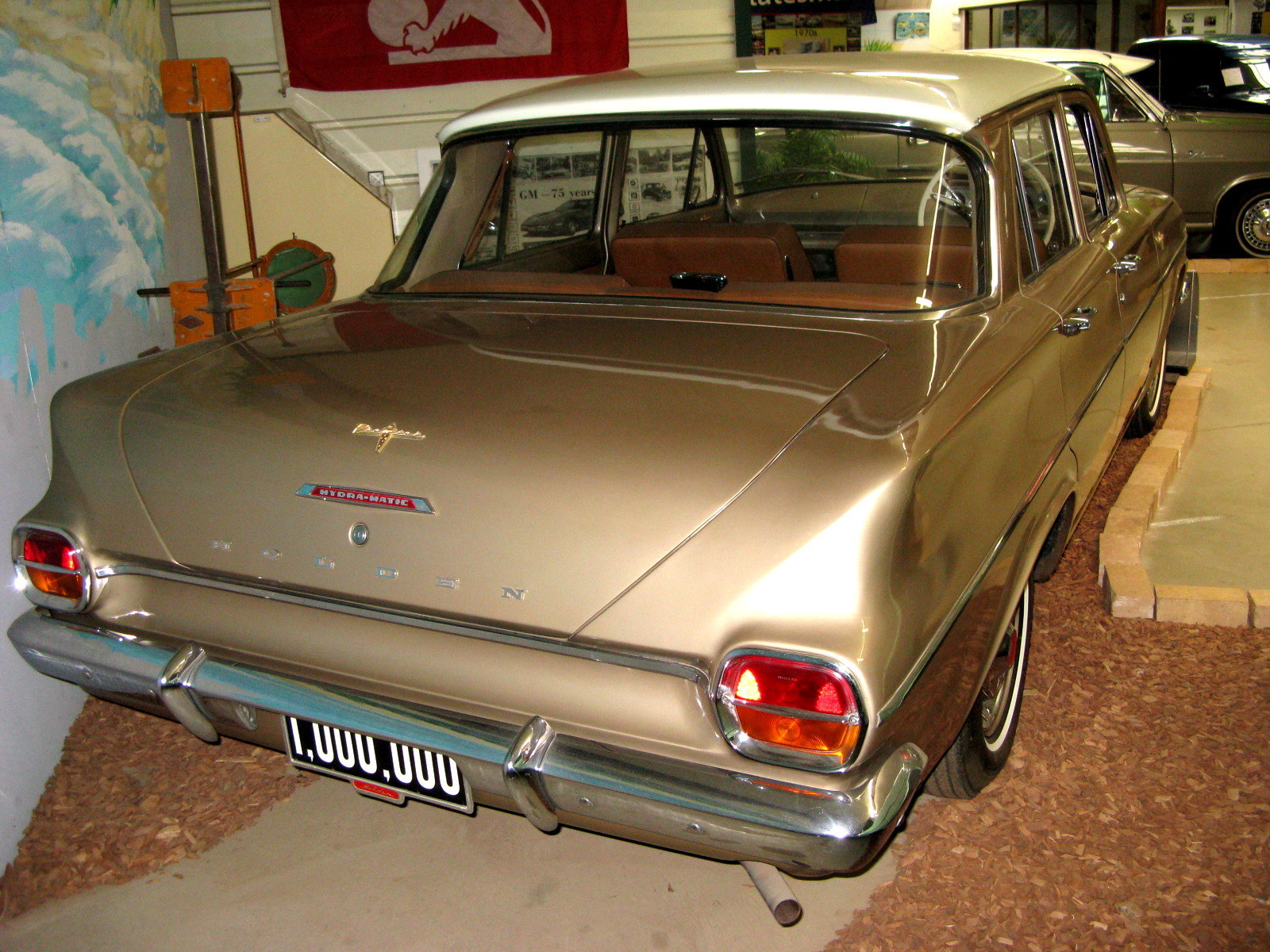
Holden Premier Sedan

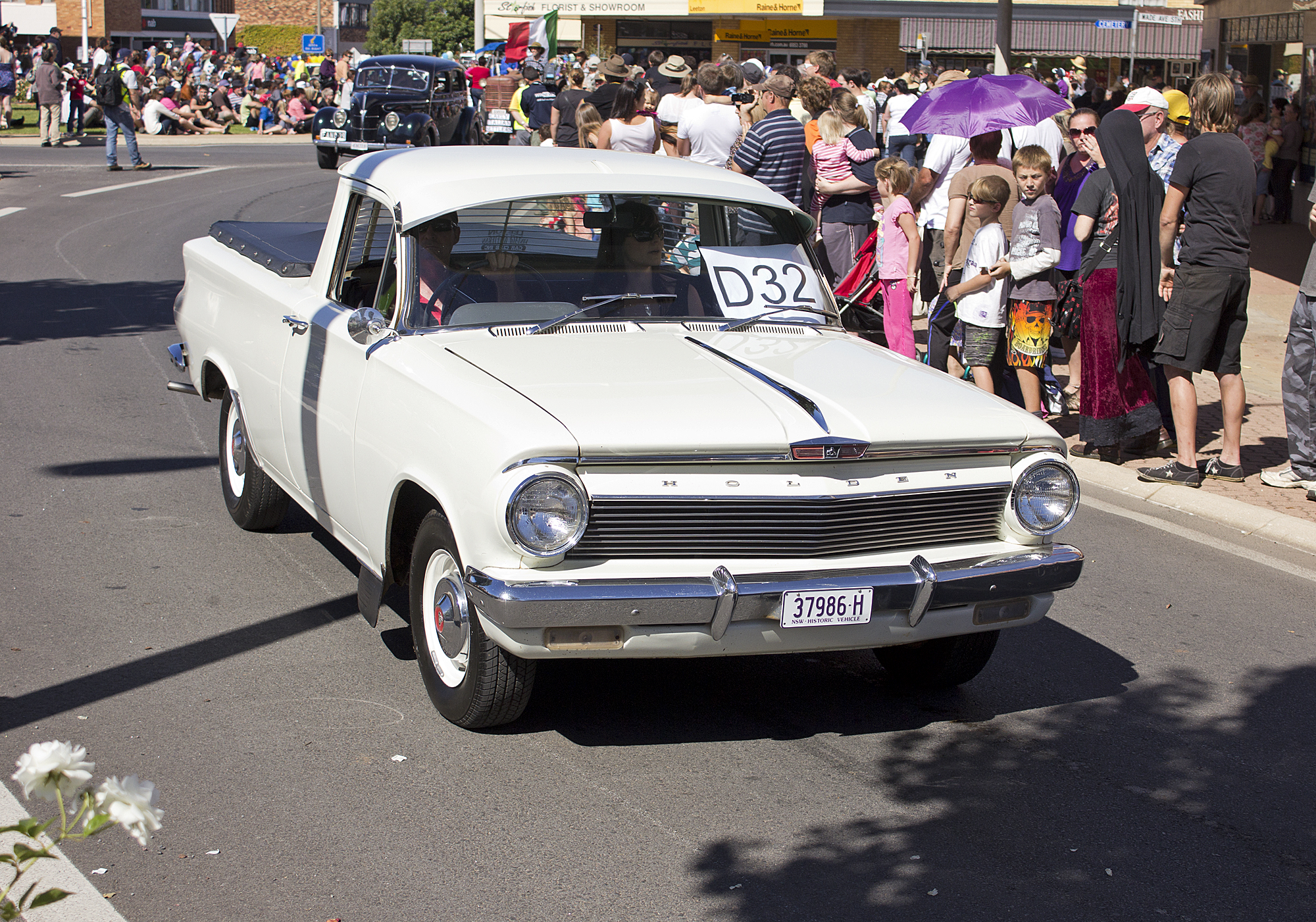
Holden Utility

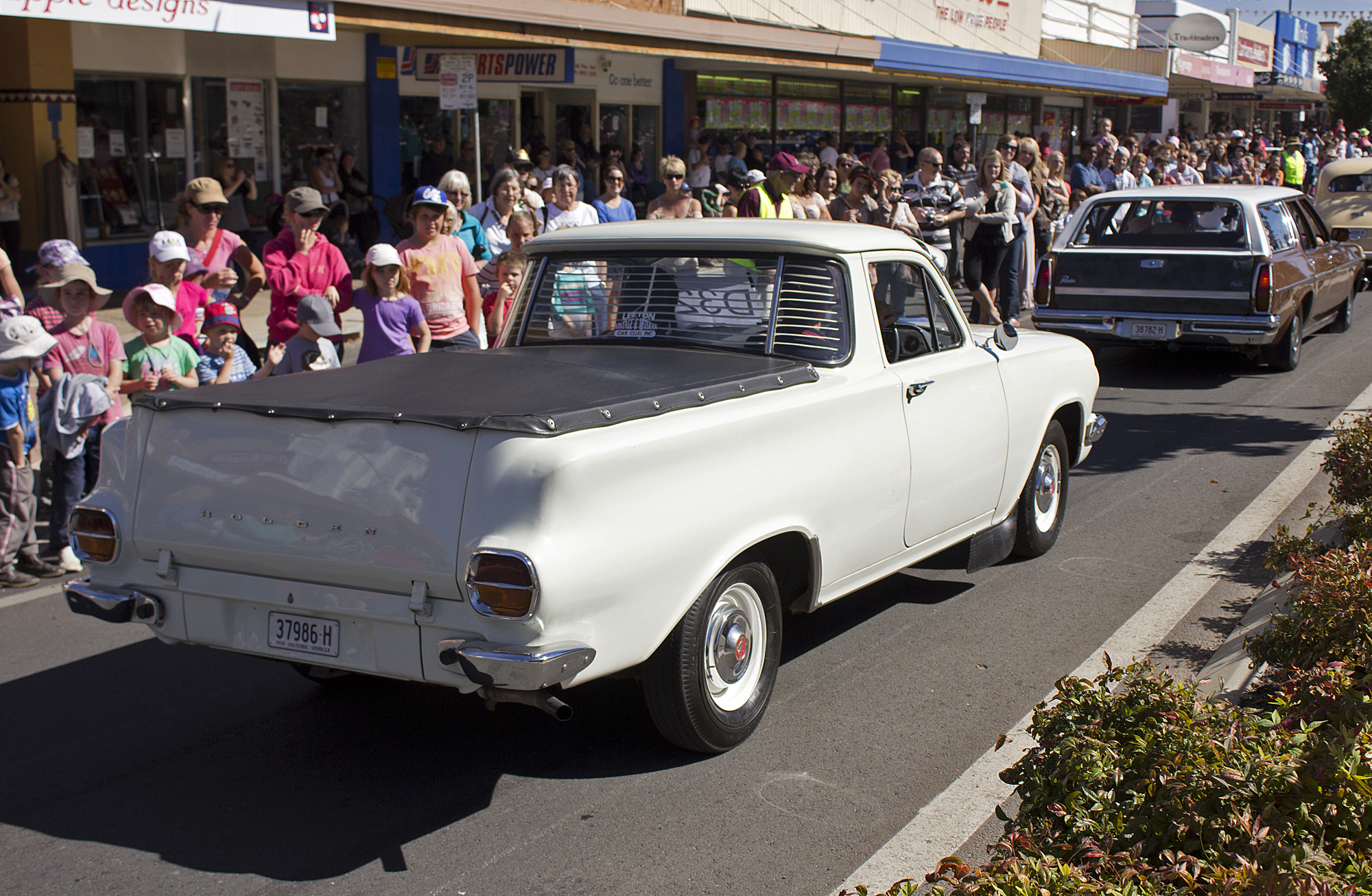
Holden Utility

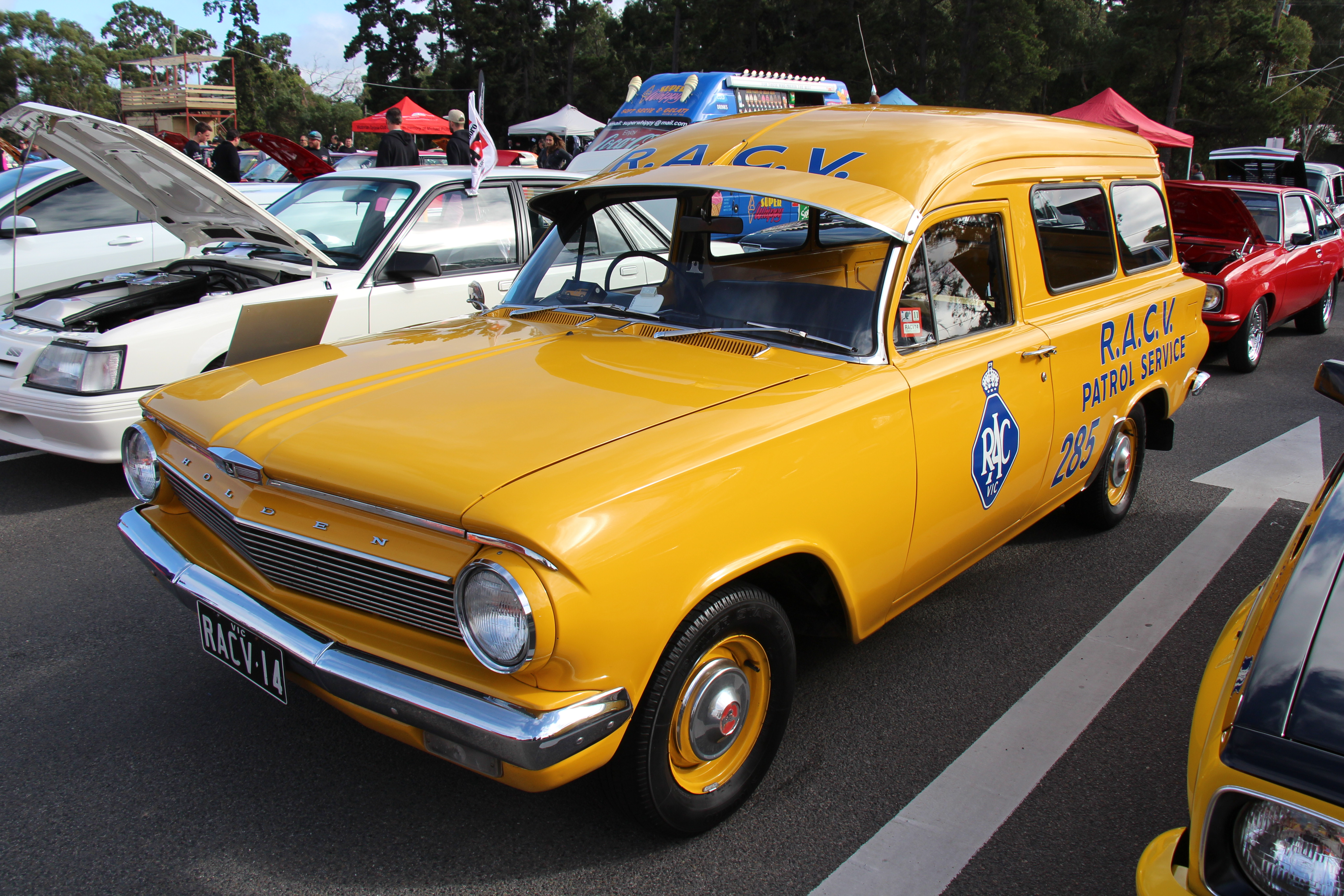
Holden Panel Van

== Engines ==
All EJ models were powered by a 138-cubic-inch (2,262 cc) inline six-cylinder engine, producing 75 bhp (56 kW). Since the introduction of the original Holden 48-215 model in 1948, Holdens had been fitted with what was commonly known as the grey motor. The EJ was the last Holden to be equipped with that engine. The last Grey motor was made on 2 August 1963.

== Production and replacement ==
After a production run of 154,811 vehicles, the EJ was replaced by the Holden EH series in August 1963. The 1,000,000th Holden, an EJ Premier, was produced on 26 October 1962.

The EJ was also assembled in New Zealand by General Motors New Zealand, and was marketed in South Africa as well.
