= Holden HK =

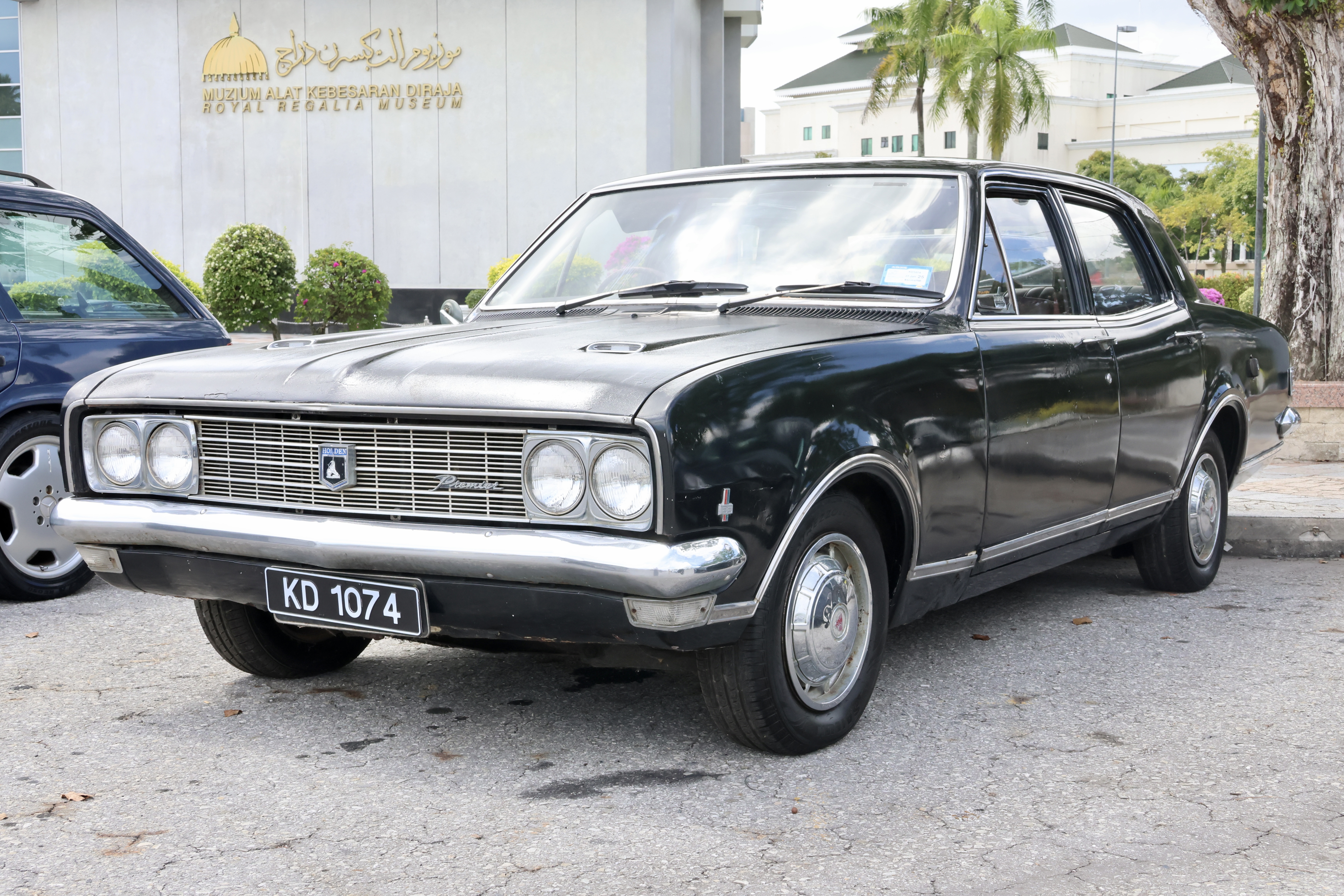
- Holden HK Premier Sedan

Overview
- Manufacturer: Holden
- Also called: Holden Belmont; Holden Kingswood; Holden Premier; Holden Brougham; Holden Monaro; Chevrolet Kommando (South Africa); Chevrolet El Camino (South Africa)
- Production: January 1968 – May 1969
- Designer: John Schinella

Body and chassis
- Class: Mid-size
- Body style: 4-door sedan 5-door station wagon 2-door coupé 2-door coupé utility 2-door panel van
- Layout: FR layout

Powertrain
- Engine: 2.6 L GMH 161 I6; 3.0 L GMH 186/186S I6; 5.0 L Chevrolet 307 V8; 5.4 L Chevrolet 327 V8
- Transmission: 3/4-speed manual 2-speed "Powerglide" automatic

Dimensions
- Wheelbase: 111.0 inches (2819 mm)
- Length: 184.8 in (4,694 mm) (Sedan/Station); 192.1 in (4,880 mm) (Brougham)
- Width: 71.4 inches (1814 mm)
- Height: Sedans: 55.6 inches (1412 mm)
- Kerb weight: Monaro GTS 186S: 2946 lb (1336 kg)

Chronology
- Predecessor: Holden HR
- Successor: Holden HT

The Holden HK series is an automobile which was produced by Holden in Australia from late 1967 to 1969. Introduced in January 1968, the HK range progressively replaced the Holden HR series which had been in production since 1966. HK models were both larger and heavier than their predecessors and the range would ultimately include thirteen different models against the eight in the HR range. The Holden HK was marketed under Belmont, Kingswood, Premier, Brougham and Monaro model names.

== Model range ==
The HK series was initially offered in three trim levels, each available in four-door sedan and five-door station wagon body styles. Sedans and wagons were marketed as sedans and Station Sedans respectively.

- Belmont sedan
- Belmont Station Sedan
- Kingswood sedan
- Kingswood Station Sedan
- Premier sedan
- Premier Station Sedan

The Belmont and Kingswood model names were new for the HK series, replacing the Standard and Special names which had been used by Holden since 1953. The Premier nameplate was retained for the top-of-the-line model, which now featured four headlights and a unique roofline to differentiate it further from its lesser siblings. 161-cubic-inch (2.6-litre) and 186-cubic-inch (3.0-litre) inline six-cylinder engines were carried over from the HR series; however, a 307-cubic-inch (5.0-litre) Chevrolet V8 was now offered as an option on all models, this being the first time that any Holden had been available with a V8 engine.

In March 1968, the HK range was expanded with the release of two coupe utilities and a panel van variant replacing the existing HR series commercial models.

- Belmont utility
- Belmont panel van
- Kingswood utility

Prior to the introduction of the HK models, Holden's commercial vehicles had been marketed simply as the Holden Utility and the Holden panel van.

July 1968 saw the release of an additional HK sedan and three coupe models:

- Brougham
- Monaro
- Monaro GTS
- Monaro GTS 327

The Brougham featured a greater level of luxury than the Premier, which had been the top of the range Holden since the introduction of the nameplate in 1962. The Brougham also featured an overall length 200 millimetres (8 in) greater than the other HK sedans, although this extra length was added to the body only, while the wheelbase remained unchanged at 111 inches. It was equipped with the 307 cubic inch V8 engine as standard. The Monaro models were 2-door coupes, the first such vehicles to be offered by Holden and the Monaro GTS 327 featured a 327 cu in (5.4 L) Chevrolet V8 engine which was not available in any other Holden model but was available in the larger GMH assembled Chevrolet Impala and Pontiac Parisienne.

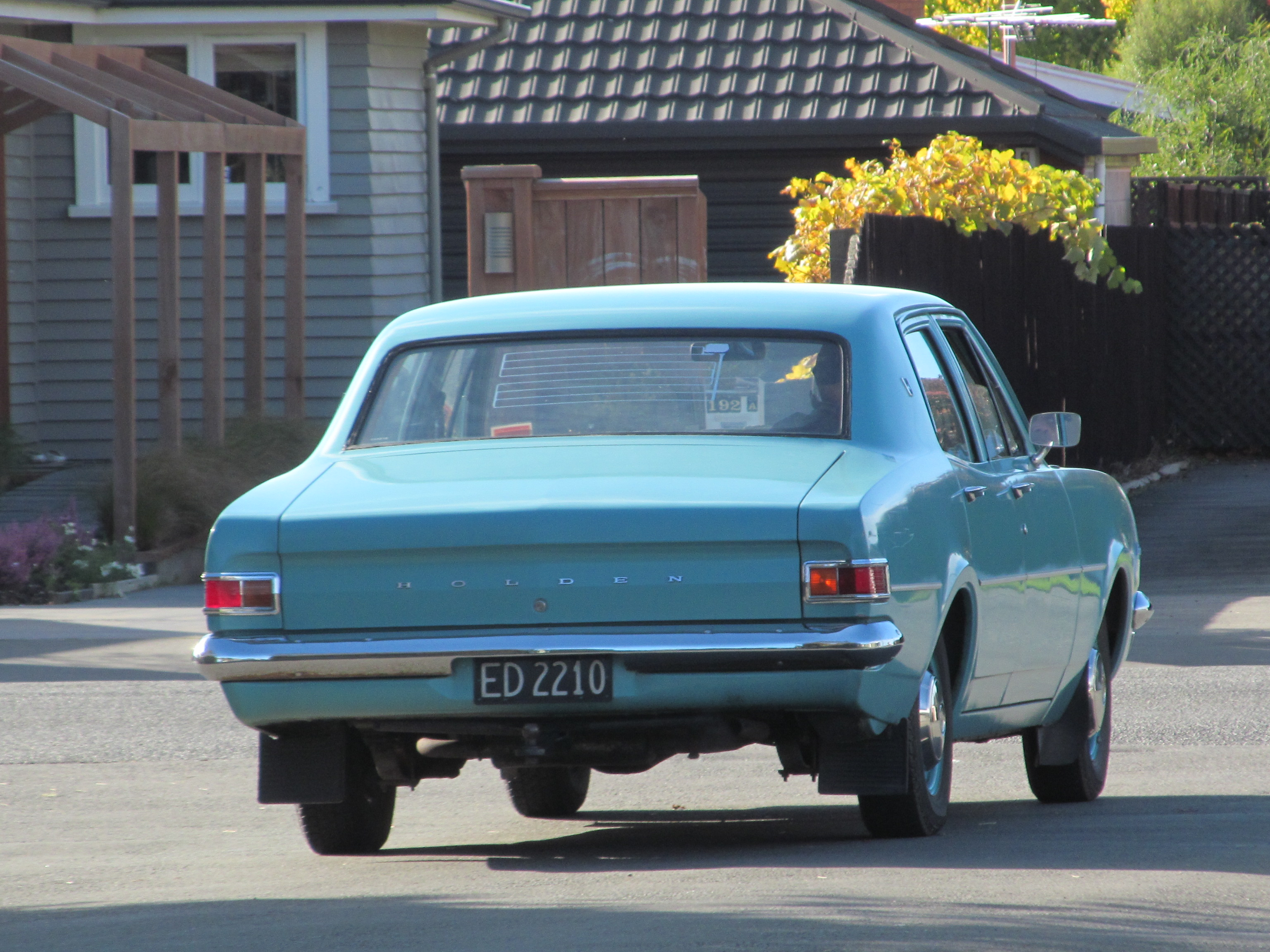
Holden Belmont sedan

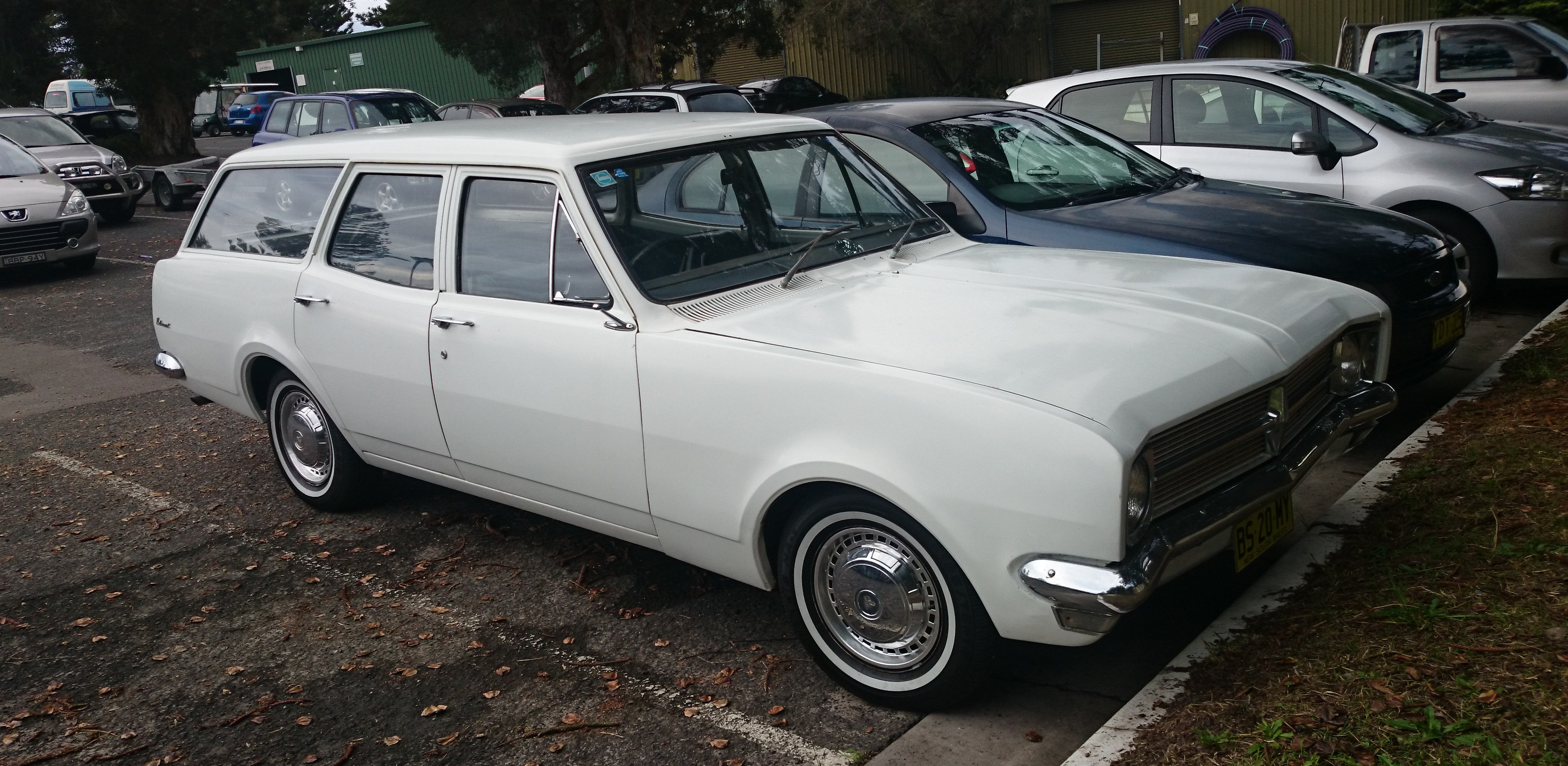
Holden Belmont station sedan

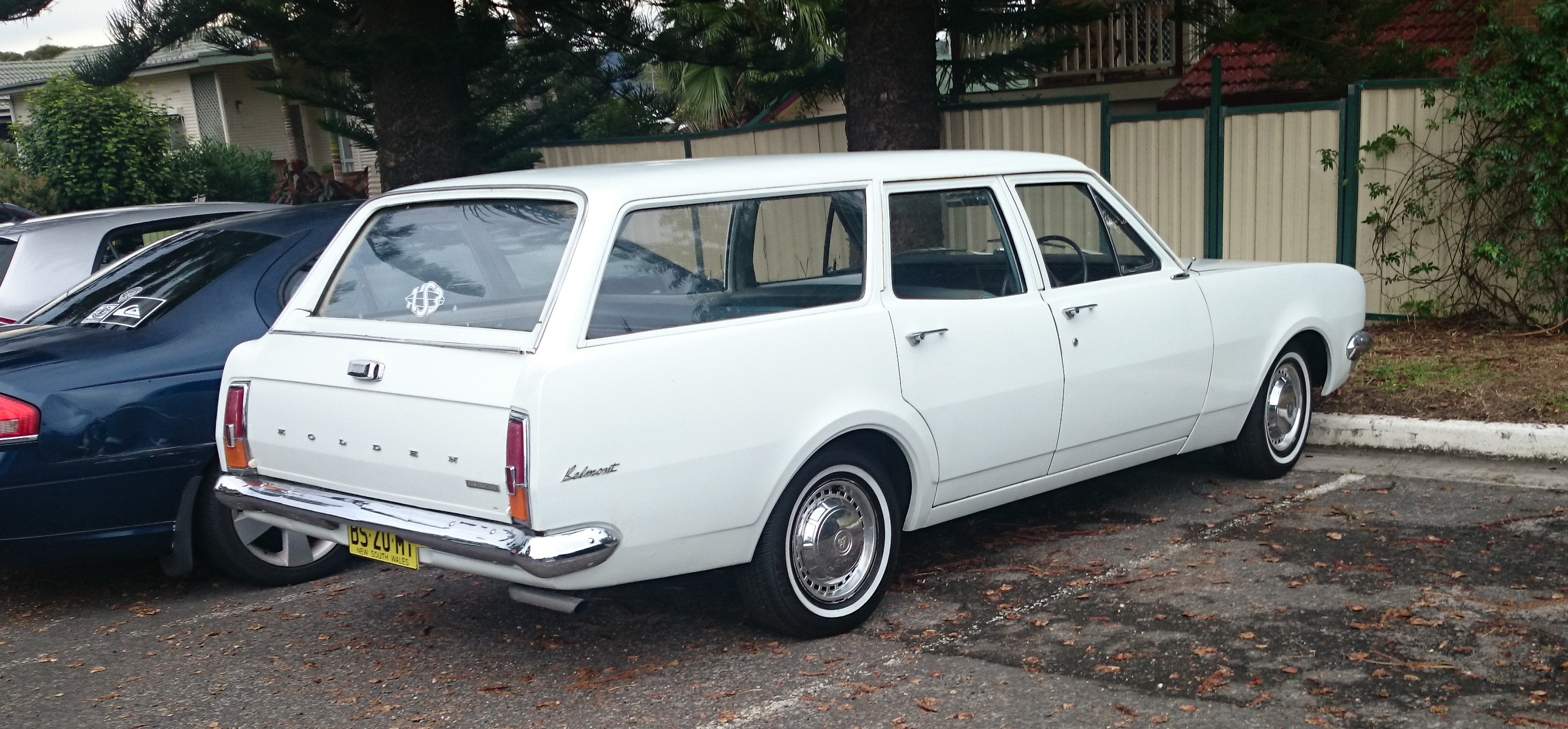
Holden Belmont station sedan

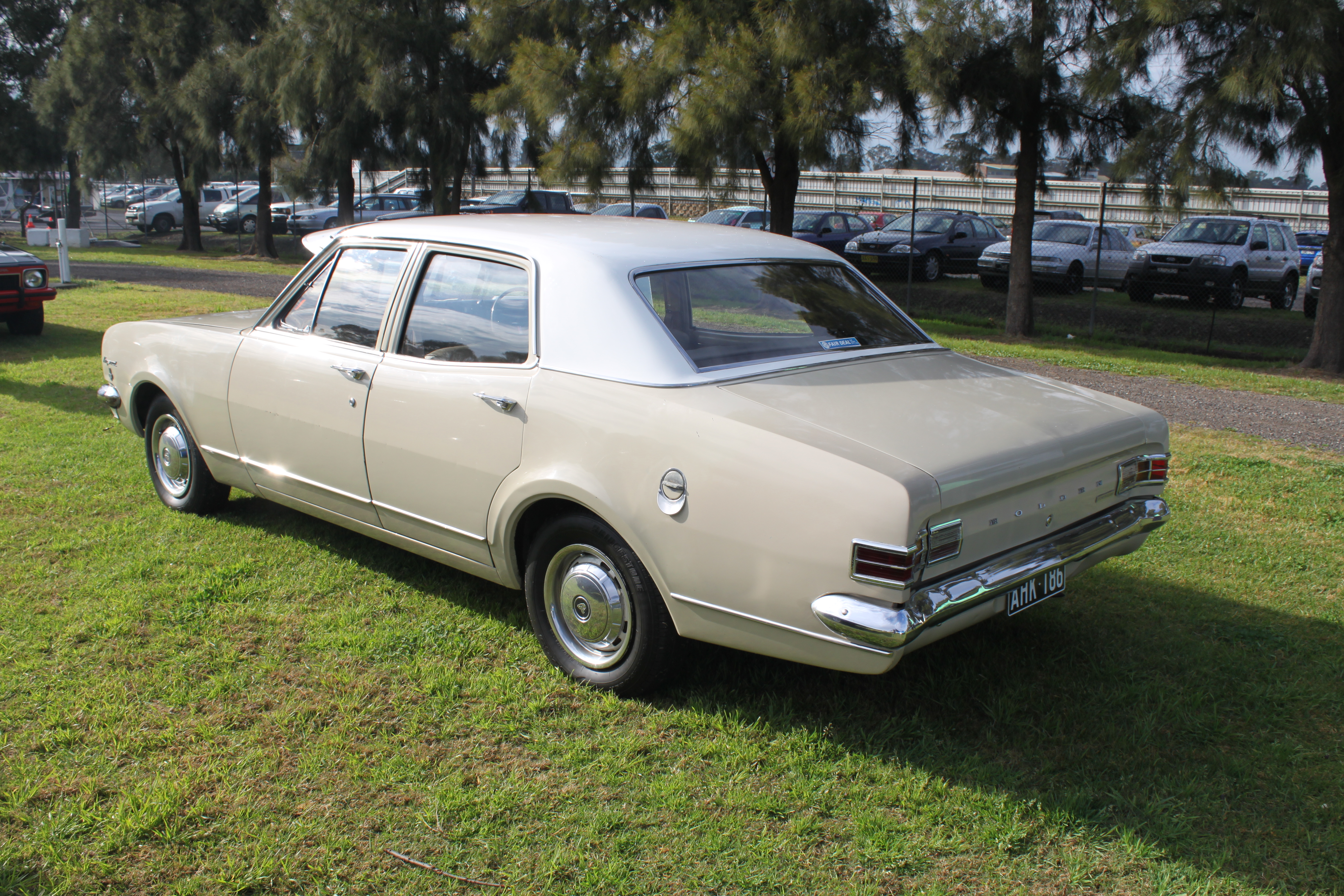
Holden Kingswood sedan

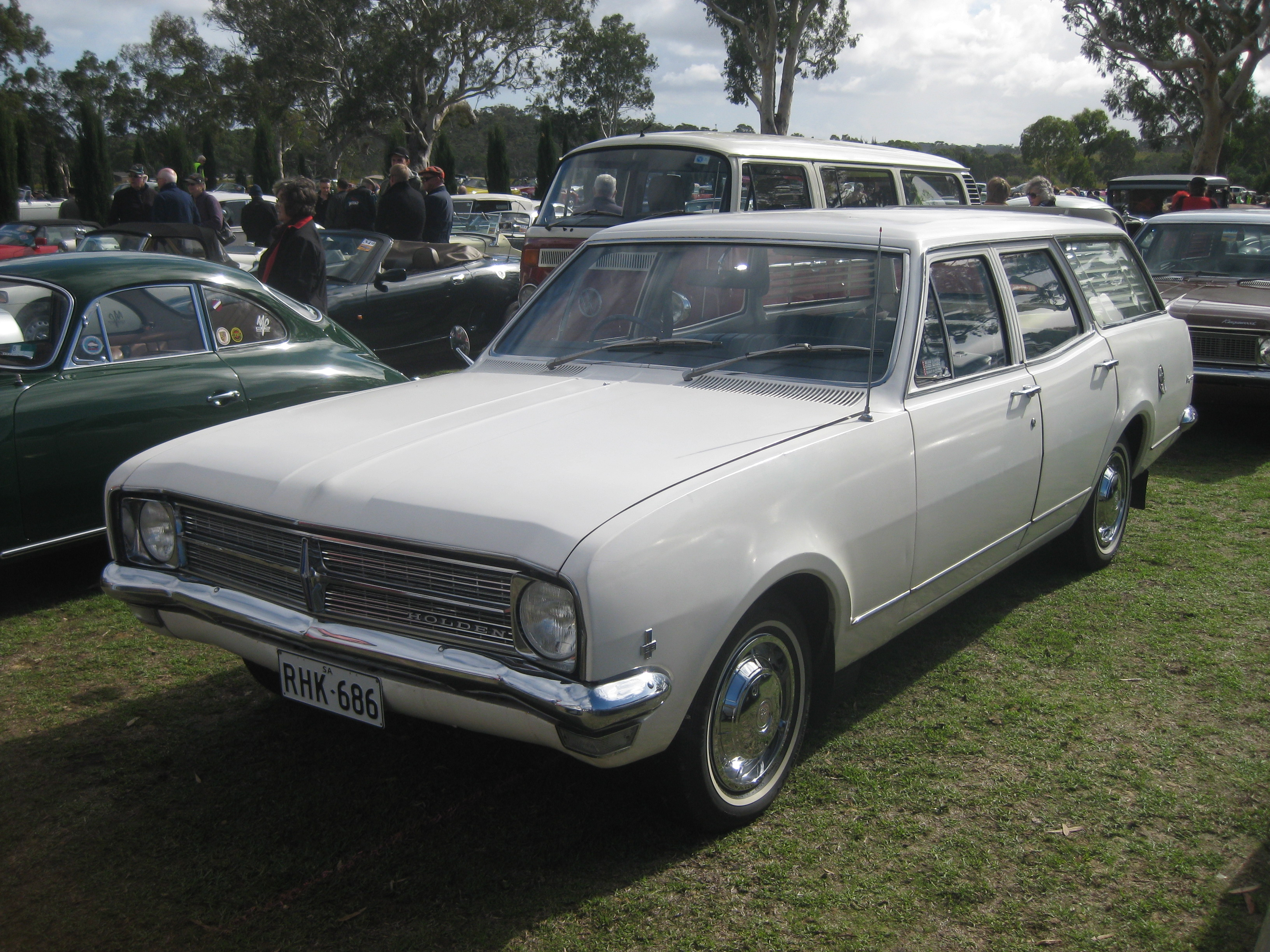
Holden Kingswood station sedan

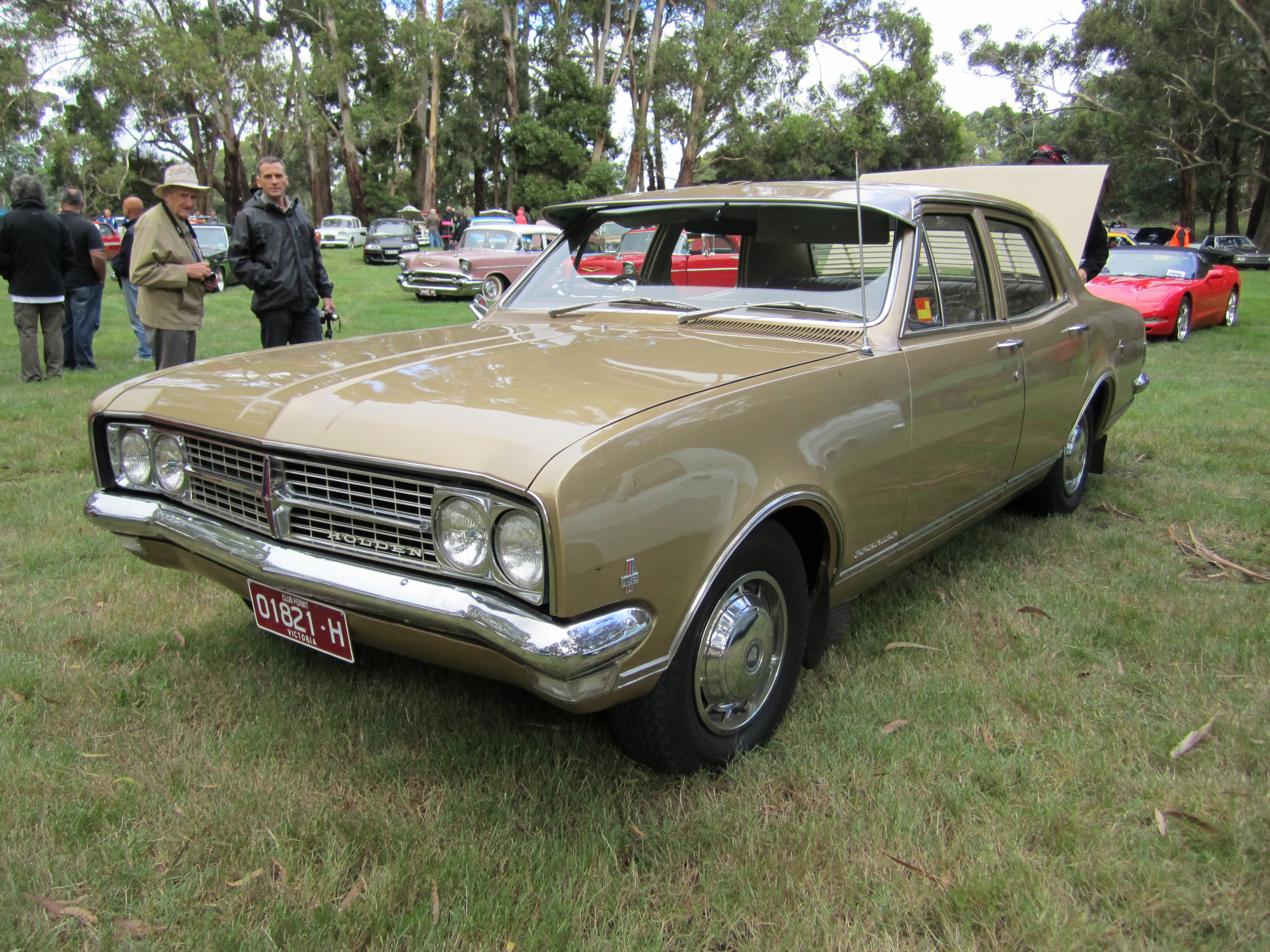
Holden Premier sedan

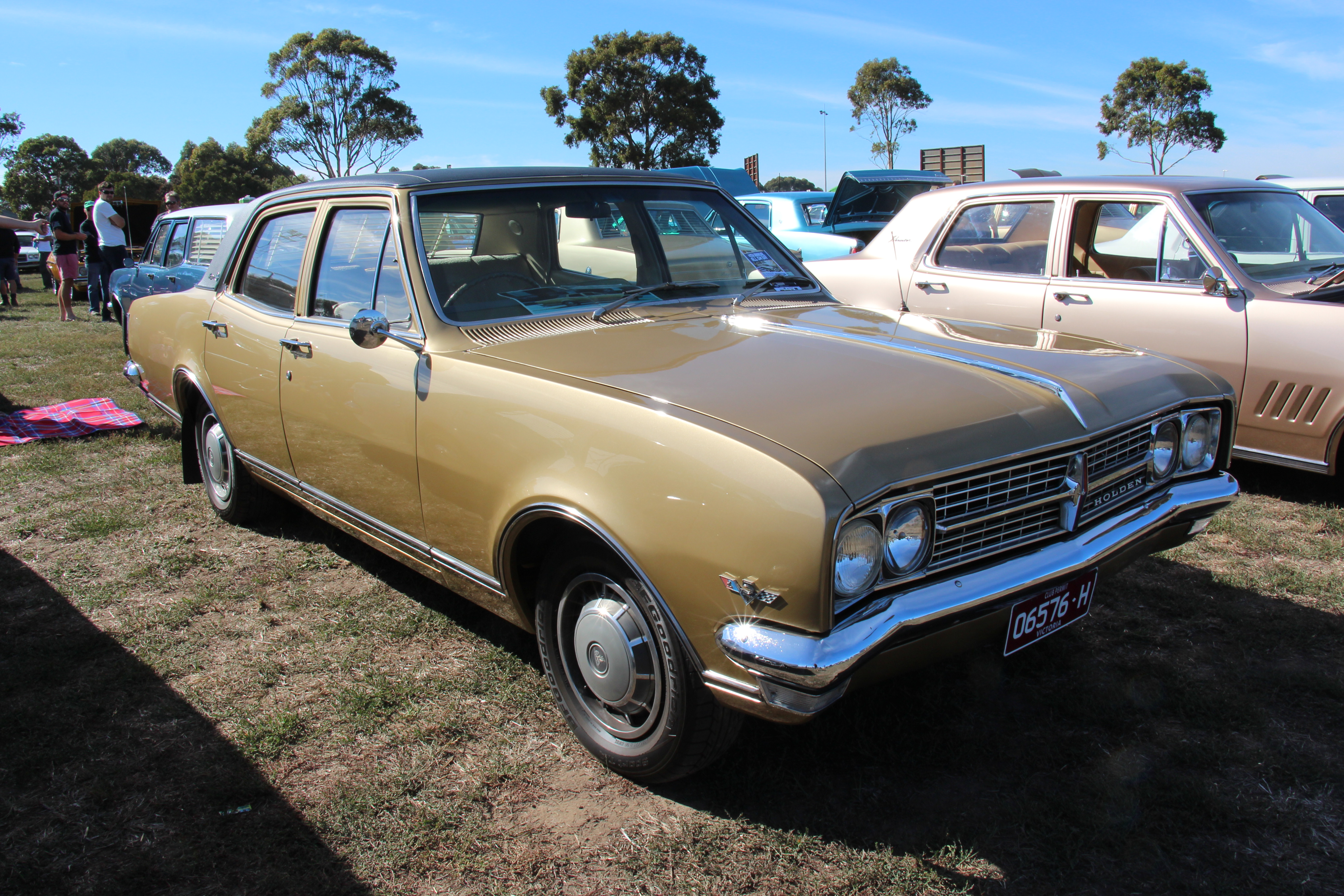
Holden Brougham

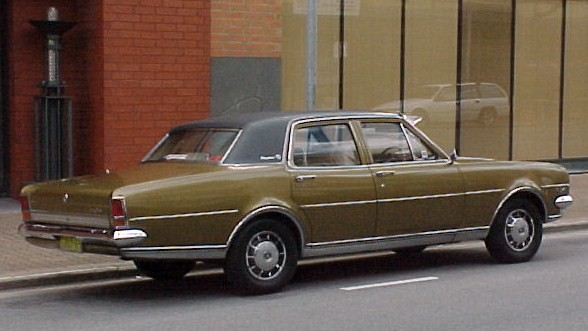
Holden Brougham

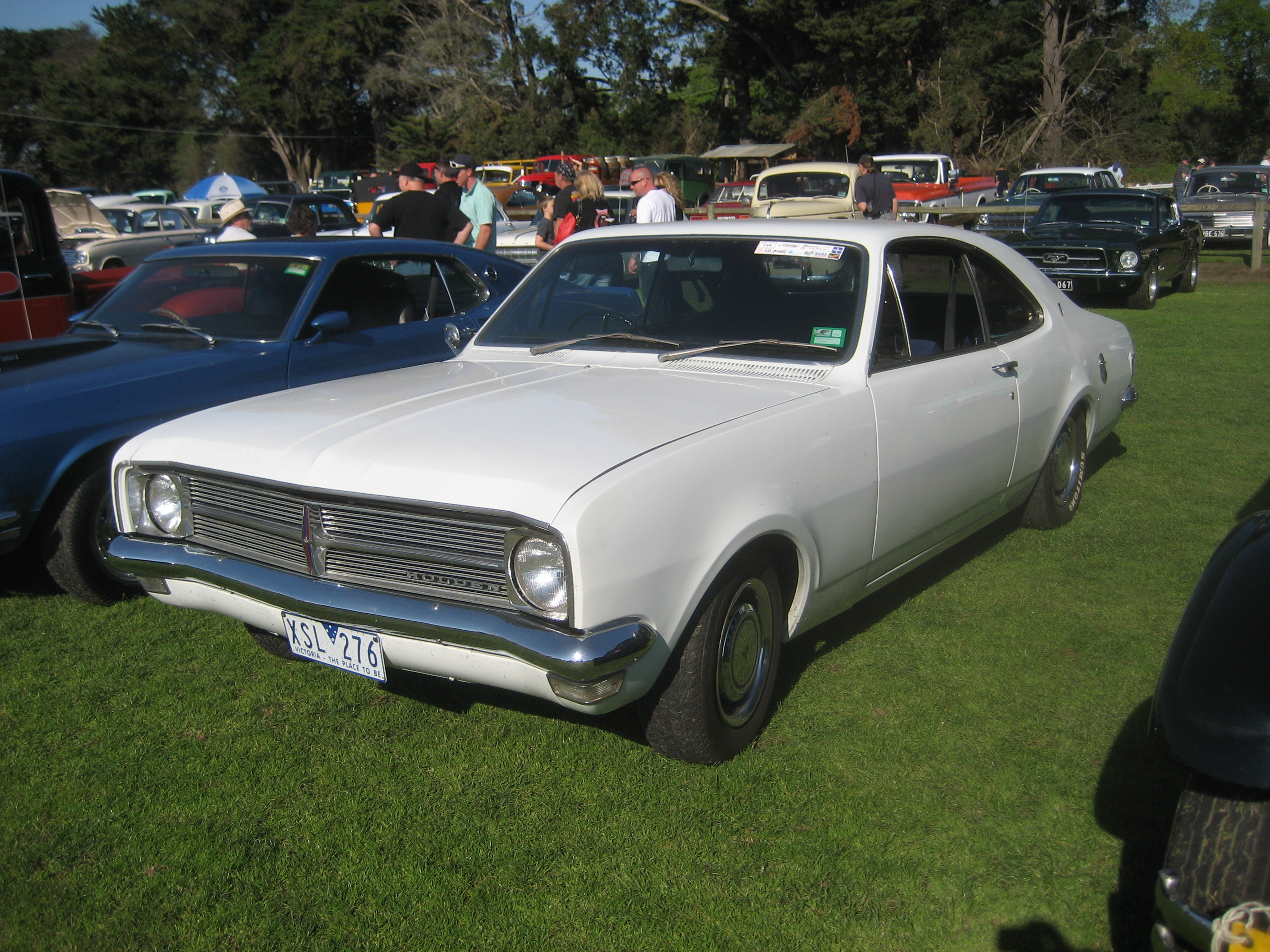
Holden Monaro

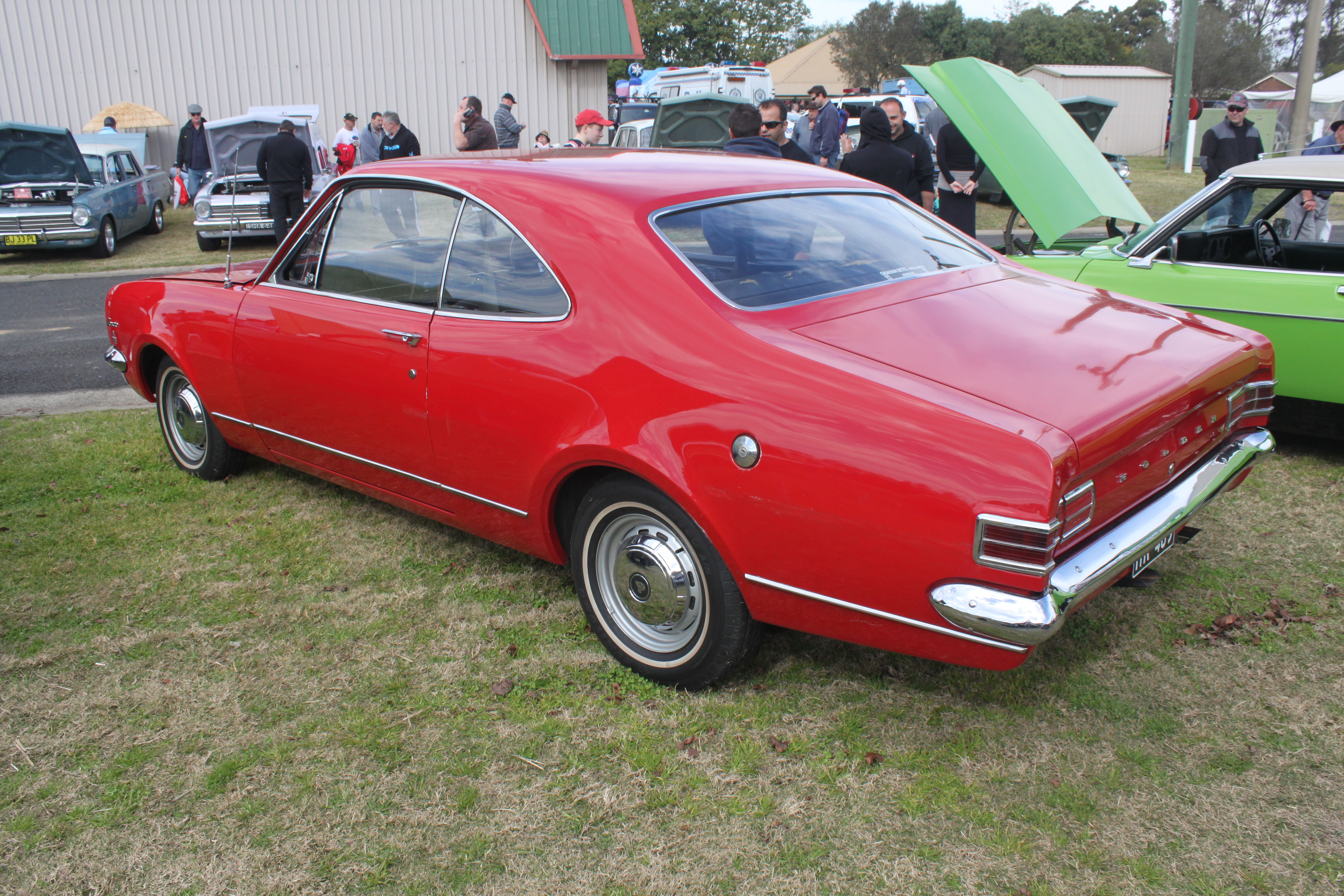
Holden Monaro

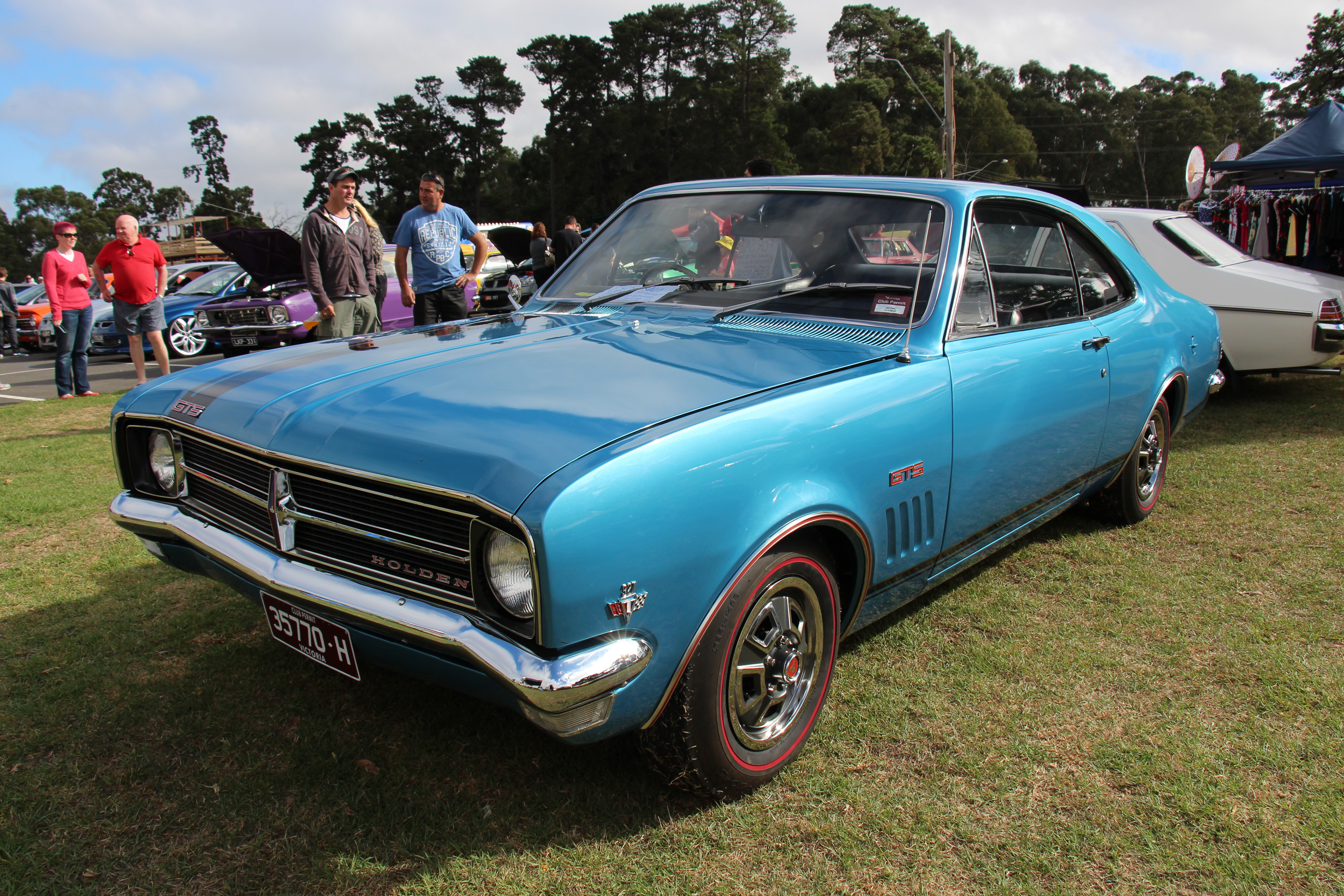
Holden Monaro GTS 327

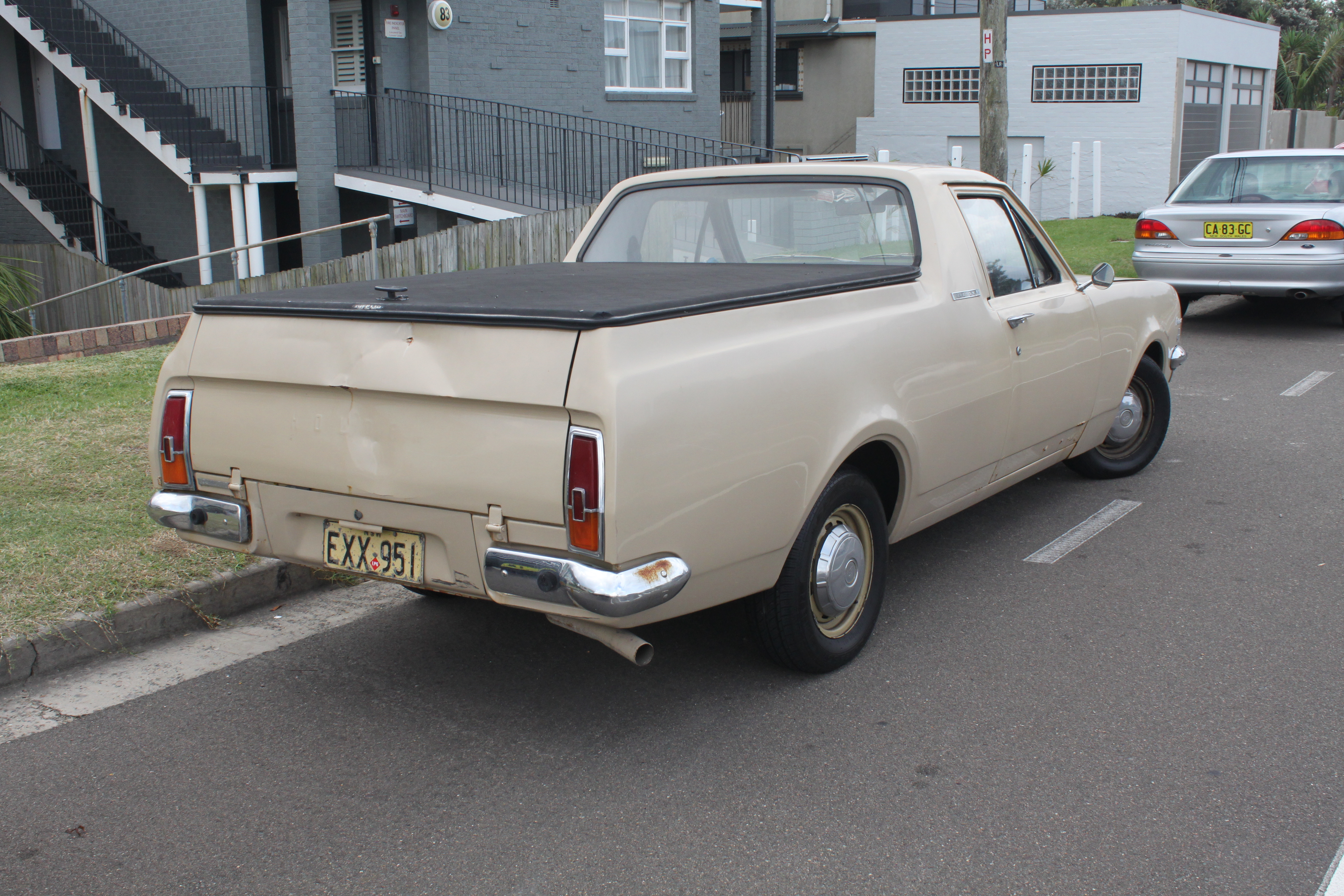
Holden Belmont utility

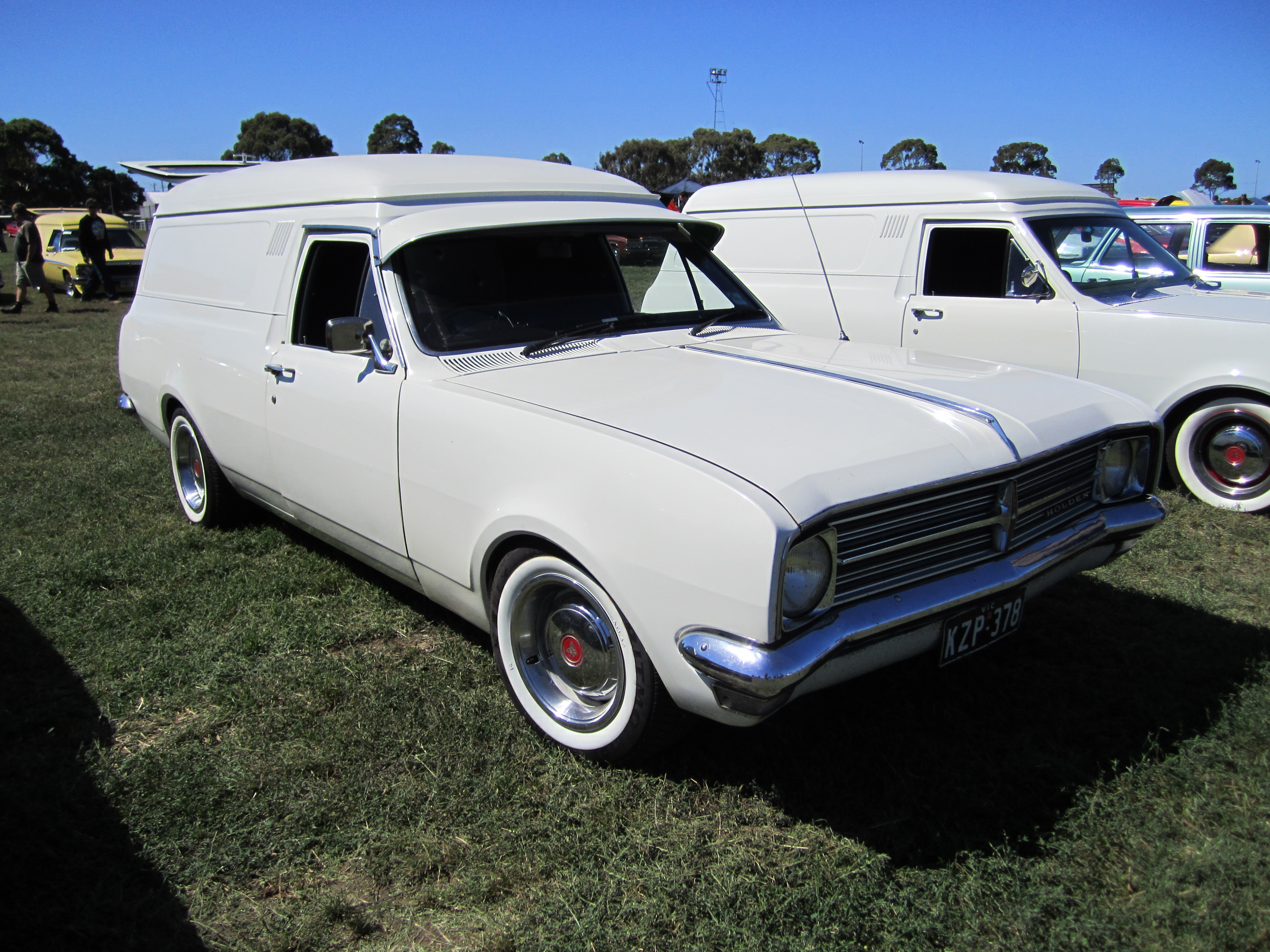
Holden Belmont panel van

== Production and replacement ==
The HK range was replaced by the Holden HT series in May 1969, production having totaled 199,039 units.

== South Africa ==
In South Africa, Holden HK sedan and wagon were marketed as under the name Chevrolet Kommando and the HK utility was sold as the Chevrolet El Camino. They went on sale in May 1969 after two years' development and quickly became General Motors best seller in the country, along with the closely related Constantia. The biggest seller was the LS automatic sedan.
