= Holden straight-six motor =

The Holden straight-six motor is a series of straight-six engines that were produced by General Motors Holden at their Port Melbourne plant between 1948 and 1986. The initial Grey motor was so dubbed because of the colour of the cylinder block, later motors came in the form of a Red, Blue, Black, and the four-cylinder Starfire engine. These engines were fitted to all Australian designed Holdens of the same years, and the four-cylinder Starfire notably also found its way into the Toyota Corona (XT130). The Grey motor is a different engine from the others, while the Red, Blue, Black, and even the Starfire are all inter-related with many common parts and castings.

== Grey ==
Grey engine
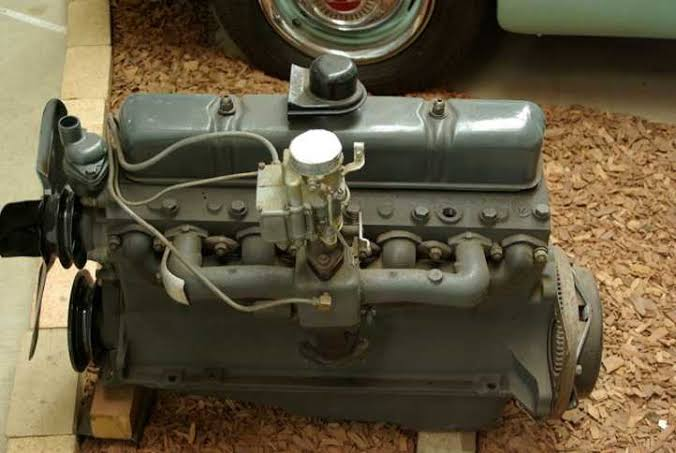

Overview
- Production: 1948-1963

Layout
- Configuration: Straight-six
- Displacement: 132 cubic inches (2,160 cc); 138 cubic inches (2,262 cc)
- Cylinder bore: 3.000 in (76.2 mm); 3.062 in (77.8 mm)
- Piston stroke: 3.125 in (79.4 mm)
- Cylinder block material: Cast iron
- Cylinder head material: Cast iron
- Valvetrain: OHV 2 valves per cyl.
- Valvetrain drive system: Timing gears
- Compression ratio: 6.8:1–7.5:1

Combustion
- Fuel system: Carburettor
- Fuel type: Petrol
- Oil system: Wet sump
- Cooling system: Water-cooled

Output
- Power output: 60–76 hp (45–57 kW)
- Torque output: 100–119 lb⋅ft (136–161 N⋅m)

Chronology
- Successor: Holden Red engine

The Grey motor, built between 1948 and 1963, (the last on 2 August 1963) earned its name as the engine block was painted grey. This overhead valve engine was first fitted to the Holden 48-215 (and variants) and mated to a three-speed column change gearbox. A three-speed GM Roto-Hydramatic 240 automatic transmission was an option fitted in the latter EK and EJ series. The engine was based on the pre-World War II Buick Straight-6 engine design, and saw only minor changes throughout its 15-year life.

It displaced 132 cubic inches (2,160 cc) in its original form as used by the 48-215 (1948). It developed 60 brake horsepower (45 kW). This engine remained in production for eight years - until the release of the FE series in 1956. At that point, power was increased to 72hp (53kW) by an increase in the compression ratio to 6.8:1. Holden replaced the FC in 1960 with the FB series, and its engine was bored out to 138 cubic inches (2,260 cc). The compression ratio was increased to 7.8:1. It developed 76 brake horsepower (57 kW) at 4200 rpm and 120lb.ft (162N.m) at 1400rpm, providing superior performance to the competing four-cylinder Austin, Morris, Vauxhall and Ford of Britain vehicles. The grey motor was a low stress design for high reliability and featured a low compression ratio. Due to sheer ubiquity, they were popular for racing, and were fitted to many open-wheelers, as well as racing Holdens. With the engines' low-end torque, they also found their way into boats and machinery such as forklift trucks.

This engine ran a seven-port non-crossflow cast-iron cylinder head. There were three Siamese (shared) inlet ports for cylinders 1–2, 3–4 and 5–6, two individual exhaust ports for cylinders 1 and 6, and two siamese exhaust ports for cylinders 2–3 and 4–5 in a layout on one side of the head casting. The inlets were fed by a single-barrel Stromberg carburettor in common and fitted with a traditional Kettering ignition by coil and distributor. The electric system was six volts in the 48-215 and FJ. The earliest grey motors (approximately 100,000) were fitted with Delco-Remy accessories, although Lucas and Bosch equivalents throughout the motor's lifetime replaced these.

The very first production grey motor (1948) was number 1001, and they continued in a single sequence until July 1956, when the prefix "L" was introduced. The change affected all engines numbered L283373 and above, signifying the 12-volt negative-earth engines as fitted to the all new FE model. The prefix "U" was introduced for motors with the original electricals as fitted to the FJ utility and panel van models, which ended in February and May 1957 respectively. The change was effective from engine U283384. The prefix "B" was introduced and the number sequence reset with the introduction of the 138 cubic inches (2.3 L) displacement engine, and ultimately this was replaced by a "J" prefix for motors fitted to EJ vehicles in 1962.

=== Applications ===
- 1948–1953 Holden FX
  - 1948–1953 Holden 48-215 (sedan)
  - 1951–1953 50-2106 (coupé utility)
  - 1953 48-215-257 (business/taxi sedan, sometimes abbreviated to 48-217)
- 1953–1956 Holden FJ
- 1956–1958 Holden FE
- 1958–1960 Holden FC
- 1960–1961 Holden FB
- 1961–1962 Holden EK
- 1962–1963 Holden EJ

== Red ==
Red engine
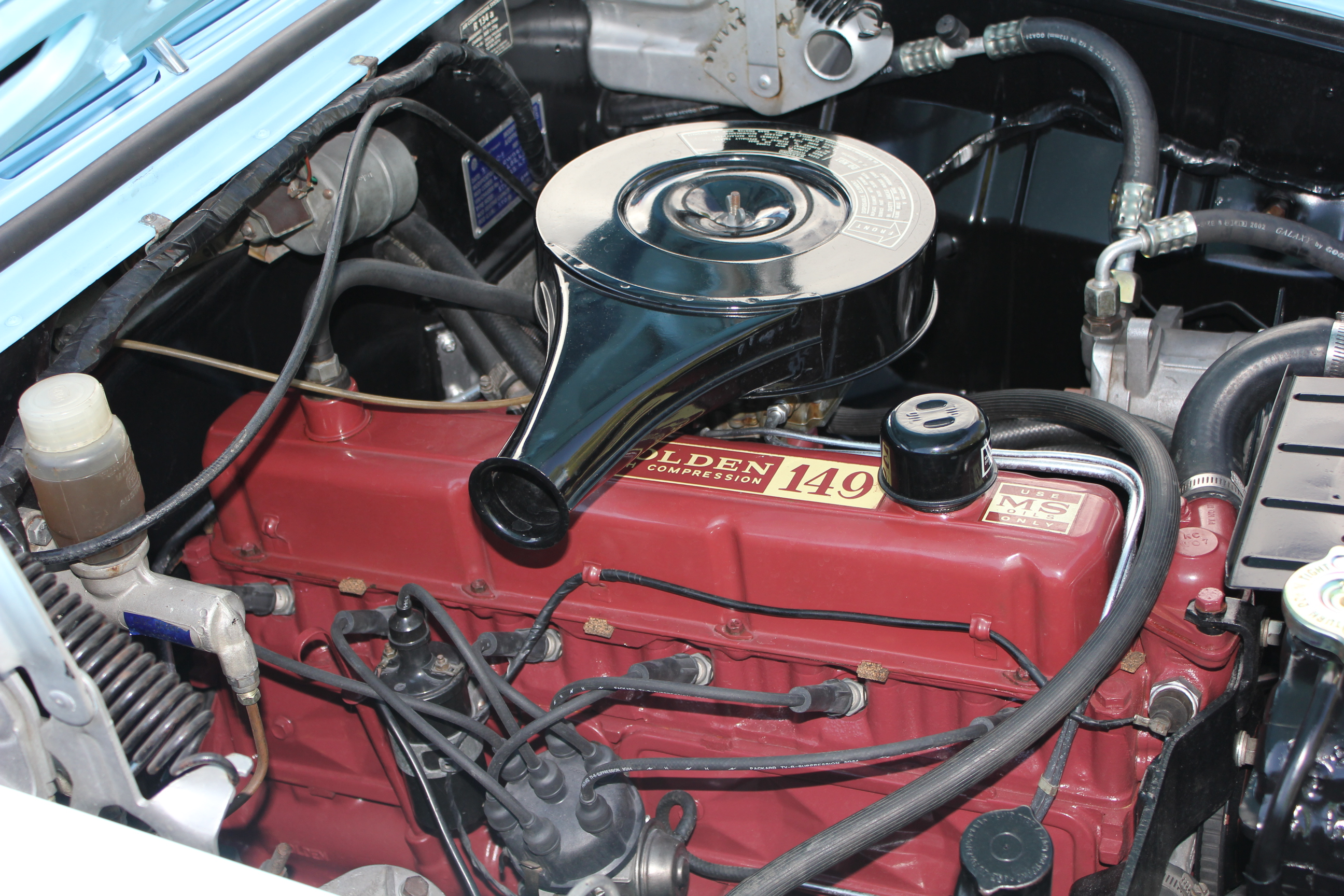

Overview
- Production: 1963–1980

Layout
- Configuration: Straight-six
- Displacement: 130 cubic inches (2,130 cc); 138 cubic inches (2,262 cc); 149 cubic inches (2,447 cc); 161 cubic inches (2,639 cc); 173 cubic inches (2,835 cc); 179 cubic inches (2,940 cc); 186 cubic inches (3,049 cc); 202 cubic inches (3,298cc)
- Cylinder bore: 3.031 in (77.0 mm); 3.125 in (79.4 mm); 3.250 in (82.6 mm); 3.375 in (85.7 mm); 3.500 in (88.9 mm); 3.563 in (90.5 mm); 3.625 in (92.1 mm)
- Piston stroke: 3.000 in (76.2 mm); 3.250 in (82.6 mm)
- Cylinder block material: Cast iron
- Cylinder head material: Cast iron
- Valvetrain: OHV 2 valves per cyl.
- Valvetrain drive system: Timing gears
- Compression ratio: 8.8:1-9.4:1

Combustion
- Fuel system: Carburettor
- Fuel type: Petrol
- Oil system: Wet sump
- Cooling system: Water-cooled

Output
- Power output: 77–147 PS (76–145 hp; 57–108 kW)
- Torque output: 183–263 N⋅m (19–27 kg⋅m; 135–194 lb⋅ft)

Chronology
- Predecessor: Holden Grey engine
- Successor: Holden Blue engine

Holden Red motor (1971–1974 HQ series)
Engine	Displacement	Compression	Power		Torque	
Engine	Displacement	Compression	bhp	kW	ft·lb	N·m
173 cu in Red I6	2.8 litres (2,835 cc)	Low	112	84	160	220
173 cu in Red I6	2.8 litres (2,835 cc)	High	118	88	168	228
202 cu in Red I6	3.3 litres (3,298 cc)	Low	129	96	190	260
202 cu in Red I6	3.3 litres (3,298 cc)	High	135	101	194	263

Superseding the Grey motor, the Red motor was manufactured between 1963 and 1980. This was a completely new engine and in no way a further development of the grey motor. It featured a seven-bearing crankshaft, full flow oil filter and hydraulic valve lifters. Denoted by the entire engine being painted red including the inlet manifold, the engine made its debut in the Holden EH in capacities of 149 cubic inches (2,447 cc) and 179 cubic inches (2,930 cc) (or HP) producing 100 and 115 brake horsepower (75 and 86 kW) respectively. This was a power increase of 33 per cent and 53 per cent over the grey motor.

Initially the engine capacity was not cast on the blocks. The EH model with the 149 CID block was blank and the 179 CID was designated with the letters “HP” (to denote the high-performance engine). The 179 capacity marking cast in raised numbers, located on the side of the block behind the generator/alternator, began in December 1964 in readiness for the January 1965 start of production for the HD model due for release in February 1965. This 179 block casting also included the last of the EH commercial models that were ending production in June 1965.

All red engines manufactured prior to January 1968 had forged steel crankshafts.(with the exception of some HR model field test vehicles). With the opening of Holden’s Nodular Iron Foundry (the only one in Australia) on 10 February 1967 by Prime Minister, Harold Holt production of cast nodular iron crankshafts, along with other products, could begin.

The Nodular Iron crankshafts were first released for field testing in some engines fitted in the HR model. Starting from engine number A121465, in February 1967, they were identified by using a different harmonic balancer with a vee annular groove. Full production release of the so called “cast” crankshaft in the red motor was from January 1968 in the HK model. The forged steel crankshafts, however, still remained in the optional engine variants such as the X2, all 186S engines and the LC 186 XU1. The standard engine colour also changed in the HK to Rocket Red from the previous “Holden Engine Red”. In 1978 Holden changed the colour of the Red motor to a new variation called Rocket Red MkII (Dulux code 31036).

Capacities

- 130 – South Africa, et al. HQ export
- 138 – LC & LJ Torana
- 149
- 161
- 173
- 179
- 186
- 202

=== Applications ===
==== Holden Standard, Special, Premier (1963–1968) ====
- 1963–1965 Holden EH
- 1965–1966 Holden HD
- 1966–1968 Holden HR

==== Holden Belmont, Kingswood, Premier (1968–1980) ====
- 1968–1969 Holden HK
- 1969–1970 Holden HT
- 1970–1971 Holden HG
- 1971–1974 Holden HQ
- 1974–1976 Holden HJ
- 1976–1977 Holden HX
- 1977–1980 Holden HZ

==== Holden Commodore (1978–1980) ====
- 1978–1980 Holden Commodore VB

==== Holden Torana (1969–1979) ====
- 1969–1971 Holden Torana LC
- 1972–1974 Holden Torana LJ
- 1974–1975 Holden Torana LH
- 1976–1978 Holden Torana LX
- 1978–1979 Holden Torana UC

==== Bedford (1971–1979) ====
- 1971–1979 Bedford CF (Australasian models only)

== Blue ==
Blue engine
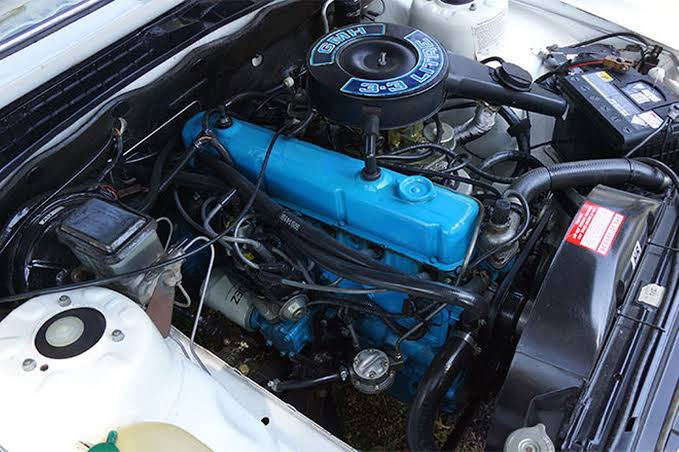

Overview
- Production: 1980-1984

Layout
- Configuration: Straight-six
- Displacement: 173 cubic inches (2,835 cc); 202 cubic inches (3,298cc)
- Cylinder bore: 3.500 in (88.9 mm); 3.625 in (92.1 mm)
- Piston stroke: 3.000 in (76.2 mm); 3.250 in (82.6 mm)
- Cylinder block material: Cast iron
- Cylinder head material: Cast iron
- Valvetrain: OHV 2 valves per cyl.
- Valvetrain drive system: Timing gears
- Compression ratio: 8.8:1-9.0:1

Combustion
- Fuel system: Carburettor
- Fuel type: Petrol
- Oil system: Wet sump
- Cooling system: Water-cooled

Output
- Power output: 103–114 PS (102–112 hp; 76–84 kW)
- Torque output: 192–231 N⋅m (20–24 kg⋅m; 142–170 lb⋅ft)

Chronology
- Predecessor: Holden Red engine
- Successor: Holden Black engine

The Blue specification debuted in the 1980 VC Commodore.

The blue motor was a development of the earlier red engine, and incorporated several improvements; the biggest of these changes was the complete redesign of the cylinder head. The head was upgraded to a 12 port design with individual ports for each cylinder, and a revised T5 camshaft.The blue motor was made in 2.85-and 3.3- litre versions. The crankshaft for the 3.3-litre engine now had counterweights on each throw, and stronger connecting rods were used. The crankshaft for the 2.85-litre remained the same as earlier crankshafts except that it had the main journal size increased to the same size as the blue 3.3 litre. A two-barrel Varajet carburettor was standard, as was a dual outlet exhaust manifold and a Bosch HEI distributor.

=== Applications ===
- 1980–1985 Holden WB
- 1980–1981 Holden Commodore VC
- 1981–1984 Holden Commodore VH

== Black ==
Black engine
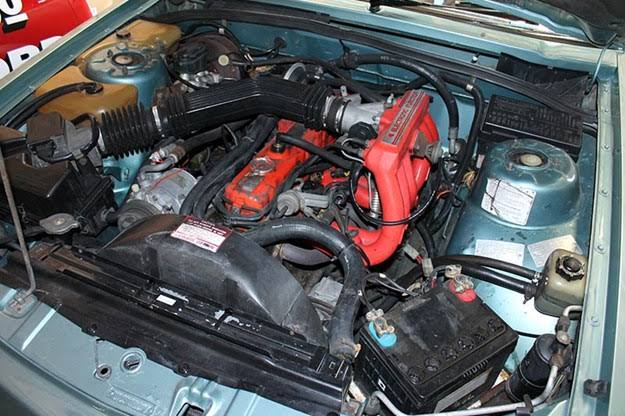

Overview
- Production: 1984-1986

Layout
- Configuration: Straight-six
- Displacement: 202 cubic inches (3,298cc)
- Cylinder bore: 3.625 in (92.1 mm)
- Piston stroke: 3.250 in (82.6 mm)
- Cylinder block material: Cast iron
- Cylinder head material: Cast iron
- Valvetrain: OHV 2 valves per cyl.
- Valvetrain drive system: Timing gears
- Compression ratio: 8.8:1

Combustion
- Fuel system: Carburettor; Multi-port fuel injection
- Management: Jetronic for EFI variant
- Fuel type: Petrol
- Oil system: Wet sump
- Cooling system: Water-cooled

Output
- Power output: 117–144 PS (115–142 hp; 86–106 kW)
- Torque output: 232–266 N⋅m (24–27 kg⋅m; 171–196 lb⋅ft)

Chronology
- Predecessor: Holden Blue engine
- Successor: Nissan RB engine (RB30E)

The Black specification was introduced in the 1984 VK Commodore. The black engine was only produced in 3.3-litre displacement, and in carbureted and fuel-injected versions. The carbureted engine was almost identical to the previous blue engine, the main difference being in the use of computer controlled spark timing (EST) taking its timing pick-up from the flywheel area. The ports were slightly wider spaced, meaning the manifolds will not simply interchange. The fuel-injected version used Bosch LE2-Jetronic multipoint fuel injection and featured a long-runner intake manifold, 6-3-1 tubular exhaust manifold and a conventional HEI ignition. It also had slightly different cylinder head intake ports for improved breathing (along with location notches for the fuel injectors) and revised camshaft specifications, and delivered superior performance and fuel economy over the carbureted version. In the 1986 VL Commodore, Holden replaced the Australian-made and designed six-cylinder engines with the Nissan RB30E and RB20E engines. Pending emission standards and the requirement for unleaded fuel made it difficult to re-engineer the Australian engine.

=== Applications ===
- 1984–1986 Holden Commodore VK

== Starfire ==
Starfire engine
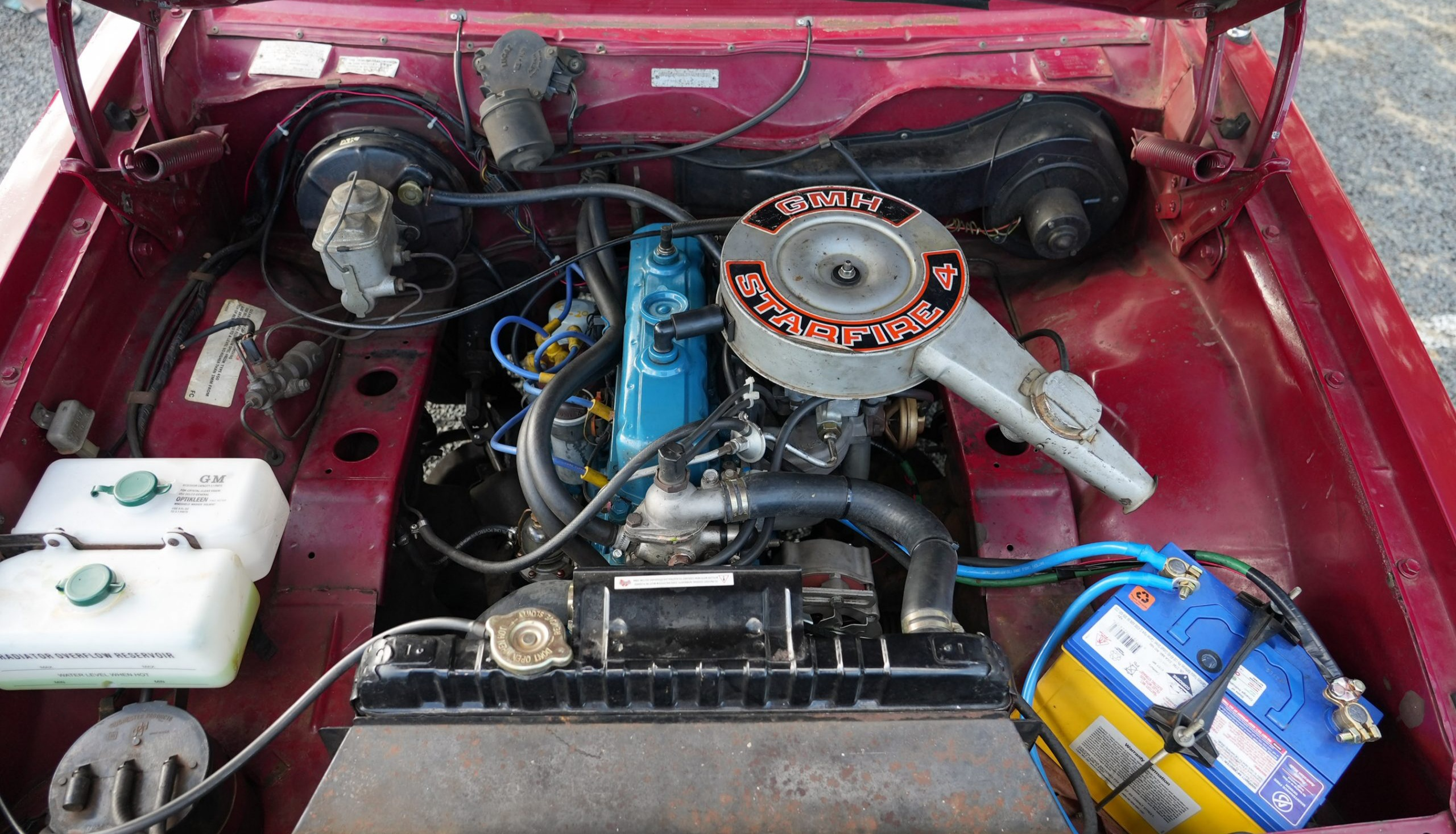

Overview
- Also called: Misfire, Backfire (colloquial); Toyota X engine
- Production: 1978-1986

Layout
- Configuration: Straight-four
- Displacement: 115 cubic inches (1,892 cc)
- Cylinder bore: 3.500 in (88.9 mm)
- Piston stroke: 3.000 in (76.2 mm)
- Cylinder block material: Cast iron
- Cylinder head material: Cast iron
- Valvetrain: OHV 2 valves per cyl.
- Valvetrain drive system: Timing gears
- Compression ratio: 8.7:1

Combustion
- Fuel system: Carburettor
- Fuel type: Petrol
- Oil system: Wet sump
- Cooling system: Water-cooled

Output
- Power output: 58 kW (78 hp)
- Torque output: 136 N⋅m (100 lb⋅ft)

Chronology
- Predecessor: Opel cam-in-head engine 1.9L
- Successor: GM Family II engine 1.6L-2.0L

This 1.9-litre (1,892 cc) powerplant, known as the Starfire Four motor, was effectively Holden's existing 2.85-litre 173 cu in straight-six with two cylinders removed. Designed and built in Australia to satisfy local content rules, it first appeared in 1978 during the UC Sunbird's production run, replacing the Opel 1.9-litre cam-in-head unit used in LH, LX and early UC Torana/Sunbird four-cylinder models.

Peak power output for the Starfire was 58 kW (78 hp), with a 17.5 second acceleration time from 0–100 km/h (62 mph) in the VC Commodore. This variant's performance meant the need to push the engine hard leading to fuel consumption similar to the straight-sixes. Due to this, it was often nicknamed as Misfire or Backfire. This engine was replaced in the Australian market by the Camira's OHC Camtech unit, however, it continued to be used until 1986 in New Zealand, where it was used to power four-cylinder versions of the VK Commodore.

This engine was also used by Toyota Australia to meet local parts content regulations for the Corona XT130. Engines installed in Toyotas received some slight differences in the form of a unique camshaft, manifold, and carburettor. Toyota called the engine the "1X" and it had a slightly different power curve: 58 kW (78 hp) at 4800 rpm and 136 N⋅m (100 lb⋅ft) at 2400 rpm.

=== Applications ===
- 1978–1980 Holden Sunbird (UC) (red block version).
- 1980–1981 Holden Commodore VC
- 1981–1984 Holden Commodore VH
- 1984–1986 Holden Commodore VK (New Zealand)
- 1979–1982 Toyota Corona (XT130)

== ADR27A Compliance ==
ADR27A was an Australian Design Rule specifying regulations for fuel evaporative and exhaust emissions for Australian passenger motor vehicles effective from 1 July 1976 in order to reduce air pollution. The following engines were ADR27A compliant:

- Red (post 1 July 1976 only)
- Blue
- Black
- Starfire

These engines were fitted with emission control systems which generally resulted in reduced engine output. The following table compares the output of the 202ci Red engine in pre- and ADR27A-compliant versions:

	Power	Torque
pre-ADR27A	135 hp (101 kW) @4400rpm	194 lb⋅ft (263 N⋅m) @2000rpm
ADR27A-compliant	109 hp (81 kW) @3900rpm	185 lb⋅ft (251 N⋅m) @1400rpm

== See also ==
- Holden V8 engine
- Nissan RB engine (Straight six used in the Holden Commodore VL)
- List of GM engines
