= Holden EK =

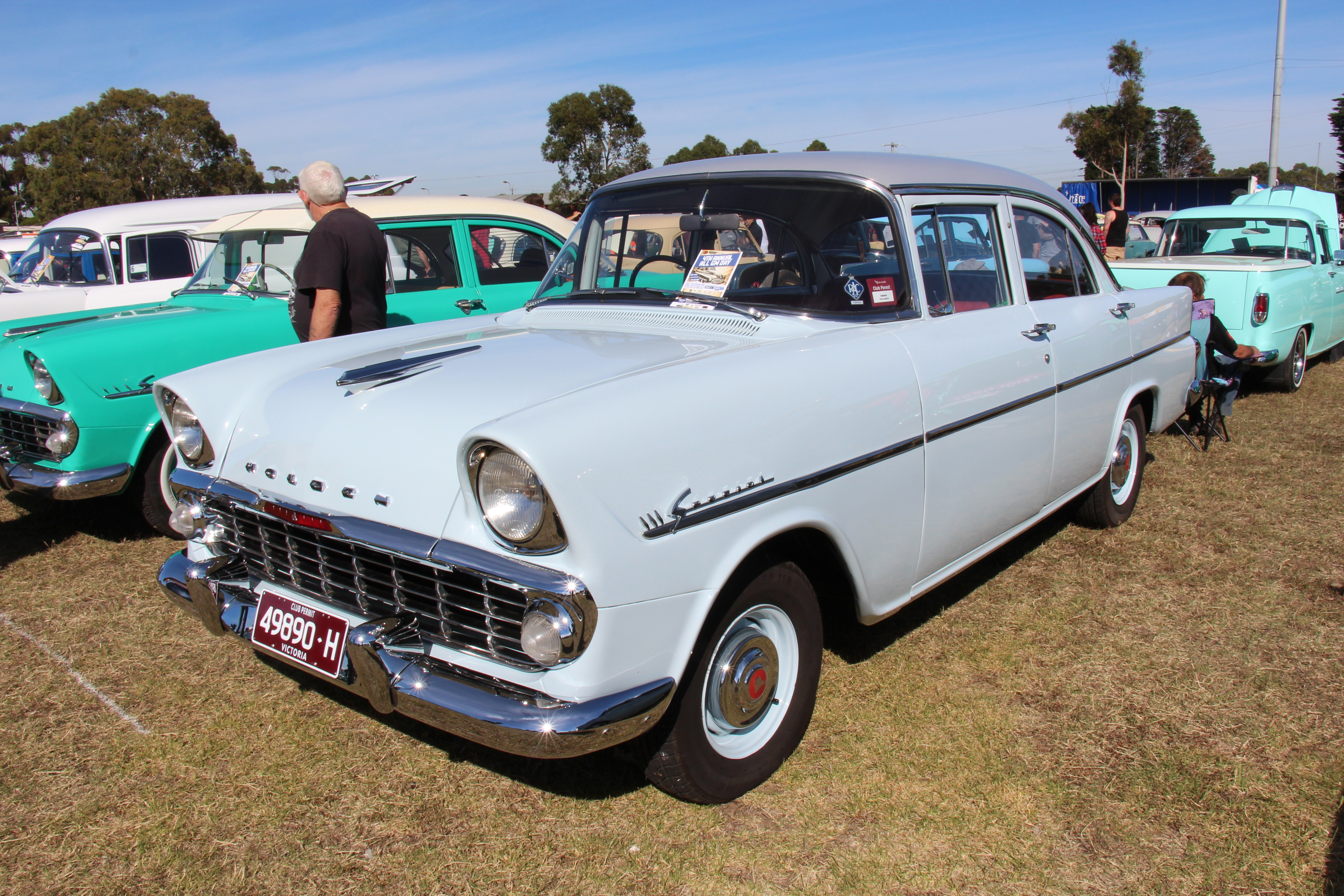
- Holden Special Sedan

Overview
- Manufacturer: Holden (General Motors)
- Also called: Holden Standard; Holden Special; Holden Utility; Holden Panel Van
- Production: May 1961 – July 1962
- Designer: Alf Payze

Body and chassis
- Class: Mid-size
- Body style: 4-door sedan 5-door station wagon 2-door coupé utility 2-door panel van
- Layout: FR layout

Powertrain
- Engine: 2.3L GMH '138' I6
- Transmission: 3-speed manual 3-speed automatic

Dimensions
- Wheelbase: 105.0 inches (2667 mm)
- Length: 181.8 inches (4617 mm)
- Width: 67.0 inches (1703 mm)
- Height: 59.9 inches (1521 mm)
- Kerb weight: Standard Sedan: 2471 lb (1121 kg)

Chronology
- Predecessor: Holden FB
- Successor: Holden EJ

The Holden EK series is a motor vehicle produced by Holden in Australia from 1961 to 1962. Introduced on 2 May 1961, the EK series was a facelifted version of the Holden FB, which it replaced.

== Model range ==
The EK range consisted of four-door sedans in two trim levels, five-door station wagons in two trim levels, a two-door coupe utility and a two-door panel van. The six models were marketed as follows:

- Holden Standard Sedan
- Holden Standard Station Sedan
- Holden Special Sedan
- Holden Special Station Sedan
- Holden Utility
- Holden Panel Van
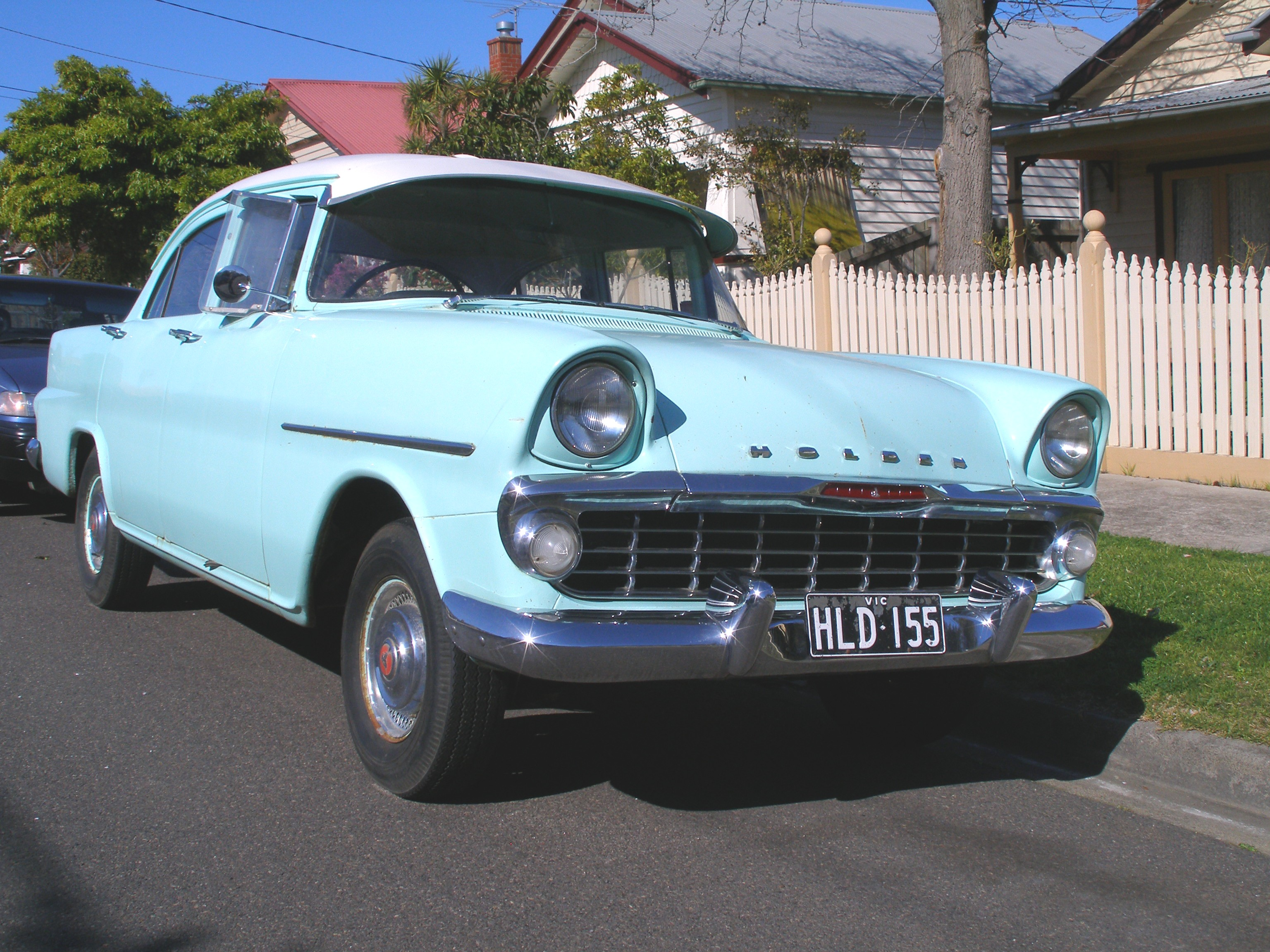
Holden Standard Sedan

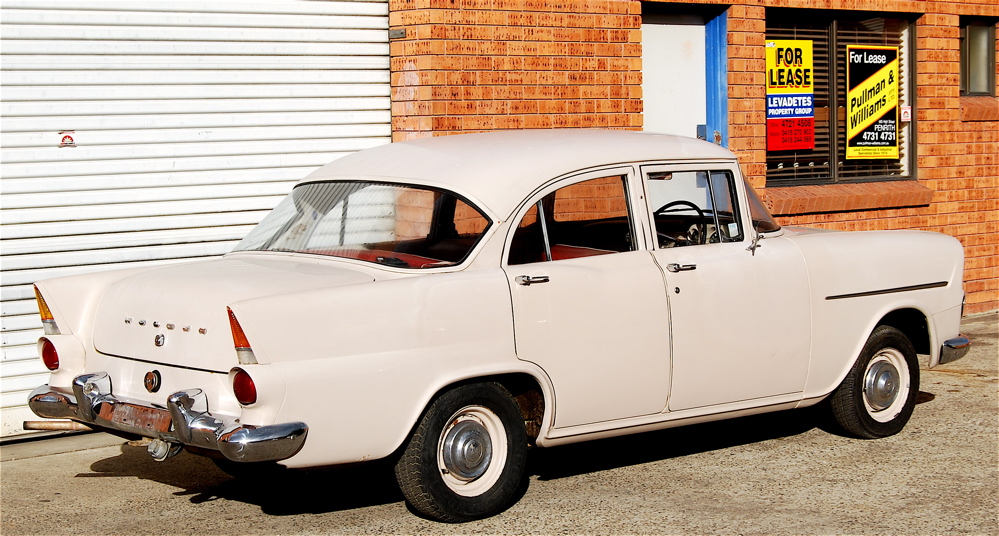
Holden Standard Sedan

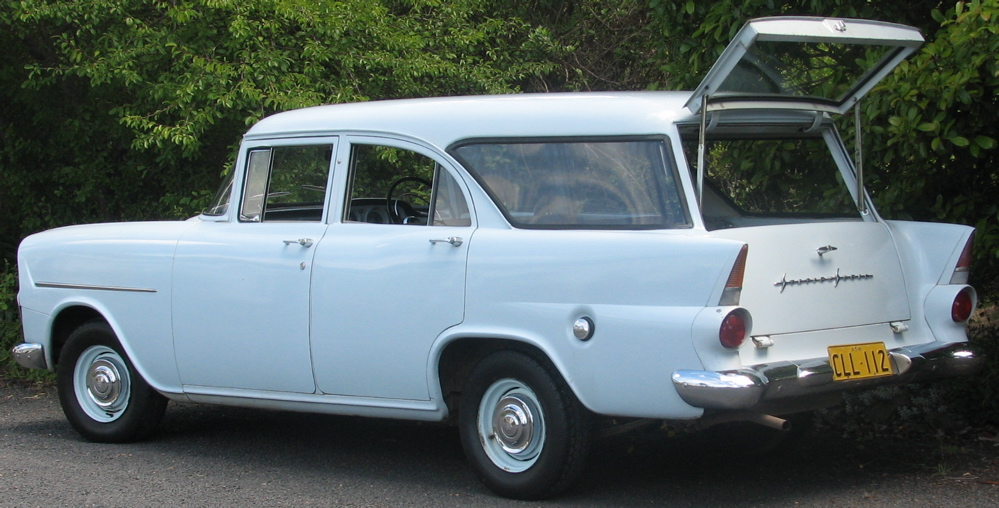
Holden Standard Station Sedan

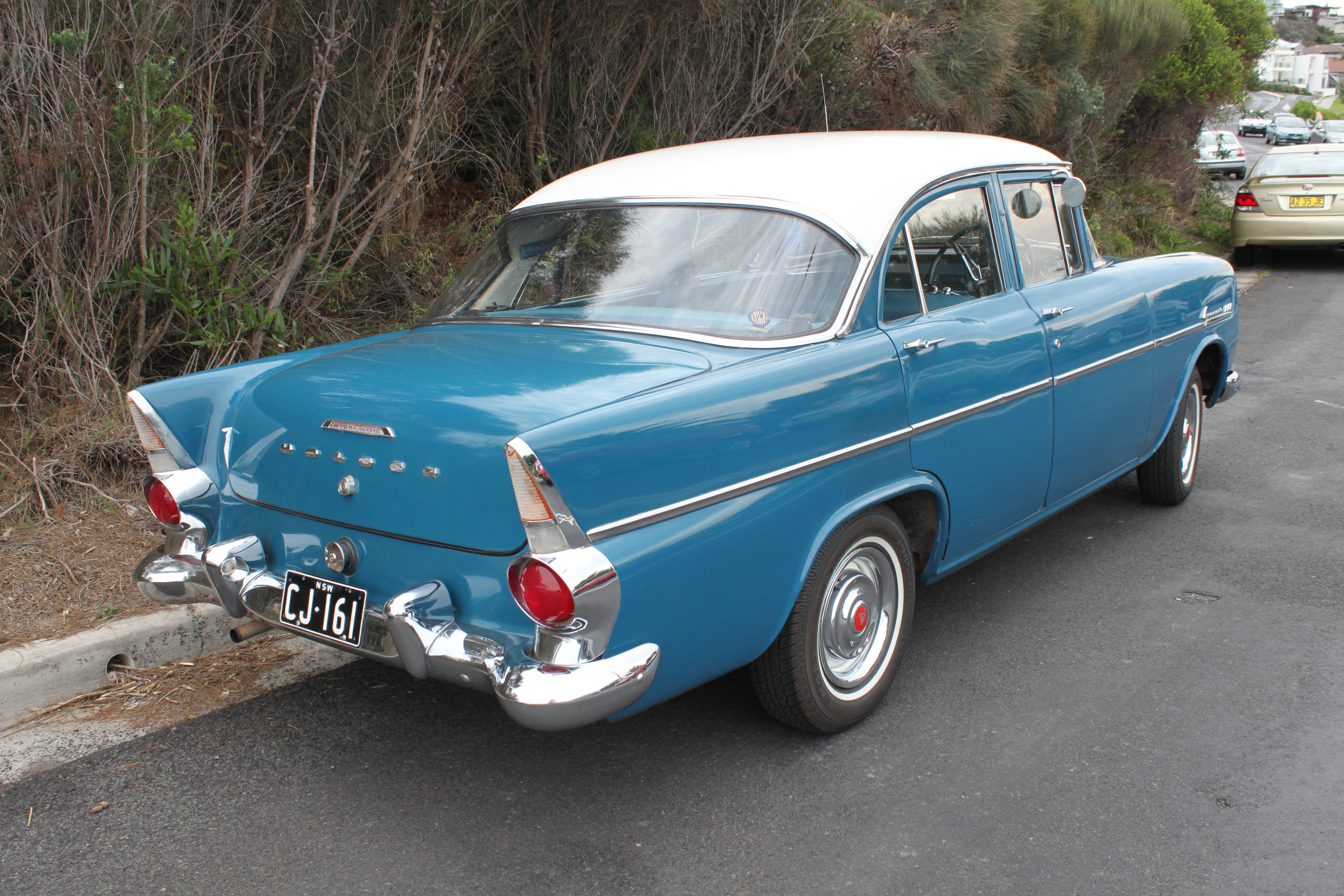
Holden Special Sedan

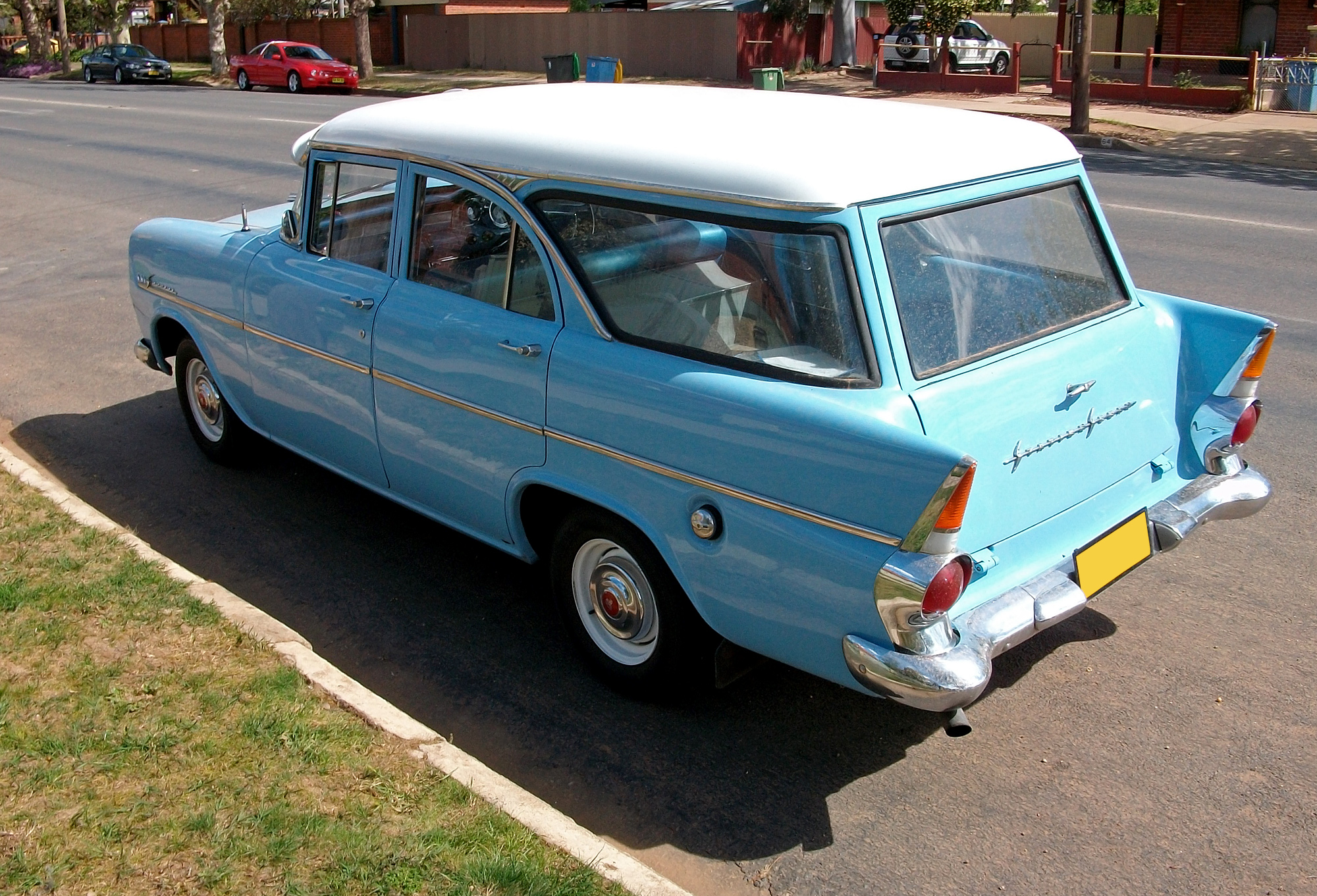
Holden Special Station Sedan

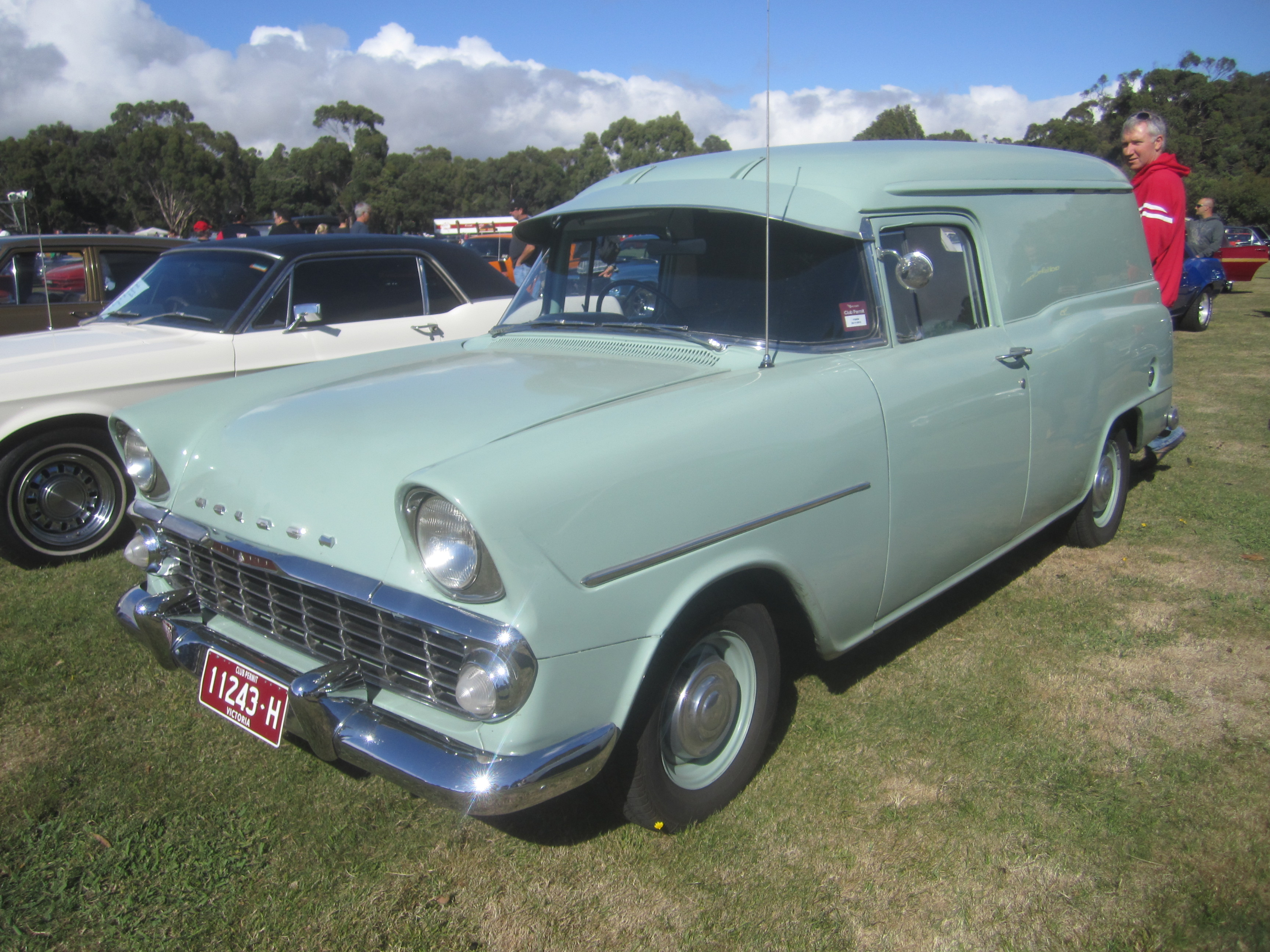
Holden Panel Van

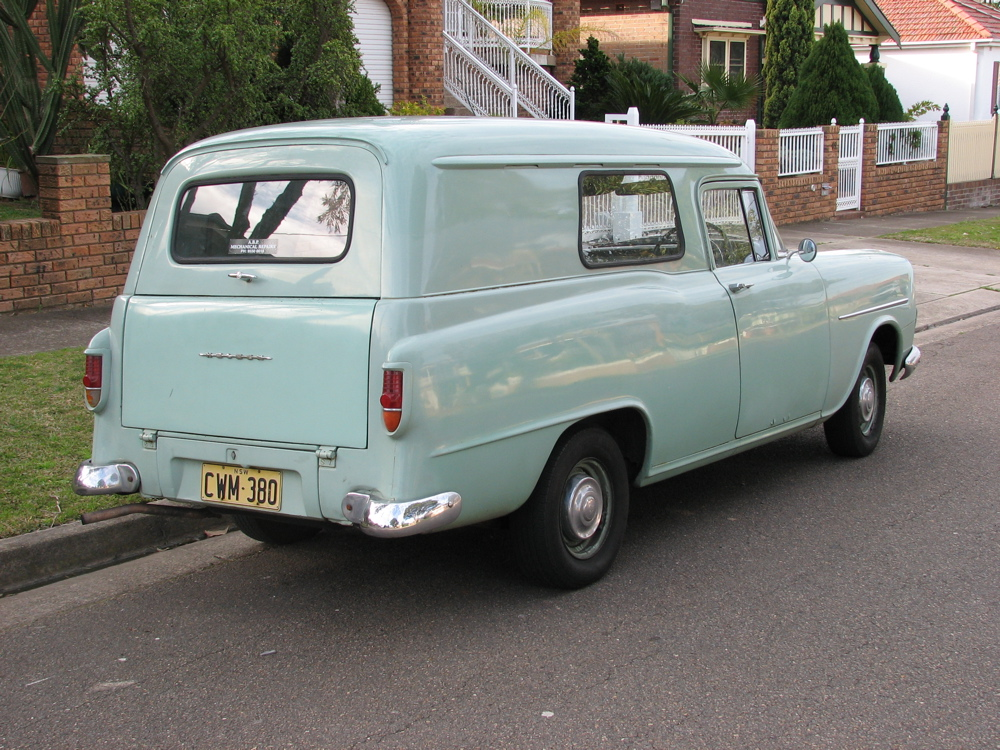
Holden Panel Van

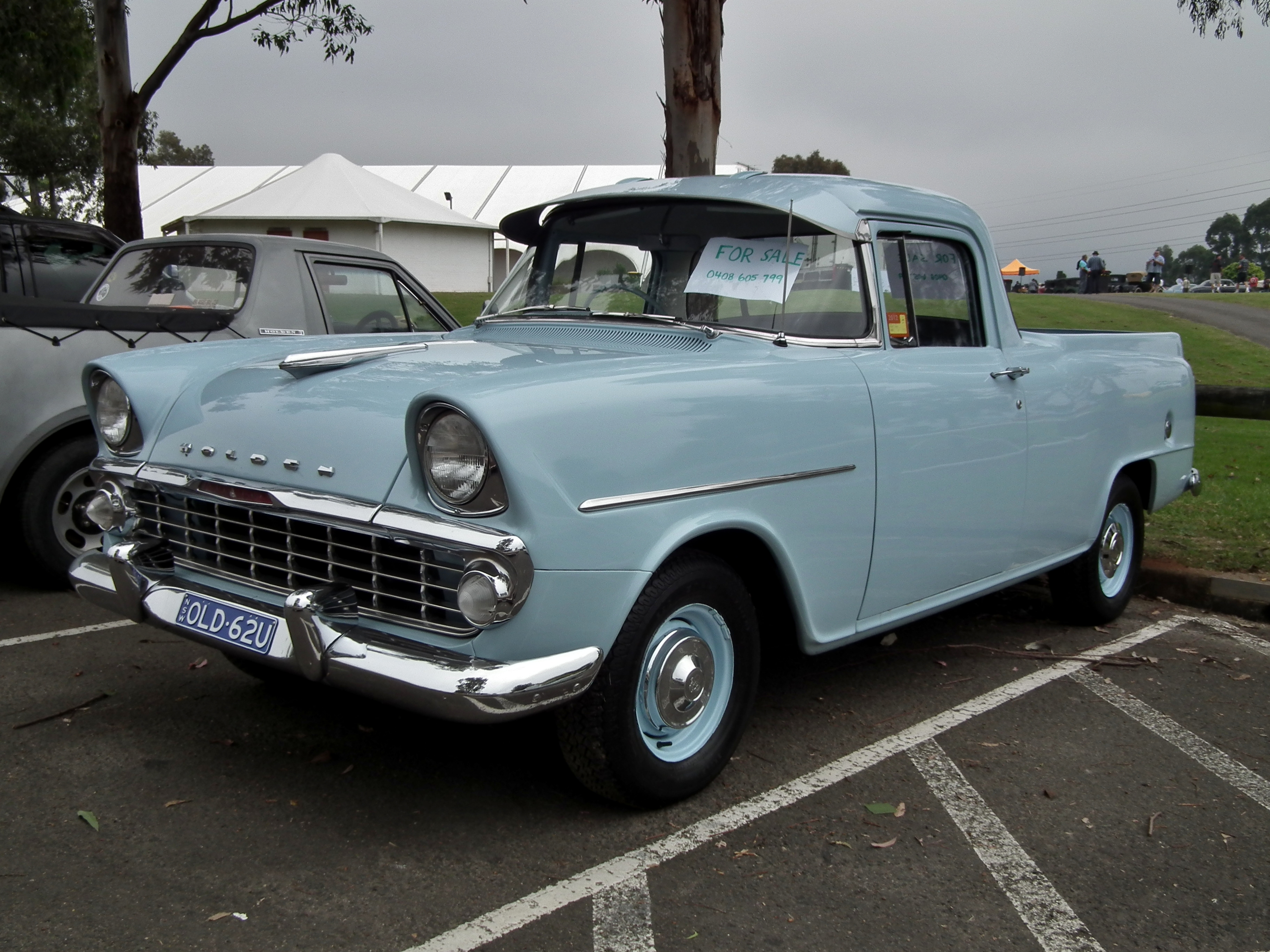
Holden Utility

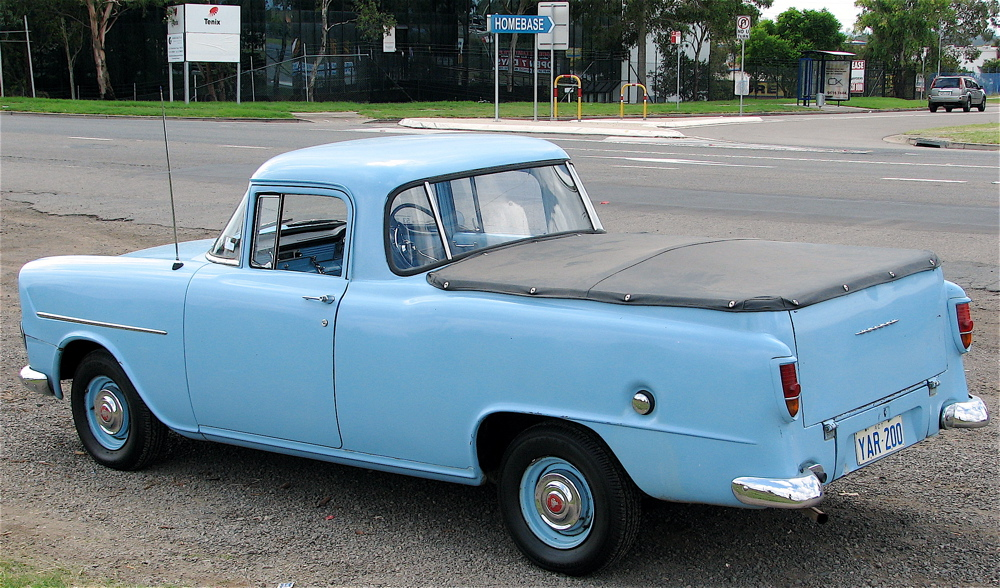
Holden Utility

== Changes ==
The EK, the first new Holden released in the 1960s, was a minor facelift of the superseded FB series, with obvious changes limited to a new grille of eight vertical bars (instead of six), and body side mouldings. In terms of finish, "Standard" vehicles were painted in a single colour with no additional trimming or fittings, while "Special", the most popular model, came with stainless steel trims along the side and a white roof, as well as chrome Special badges, and two-tone vinyl interiors. Parking lights were incorporated into the top grille bar, and other changes included new exterior badges, a revised interior trim, electric wipers (replacing the old vacuum-type ones), and a new fresh-air unit with a new ventilation air intake located forward of the windscreen.

The only significant mechanical change from the FB was the introduction of the first automatic transmission to be offered on a Holden. Marketed as the Hydra-Matic, it was a well-regarded three-speed unit which was fully imported from the United States. It was offered as an option on only the Holden Special models. Other options included more than 30 approved NASCO Accessories, such as a bonnet lock, a locking tank cap, a car heater, external rear-view mirrors, or a sunshade.

Visually, the two commercial vehicles, the Utility and Panel Van, remained almost identical to the previous model, the FB. In fact, the FB rear quarter panels and tail lights were carried over to the EK commercials. However, the carrying capacity was increased from 8 to 10 long hundredweight (410 to 510 kg) by fitting upgraded springs.

== Engines ==
Like the FB series, all EK models were powered by a 138 cubic inches (2,260 cc) inline six-cylinder engine, commonly referred to (due to its paint colour) as a "grey motor" having been bored out .061 inches (1.5 mm) over the 3-inch (76 mm) bore of earlier models, producing 75 bhp (56 kW).

== Production and replacement ==
Like the FB series, the EK was sold in several overseas markets in both left- and right-hand-drive configurations. Primary markets included New Zealand, South-East Asia, and the Pacific Islands. The EK was also sold in South Africa, where it was marketed as the car "built for a country like ours." Due to its rugged nature, it was very popular with farmers in South Africa.

In 1961, 112,680 units were sold to the public (compared to 140,336 units in 1960) and Holden employed over 18,500 people. However, sales the following year slowed as the effects of the Recession of 1960–61 began to be felt in the Australian economy, coupled with a new 40 per cent sales tax on motor cars. Further, competitors XK Ford Falcon and R Series Chrysler Valiant "compact sixes", which had a squarer less cumbersome look, further ate into Holden's market dominance. After a production run of 150,214 vehicles, the EK was replaced by the Holden EJ series in July 1962.
