= Holden (automobile) =

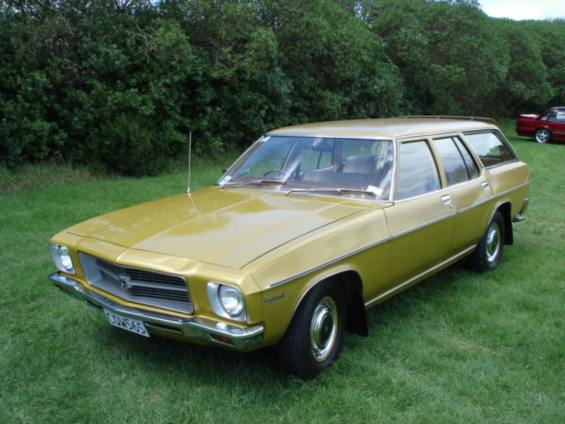
- Holden HQ Kingswood Wagon (1971–1974)

Overview
- Manufacturer: Holden
- Also called: Holden Standard; Holden Business (Taxi); Holden Belmont; Holden Special; Holden Kingswood; Holden Premier; Holden Monaro; Holden One Tonner; Holden Sandman
- Production: 1948–1984
- Assembly: Australia: Melbourne, Victoria; Fishermans Bend; Dandenong; Sydney, New South Wales; Pagewood; Adelaide, South Australia; Elizabeth; Woodville; Birkenhead; Brisbane, Queensland; Fortitude Valley; Acacia Ridge; Perth, Western Australia; Mosman Park

Body and chassis
- Class: Full-size car
- Body style: 2-door coupe utility (1951–1984); 2-door cab chassis (1971–1984); 2-door hardtop (1968–1977); 3-door panel van (1953–1984); 4-door sedan (1948–1980); 5-door station wagon (1956–1980)
- Layout: Front-engine, rear-wheel-drive
- Related: Statesman; Holden Brougham

Powertrain
- Engine: Holden straight-six motor; Holden V8 engine; Chevrolet small-block engine; Chevrolet Turbo-Thrift engine (ZA); Mazda Rotary engine (Japan)

Chronology
- Successor: Holden Commodore

The Holden is a full-sized car produced by the company of the same name across 5 generations from 1948 until 1984. The Holden is also commonly referred to by their model designation (e.g., HQ) and also the H Series. The Holden was introduced to be Australia's car, being the first full scale produced automobile exclusive to the country. Prior to which, General Motors Holden's Ltd. assembled imported CKD kits from overseas General Motors subsidiaries such as Chevrolet, Buick, Vauxhall and others. And the only other cars built in the country being Ford and Chrysler vehicle bodies fitted to imported chassis. The Holden was an instant success among Australians, being the first production car built solely for Australia's unique, rough roads.

The Holden Utility was derived from the Holden. Until 1971, the Ute retained the rear floorpan of the sedan, although it was beneath the Ute's tray floor.

The Holden was produced in all states (excluding territories and Tasmania) of Australia at varying stages of its lifetime.

Between 1960 and 1968 Holden vehicles were able to be modified to left-hand drive for markets such as Hawaii. Right-hand drive Holdens were exported all throughout its lifetime to countries such as South Africa where they were rebadged as Chevrolets.

Some versions of the Holden ended up in Japan and were sold as the Mazda Roadpacer, powered by a 13B Rotary engine.

Upon its introduction the Holden was available in a single trim level, however it soon adopted the naming of Holden Standard, Holden Business and Holden Special. The Holden Business was soon phased out due to being unpopular due to its awkward mid-range position. In 1963, the Holden Premier was introduced, placed significantly higher than the Special, with many more luxury focused components. In 1968 with the launch of the HK series, the Standard and Special were replaced by the Holden Belmont and Holden Kingswood respectively, along with Holden's first coupe model, the Holden Monaro, and also the first Long-wheelbase model, the Holden Brougham, to compete with the wildly successful Ford Fairlane. In 1971, the Brougham was replaced by the Statesman upon the launch of the fully redesigned HQ series, this model was now devoid of the Holden name, however remained essentially the same car. Also along with the HQ came the cab chassis Holden One Tonner. The Holden remained essentially unchanged throughout the 1970s, with only minor style changes, and the coupe model ceasing production after the HX series, until 1980 with the introduction of the WB series when the sedan and station wagon models were both also dropped, leaving only the ute and panelvan in the range, which gained the Statesman WB front clip. The Holden was discontinued as a whole in 1984, as Holden turned its focus entirely to the Holden Commodore.

By the time production of the Holden ceased in 1984, total production of the Holden reached 3,330,401.

== First generation (1948–1956) ==
First generation
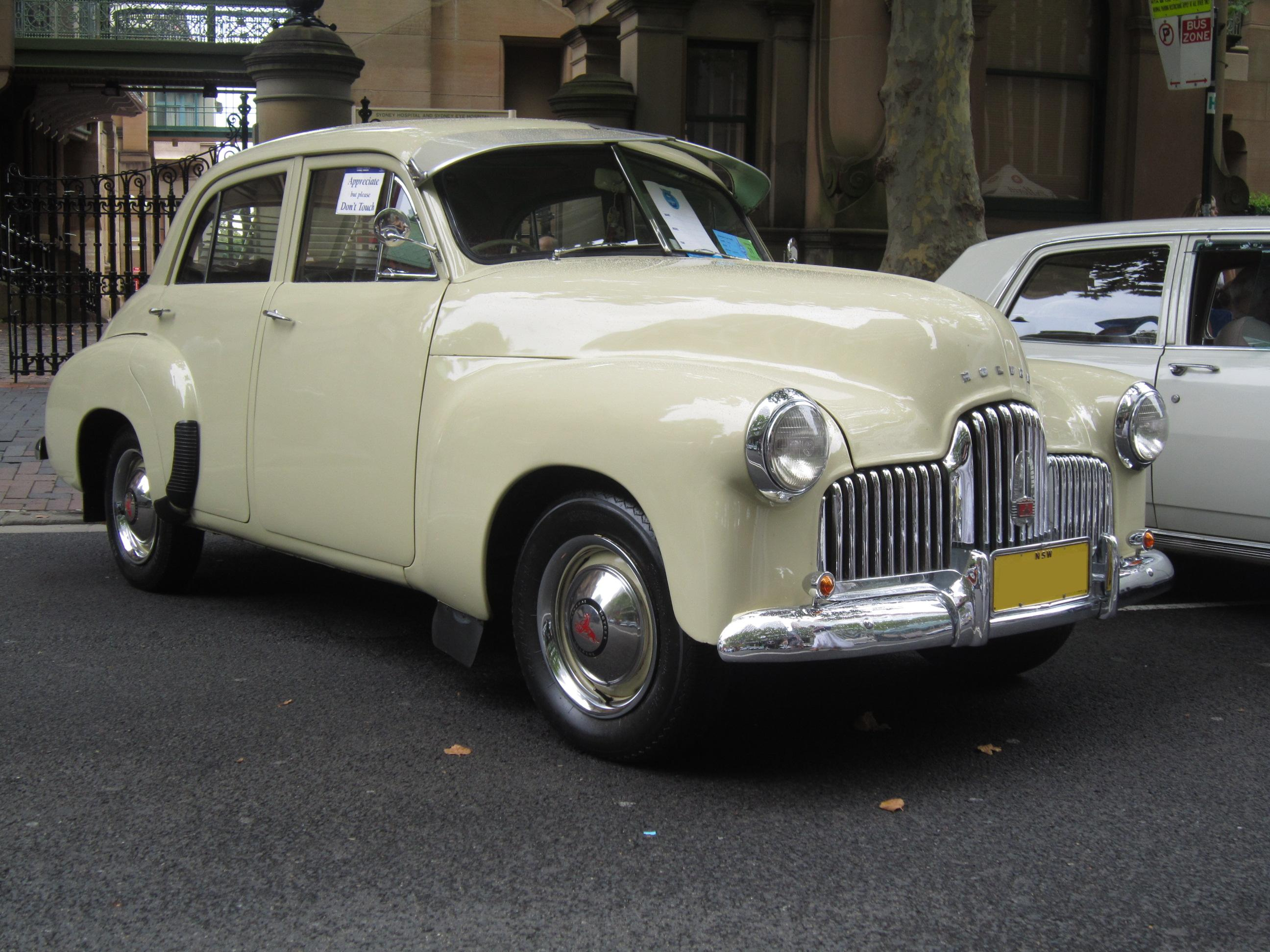
- a Holden FX

Overview
- Production: 1948–1956

Body and chassis
- Class: Full-size
- Body style: 2-door ute; 3-door panelvan; 4-door sedan
- Related: Holden 48-215; Holden 50-2106; Holden FJ

Powertrain
- Engine: 2.2L GMH '132' I6
- Transmission: 3 speed manual

The First Generation of the Holden was heavily influenced by a pre-World War II Chevrolet design and is shown clearly by its similarities to the Chevrolet Fleetline, the design was axed in the US due to it being deemed likely to small too succeed in their local market.

=== 48-215 & 50-2106 (FX) ===
Production: 120,402 examples The Holden 48-215 was the first Australian made and designed vehicle on the market, based on a stillborn Chevrolet design. Powered by a 132 cubic inch Inline 6, built by Holden, but like the car itself, based on an American design. This first model was built exclusively in Port Melbourne at the Holden Headquarters.

=== FJ ===
Production: 169,969 examples.

== Second generation (1956–1962) ==
Second generation
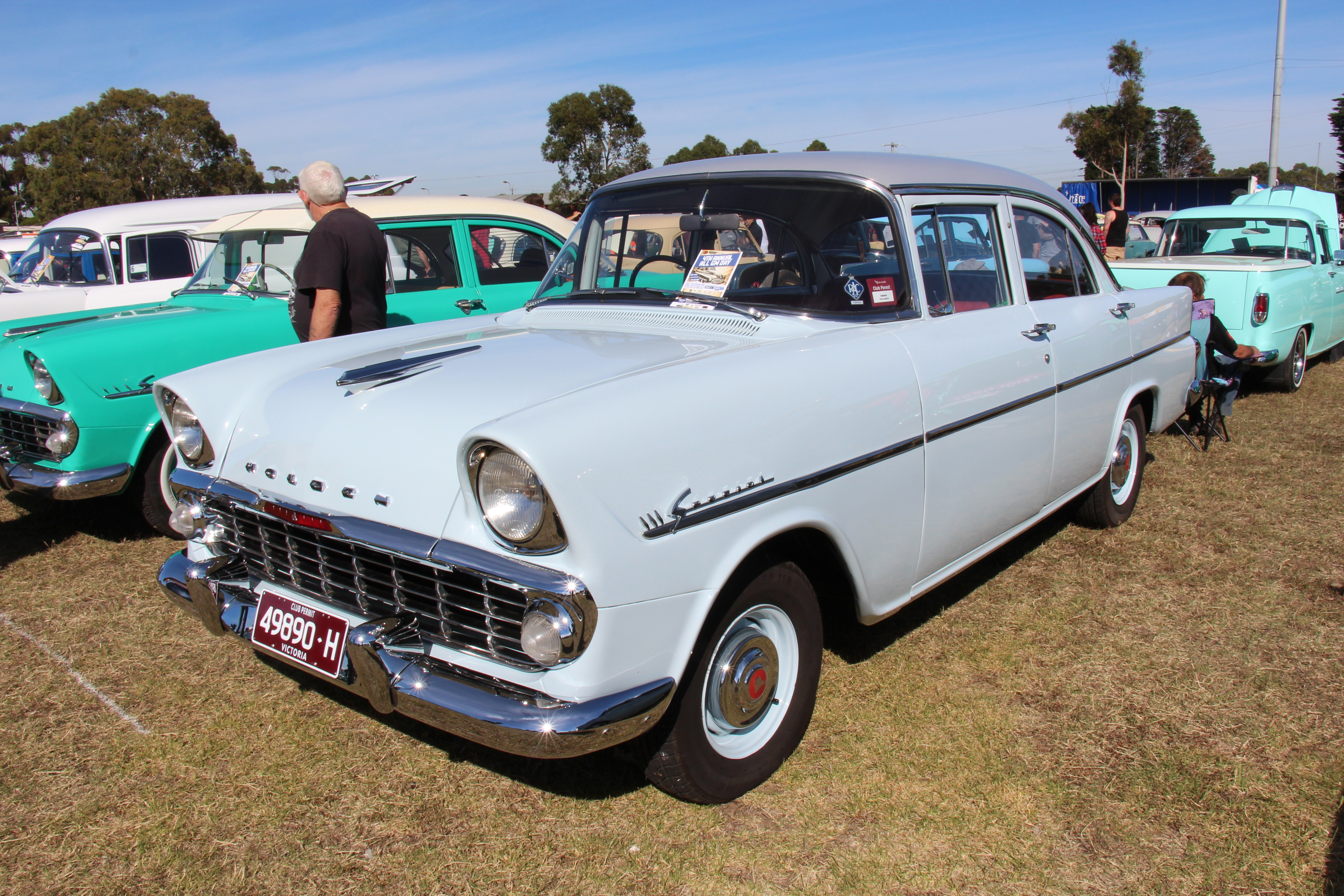
- A 1961–1962 EK Special sedan.

Overview
- Also called: Holden FE; Holden FC; Holden FB; Holden EK
- Production: 1956–1962

Body and chassis
- Class: Full-size
- Body style: 2-door ute; 3-door panelvan; 4-door sedan; 5-door station wagon

Powertrain
- Engine: 2.2L GMH '132' I6; 2.3L GMH '138' I6
- Transmission: 3 speed manual 3 speed Roto Hydramatic

The initial Second Generation Holdens were a lot more European than its predecessor, showing striking similarities to that of Vauxhall. The later Second Generation Holdens took a hard turn towards a significantly more American styling, and is very similar to, and to those unaware could be confused with a '57 Chevy.

=== FE ===
Production: 155,161 examples.

=== FC ===
Production: 191,724 examples.

=== FB ===
During the FBs model run, what would become Holden's biggest local competitor for the next over 40 years, the Ford Falcon, was introduced. Holden however retained a 49.6 percent market share in 1961, still outselling the rival Falcon by an impressive margin.

Production: 174,747 examples.

=== EK ===
The EK was a minor redesign of the FB, with the only noticeable variation between the two being in badgework and chrome trim.

Production: 150,214 examples.

== Third generation (1962–1968) ==
Third generation
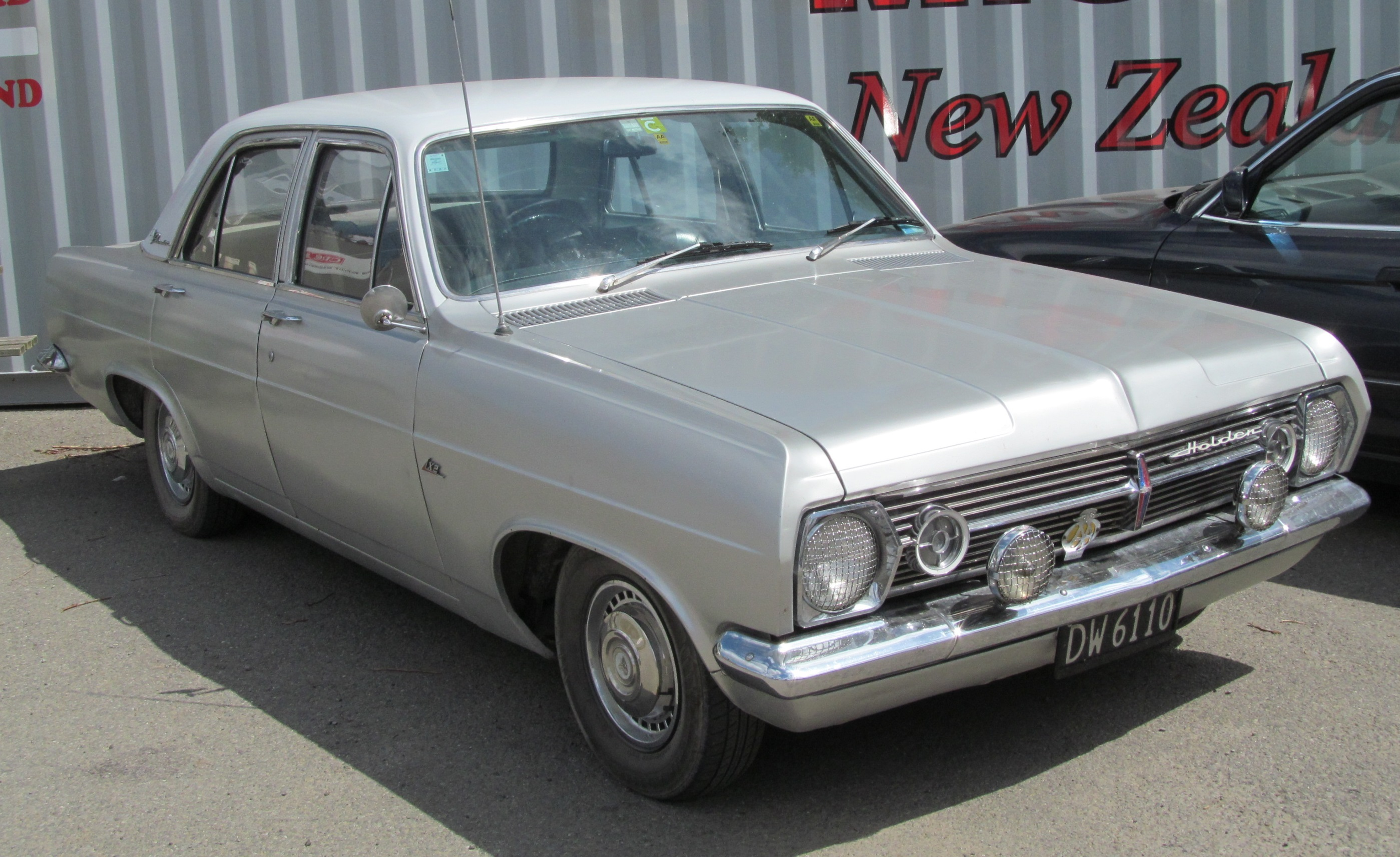
- A Holden HR Premier X2.

Overview
- Production: 1962–1968

Body and chassis
- Class: Full-size
- Body style: 2-door ute; 3-door panelvan; 4-door sedan; 5-door station wagon
- Related: Holden EJ; Holden EH; Holden HD; Holden HR

Powertrain
- Engine: 2.3L GMH '138' I6; 2.4L GMH '149' I6; 2.6L GMH '161' I6; 2.9L GMH '179' I6; 3.0L GMH '186'I6; 3.0L GMH '186X2' I6; 3.0L GMH '186S' I6
- Transmission: 3 speed manual 2 speed Powerglide; 3 speed Hydramatic

The Third Generation Holden introduced a new styling with a unique angular grille, and the introduction of the new flagship Premier specification, finally bringing bucket seats to the Holden, alongside many other luxury options. The Latter half of the Third Generation Holden was highly inspired by the 1963 Vauxhall FC Victor. With this half came advanced safety features such as front end disk brakes in the HD, and seatbelts in the HR. Holden also started experimenting with coupés during the HR era, however never came to a decision, few prototypes were created, and thus the location of such are unknown. It is a possibility these cars were crushed however GMH never commented on the fate of these vehicles.

=== EJ ===
Prouduction: 154,811 examples.

=== EH ===
The EH was only a minor redesign over the EJ, however the groundbreaking change with the EH was the introduction of the much more modern red motor, finally moving away from the outdated grey motor used in earlier models. The EH also introduced the first homologation special holden, the 'S4 special', of which 126 were produced.

Production: 256,959 examples.

=== HD ===
The HD was a massive redo of the look of the Holden, with a more refined grille, and the extended front fenders that were fought over at GM's design headquarters in Detroit.

Production: 178,927 examples.

=== HR ===
The HR was a mild but much more successful refinement over the HD, with shortened front guards, grille mounted indicators, giving the illusion of quad-headlights, giving a much more luxury design over its predecessor. Also alongside the HR came the 186 cubic-inch variant of the red motor. Along with the first mass produced sport oriented Holden engine, the 186X2 available as part of the X2 option on Holden Special and Holden Premier models.

Production: 252,352 examples.

== Fourth generation (1968–1971) ==
Fourth generation
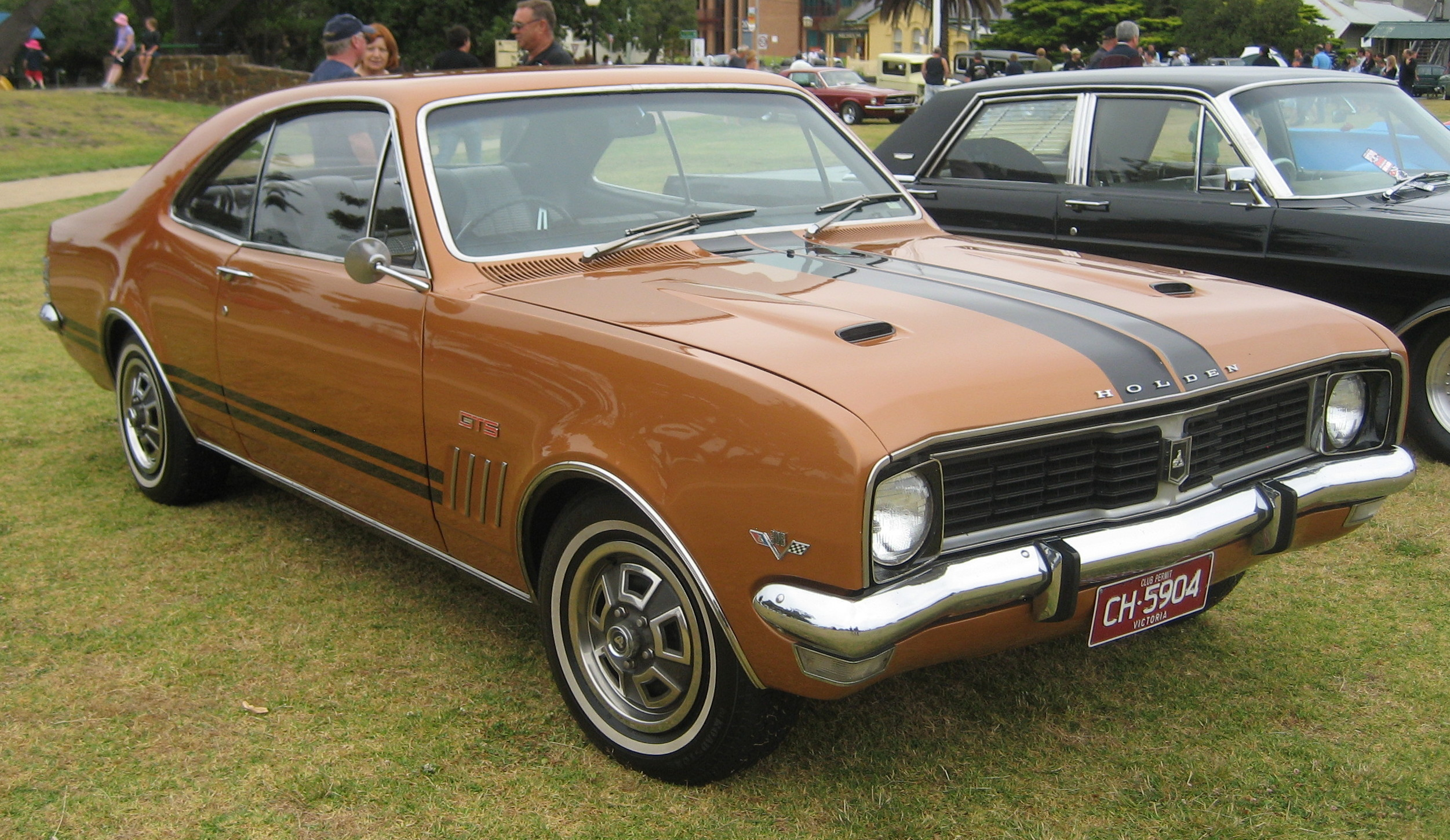
- A 1969 HT Holden Monaro GTS 350

Overview
- Also called: Holden HK; Holden HT; Holden HG; Holden Brougham; Chevrolet Kommando (ZA); Chevrolet El Camino (ZA); Chevrolet SS (ZA)
- Production: 1968–1971

Body and chassis
- Class: Full-size
- Body style: 2-door ute; 2-door hardtop; 3-door panelvan; 4-door sedan; 5-door station wagon

Powertrain
- Engine: 2.6L GMH '161' I6; 3.0L GMH '186' I6; 3.0L GMH '186S' I6; 4.1L GMH '253' V8; 5.0L 'Chevrolet 307' V8; 5.0L GMH '308' V8; 5.4L 'Chevrolet 327' V8; 5.7L 'Chevrolet 350' V8; 3.2L 'Chevrolet 194' I6 (ZA); 3.8L 'Chevrolet 230' I6 (ZA)
- Transmission: 3 speed manual 4 speed manual 2 speed Powerglide; 3 speed Trimatic

The Fourth Generation holden was a big evolution for the Holden, with the introduction of the long-awaited Monaro coupe, official use of V8 engines, and Holdens stab at the Ford Fairlane's market share, the Long-wheelbase Holden Brougham.

=== HK ===
The HK introduced the new Monaro, which had the well-received GTS trim level. The model was the 327 cub-inch small block chevrolet V8 powered Monaro GTS327.

Production: 199,039 examples.

=== HT ===
The HT was a minor revision over the HK, but with the replacement of the GTS327 by the GTS350. Also with the HT came the brand new Holden V8 engine, replacing the previous 307 Chevrolet item. The 308 cubic-inch Holden V8 was initially only available in the HT Brougham, as GMH still needed to liquidate stock of the smaller American V8s.

Production: 183,402 examples.

=== HG ===
The HG design was again, similar to the two models that came before it, The HG introduced the 308 engine to the lower specification models, along with the new TriMatic 3-speed automatic gearbox, finally bringing automatic transmissions into the mainstream line up, being less expensive than the imported PowerGlide and HydraMatic transmissions that were available prior. Although the 3-speed Turbo-HydraMatic 350 was still available behind the Holden 308, and the remaining imported Chevrolet 350.

Production: 155,787 examples.

== Fifth generation (1971–1985) ==
Fifth generation
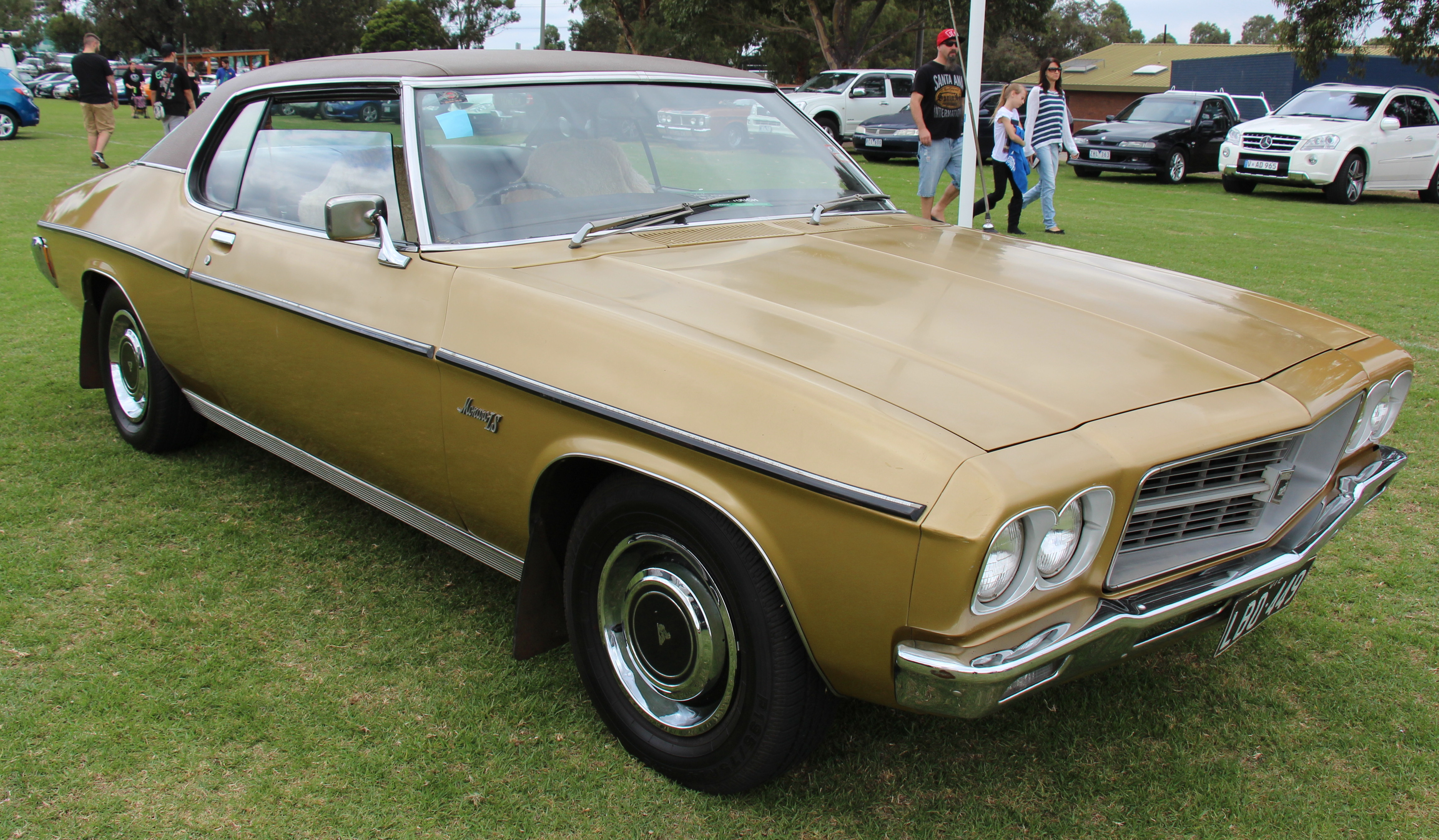
- A 1971 Holden HQ Monaro LS Coupe

Overview
- Also called: Holden HQ; Holden HJ; Holden HX; Holden HZ; Holden WB; Mazda Roadpacer
- Production: 1971–1985

Body and chassis
- Class: Full-size
- Body style: 2-door ute; 2-door cab chassis; 2-door hardtop; 3-door panelvan; 4-door sedan; 5-door station wagon
- Platform: Holden HQ platform
- Related: Statesman

Powertrain
- Engine: 2.8L GMH '173' I6; 3.3L GMH '202' I6; 4.1L GMH '253' V8; 5.0L GMH '308' V8; 5.7L 'Chevrolet 350' V8; 1.3L Mazda 13B Wankel (Japan)
- Transmission: 3 speed manual 4 speed manual 3 speed Trimatic; 3 speed Hydramatic; 3 speed Jatco 3N71B automatic (Japan)

Chronology
- Successor: Holden Commodore

The Introduction of the fifth generation of Holden in 1971 marked the first full redesign since the original 48-215 in 1948. With this change can the new Semi-monocouque architecture for coupé, sedan and station wagon models and a full body-on-chassis design for the ute, panelvan and newly introduced one tonner model. The Brougham was also dropped in favour of the new Statesman model, which no longer carried the Holden name.

=== HQ ===
The Holden HQ Marked the first ground-up redesign in the Holden's history, with a whole new body shape, chassis and suspension design. The styling of the HQ appears heavily inspired by its US counterparts, such as the Chevrolet Chevelle. The HQ was the last Holden model to feature a Chevrolet Small Block V8 until the introduction of the Series II VT Commodore in 1999. The HQ series also introduced the LS Monaro, a variant similar to the sedan and wagon's Premier specification with a more premium interior design and the four-headlight design shared with the Premier. The HQ Monaro had the headroom to be a lot heavier on options and slightly more luxury-focused than its predecessors, with Holden looking to the Torana for homologation racing. The HQ has gained a legacy as one of the most desirable classic Holdens, due to the styling both inside and out being exclusive to the HQ, and its ties to the classic muscle car look.

Production: 485,650 examples. The most of any Holden ever produced

=== HJ ===
The HJ brought a completely different styling from the HQ before it, introducing a more upmarket front end styling, and a return to a taillights integrated into the body on the rear on sedan models. The One Tonner did not receive the HJ facelift, and would retain the HQ front end styling until the release of the WB in 1980. The HJ introduced a completely revamped interior styling, that would remain relatively unchanged for the rest of the Holden's lifespan, featuring more modern styling, along with more gauges as standard, over the HQs very minimal standard offerings.

Production: 176,202 examples.

=== HX ===
The HX introduced ADR27A-compliant engines. The HX Remained relatively unchanged from the HJ, with the primary change being in the emissions compliance. The HX did bring a Limited Edition Monaro, designed as a runout model for the remaining Monaro coupe bodyshells, all 580 examples of the LE were identical to each other with a Maroon metallic exterior, cream interior and gold/bronze honeycomb wheels.

Production: 110,669 examples.

=== HZ ===
The HZ Series introduced Radial Tuned Suspension (RTS) technology, previously featured in the LX Torana. As the Monaro was discontinued in the HX Series, the HZ was only offered in Sedan, Wagon and commercial body styles. The Belmont nameplate was also dropped with the HZ, instead becoming known as simply the Holden, with the Kingswood and Premier retaining their titles and general design philosophy.

Production: 154,155 examples.

=== WB ===
With the release of the WB range, the sedan and station wagon bodystyles were dropped, leaving only the Commercial body styles (ute, panelvan and one tonner/cab chassis). The WB Series introduced the Blue motor, bringing an end to the Red Motor's 17 year run, although, retaining the displacements seen in the HZ Series Red Motors, with upgrades such as better Crankshaft balancing, more modern seals and bearings, among others. The One Tonner at long last, received a much needed facelift for the WB Series, discontinuing the HQ styled front clip after 9 years of production.

When the WB ended production, production of the Holden came to an end after 36 years, with Holden moving their focus to its smaller Commodore model.

Production: 60,231 examples.

== Variants ==
- Holden Standard
- Holden Business
- Holden Special
- Holden Premier
- Holden Belmont

And its derivative Holden SS

- Holden Kingswood
- Holden Monaro

And its commercial vehicle based derivative the Holden Sandman.

=== Holden Overlander ===
The Holden overlander was a 4x4 converted version of the Holden ute and wagon, optioned with a Holden 308 V8, Turbo 400 gearbox, along with axels & transfer case manufactured specially for the Overlander by Dana in the USA. The Overlander was made by Arthur Hayward in Launceston, Tasmania from brand new Holden utes and wagons. GMH denied selling bare shells, however did retain their factory warranty for buyers of the Overlander.

== Body styles ==
=== Sedan ===
The first body style ever introduced for the Holden in 1948 with the FX, it consisted of a 4-door, 5 seat design with a full size boot separated from the cabin space by the rear seat cushion.

=== Coupe Utility ===
The Coupe Utility or ‘Ute’ Was introduced in 1951 to compete with Ford Australia's wildly popular Coupe Utility, it maintained the sedans front doors forwards, yet had a completely redesigned rear end. In 1971, Alongside the Panel Van, the Ute was given a Body-on-Chassis style design over the classic unibody style.

=== Panel Van ===
The Panel Van was introduced shortly after the Ute, essentially a Commercial van based on the Ute with a Fixed sheet metal hardtop.

=== Wagon ===
The Wagon was introduced with the FE Generation, it was essentially identical to the sedan forward of the rear doors, which themselves were modified to flow with the extended roofline, with a squarer rear end, a lift back rear hatch and the rear seat back, this time acting as a luggage divider rather than completely separating the boot space from the cabin.

=== Coupe ===
The much anticipated Coupé body style was introduced in 1968 in the HK range to compete with the Falcon Futura and Valiant coupes of the time, the Coupe's front clip and boot-lid were essentially the only crossover panels between the Coupé and Sedan, with restyled rear quarter panels and extended doors.

=== Long-Wheelbase Sedan ===
The Long-Wheelbase Brougham was introduced to compete against the Ford Fairlane, the Brougham was essentially a standard Holden Sedan with an extended boot and some adjustment to the rear of the cabin space. In 1971, the Brougham was phased out and replaced by the Statesman, a model of essentially the same goal, however the Statesman saw some success in chipping into the Fairlane's market share.

=== One Tonner ===
The One Tonner was introduced alongside the HQ range in 1971, the ‘Tonner was essentially a Coupe Utility with the rear tray section removed implementing a Cab-Chassis design, the ‘Tonner also featured an extended Ladder frame.

== See also ==
- Statesman (automobile)
- Holden Monaro
- Holden One Tonner
- Holden straight-six motor
- Holden V8 engine
