= Holden HQ =

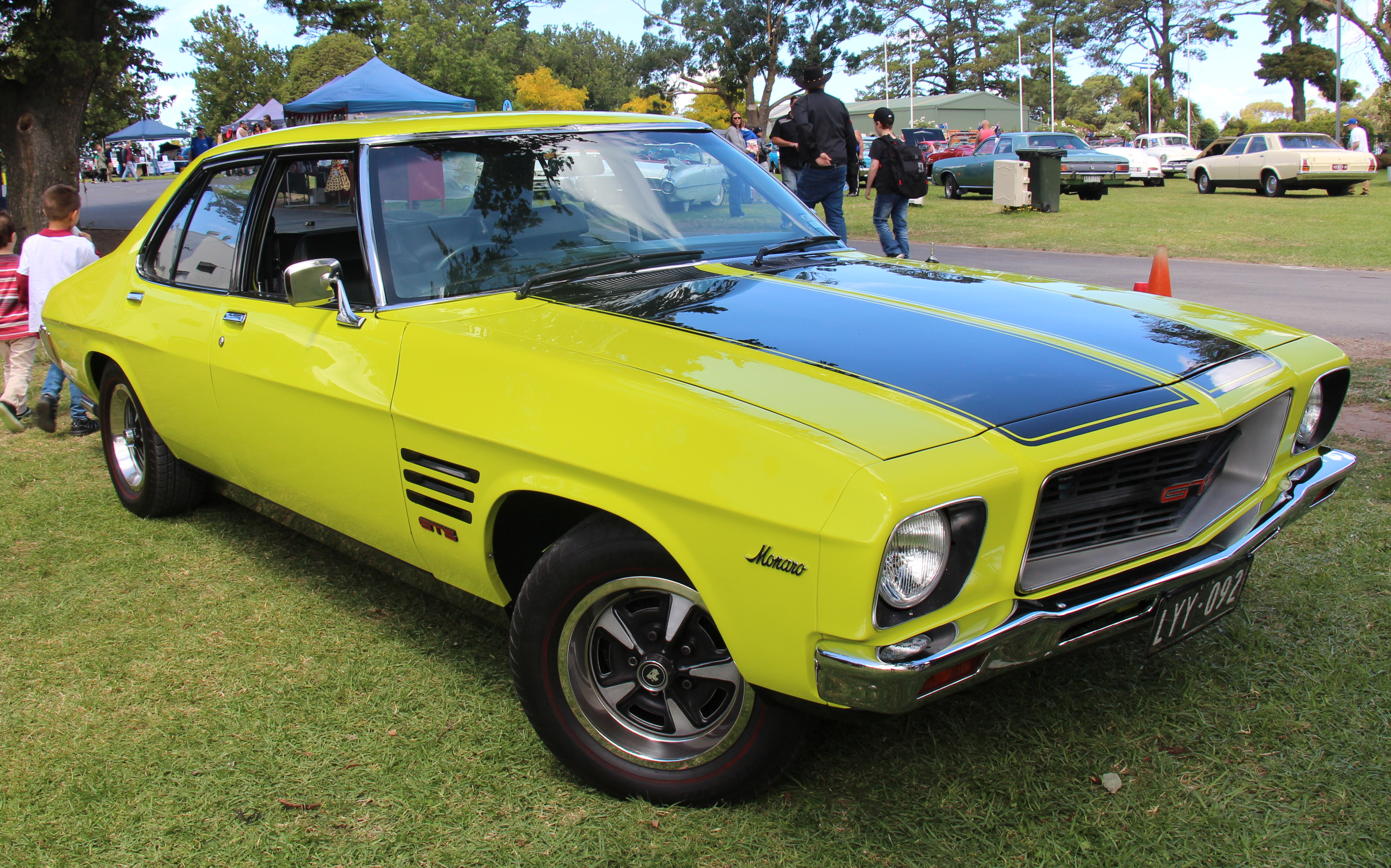
- 1974 Holden Monaro GTS Sedan

Overview
- Manufacturer: Holden (General Motors)
- Also called: Chevrolet Kommando (ZA); Chevrolet El Camino (ZA); Chevrolet El Toro (ZA)
- Production: July 1971 – October 1974
- Assembly: Adelaide, South Australia (Elizabeth); Melbourne, Victoria (Dandenong); Sydney, New South Wales (Pagewood); Wellington, New Zealand (Trenham)
- Designer: Phillip Zmood

Body and chassis
- Body style: 4-door sedan 5-door wagon 2-door coupé 2-door coupé utility 2-door panel van 2-door cab chassis
- Layout: FR layout
- Platform: Holden HQ platform
- Related: Holden Belmont; Holden Kingswood; Holden Premier; Statesman HQ; Holden One Tonner; Holden SS; Holden Sandman

Powertrain
- Engine: 2.8L GMH '173' I6; 3.3L GMH '202' I6; 4.1L GMH '253' V8; 5.0L GMH '308' V8; 5.7L 'Chevrolet 350' V8
- Transmission: 3-speed GMH manual Aussie 4-speed 3-speed "Tri-Matic" automatic

Dimensions
- Wheelbase: 111 in (2,800 mm); 114 in (2,900 mm) (wagon)
- Length: 187.5 in (4,760 mm); 190 in (4,800 mm) (wagon)
- Width: 74.0 in (1,880 mm); 73.9 in (1,880 mm) (wagon)
- Height: 54.0 in (1,370 mm); 54.8 in (1,390 mm) (wagons); 53.1 in (1,350 mm) (Monaro)
- Curb weight: 2,950 lb (1,340 kg) (Kingswood sedan)

Chronology
- Predecessor: Holden HG
- Successor: Holden HJ

The Holden HQ series is a range of automobiles that was produced by Holden in Australia from 1971 to 1974. The HQ was released on 15 July 1971, replacing the Holden HG series. It was the first ground-up redesign of the Holden line since its original release in 1948, and included an all-new body, chassis, and suspension. The HQ was later developed into a series of successor models, finally ending production when the WB series was discontinued in 1985.

== Model range ==
The mainstream HQ passenger car range consisted of four-door sedan and five-door station wagon models in three trim levels.

- Holden Belmont sedan
- Holden Kingswood sedan
- Holden Premier sedan
- Holden Belmont station wagon
- Holden Kingswood station wagon
- Holden Premier station wagon

The long wheelbase luxury model, "Statesman by GMH" consisted of one body style (four-door sedan) and was available in two trim levels.

- Statesman
- Statesman Deville

A Holden SS sedan was released in August 1972. Although marketed as a separate model in reality it was a Belmont V8 sedan fitted with the XV2 option package.

The Monaro range initially consisted only of two-door coupes.

- Holden Monaro
- Holden Monaro GTS
- Holden Monaro GTS 350
- Holden Monaro LS

Two four-door sedan variants of the Monaro GTS were released in March 1973 and similarly to the SS the new sports sedans were a special vehicle package optioned on a lesser model, in this case on a V8 Kingswood sedan. Option XV4 was the HQ GTS sedan. Option XW8 was the HQ GTS350 sedan.

The commercial vehicle range included coupe utility, panel van and cab chassis truck models.

- Holden Belmont utility
- Holden Kingswood utility
- Holden Belmont panel van
- Holden One Tonner

The One Tonner, which was new for the HQ series, was a cab chassis truck. The Sandman was a sports utility and panel van model from January 1974.

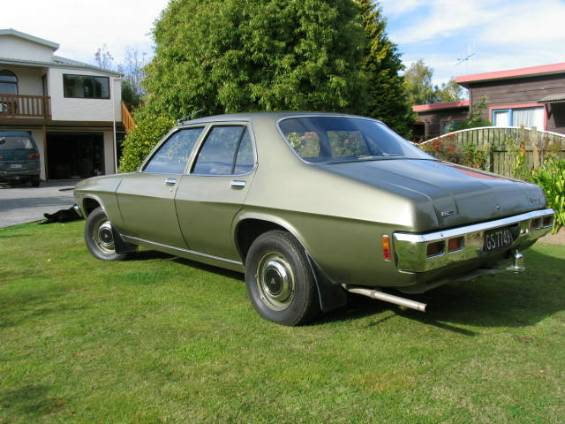
Holden Kingswood sedan

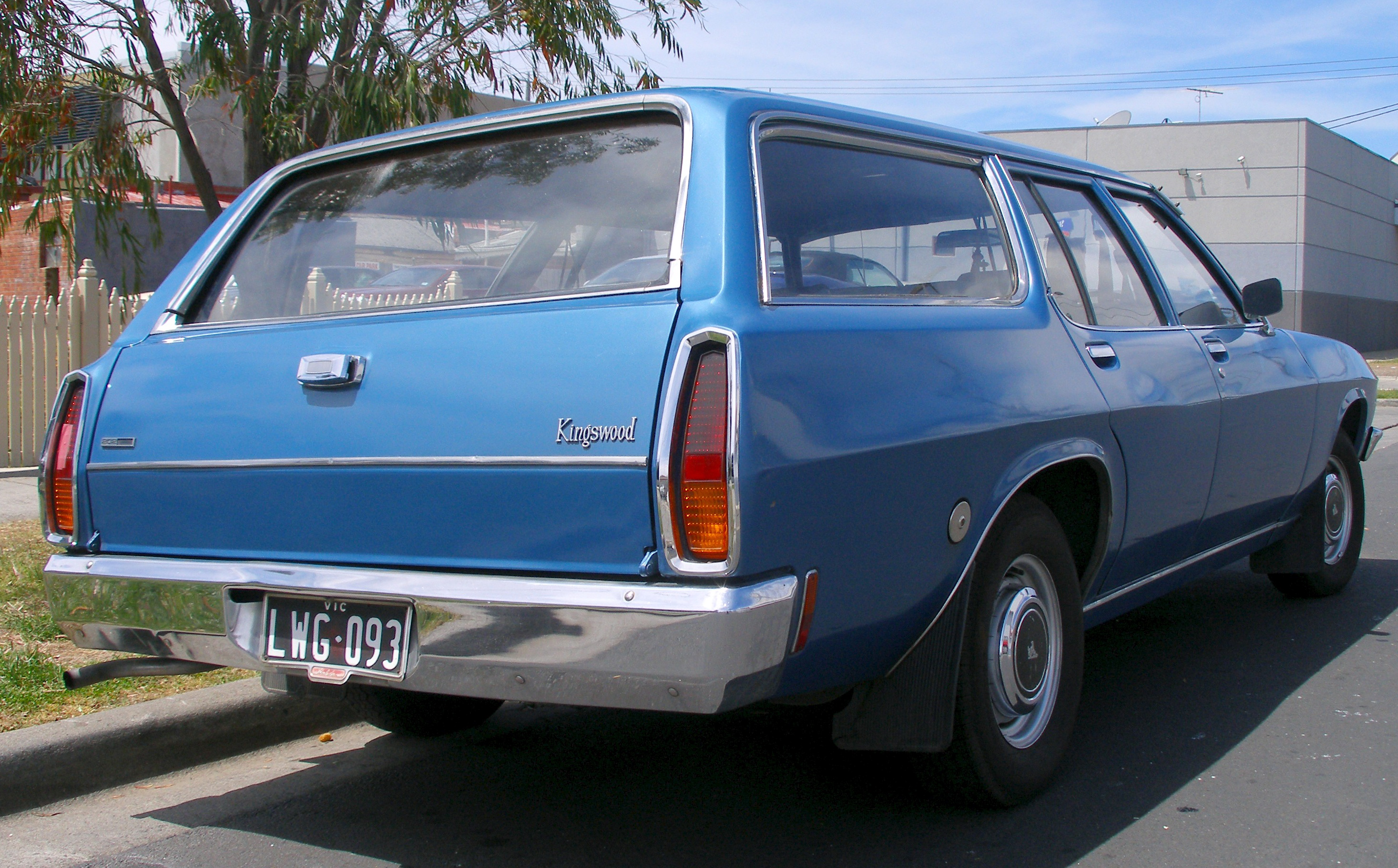
Holden Kingswood wagon

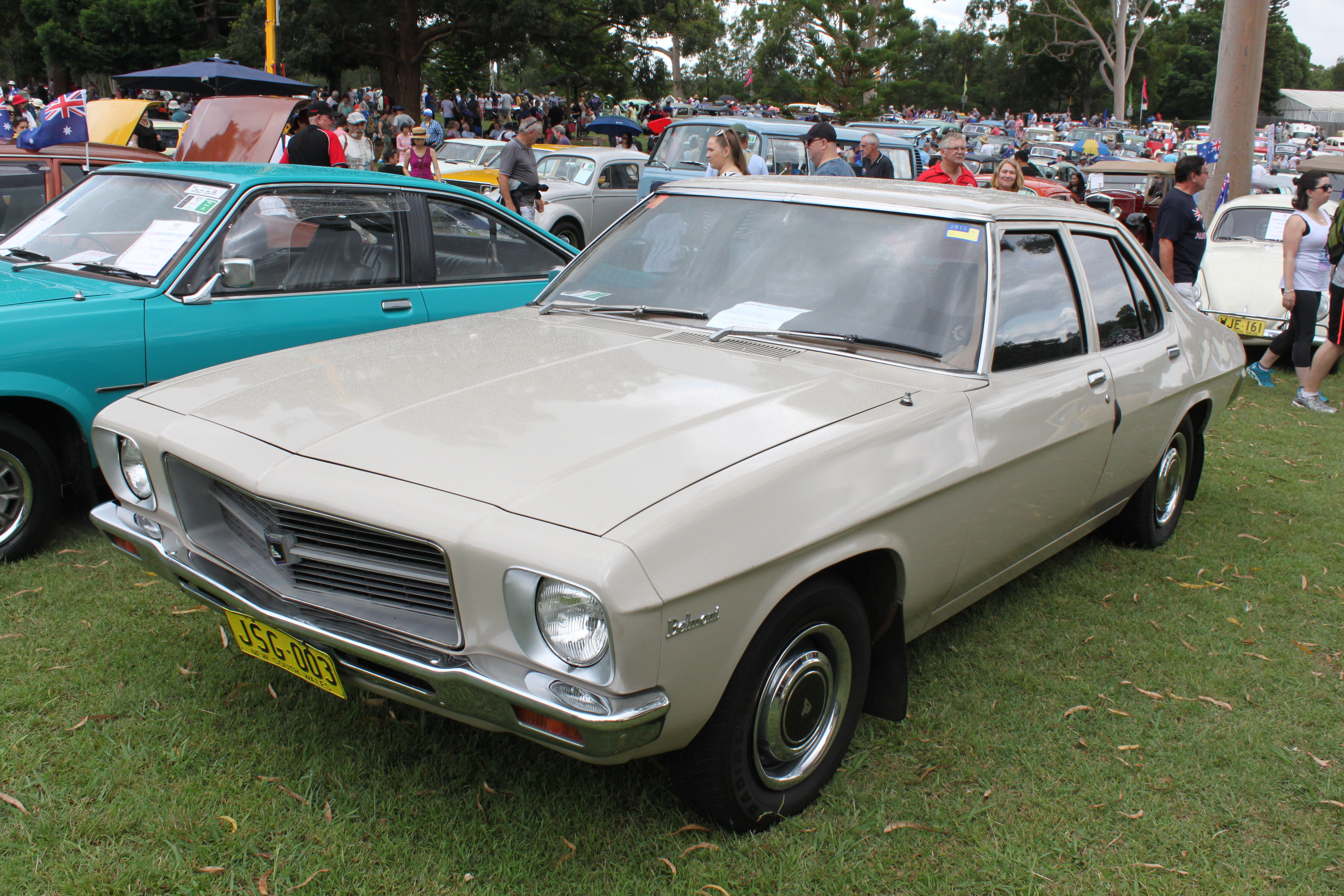
Holden Belmont sedan

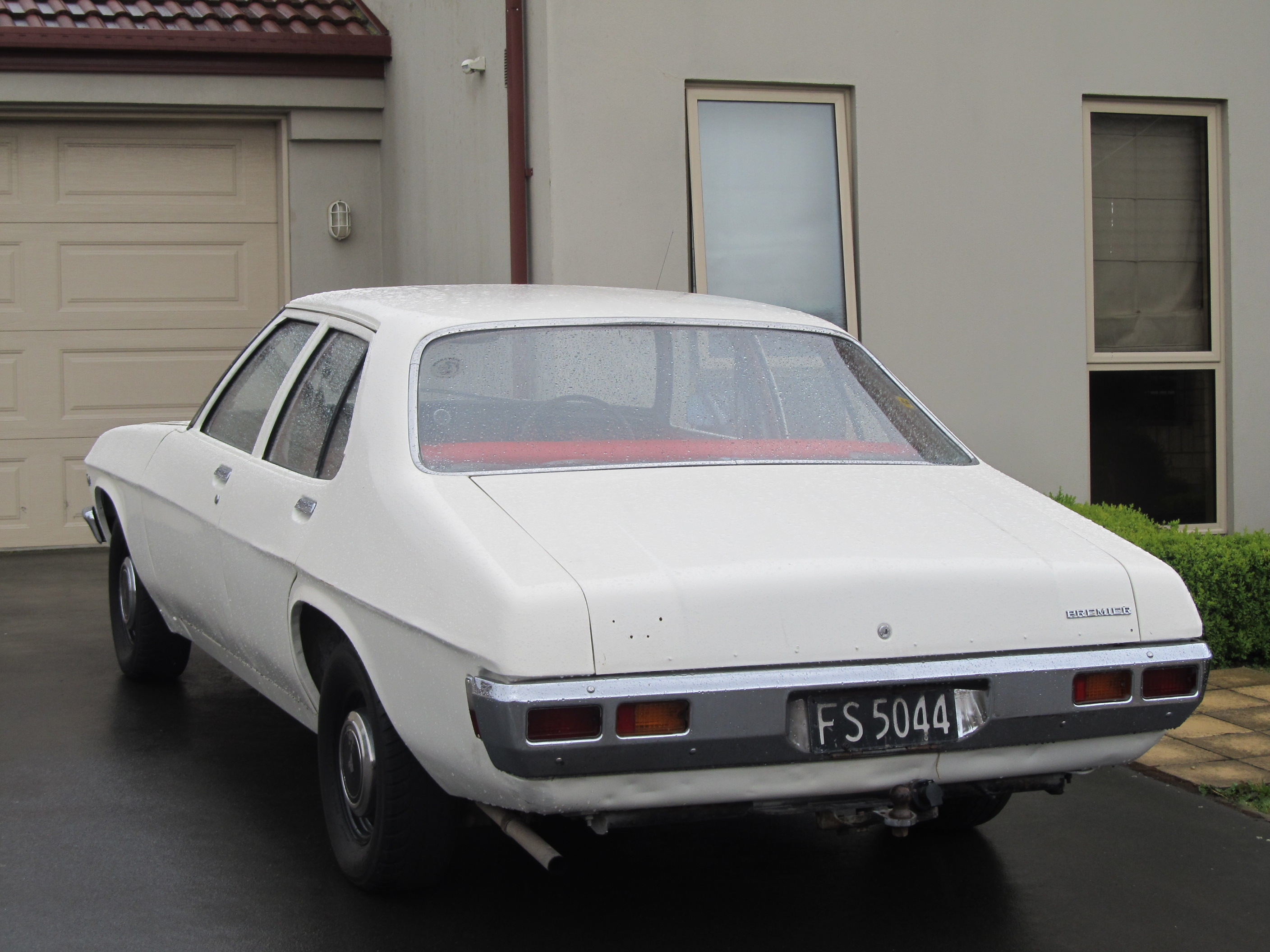
Holden Belmont sedan

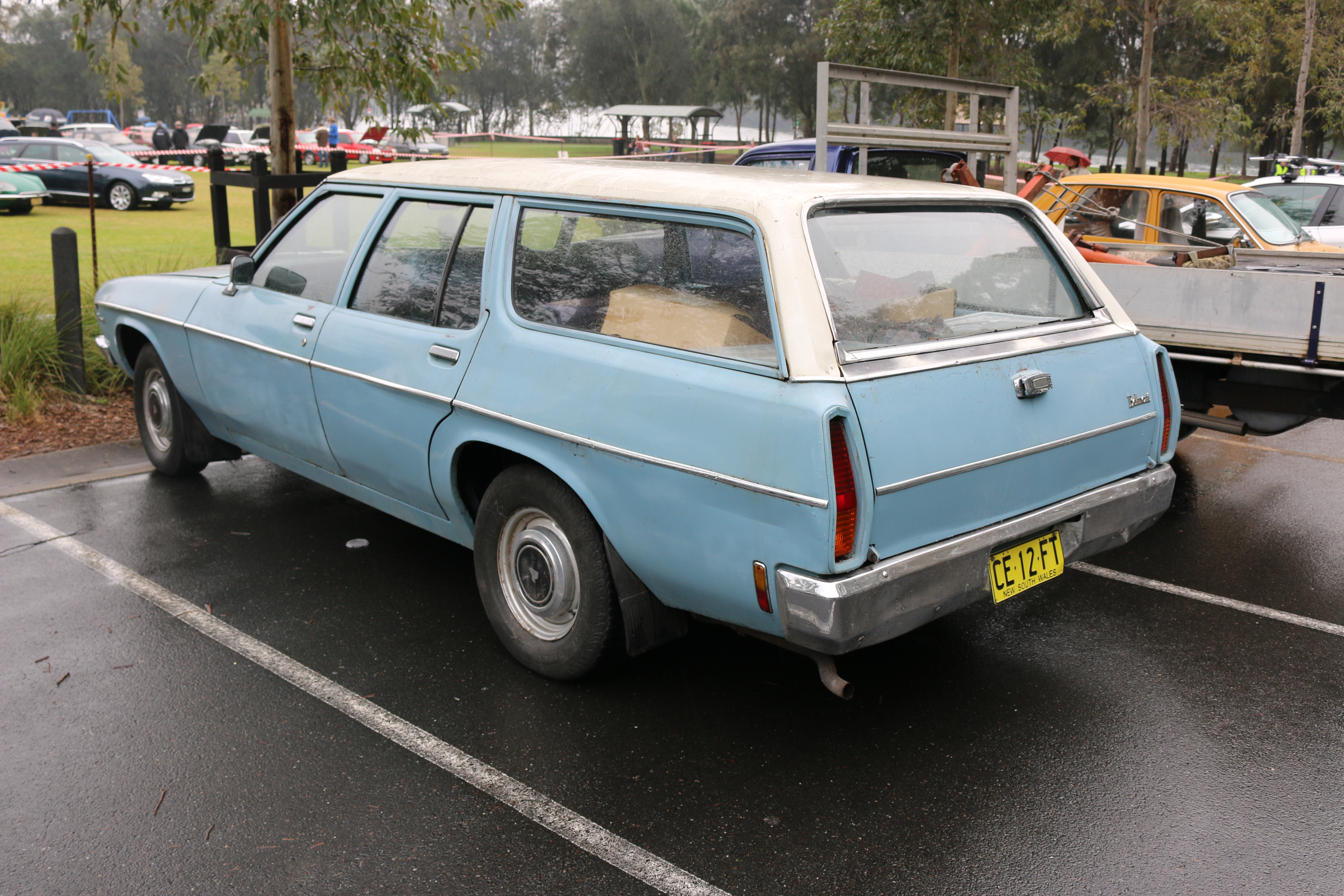
Holden Belmont wagon

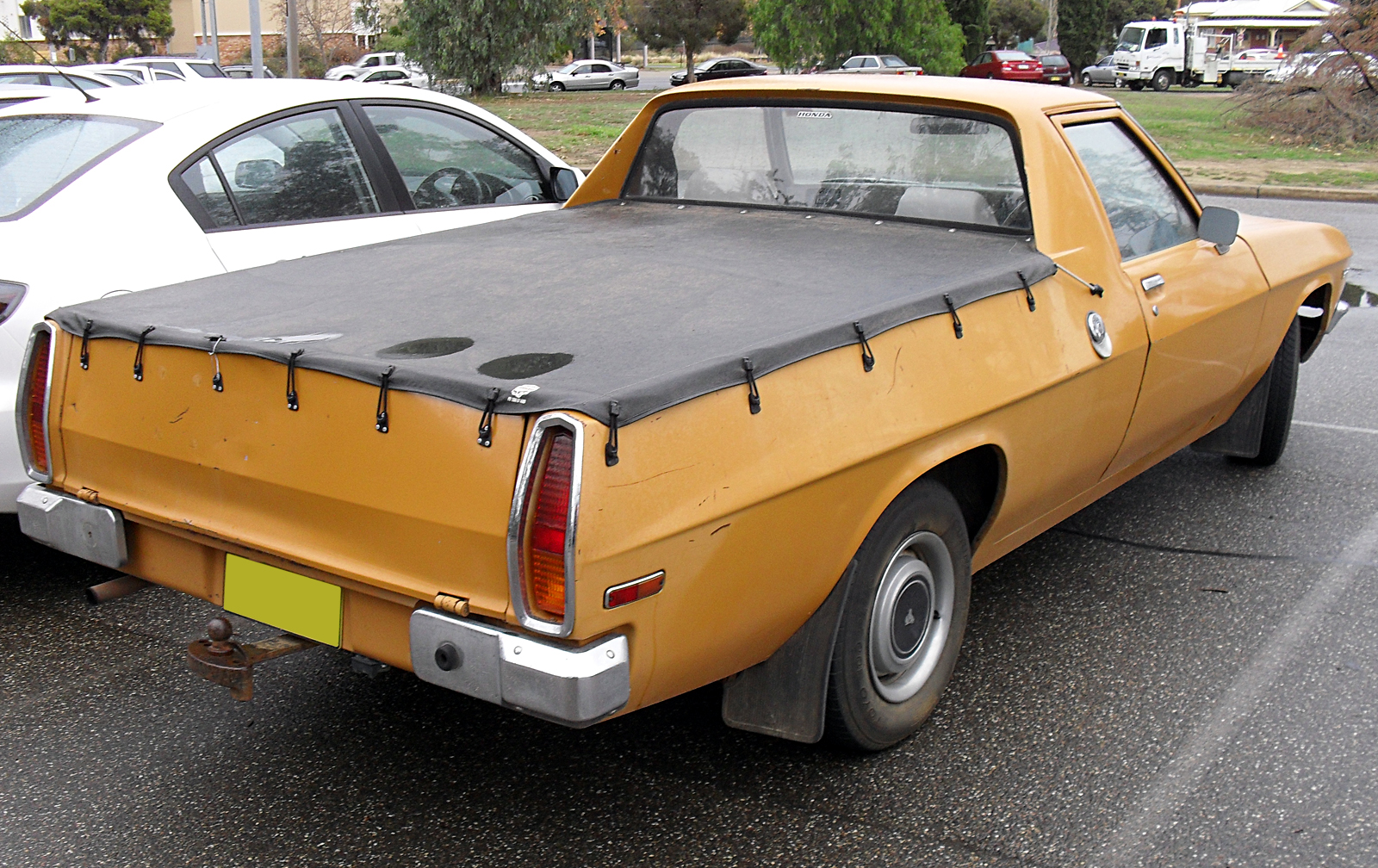
Holden Belmont utility

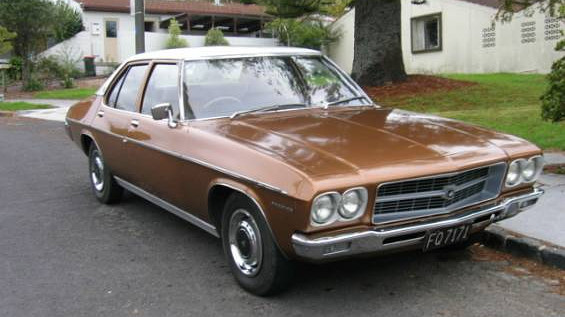
Holden Premier sedan

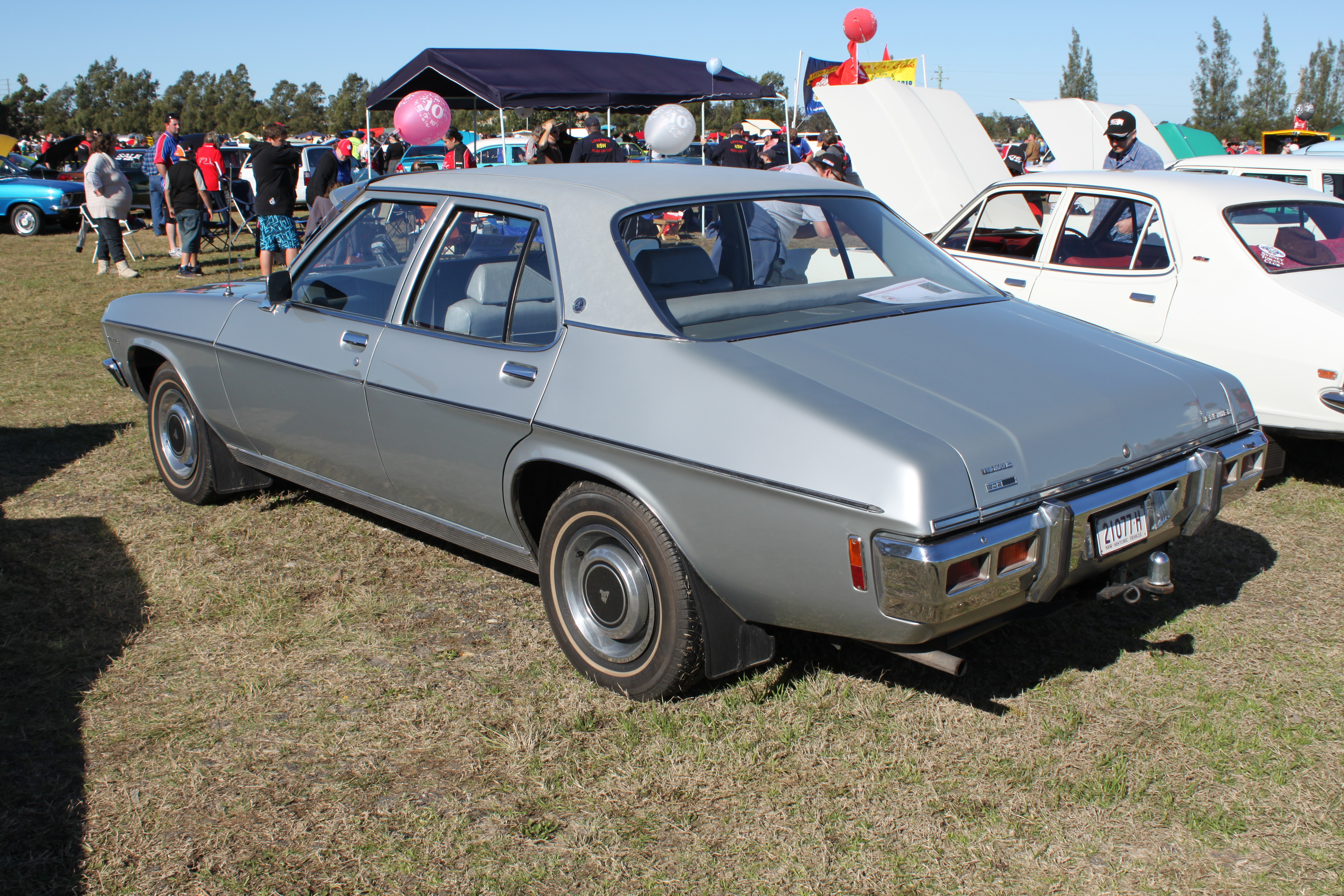
Holden Premier sedan

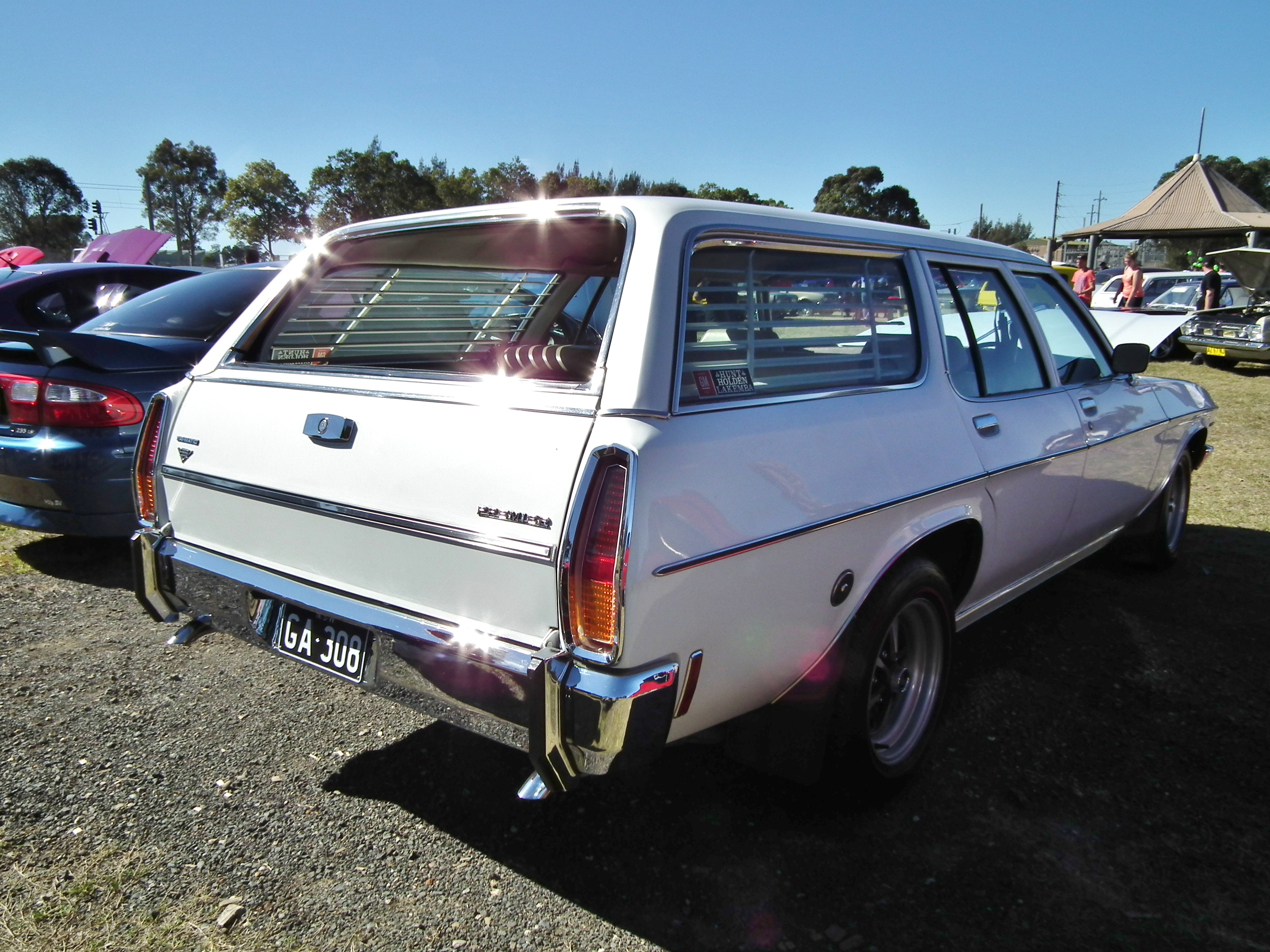
Holden Premier wagon (with non-standard wheels)

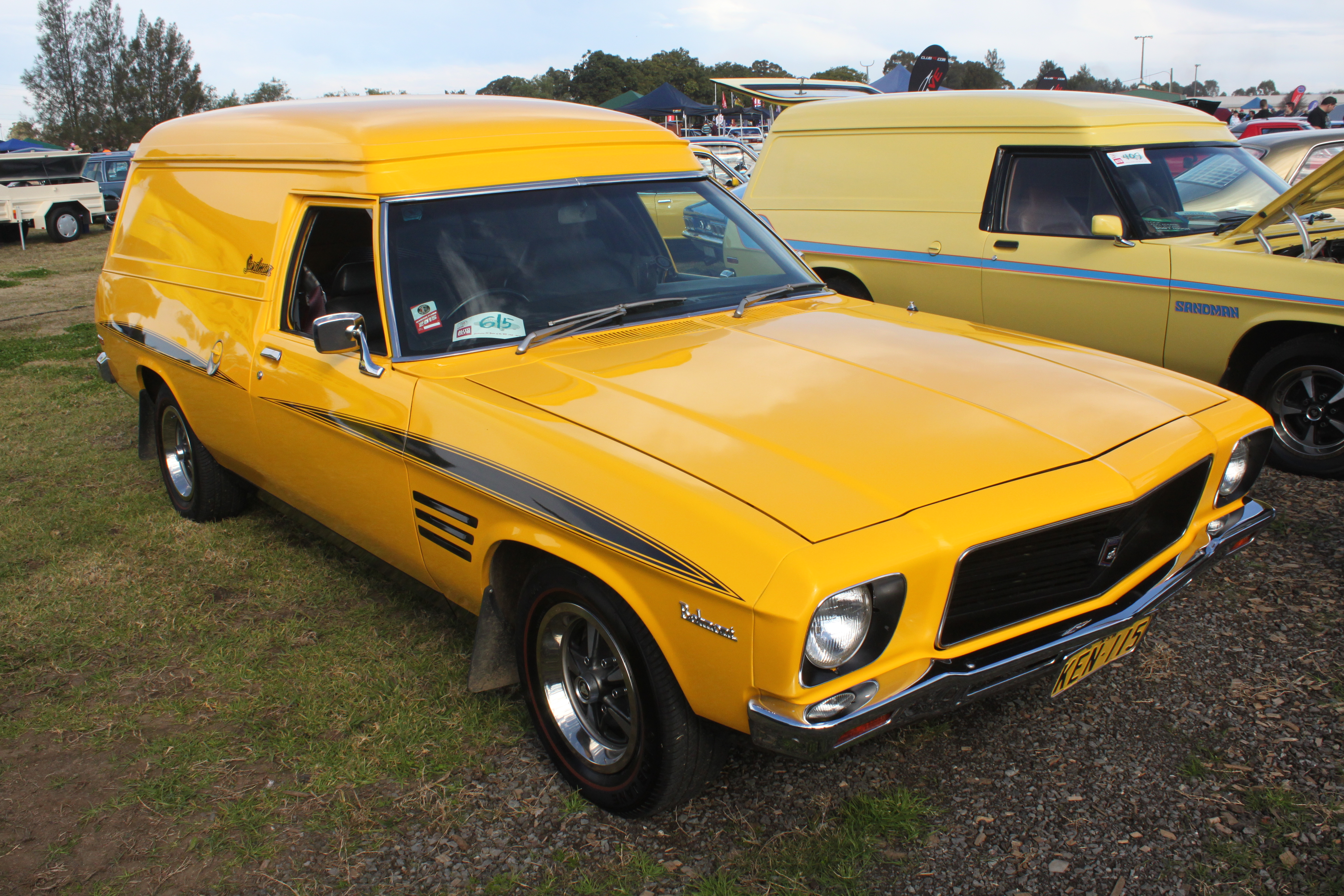
Holden Belmont Sandman panel van

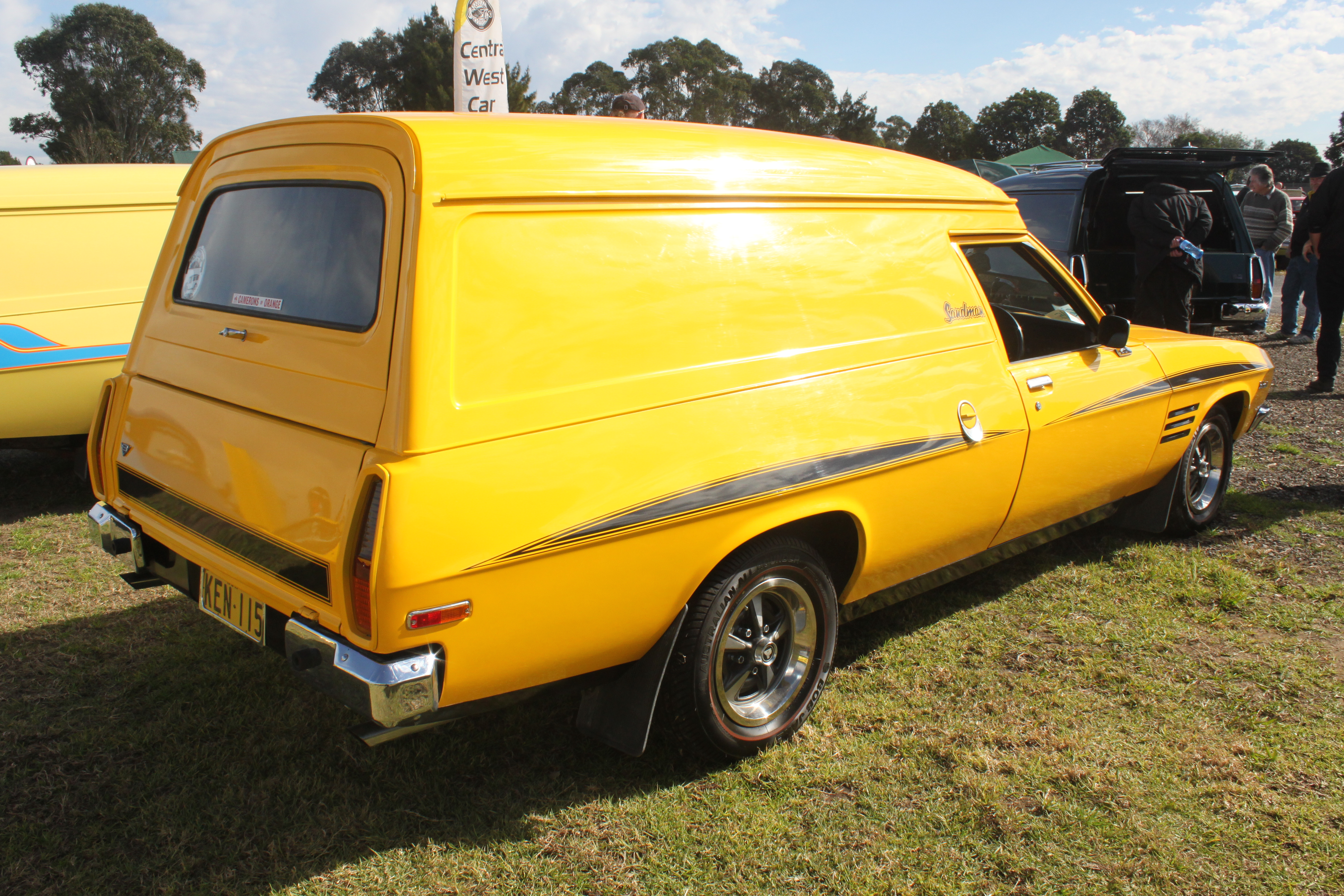
Holden Belmont Sandman panel van

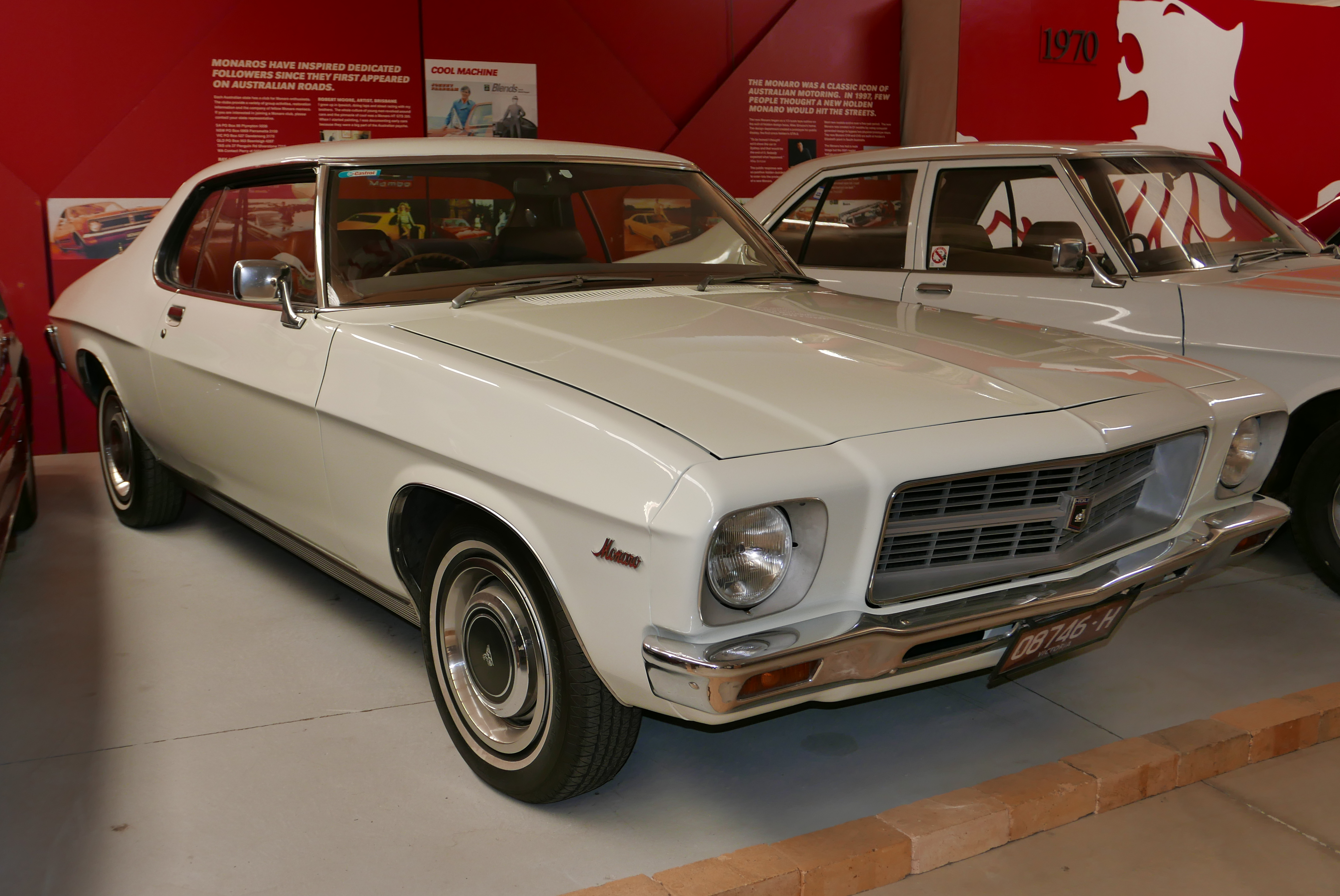
Holden Monaro

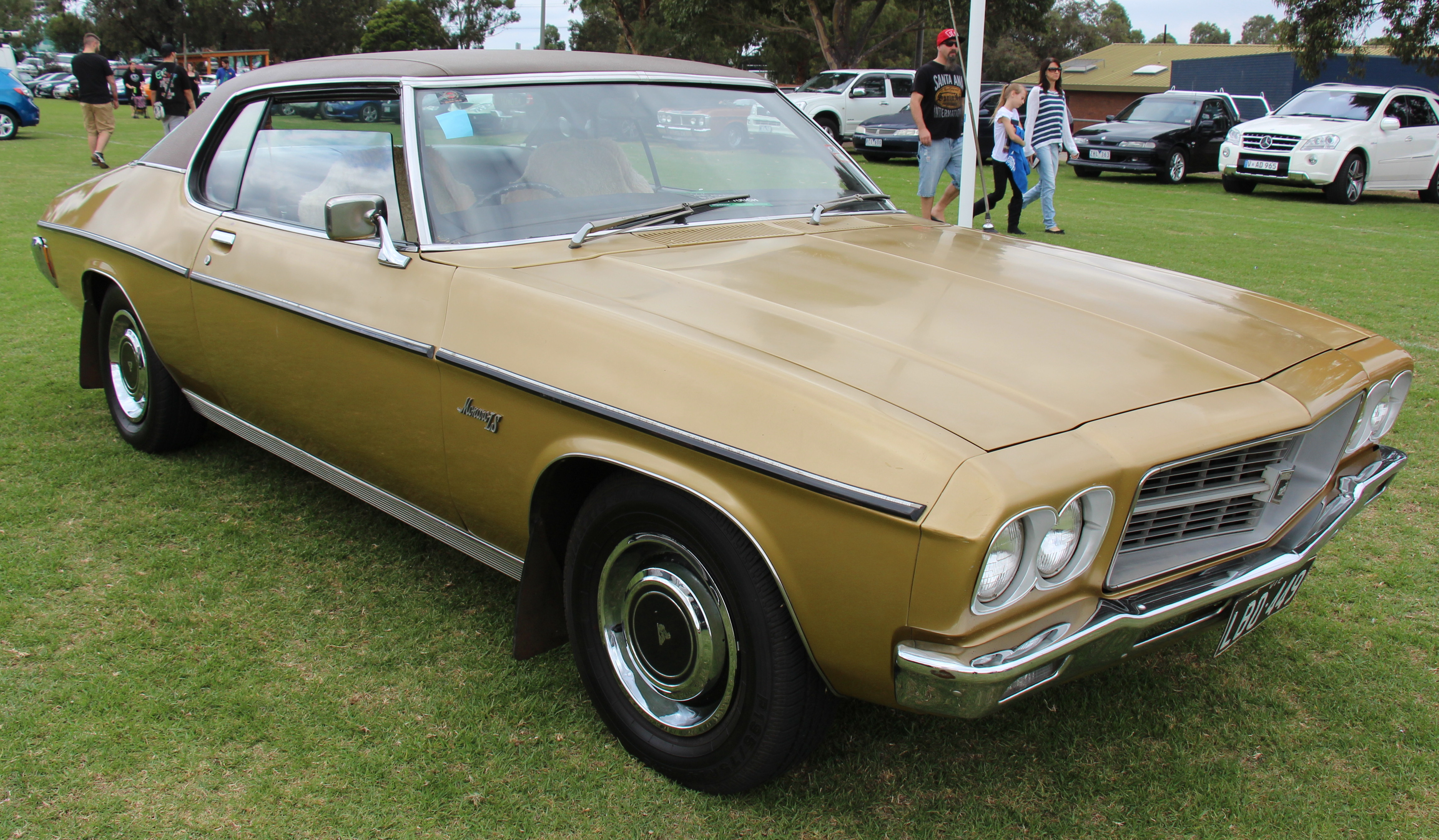
Holden Monaro LS

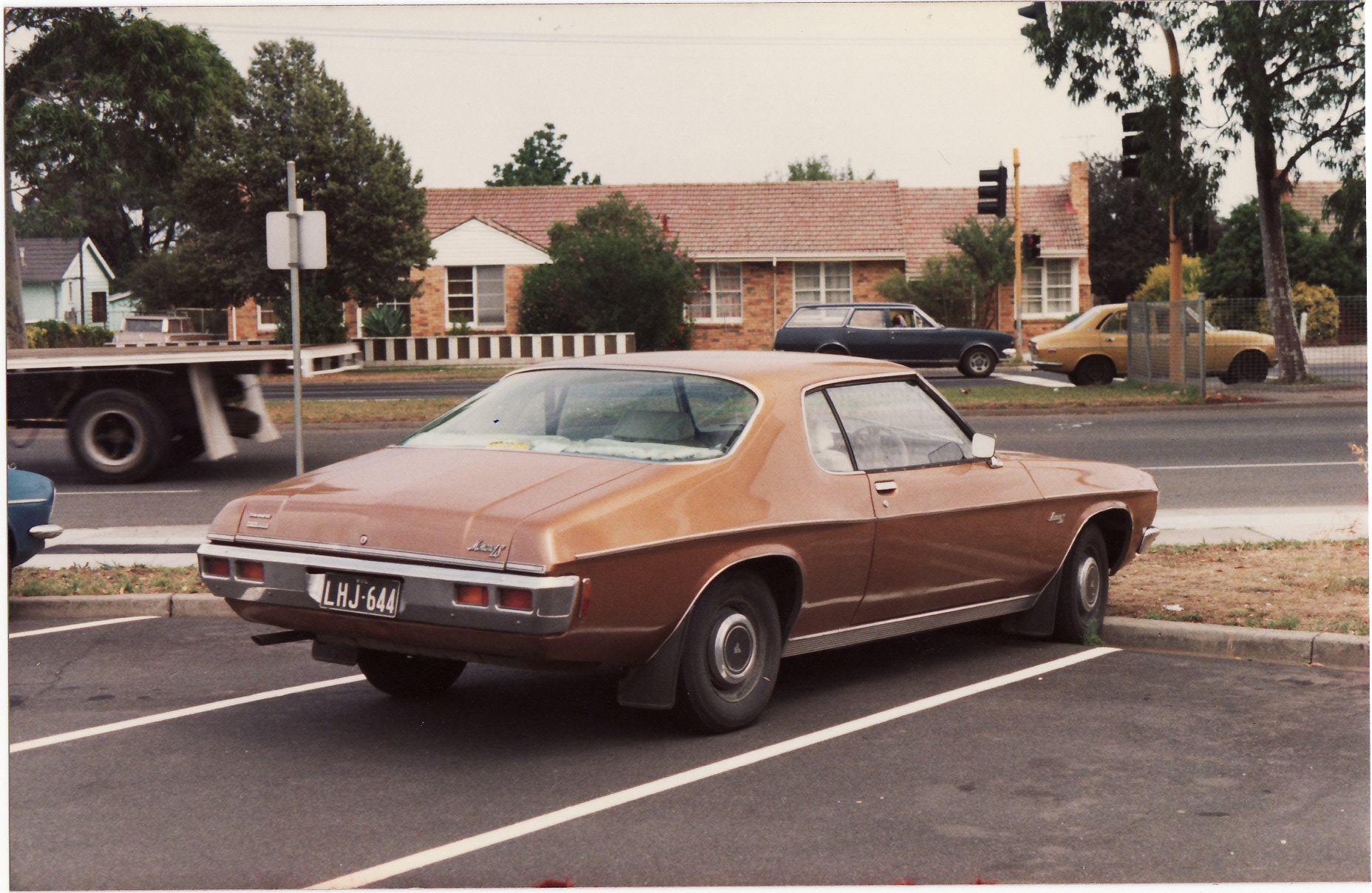
Holden Monaro LS

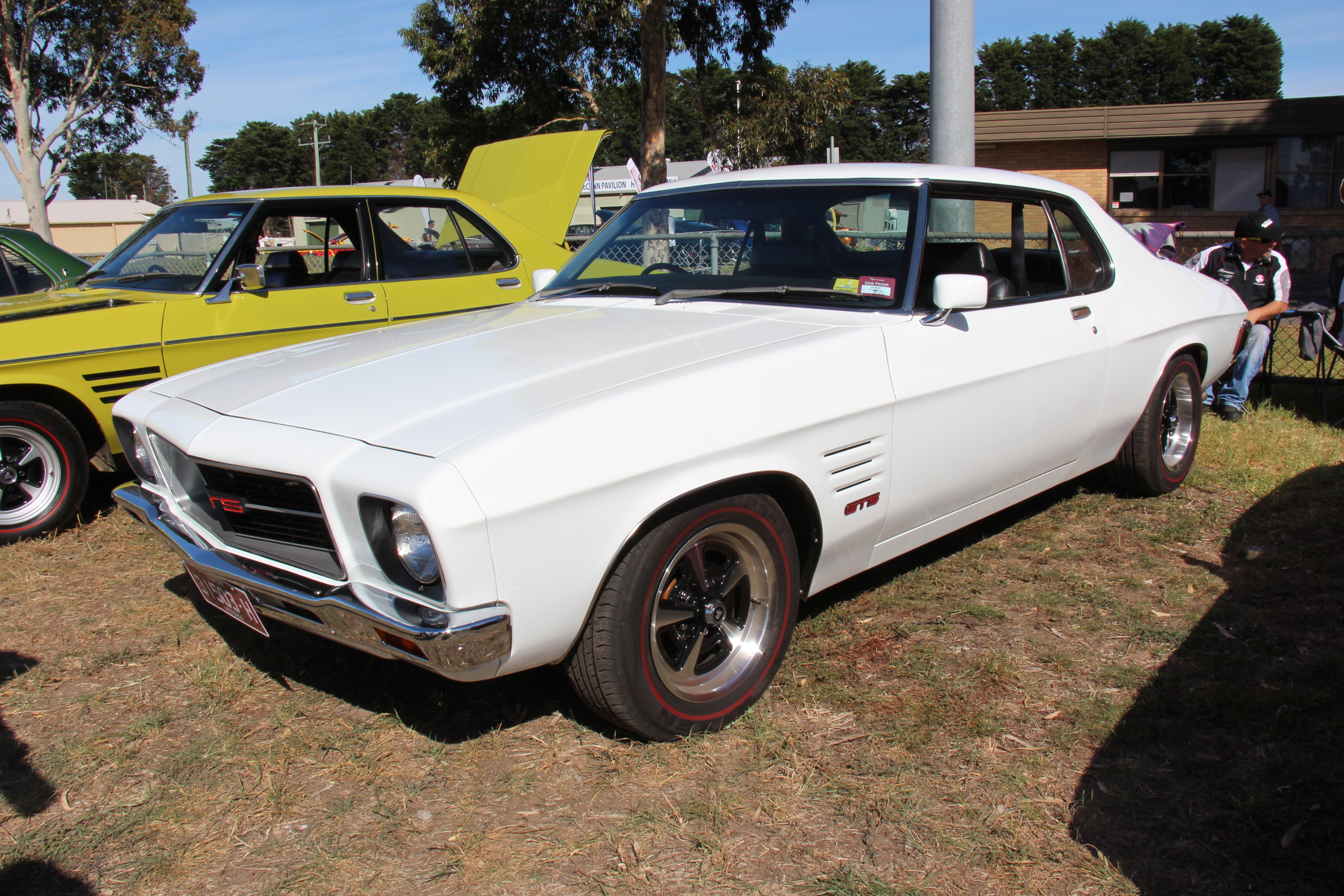
Holden Monaro GTS coupe

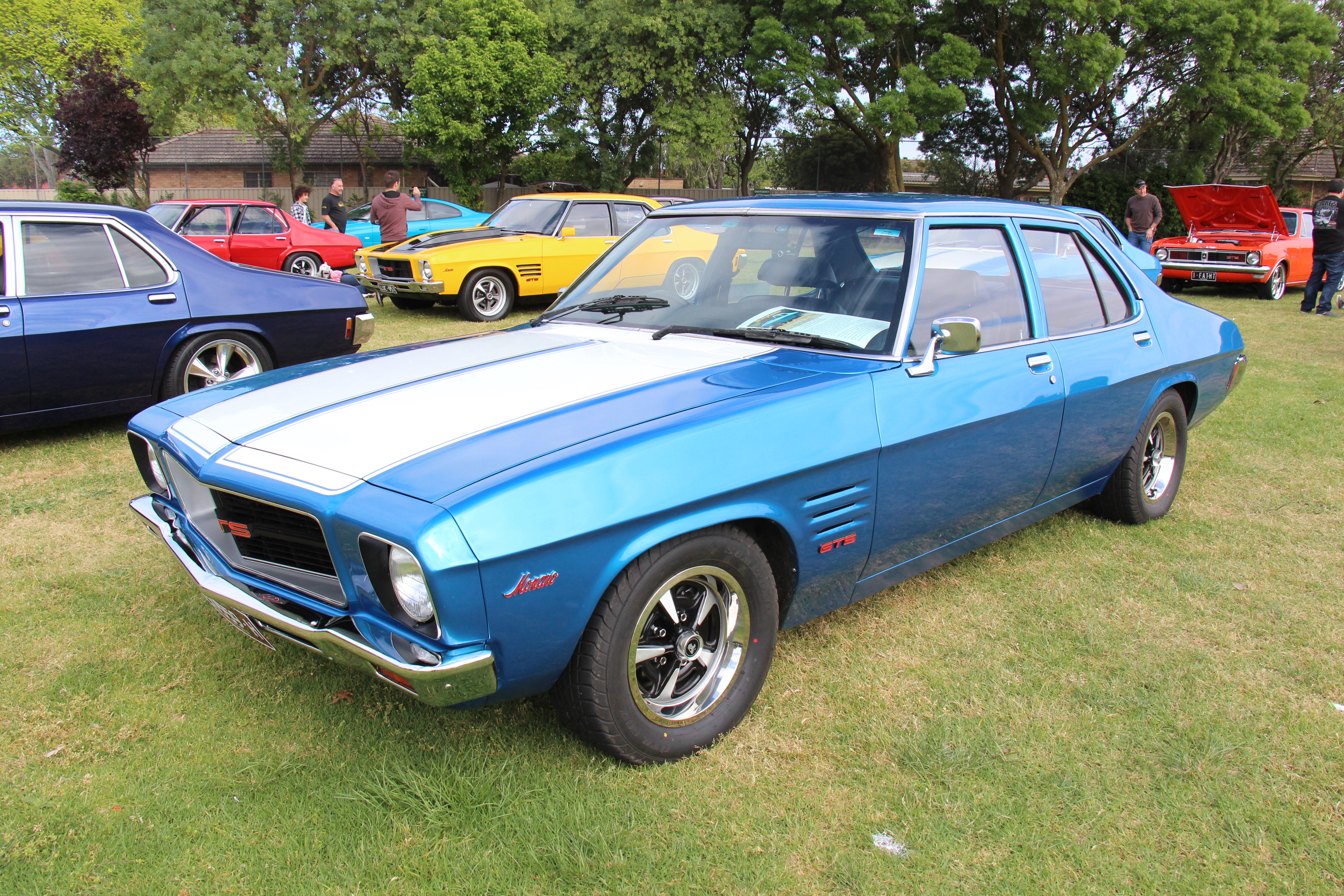
Holden Monaro GTS sedan

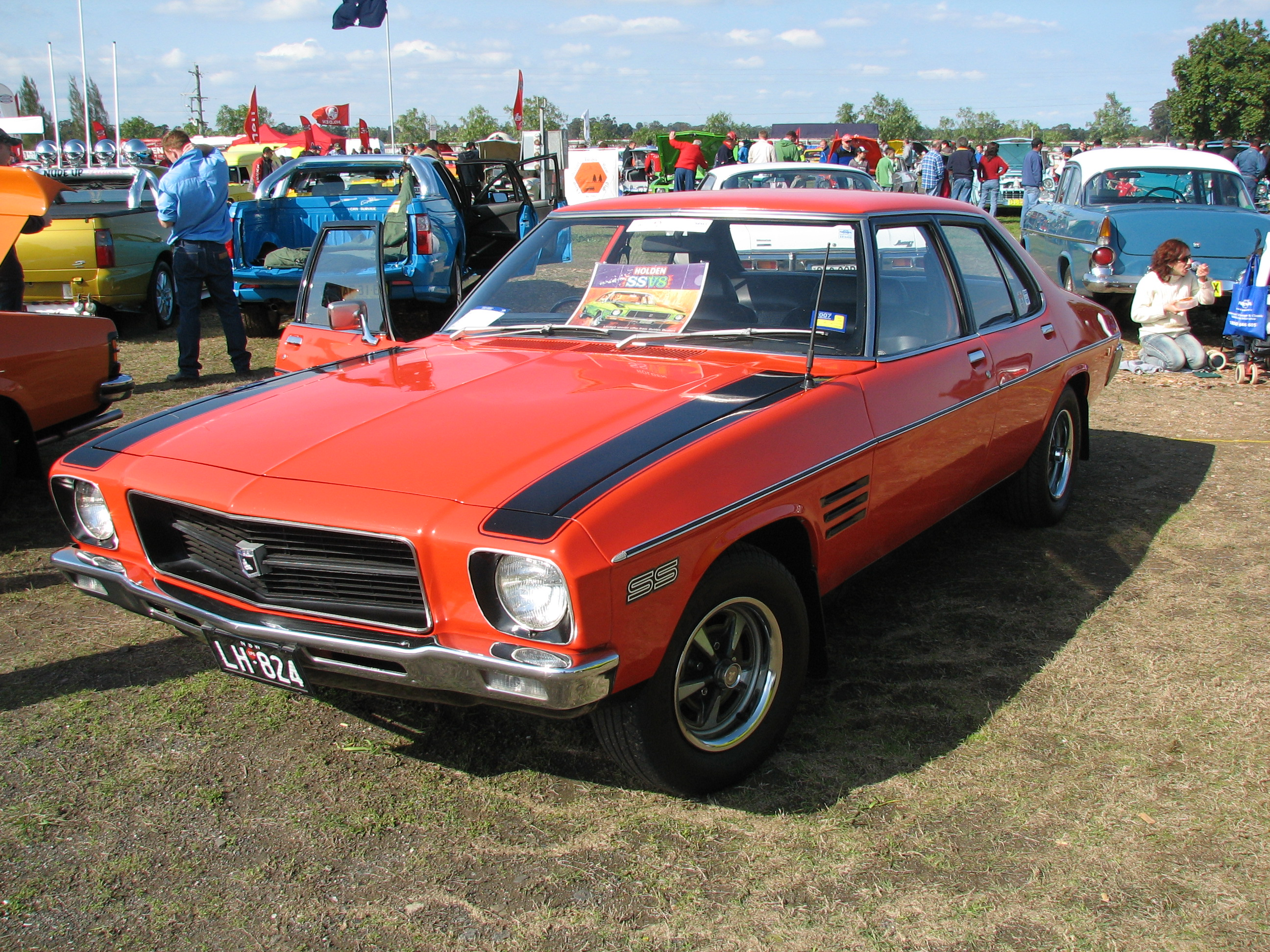
Holden SS sedan

== Engines ==
The two inline six cylinder engines from the HG range were carried over to the HQ, but were enlarged to 173 cu in (2.8 L) and 202 cu in (3.3 L). The 253 cu in (4.1 L) - marketed later as 4.2 liters, 308 cu in (5.0 L) (Holden V8 engines) and 350 cu in (5.7 L) (Chevrolet small-block engine) V8's were also carried over.

HQ power-trains
Engine	Displacement	Compression	Power		Torque		Transmission
Engine	Displacement	Compression	bhp	kW	ft·lb	N·m	Transmission
2.83 L Red I6	173 cu in	Low	112	84	160	220	3-speed manual; 4-speed manual; 3-speed Tri-Matic automatic
2.83 L Red I6	173 cu in	High	118	88	168	228	3-speed manual; 4-speed manual; 3-speed Tri-Matic automatic
3.3 L Red I6	202 cu in	Low	129	96	190	260	3-speed manual; 4-speed manual; 3-speed Tri-Matic automatic
3.3 L Red I6	202 cu in	High	135	101	194	263	3-speed manual; 4-speed manual; 3-speed Tri-Matic automatic
4.1 L Holden V8	253 cu in	Low	174	130	247	335	3-speed manual; 4-speed manual; 3-speed Tri-Matic automatic
4.1 L Holden V8	253 cu in	High	185	138	262	355	3-speed manual; 4-speed manual; 3-speed Tri-Matic automatic
5.0 L Holden V8	308 cu in		240	180	315	427	4-speed manual; 3-speed Tri-Matic automatic
5.7 L Chevrolet V8	350 cu in		275	205	360	490	4-speed manual; 3-speed Turbo-Hydramatic automatic

== Production ==
Production of the HQ range totalled 485,650 vehicles prior to its replacement by the Holden HJ series in October 1974. Holden HQs were produced at Holden's Acacia Ridge, Dandenong, Elizabeth and Pagewood plants.

Engines, transmissions, and final drive assemblies were produced at the engine casting plant at Fishermans Bend, although 350 cu in (5.7 L) engines and its drivetrain components were fully imported from fellow General Motors subsidiary, Chevrolet, in the United States.

Many local automotive component businesses in all these states across Australia supplied the main plants with many other parts, such as wiper arms, glass, carpets, electrical systems, fasteners, and the like.

HQ production in New Zealand was at GMNZ's assembly plant at Trentham, New Zealand using some NZ production components and ran until 1975 to use up HQ parts that weren't used on the following Holden HJ series.

== Specifications ==
=== Belmont ===
The Belmont was the barebones HQ, successor to the Holden Standard, coming with a standard 173 cubic inch Inline 6 and column shift 3 speed manual, The Belmont also featured a unique, more toned down door trim design.

=== Kingswood ===
The Kingswood was a slightly midrange, just like the Special it replaced, with a more stylish interior, featuring armrests as standard, and added exterior chrome.

=== Premier ===
The Premier was the top tier of the mainstream 'Holden' Line throughout the release of the XV8 GTS350 Sedan in 1973, featuring a woodgrain styled interior, full length armrests, a standard center console with bucket seats, and many exterior style accents. The Premier's design language was also carried through to the Monaro LS coúpe.

=== SS (Super Sport) ===
The SS was a limited edition variant of the Belmont V8 Sedan, Option code XV8, Featured a 253 cubic inch Holden V8 as standard, with an optional 308 cubic inch V8 variant optional, mated to an Aussie 4 Speed Gearbox, and 3.36:1 Ratio 10-Bolt Salisbury differential as standard, making the SS a hit among younger power hungry drivers, so much so that a Series II SS was released after the Series I run failed to meet demand, in the end, Holden had produced 2800, The SS also featured a Black Roebuck Vinyl Interior with Houndstooth or Flax-Raydo inserts, Standard arm rests, center console with floor shift, Sport Steering wheel and a full GTS dash cluster.

=== Monaro GTS ===
The GTS was a specification of the HQ Holden Monaro, Based on the Kingswood, decked out with all the bells and whistles, the GTS featured its own stripe style, available in most colours, along with a choice of 253 or 308 Holden V8s, mated to either a 4 Speed Holden manual or 3 speed GM Turbo-Hydramatic 350 automatic, backed by a heavy-duty Salisbury differential, the GTS package featured a full interior with optional houndstooth seat inserts in standard bucket seats, sports steering wheel, center console, tachometer, dual split gauges (pictured) and more.

== South Africa ==
For the South African market, the Holden HQ sedan was marketed as the Chevrolet Kommando, and the HQ utility as the Chevrolet El Camino. The Kommando received only the Chevrolet 4.1-litre six while the Constantia was also offered with the Holden 5.0-litre V8 coupled to an automatic transmission. The El Camino received both of these options as well as a new (to South Africa) 3.3-litre six, only in conjunction with a manual transmission. The HQ One Tonner was sold as the Chevrolet El Toro.

== Motorsport ==
With the introduction of the HQ model, Holden's factory supported production-car racing efforts shifted from the V8 Monaro to the smaller six-cylinder LC Torana. A few Monaro and V8 engined Kingswood cars were built for racing, most notably Malcolm Ramsey's V8 Kingswood. These HQs were never as successful as earlier model Monaros had been or the larger-budget Torana teams or the Ford Falcons and Mustangs they raced against.

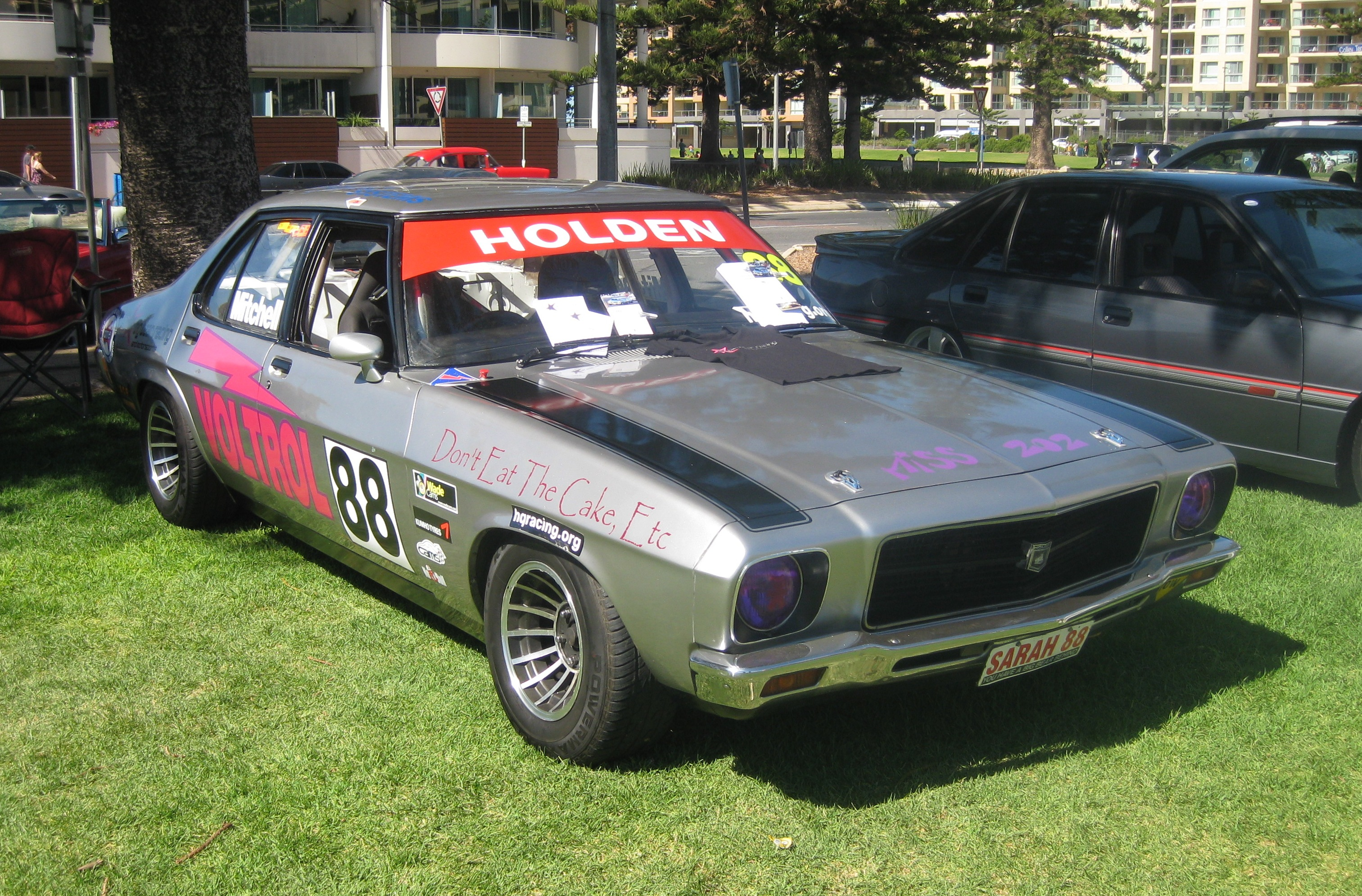
The "Group 3H" Holden (HQ) of Sarah Mitchell

From the late 1980s, the Holden HQ was used in Australia as the basis of a one-make racing category with an emphasis on cost. The category began in Tasmania but very quickly expanded to every state and New Zealand to become the entry-level motor racing category nationwide. The cars are built to comply with CAMS Group 3H Technical Regulations. The series is utilises the 202 ci/3300 cc size six-cylinder engine, the largest six-cylinder engine sold in the car, and is limited to four-door sedan bodied cars.

The HQ motor racing category also had an effect on spare parts in wrecking yards around Australia, with parts and body panels becoming scarce as many of the teams would 'raid' the yards for cheap spares. This led to a shortage of spares for the HQ model for anyone who owned a road-going version.

As of 2024, HQ racing events are still held regularly in every Australian state and territory, and a national event is held annually. The organising body is HQ Racing Australia.

== Statesman HQ ==
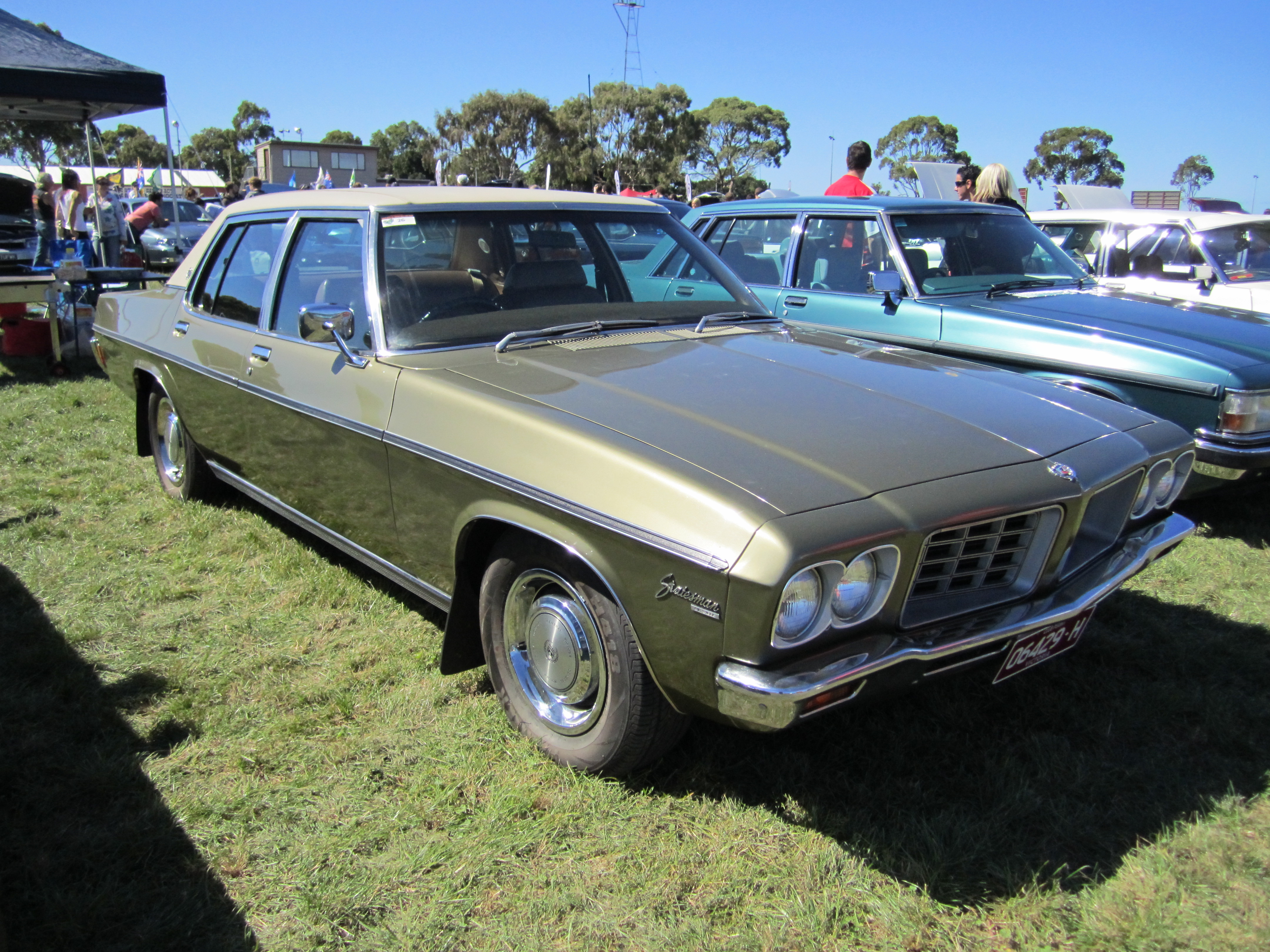
Statesman de Ville (HQ)

The Statesman HQ range of long wheelbase luxury sedans, based on the Holden HQ series, was also released in July 1971. The Statesman models replaced the Holden Brougham from the HG range however they were marketed as Statesmans rather than as Holdens. The Statesman HQ was offered in two models, the base Statesman Custom and the premium Statesman de Ville.
