= Holden Premier =

Car model from Holden

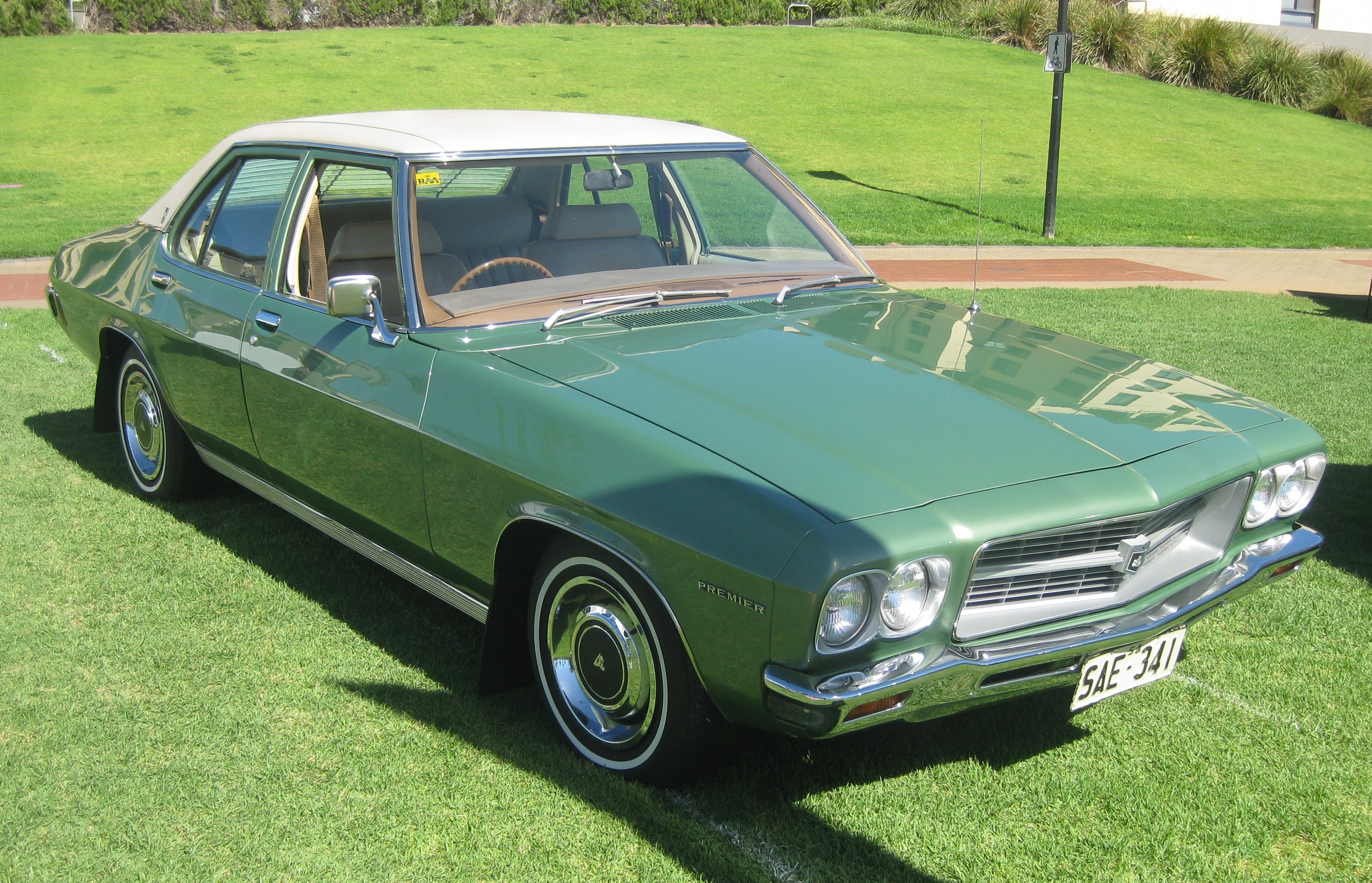
- Holden Premier (HQ)

Overview
- Manufacturer: Holden (General Motors)
- Also called: Mazda Roadpacer (Japan)
- Production: 1962–1980
- Assembly: Australia: Adelaide, South Australia (Elizabeth); Melbourne, Victoria (Dandenong); Sydney, New South Wales (Pagewood); Brisbane, Queensland (Acacia Ridge)

Body and chassis
- Class: Full-size
- Body style: 4-door sedan; 5-door station wagon
- Platform: Holden All-Australian

Powertrain
- Engine: 2.3L GMH '138' I6; 3.0L GMH '186' I6; 3.3L GMH '202' I6; 4.1L GMH '253' V8; 5.0L GMH '308' V8; 1.3L 13B rotary (Japan)
- Transmission: 2 speed Powerglide automatic; 3 speed Hydramatic automatic; 3 speed TriMatic automatic; 3 speed Jatco 3N71B automatic (Japan); 3 speed manual

Chronology
- Successor: Holden Commodore SL/E

The Holden Premier is an automobile that was produced by Holden for Australasia between 1962 and 1980. The Premier was an upmarket version of the:

- Holden Standard/Special: between 1962 and 1968.
- Holden Belmont/Kingswood: between 1968 and 1980. These 1968 onwards Premiers are distinguished from the Belmont and Kingswood by having a quad-headlight grille treatment.

The usual Premier fittings are standard bucket seats, extra exterior trim, carpeted floor mats, armrests, a centre console, automatic transmission, the aforementioned quad-headlights beginning in 1968 and more, or less depending on the series.

With the HD & HR models, an 'X2' option was available, with more detailed instrumentation, alongside a higher output engine. This specification was also available on the Special.

Along with the HQ Premier in 1971, Holden introduced an 'LS' variant of the Monaro coupe, specced almost identically to the Premier range.

Beginning in 1975, the Premier was exported to Japan as a Mazda, where it was fitted with a 13B rotary engine and badged as a Mazda Roadpacer. Roadpacer production ceased in 1977 due to a lack of sales.

The Premier was cancelled in 1980 as Holden rationalised its large range with the introduction of its smaller Commodore model.

== Notes ==
1. using the 1966-1968 HR Premier sedan as a reference.
2. Full length armrests were fitted in HQ-HZ models.
