= Holden Elizabeth Plant =

Former vehicle manufacturing plant in Adelaide, Australia

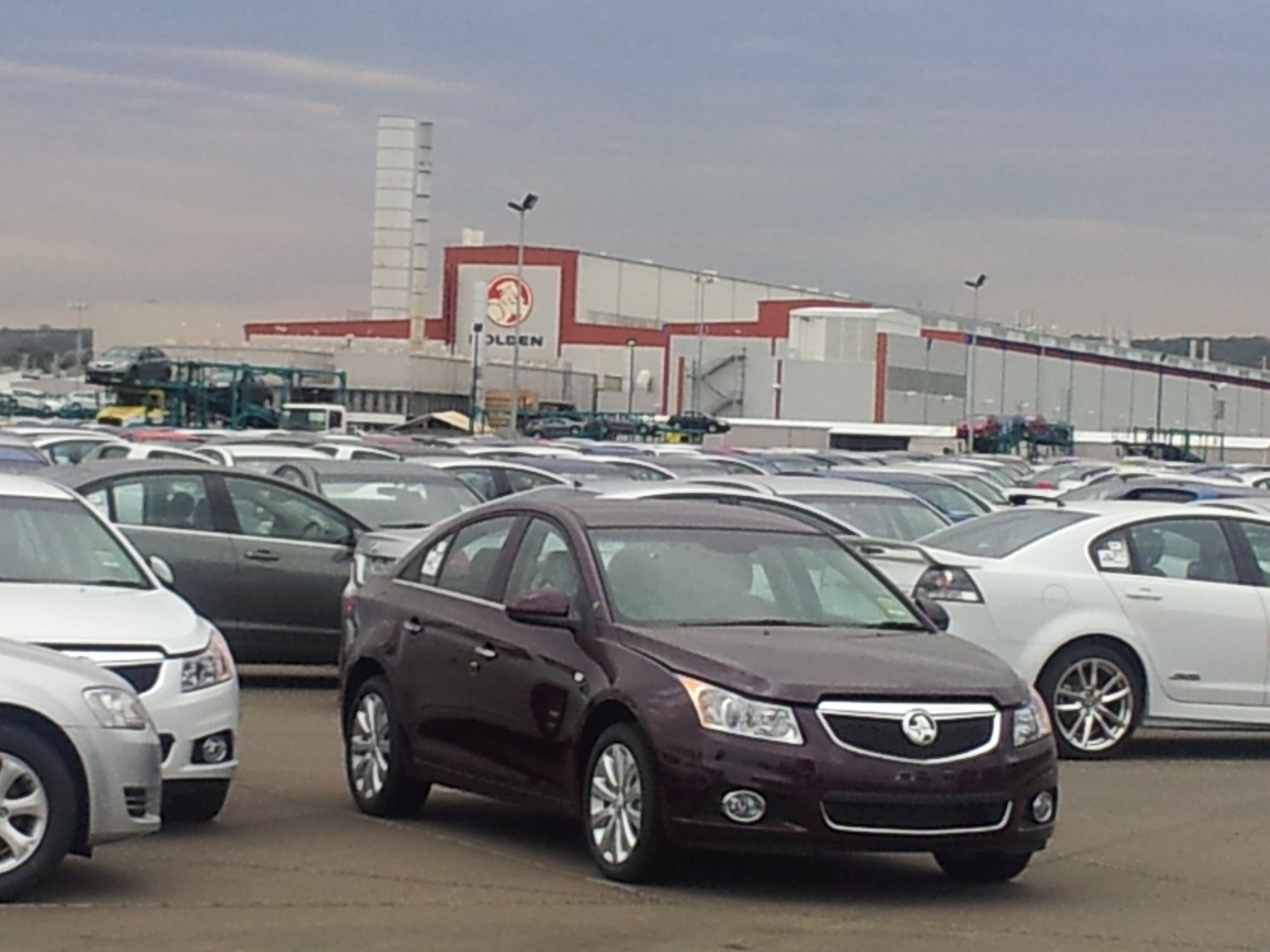
- Southern corner of the Elizabeth Plant
- Built: 1960
- Location: Elizabeth, South Australia
- Industry: Motor vehicle assembly
- Products: Holden (1963–1984); Statesman (1971–1984); Holden Commodore (1979–2017); Holden Caprice (1990–2017); Holden Ute (2000–2017); Holden Monaro (2001–2006); Holden Cruze (2008–2016)
- Area: 303.94 acres (123.00 ha)
- Address: 180 Philip Highway
- Defunct: 20 October 2017

The Holden Elizabeth Plant was a vehicle manufacturing facility in Elizabeth, Adelaide, South Australia, operated by Holden from 1963 until 2017. It succeeded the Woodville Plant and Holden Birkenhead plants as South Australia's main assembly facility.

The plant pressed and assembled bodies with engines from its Port Melbourne Plant in Victoria.

== History ==
The plant hardware plant opened 1960, the body assembly plant in 1962 after the majority of tooling from the Woodville Plant was transferred to Elizabeth. The first vehicle produced at the plant was the Holden EH.

Elizabeth became the last remaining Holden plant in 1989 after the Holden Dandenong Plant closed, after production of the VL Commodore ceased.

In 2006, the plant underwent a redesign known to have cost more than $1 billion, this budget was shared with Holdens development of the General Motors Zeta platform, of which's introduction in the Fourth Generation VE Commodore led to the retooling of the facility.

Australian production of the Cruze ceased in 2016, leaving the Commodore and its ute derivative to be the only vehicles being produced at the plant.

The Elizabeth facility was the last large scale automotive manufacturing facility in Australia to close after the Mitsubishi in 2008, Ford in 2016 and Toyota earlier in 2017.

Holden Special Vehicles, Holden's Melbourne based, factory backed performance subsidiary ordered 300 Holden Commodore sedans months in advance to the plants closure in preparation for Holden's last hurrah, the Gen F2 HSV GTSR W1, surplus LS9 V8s from Chevrolet's C6 ZR1 gives the Holden 474kW of power and 815Nm of torque. These vehicles are now worth upward of $1 million.

The last vehicle, a Holden Commodore SS V Redline rolled off the line on 20 October 2017.

As of 2023, the factory has been converted to a mushroom farm.

== Products ==
- Holden EH-WB (1963–1984)
- Statesman (1971–1984)
- Holden Commodore (1979–2017)
- Holden Statesman/Caprice (1990–2017)
- Holden Ute (2000–2017)
- Holden Monaro (2001–2006)
- Holden Cruze (2011–2016)
