= Mazda Roadpacer =

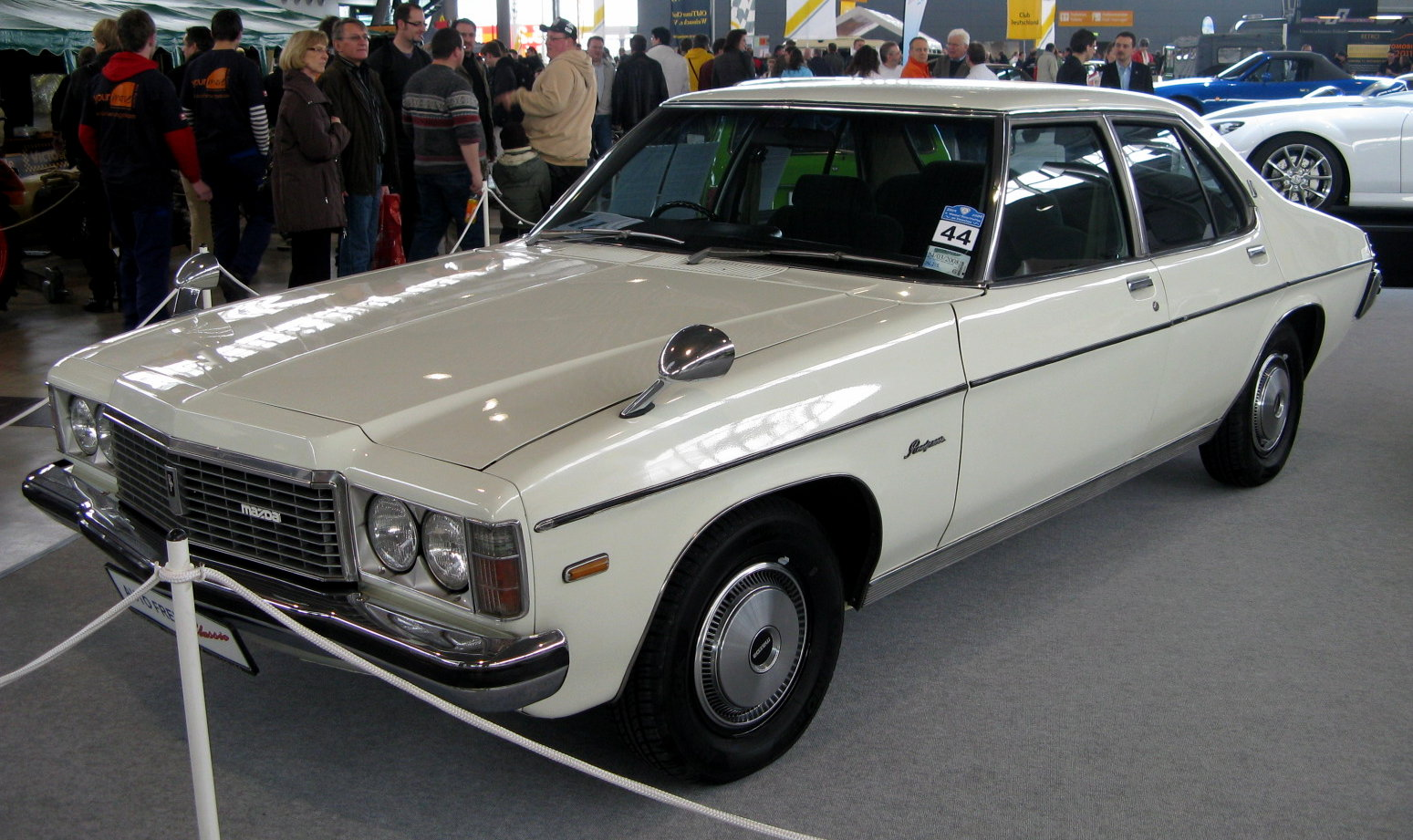

Overview
- Manufacturer: Mazda
- Production: 1975–1977

Body and chassis
- Class: Full-size car
- Body style: 4-door luxury sedan
- Layout: Front-engine, rear-wheel drive
- Platform: Holden HQ platform
- Related: Holden HJ Premier

Powertrain
- Engine: 1.3 L 13B Wankel
- Transmission: 3-speed Jatco 3N71B automatic

Dimensions
- Wheelbase: 2,830 mm (111.4 in)
- Length: 4,850 mm (190.9 in)
- Width: 1,885 mm (74.2 in)
- Height: 1,465 mm (57.7 in)
- Curb weight: 1,575 kg (3,472.3 lb)

The Mazda Roadpacer is a full-size sedan that was assembled by Mazda in Japan between April 1975 and 1977, although the last car was not sold until 1979. It was based on the Australian Holden HJ and HX series Premier. Premiers were shipped to Japan without engines or transmissions, and Mazda fitted a 1.3-liter 13B Wankel engine into the bay. It was the first large Japanese car to meet the 1975 emissions standards, although that was a short-lived distinction because the Nissan President followed suit a month later. In October 1975, the engine was revised to meet the 1976 emissions standards, at which time the car gained the "AP" (Anti-Pollution) moniker. The Roadpacer has the distinction of being the only General Motors product ever fitted for production with a rotary engine.

== Design ==
The engine produced 135 PS (99 kW; 133 hp) but just 186 N⋅m (137 lb⋅ft) of torque, at a peaky 4,000 rpm, meaning the Roadpacer performed rather poorly as it weighed 1,575 kg (3,472 lb). The Roadpacer was introduced to compete with large Japanese flagship sedans Toyota Century, Nissan President, Isuzu Statesman de Ville, and the Mitsubishi Debonair. The Roadpacer's platform was the shorter version of the one used by Isuzu for the Statesman de Ville. Negotiations began in April 1973; the collaboration with Holden was agreed to shortly before Mazda entered into an engineering partnership with Ford. This materialized before the Roadpacer was able to go on sale but did not impact the car's introduction.

The 13B produced less power than the Red series motors that powered the equivalent Holdens, and significantly less torque, meaning performance was restrained with a 165 km/h (103 mph) top speed, poor acceleration and terrible fuel consumption from the overworked engine. Contemporary reports suggest 9 mpg (26 L per 100 km). The three-speed automatic transmission with a steering column shift lever was sourced from Jatco and was shared with the LA series Mazda Luce.

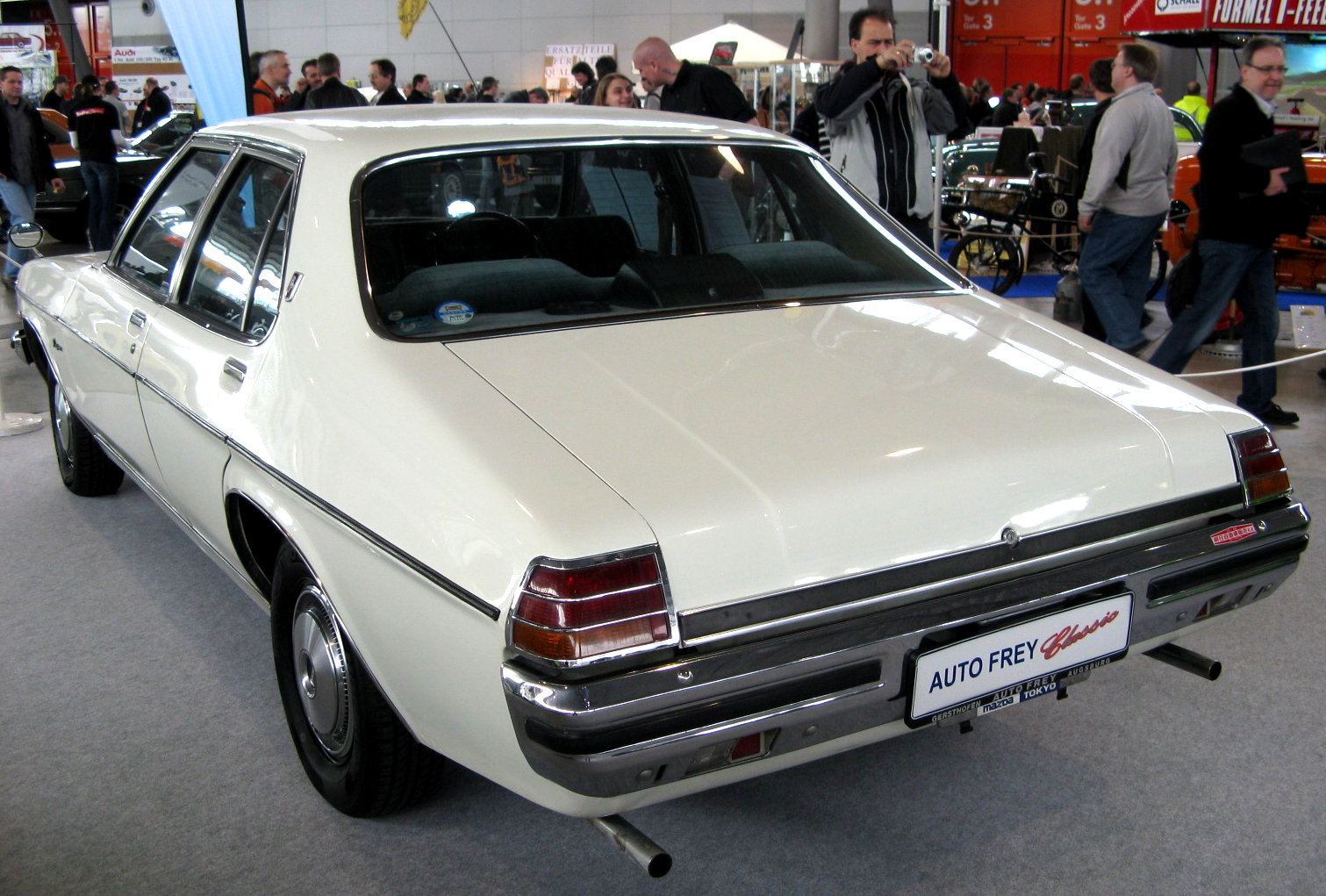
1979 Mazda Roadpacer AP rear view

While the Holden HJ Premier itself was well equipped, Mazda decided to add more. Gadgets of note include a central locking system that activated when the car hit 10 km/h (6.2 mph), a chime system that activated at 90 km/h (56 mph), a dictation system and a stereo able to be controlled from both front and back seats. The interior was offered with a choice of velour upholstered bucket seats and a center console for the front passengers or a split front bench seat, seating either five or six people accordingly. The Roadpacer was built only for the Japanese market, and certain aspects concerning its lack of speed become evident once its realized that urban two-way streets are usually zoned at 40 km/h (25 mph) or less, as mentioned in the article Speed limits in Japan. Another negative quality was that although the car was very large on the outside, the rear seat was not particularly large; Holden offered the longer wheelbase Statesman for this.

The price was also considered high at ¥3.8 million yen (US$13,000) in 1975 ($77,783 in 2025 dollars). This was about twice the price of a contemporary Mazda Cosmo or Mazda Luce and the installation of numerous luxury amenities would be introduced again in 1990 on the Eunos Cosmo. Originally intended as transport for high-ranking government officials, the car was sold in the wake of the first fuel crisis and was not a commercial success. Production ceased in late 1977 after only 800 units built and 799 cars sold, with sales of leftover stock continuing into 1979. Most were originally sold to government departments and were later crushed, meaning Roadpacers are rare nowadays; their counterpart model, the Holden Premier is a popular collectors' car in Australia.

One example can be found on display in the Transport World Motor Museum in Invercargill, New Zealand.

Year	Production	sales
1975	491	399
1976	183	240
1977	126	119
1978	–	36
1979	–	5
