= Holden Birkenhead Plant =

Australian vehicle manufacturing factory

- Built: 1926
- Location: Birkenhead, South Australia
- Industry: Motor vehicle assembly
- Owner: Holden
- Defunct: 1965

The Holden Birkenhead Plant was a vehicle assembly facility owned by General Motors Australia, and later Holden in Birkenhead, Adelaide, Australia from 1926 until 1965.

== History ==
General Motors Australia opened the Birkenhead Plant in 1926. The plant closed in 1931 after General Motors Australia merged Holden's Motor Body Builders with staff moving to the Holden Woodville Plant. It reopened in 1938. From 1949 the plant assembled Holden vehicles with bodies built in Woodville and engines delivered from Fishermens Bend in Melbourne. In 1962 vehicle assembly was transferred to the Elizabeth plant. The plant closed in 1965.
