= Holden Fortitude Valley Plant =

Australian vehicle manufacturing factory

- Built: 1927
- Location: Fortitude Valley, Brisbane, Australia
- Industry: Motor vehicle assembly
- Owner: Holden
- Defunct: 1965

The Holden Fortitude Valley Plant was a vehicle manufacturing facility owned by General Motors Australia, and later Holden in Fortitude Valley, Brisbane, Australia that operated from 1927 until 1965.

== History ==
General Motors Australia opened the Fortitude Valley Plant in 1927. It was closed in July 1931 and reopened in 1934. The plant closed in 1965.
