= Holden Woodville Plant =

Automobile manufacturing facility owned by Australian automobile company holden

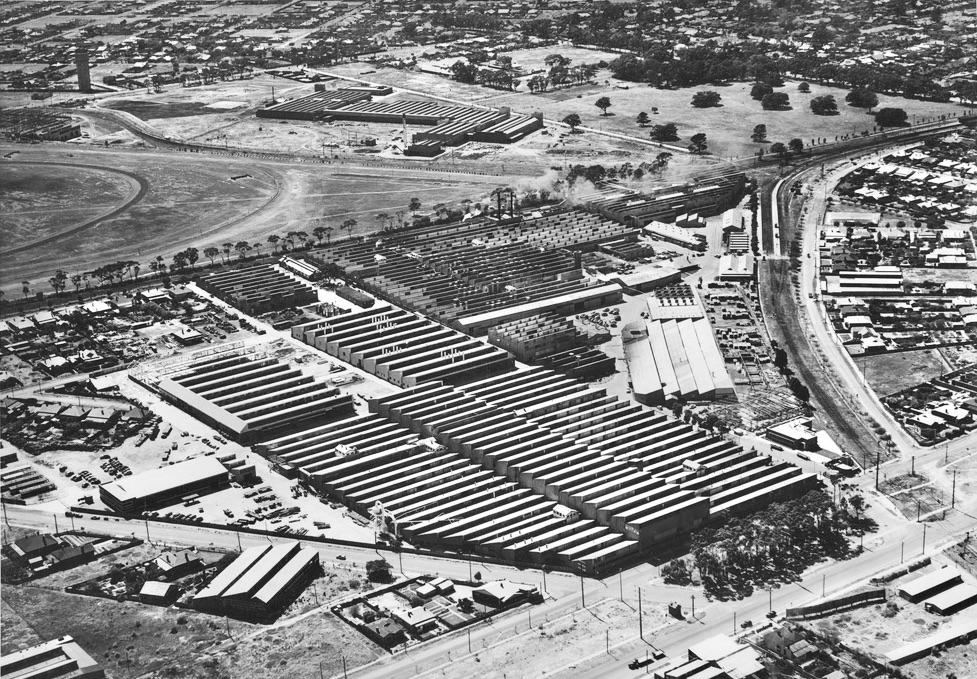
- Aerial view of the plant in 1939
- Built: 1923
- Location: Cheltenham, South Australia
- Industry: Motor vehicle assembly
- Owner: Holden
- Defunct: 1991

The Holden Woodville Plant was a vehicle manufacturing facility owned by Holden in the Adelaide suburb of Cheltenham, Australia.

== Etymology ==
Although the plant is named after the Australian town of Woodville, South Australia, the actual plant was located in the adjacent suburb of Cheltenham.

== History ==
In 1923, Holden's Motor Body Builders established a 23.5-acre (9.5 ha) site known as the Holden Woodville Plant, expanding to 40 acres (16 ha) and employing 5,500 people three years later, which had an impact on all of the surrounding suburbs.

The Woodville plant received its first orders from General Motors. When Holden became the exclusive supplier of car bodies for General Motors, all of them were manufactured at the Woodville plant, from around 1949. The very first Holden car was completed and delivered from the Woodville plant in 1948.

The plant grew and developed largely under the guidance and vision of the Australian motor engineer Laurence Hartnett, who was instrumental in the success of the Australian automobile industry. It was largely due to Hartnett that Holden went from a minor Australian marque to a significant competitor in the global car market.

Between 1959 and 1965, all non-obsolete equipment was moved to Holden's new Elizabeth plant. However Woodville continued to produce replacement parts for discontinued models. The Holden TriMatic transmission was produced at the plant until 1987, although the site was sold off in 1984. Through the 1980s, Holden progressively moved its operations to its Elizabeth plant, leading to the closure of Holden Woodville Plant.

The plant was demolished in 1991, the site is now occupied by delivery centres and hardware stores.

== Achievements ==
During the 1950s, the Woodville plant assembled approximately 10 per cent of all Holden vehicles assembled in Australia.

Although the Woodville plant was closed along with several other plants such as the Elizabeth manufacturing plant, the plant has lived on in the folklore of Australian industry veterans and in their collective memory.

== See also ==
- List of General Motors factories
- List of former automotive manufacturing plants
