= Holden Pagewood Plant =

Automobile manufacturing facility owned by Australian automobile company Holden

Holden Pagwood Plant
- Built: 1940
- Location: Pagewood, New South Wales
- Industry: Motor vehicle assembly
- Owner: Holden
- Defunct: 1980

The Holden Pagewood Plant was a vehicle manufacturing facility owned by Holden in Pagewood, Sydney that operated from 1940 until 1980.

== History ==
The plant was opened by Holden in 1940. It closed down in 1980. The site was redeveloped as the Westfield Eastgardens shopping centre.
