= Holden Acacia Ridge Plant =

Australian vehicle manufacturing factory

- Built: 1966
- Location: Acacia Ridge, Brisbane, Australia
- Industry: Motor vehicle assembly
- Owner: Holden
- Defunct: 1984

The Holden Acacia Ridge Plant was a vehicle manufacturing facility owned by Holden in Acacia Ridge, Brisbane, Australia that operated from 1966 until 1984.

== History ==
In 1966 Holden opened the Holden Acacia Ridge plant, located in Acacia Ridge, Queensland replacing a facility in Strathpine. The plant closed in 1984.

It was the only facility to produce the first-generation Holden Gemini.
