= Holden Dandenong Plant =

Australian vehicle manufacturing factory

- Built: 1956
- Location: Dandenong, Victoria, Australia
- Industry: Motor vehicle assembly
- Owner: Holden
- Defunct: 1988

The Holden Dandenong Plant was a vehicle manufacturing facility owned by Holden in Dandenong, Melbourne, Australia.

== History ==
In 1951, Holden bought 153 acres (62 ha) of land in Dandenong, Melbourne and opened the Holden Dandenong Plant in 1956. The plant closed in 1988. Starting in 1989, the Toyota Corolla and Holden Nova (a rebadged Corolla) were built at the Dandenong plant until 1994, when production moved to the Toyota Australia Altona Plant.
