= T33 =

T33 or T-33 may refer to:

== Automobiles ==
- Alfa Romeo Tipo 33, an Italian racing car
- Bestune T33, a Chinese SUV
- Cooper T33, a British sports car

== Aviation ==
- Canadair T-33, a Canadian jet trainer
- Flader T33, an American turbojet engine
- Lockheed T-33, an American jet trainer

== Other uses ==
- T33 (classification), a disability sport classification
- German torpedo boat T33
- Kire-Uriwari Station, Osaka, Japan
- London Buses route T33
- Soviet minesweeper T-33
- T-37A tank, a Soviet light tank
