= 1965 Lowood 4 Hour =

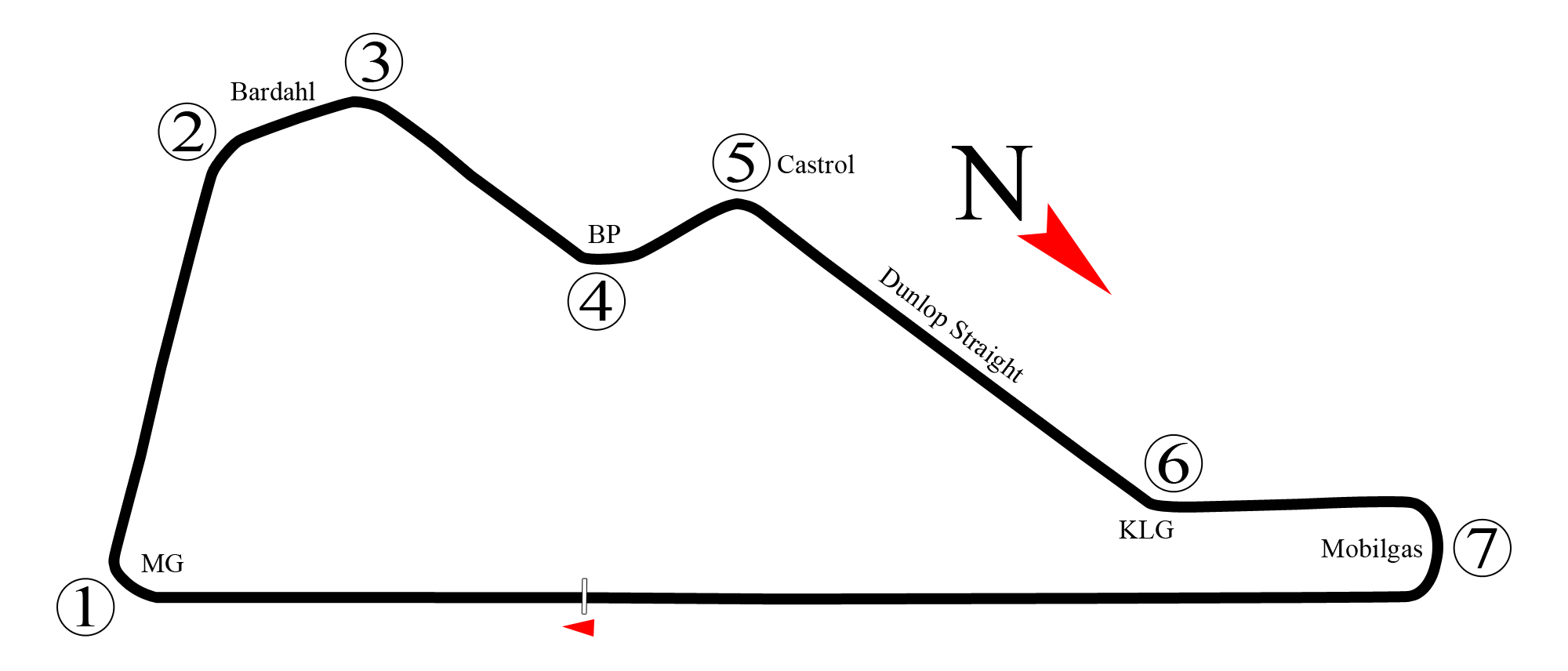
Layout of the Lowood Airfield Circuit (1946–1966)

The 1965 Lowood 4 Hour was an endurance motor race held at the Lowood circuit in Queensland, Australia on 28 March 1965. The race, which was organised by the Queensland Racing Drivers Club, was the second annual Lowood 4 Hour. It was open to Production Touring Cars which had been manufactured after 28 March 1961, 100 examples of which had been registered in Australia by the closing date for entries. The field was divided into four classes according to the retail price of each vehicle. There were 33 starters in the event.

Although the Morris Cooper S driven by John Harvey and Brian Foley took "line honours", outright results were not officially recognised and official results were only issued for class placings.

== Results ==
Position	Drivers	No.	Car	Entrant	Laps
Class A : Cars up to £900
1	Brian Flynn; John Route		Ford Cortina 1200	Barrie Broomhall Motors	91
2	Lionel Ayers; Warren Blomfield	11	Hillman Imp	Stradbroke Motors	90
3	Geoff Shoesmith; Anthony Robards	?	Vauxhall Viva		
4	Des West; Noel Eades		Vauxhall Viva	Des West	
5	Roy Sawyer; Gordon Ferrar		Ford Cortina 1200	Coolangatta Motors	
6	Bob Williamson; Peter Harden		Hillman Imp		
7	Don Mudd; Alan Kavanagh		Vauxhall Viva		
8	Chris McSorley; R Skelton		Hillman Imp		
Class B : £901 to £1,000
1	Marie Nolan; Denis Geary		Ford Cortina 1500	John Timmins Autos	95
2	Des Kelly; Leigh Mitchell		Toyota Corona	Rockhampton Car Sales	94
3	Steve Harvey; Bill Stanley		Morris Cooper	White Nicholson Racing Team	94
4	Andrew Davis; Paul Mander		Morris Cooper	Andrew Davis	93
5	Arthur Treloar; Paul Donnelly		Isuzu Bellett	Arthur Treloar	93
6	Craig Bell; Geoff Bernhagen		Isuzu Bellett	Craig Bell Motor Center	93
7	Barry Tapsall; Albert Ward		Renault R8		
8	Keith Shaw; Ken Peters	61	Morris Cooper		
9	Kevin Johns; Graham Lax		Ford Cortina 1500		
10	Max Volkers; Glyn Scott		Ford Cortina 1500	Ford Motor Company	
11	Bob Bailey; Jim Reuter	29	Isuzu Bellett		
DNF	Barry Nixon-Smith; Jack Hughes		Morris Cooper		
Class C : £1,001 to £1,200
1	Harry Firth; John Raeburn	36	Ford Cortina GT	Ford Motor Company	101
2	Barry Arentz; Brian Michelmore		Ford Cortina GT	Barry Arentz	94
3	Evan Thomas; Eric Wedmaier		Holden EH 179	J Thomas & Sons	93
4	Don Smith; Bruce Stewart		Holden HD X2		59
5	Les Daly; Ron Lang		Ford Cortina GT		
Class D : £1,201 to £2,000
1	John Harvey; Brian Foley	40	Morris Cooper S	R C Phillips	102
2	Barry Gibson; Tony Basile		Studebaker Daytona	Barry Gibson	100
3	Ron O'Neill; Graham Perry	51	Ford Cortina Lotus	Ron O'Neil's Parking Station	97
4	Geoff Sakzewski; Terry Kratzmann		Fiat 1500	Tony Basile Motors	92
5	Greg Watkins; Dave Harding		Fiat 1500		
6	Bill Burns; Brian Lawler		Fiat 2300		
7	Adrian Yannuccelli; John Gillmeister		Studebaker Lark		
DNF	Paul Zacka; Eric Pryor		Holden HD X2		

Note: Car 51 was eligible for the race under a Lowood pro-rata clause.
