= J55 =

J55 may refer to:

- Flader J55, a tubojet engine
- HMIS Malwa (J55), a minesweeper of the Royal Indian Navy
- Infiniti QX50 (J55), a Japanese SUV
- Parabiaugmented hexagonal prism
