= Lowood Airfield Circuit =

Motorsport track in Queensland, Australia

Lowood Circuit
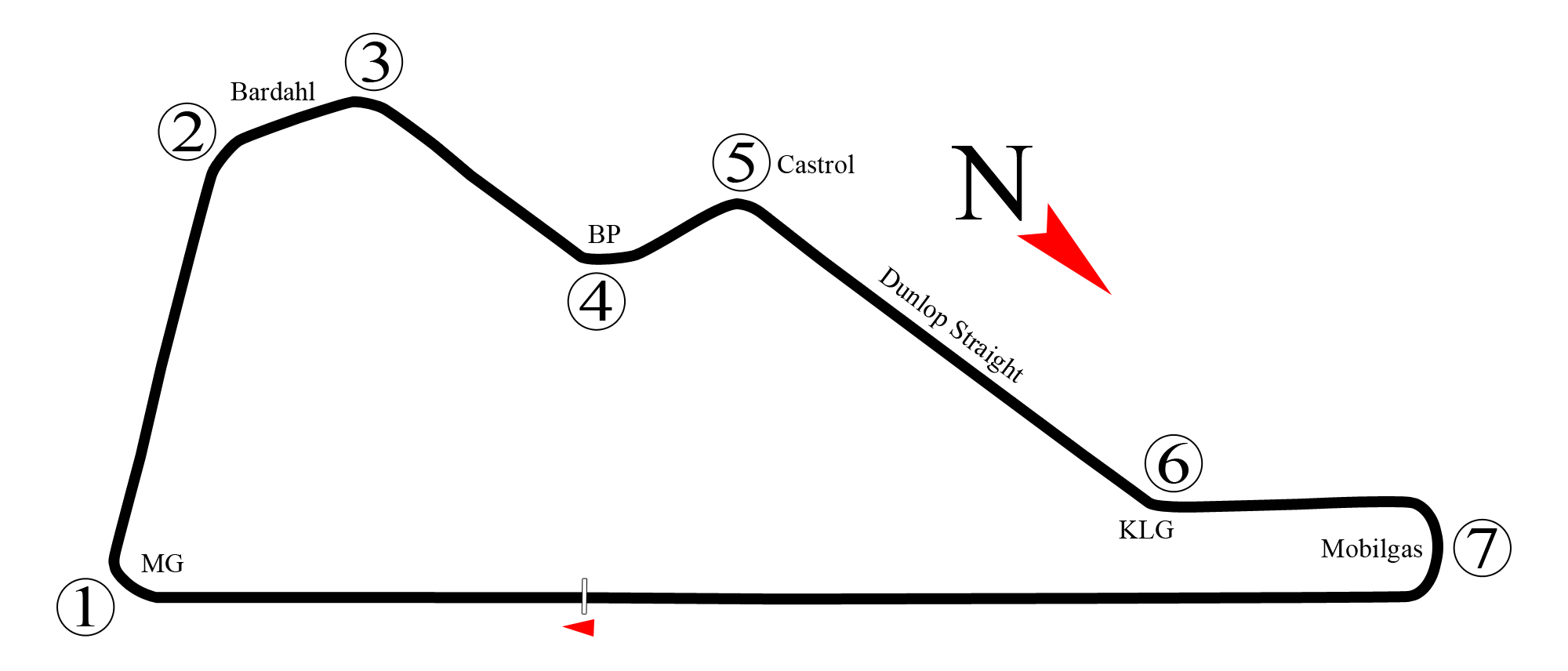
- Grand Prix Circuit (1946–1966)
- Location: Tarampa, Queensland
- Coordinates: 27°27′40″S 152°29′10″E
- Opened: June 1946; 80 years ago
- Closed: November 1966; 59 years ago
- Major events: Australian Grand Prix (1960); Australian Touring Car Championship (1961); Australian Drivers' Championship (1957–1962); Lowood 4 Hour (1964–1966); Australian Tourist Trophy (1959, 1963); Australian Formula 2 (1964)

Grand Prix Circuit (1946–1966)
- Length: 4.54 km (2.82 mi)
- Turns: 7
- Race lap record: 1:44.0 ( (Australia) Lex Davison, Aston Martin DBR4/300, 1960, F1)

The Lowood Airfield Circuit was a motor racing venue in Queensland, Australia. The circuit, which was used from 1946 to 1966, was located at the former wartime Lowood Aerodrome site at Mount Tarampa, near Lowood, 72 km (45 mi) west of the state capital Brisbane. It utilised the airfield's runway for its 1.9 km (1.2 mi) long 200 m (220 yd) wide main straight and also used various taxiways and tarmac from the old hangar area. Lap distance was 4.54 km (2.82 mi).

The circuit was first used in June 1946 for the running of the Queensland Grand Prix, however it hosted only occasional meetings between then and 1956. In that year the Queensland Racing Drivers' Club took over the site, hosting their first meeting there in November and subsequently developing the circuit into Queensland's premier motor racing venue. The circuit was closed in November 1966.

== Australian Drivers Championship ==
Rounds of the Australian Drivers' Championship were held at Lowood each year from 1957 to 1962.

- 1957 Round 5 – Lex Davison – Ferrari 625/750
- 1957 Round 6 – Stan Jones – Maserati 250F
- 1958 Round 5 – Alec Mildren – Cooper Climax
- 1958 Round 6 – Alec Mildren – Cooper Climax
- 1959 Round 6 – Alec Mildren – Cooper Climax
- 1959 Round 7 – Alec Mildren – Cooper Climax
- 1960 Round 3 – Alec Mildren – Cooper Maserati
- 1960 Round 4 – Alec Mildren – Cooper Maserati
- 1961 Round 3 – Bill Patterson – Cooper Climax
- 1962 Round 3 – Greg Cusack – Cooper Climax

== Australian Tourist Trophy ==
Lowood twice hosted the nation's premier sports car race, the Australian Tourist Trophy.

- 1959 Australian Tourist Trophy – Ron Phillips – Cooper T33
- 1963 Australian Tourist Trophy – Ian Geoghegan – Lotus 23

== Australian Grand Prix ==
Lowood hosted the nation's premier motor racing event of 1960 the Australian Grand Prix. It was won by Alec Mildren driving a Cooper T51.

== Australian Touring Car Championship ==
The Lowood circuit was the host track of the second Australian Touring Car Championship, in 1961. The race was won by Bill Pitt, driving a Jaguar 3.4.

== Lowood 4 Hour ==
Three 4 Hour races for production sedans were held at the Lowood circuit during the mid sixties. Although the emphasis was on class victories, the entries credited with line honours for covering the greatest distance were:

- 1964 Lowood 4 Hour – Harry Firth & John Raeburn – Ford Cortina GT Mk 1
- 1965 Lowood 4 Hour – John Harvey & Brian Foley – Morris Cooper S
- 1966 Lowood 4 Hour – David McKay & Bill Orr – Volvo 122S

== Australian Formula 2 Championship ==
The inaugural Australian Formula 2 Championship was staged at the Lowood circuit in June 1964 and was won by Greg Cusack driving an Elfin Ford.
