= 1966 Lowood 4 Hour =

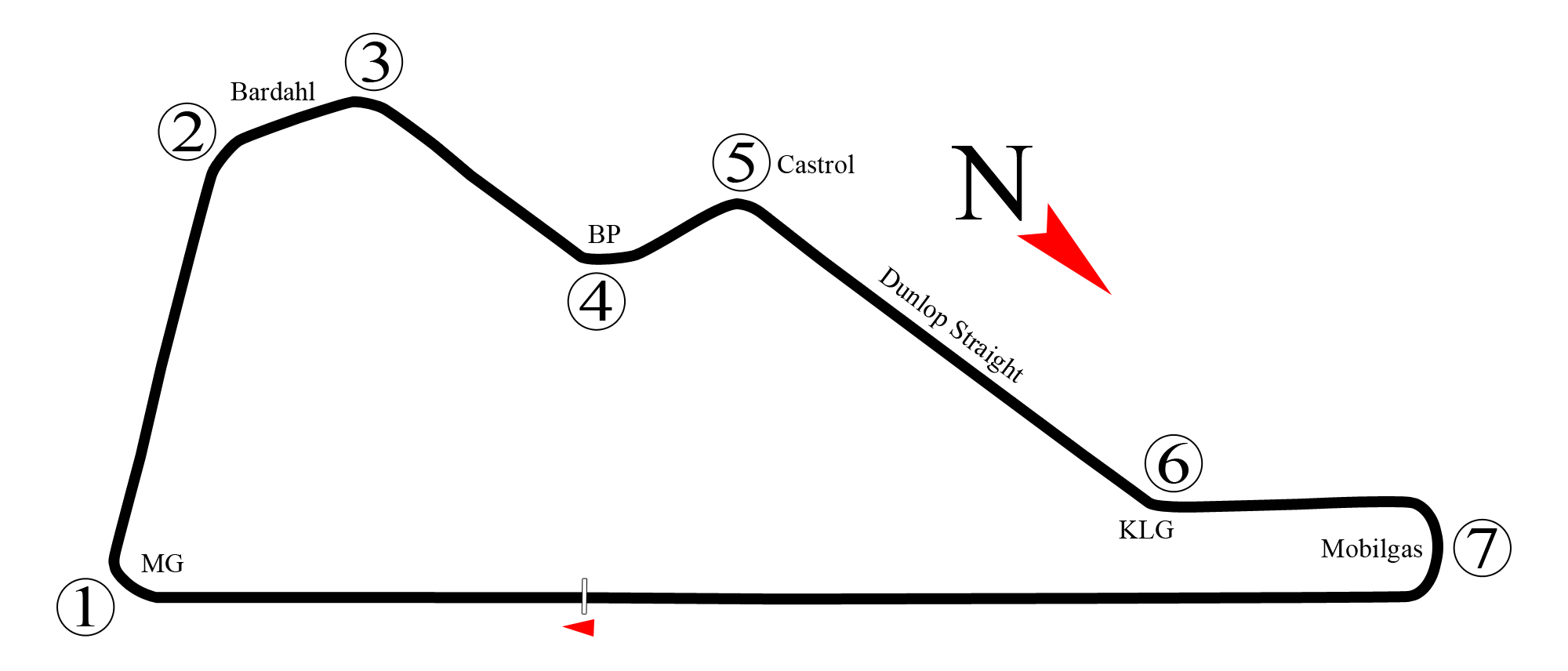
Layout of the Lowood Airfield Circuit (1946-1966)

The 1966 Lowood 4 Hour was an endurance race for production sedans held at the Lowood circuit in Queensland, Australia on 27 March 1966. The race, which was organised by the Queensland Racing Drivers Club, was the third annual Lowood 4 Hour. It was open to cars priced under $6000 in Australia, provided that 100 examples of the model had been manufactured.

The 34 starters competed in four classes based on vehicle retail price with an additional class for cars with automatic transmission. Class winning cars were Morris Mini Deluxe, Morris Cooper, Ford Cortina GT500, Volvo 122S and Holden HD X2 179. Officially, only class placings were recognised but the unofficial "line honours" winner was the Scuderia Veloce entered Volvo 122S driven by David McKay and Bill Orr. Initial reports had the Firth / Seton Ford Cortina GT500 listed as taking line honours, but this was later corrected.

== Results ==
Position	Drivers	No.	Car	Entrant	Laps
	Class A : Up to $1720				
1	M Schneider, M Brewster		Morris Mini Deluxe	Marque Motors	93
2	Joe Camilleri, L Gould		Morris Mini Deluxe	J Camilleri	91
3	H Beiers, I Beiers		Morris Mini Deluxe	H&I Beiers	90
4	J Humphrey, J Osborne		Morris Mini Deluxe	Humphreys Golden Fleece Service Station	90
5	Harrison		Ford Anglia		
?	Williams		Fiat 850S		
DNF	Kennedy, Perrett		Morris Mini Deluxe		
DNF	Gary Shoesmith, Wolders		Vauxhall Viva		76
	Class B : $1721 – $2200				
1	Bill Stanley, Digby Cooke		Morris Cooper	Marque Motors	99
2	Max Volkers, Graeme Perry		Ford Cortina 1500	R O'Neill's Parking Station	98
3	B Tapsall, B Gates		Datsun Bluebird SS	B Tapsall	98
4	Ron Park, Paul Zacka	31	Holden EH	R O'Neill's Parking Station	97
?	Brown	37	Datsun Bluebird SS	Scuderia Veloce	
?	Hughes		Morris Cooper		
?	Bailey		Isuzu Bellett		
?	Stewart		Isuzu Bellett		
DNF	Woodford, Dellit		Ford Cortina		
DNF	Lionel Ayers, Warren Blomfield		Toyota Corona	Swift Service Station	44
DNF	Hodgson, Reynolds		Ford Cortina	Griffith Brake Service	
DNF	Grimson & Mitchell		Ford Cortina		
	Class C : $2201 - $3200				
1	Harry Firth, Barry Seton	51	Ford Cortina GT500	Ford Motor Company	106
2	Bob Holden, Ron Haylen	58	Morris Cooper S	B.M.C. (Australia)	105
3	Don Holland, L Stewart		Morris Cooper S	Don Holland Motors	103
4	P Brown, J Sediatis		Ford Cortina GT500	P Brown	102
5	R Page, B Tatham		Prince Skyline GT	R Page	102
6	M Bailey, J Hicks		Prince Skyline GT	M Bailey	100
?			Morris Cooper S		
?			Morris Cooper S		
DNF	Sachs		Chrysler Valiant		
DNF	John French		Morris Cooper S		92
DNF	Beasley, Standfast	62	Morris Cooper S		78
	Class D : $3201 – $6000				
1	David McKay, Bill Orr	70	Volvo 122S	Scuderia Veloce	107
2	Ron O'Neill, L Daly		Ford Cortina Lotus		102
	Class E : Automatics only, unlimited price				
1	I Knowles, Glyn Scott		Holden HD X2 179	M McDonald	88
DNS	Glyn Scott		Ford Fairmont	Ford Motor Company	-
