= 1964 Australian Formula 2 Championship =

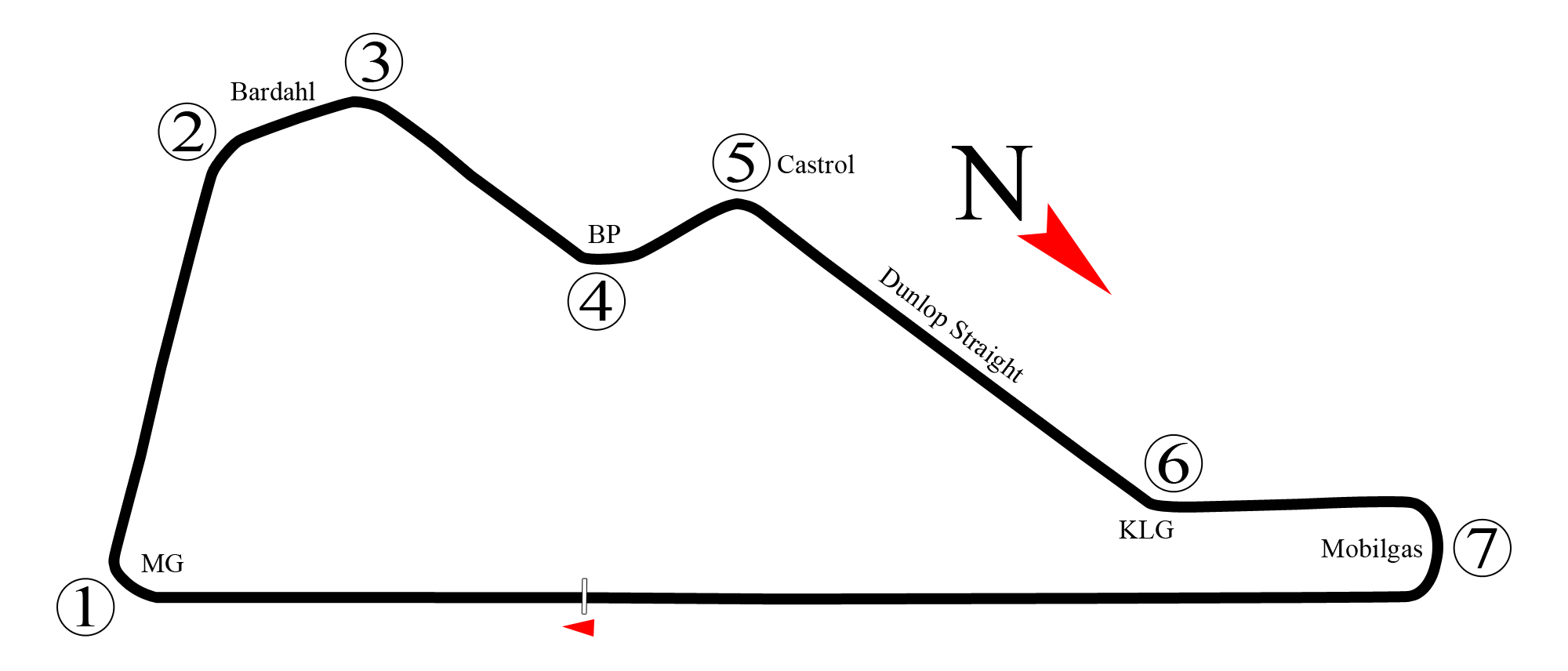
Layout of the Lowood Airfield Circuit (1946-1966)

The 1964 Australian Formula 2 Championship was a CAMS sanctioned Australian motor racing title for racing cars complying with Australian Formula 2. The championship was contested over a single 30 lap, 90 mile race staged at the Lowood circuit in Queensland, Australia on 14 June 1964. It was the first Australian Formula 2 Championship.

The championship was won by Greg Cusack driving an Elfin FJ Ford Cosworth

== Championship results ==
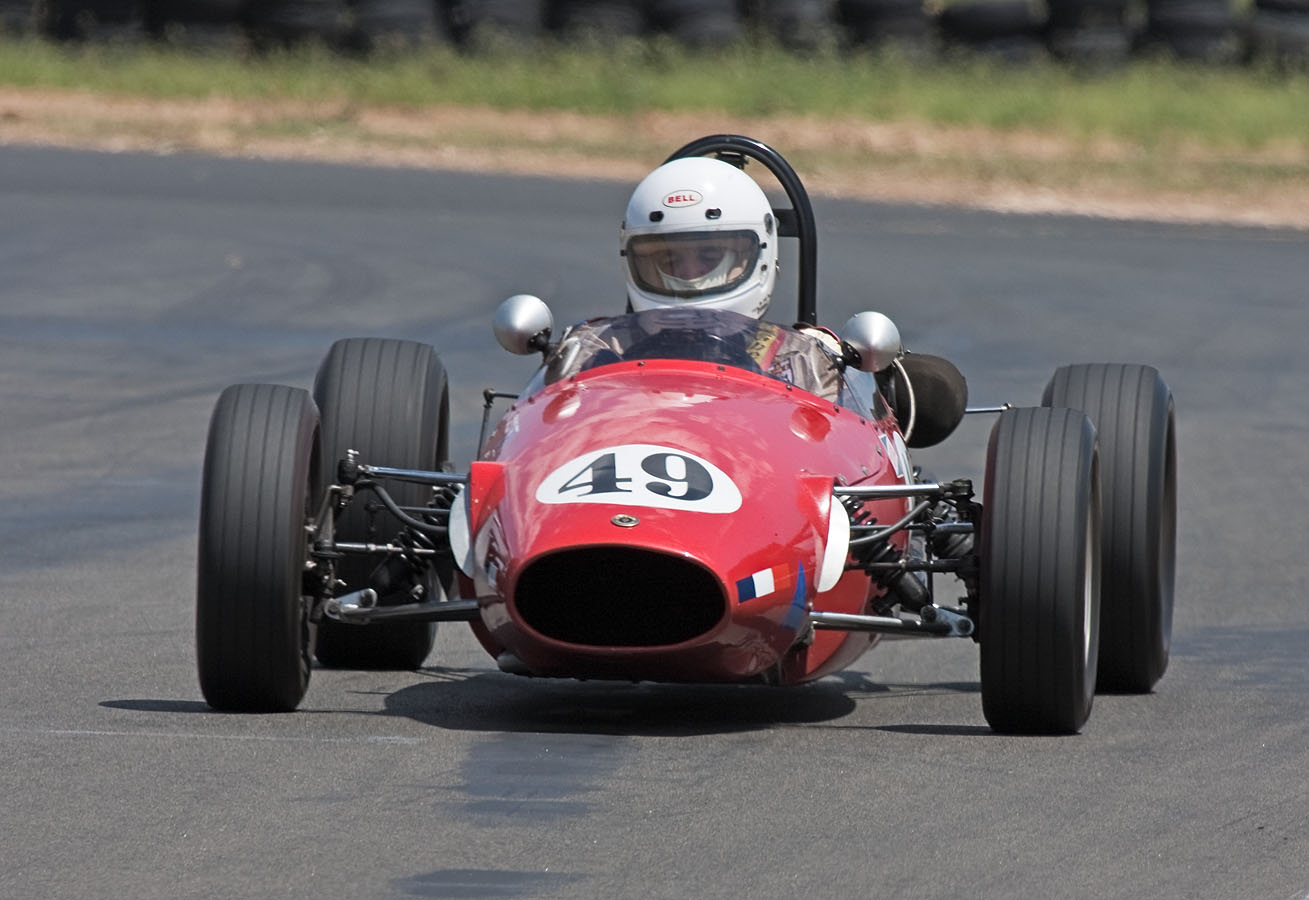
Greg Cusack won the championship driving an Elfin FJ similar to the example pictured above

Position	Driver	No.	Car	Entrant	Laps
1	Greg Cusack		Elfin FJ Ford Cosworth		30
2	David Walker		Brabham		
3	J Hunnam		Elfin		
Finished	W Bloomfield		MRC Lotus		
?	Keith Malcolm		Lotus 20		
DNF	Lionel Ayers		MRC Lotus		29
DNF	Leo Geoghegan		Lotus 27		27

=== Notes ===
- Nominations: 10
- Starters: 7
- Pole position: Leo Geoghegan, 1:49.2
- Fastest lap: Leo Geoghegan, 1:47 (new lap record)
