= Holden HR =

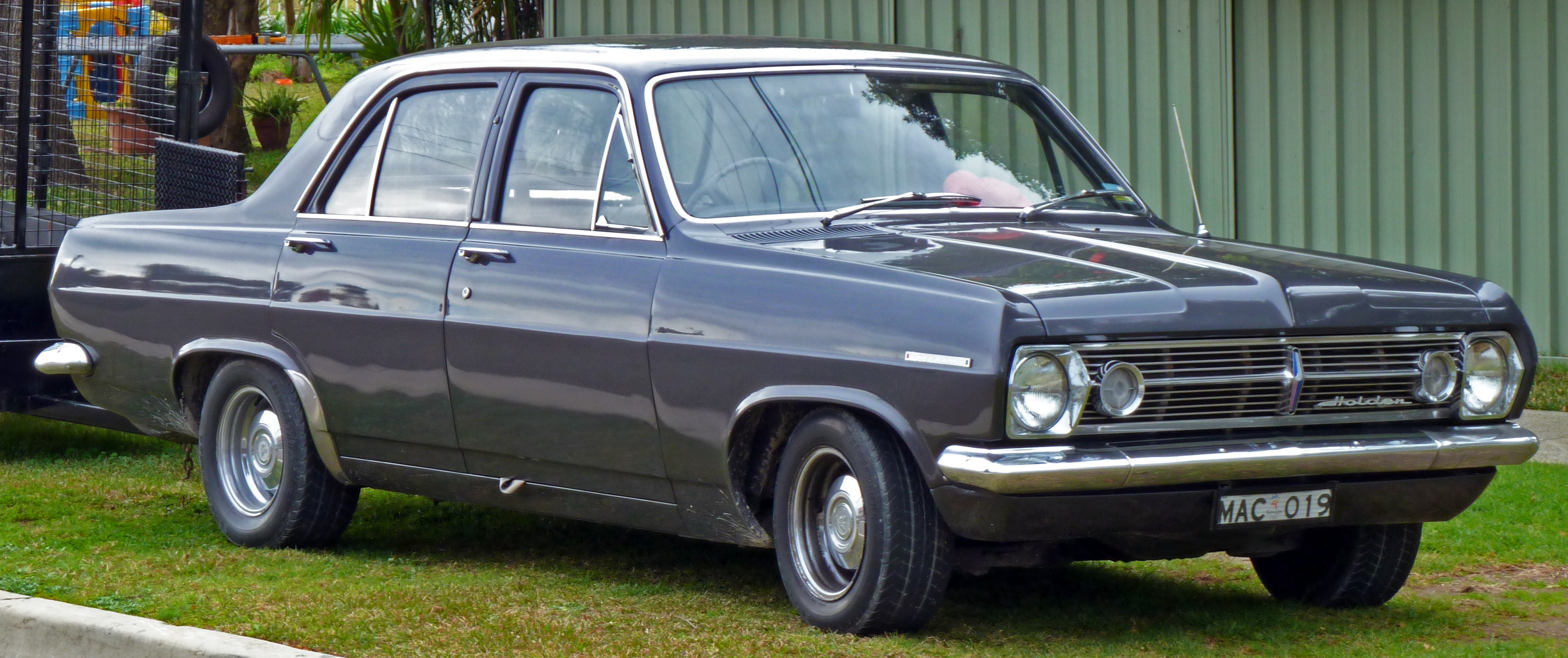
- 1966 Holden Special Sedan

Overview
- Manufacturer: Holden
- Also called: Holden Standard; Holden Special; Holden Premier; Holden Utility; Holden Panel Van
- Production: April 1966 – January 1968
- Designer: Joe Schemansky

Body and chassis
- Class: Mid-size
- Body style: 4-door sedan 5-door station wagon 2-door coupé utility 2-door panel van
- Layout: FR layout

Powertrain
- Engine: 2.6 L GMH 161' I6; 3.0 L GMH 186/186X2/186S I6; 3.2 L Chevrolet 194 I6 (ZA); 3.8 L Chevrolet 230 I6 (ZA)
- Transmission: 3-speed manual 4-speed manual 2-speed Powerglide automatic

Dimensions
- Wheelbase: 106.0 inches (2692mm)
- Length: Sedan: 181.1 inches (4600mm); Wagon: 180.2 inches (4577mm)
- Width: 70 inches (1778mm)
- Height: Sedan: 58.3 inches (1481mm); Wagon: 58.5 inches (1486mm)
- Kerb weight: Standard Sedan: 2601lb (1178kg)

Chronology
- Predecessor: Holden HD
- Successor: Holden HK

The Holden HR is an automobile manufactured by Holden in Australia from April 1966 until January 1968.

== Introduction ==
The Holden HR range was released in April 1966, replacing the Holden HD series which had been in production since 1965. In addition to a revised grille, the HR featured a reworked roofline and larger rear window (on the sedans), revised rear lights (on sedans and wagons) and changes to almost all exterior body panels. Other changes included revised ball joint front suspension, widened track, improved interior trim and woodgrain interior finish for the Premier models. Six months after the launch of the HR, all models were given a safety upgrade with the addition of front safety belts, windscreen washers, reversing lights, padded sun visors and a shatterproof interior rearview mirror.

== Model range ==
The Holden HR passenger vehicle range offered four-door sedan and five-door station wagon body styles in three trim levels with the six models marketed as follows:

- Holden Standard Sedan (HR 215)
- Holden Standard Station Sedan (HR 219)
- Holden Special Sedan (HR 225)
- Holden Special Station Sedan (HR 229)
- Holden Premier Sedan (HR 235)
- Holden Premier Station Sedan (HR 239)

The HR commercial vehicle range was offered in two-door coupe utility and two-door panel van variants, marketed as follows:

- Holden Utility (HR 2106)
- Holden Panel Van (HR 2104)
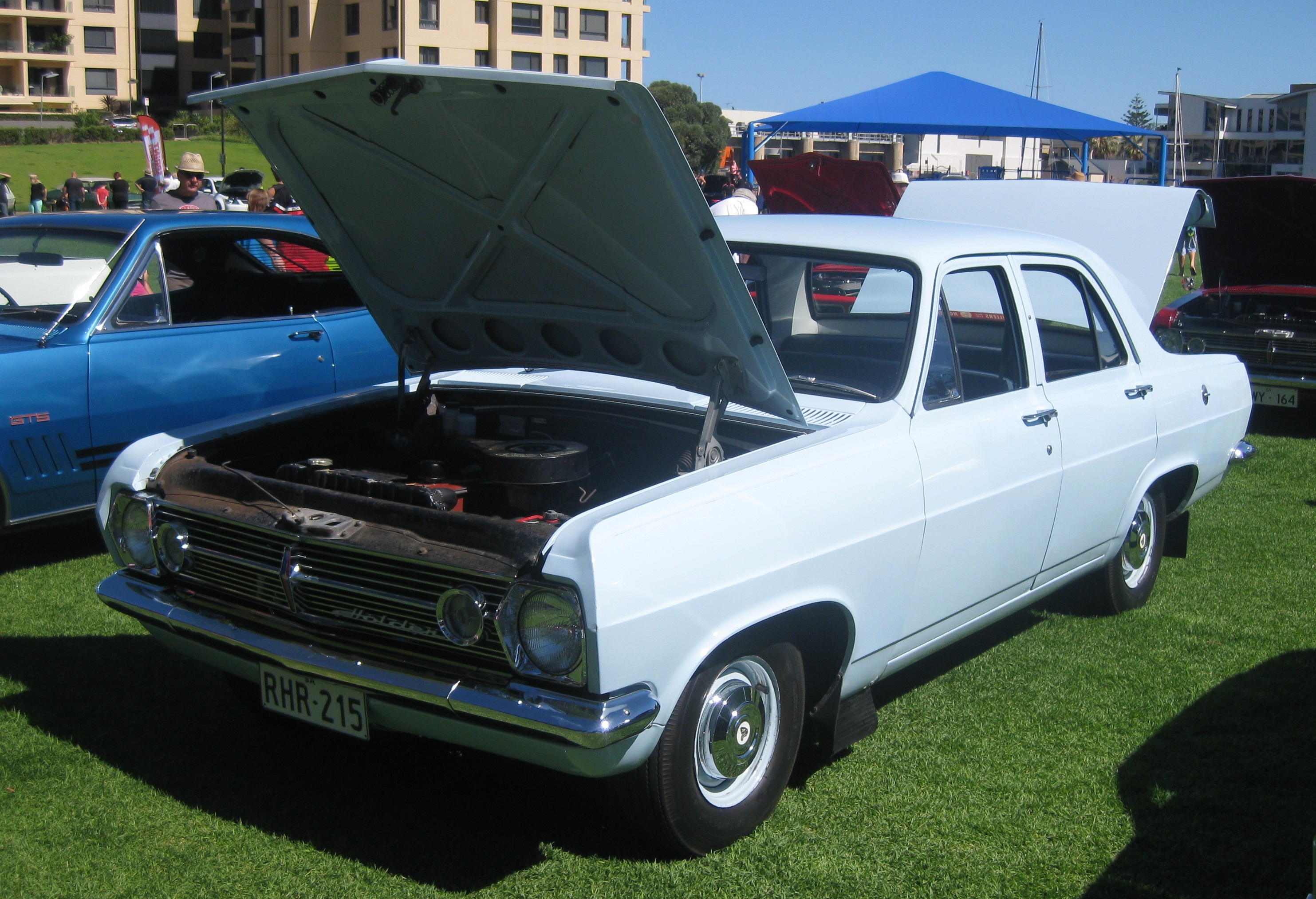
Holden Standard Sedan

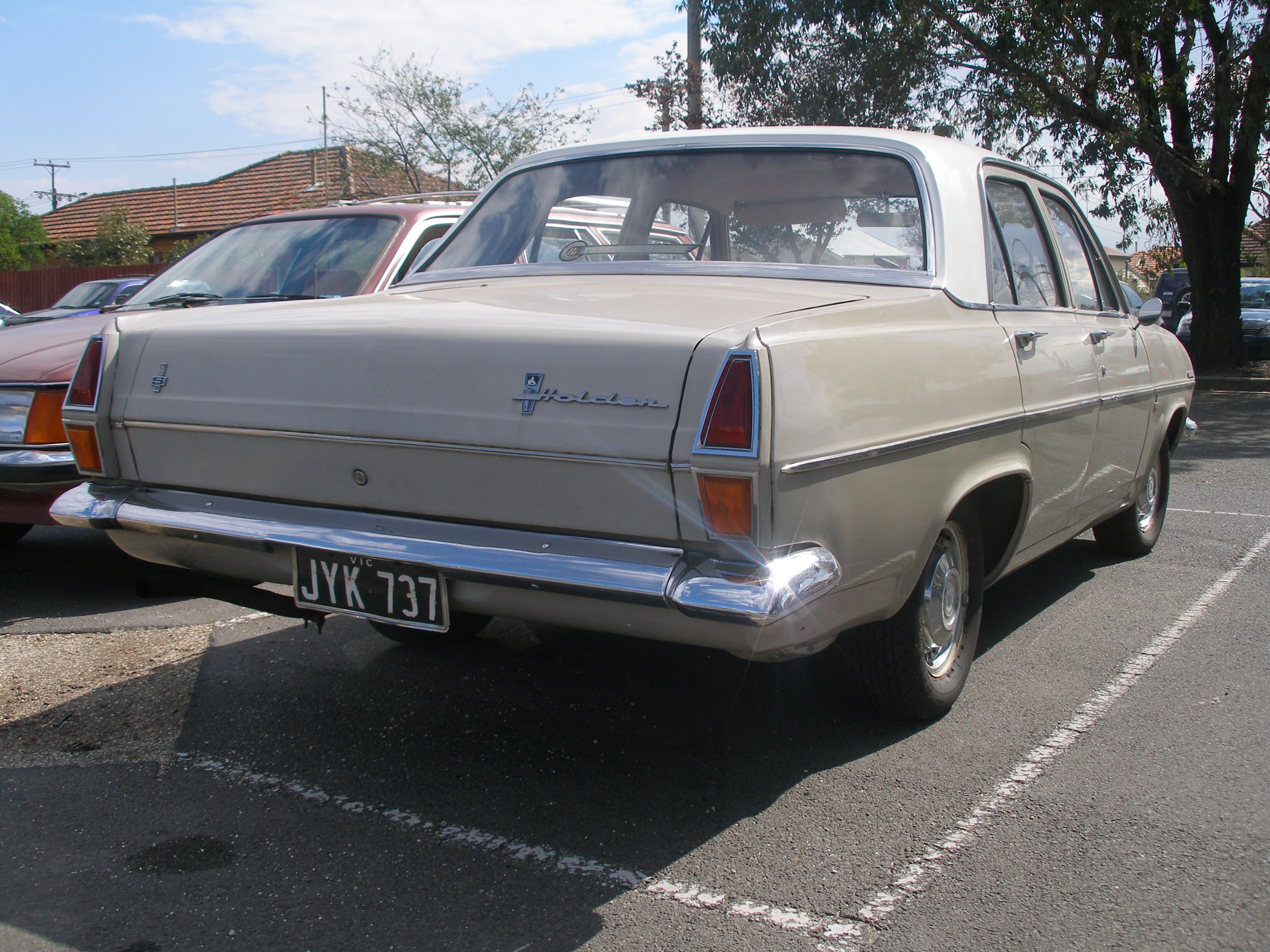
Holden Special Sedan

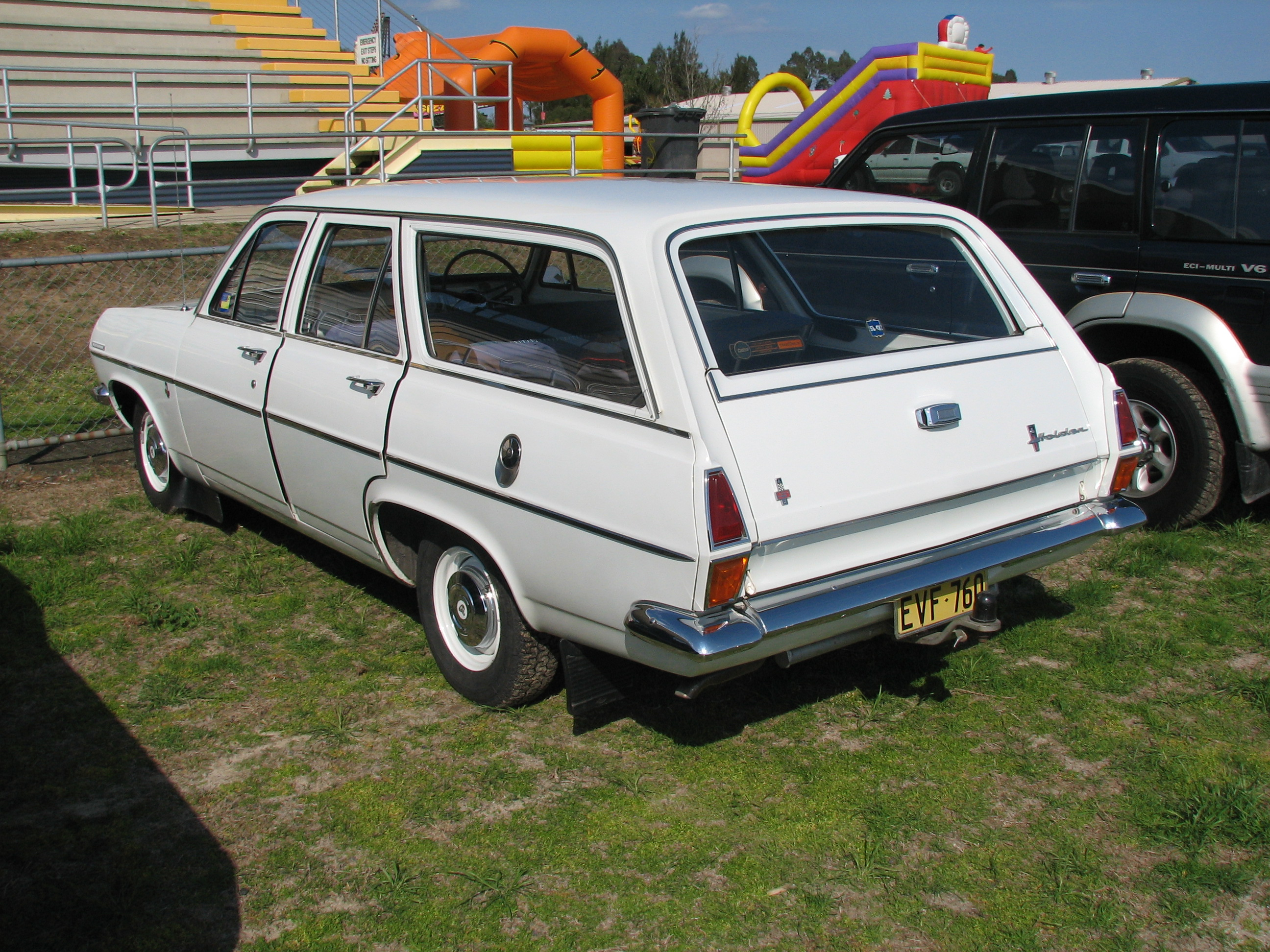
Holden Special Station Sedan

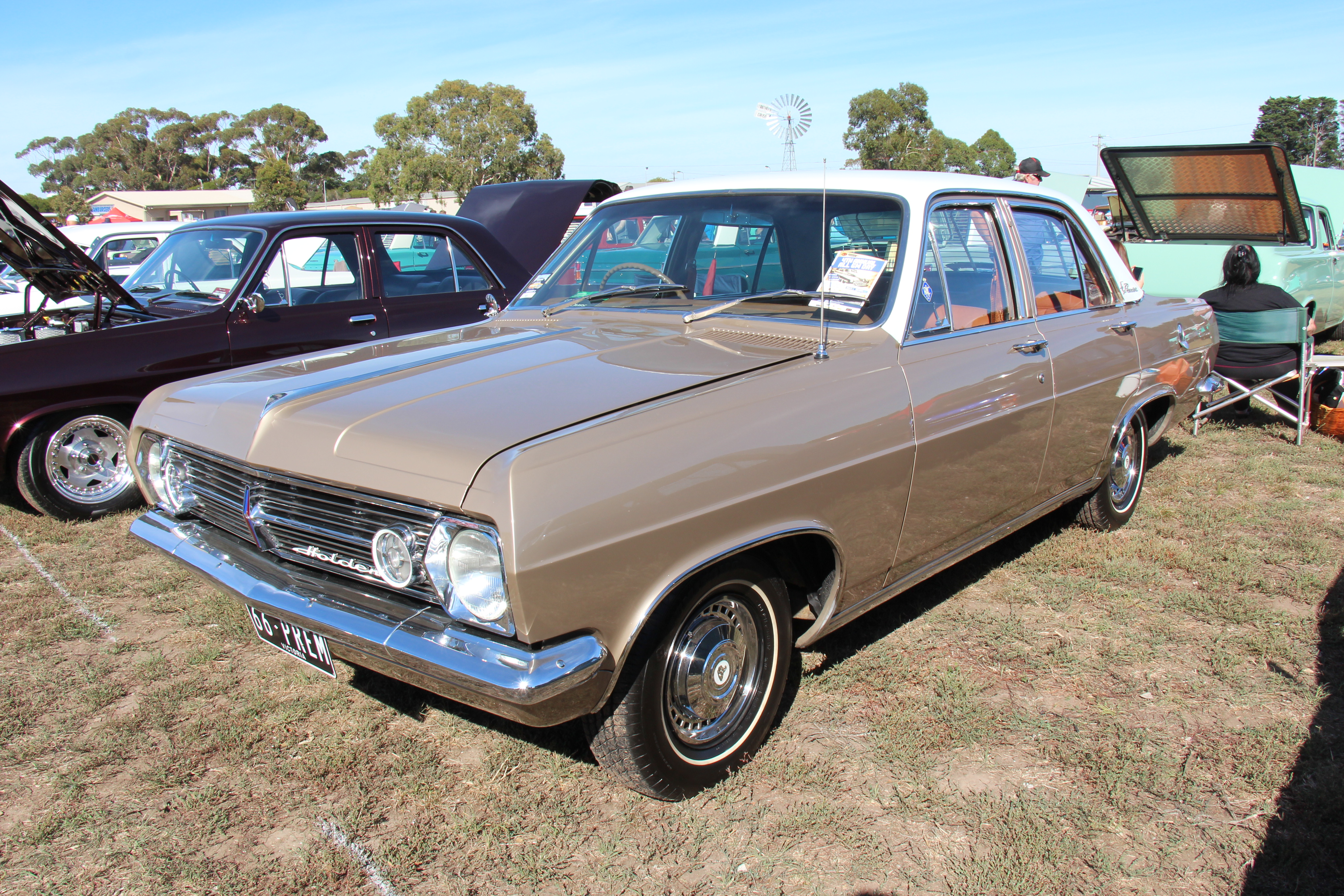
Holden Premier Sedan

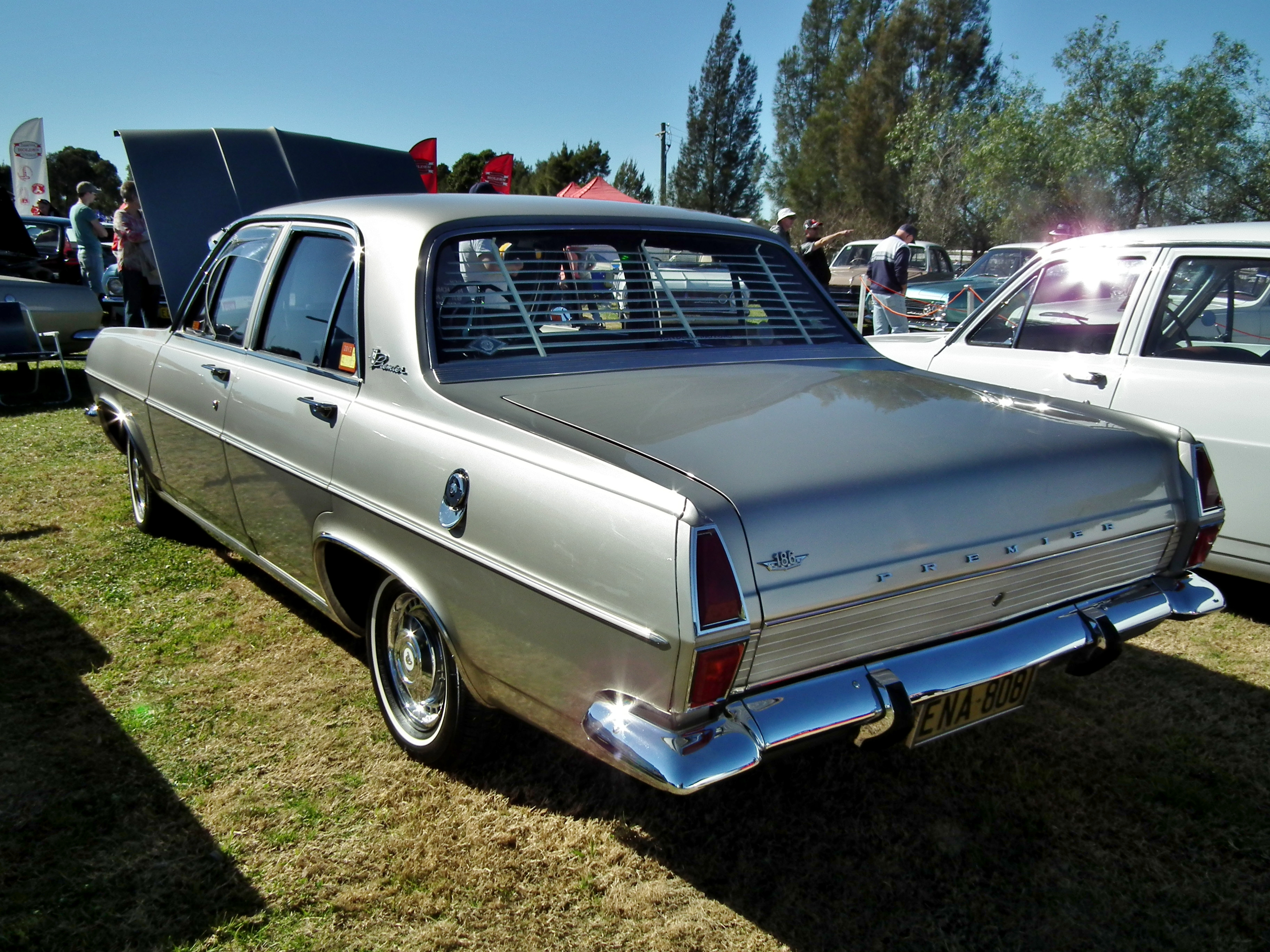
Holden Premier Sedan

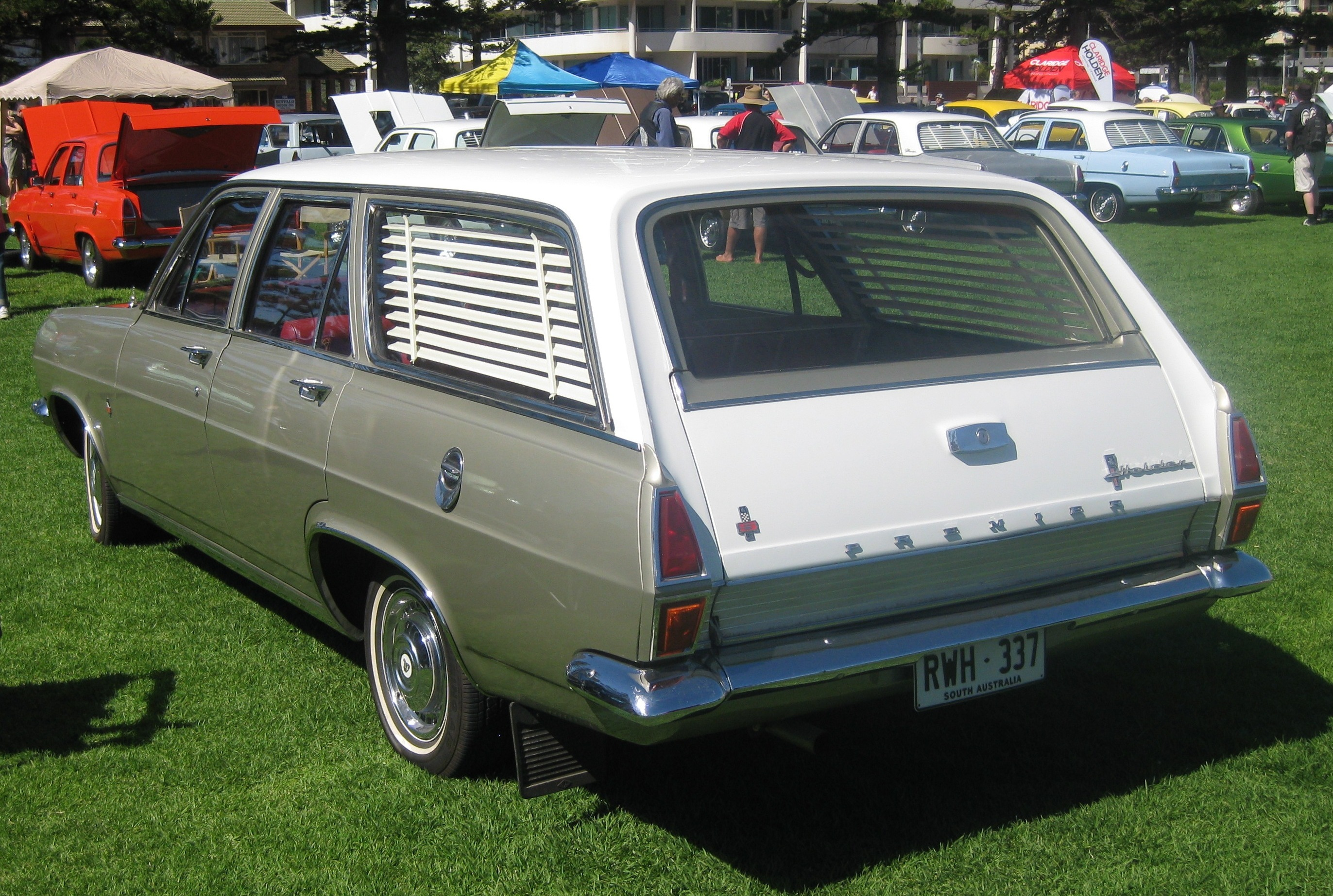
Holden Premier Station Sedan

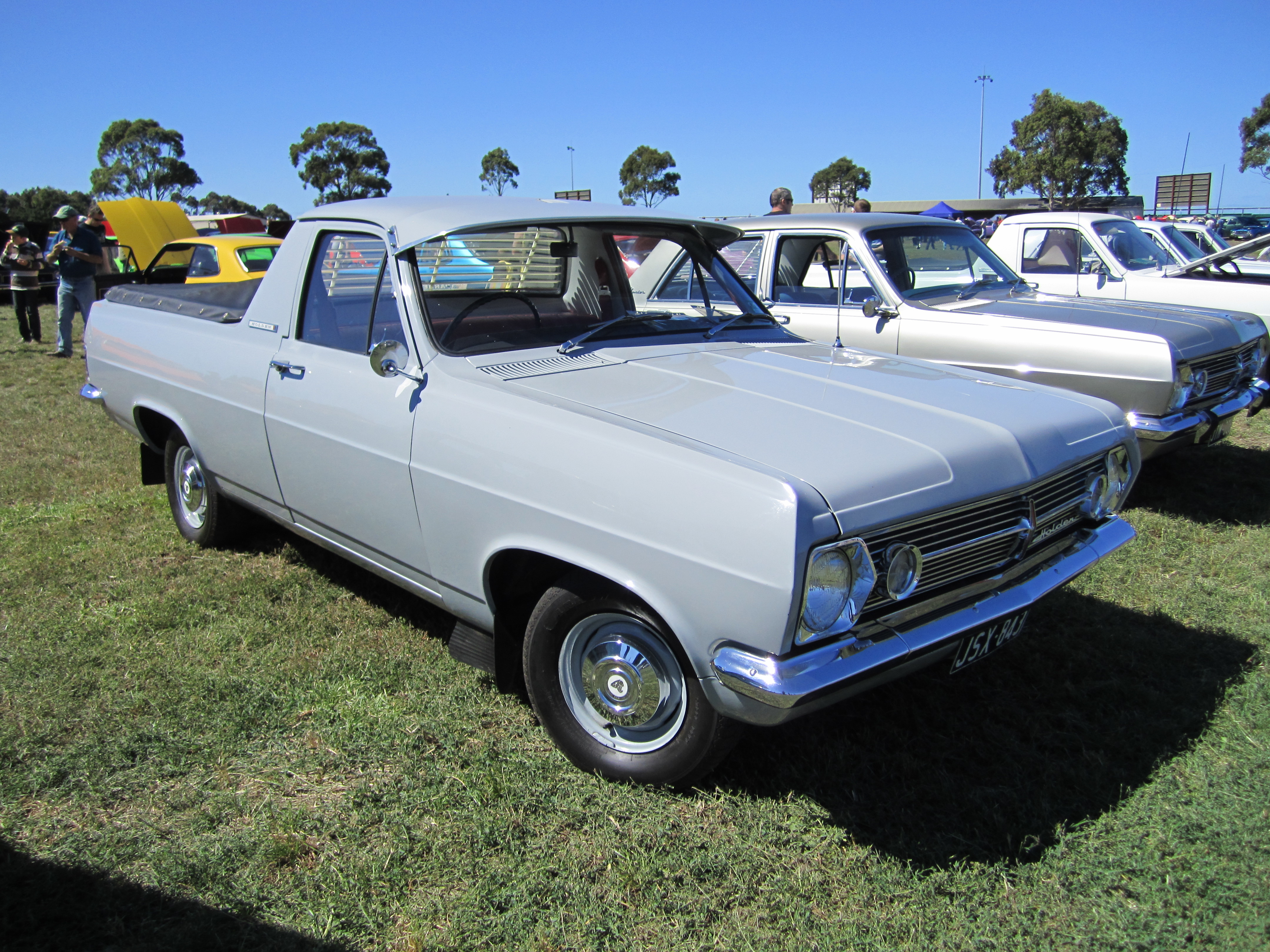
Holden Utility

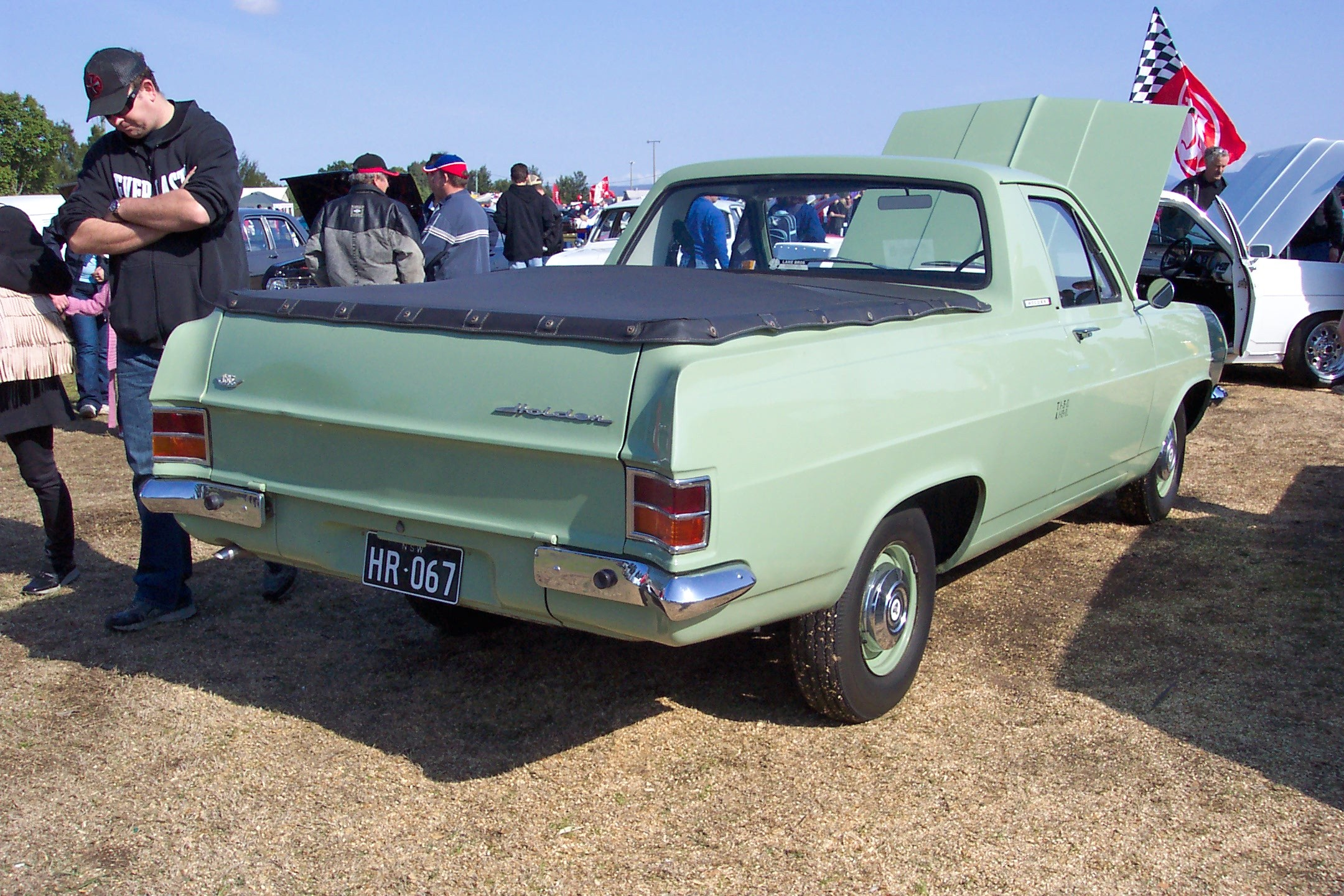
Holden Utility

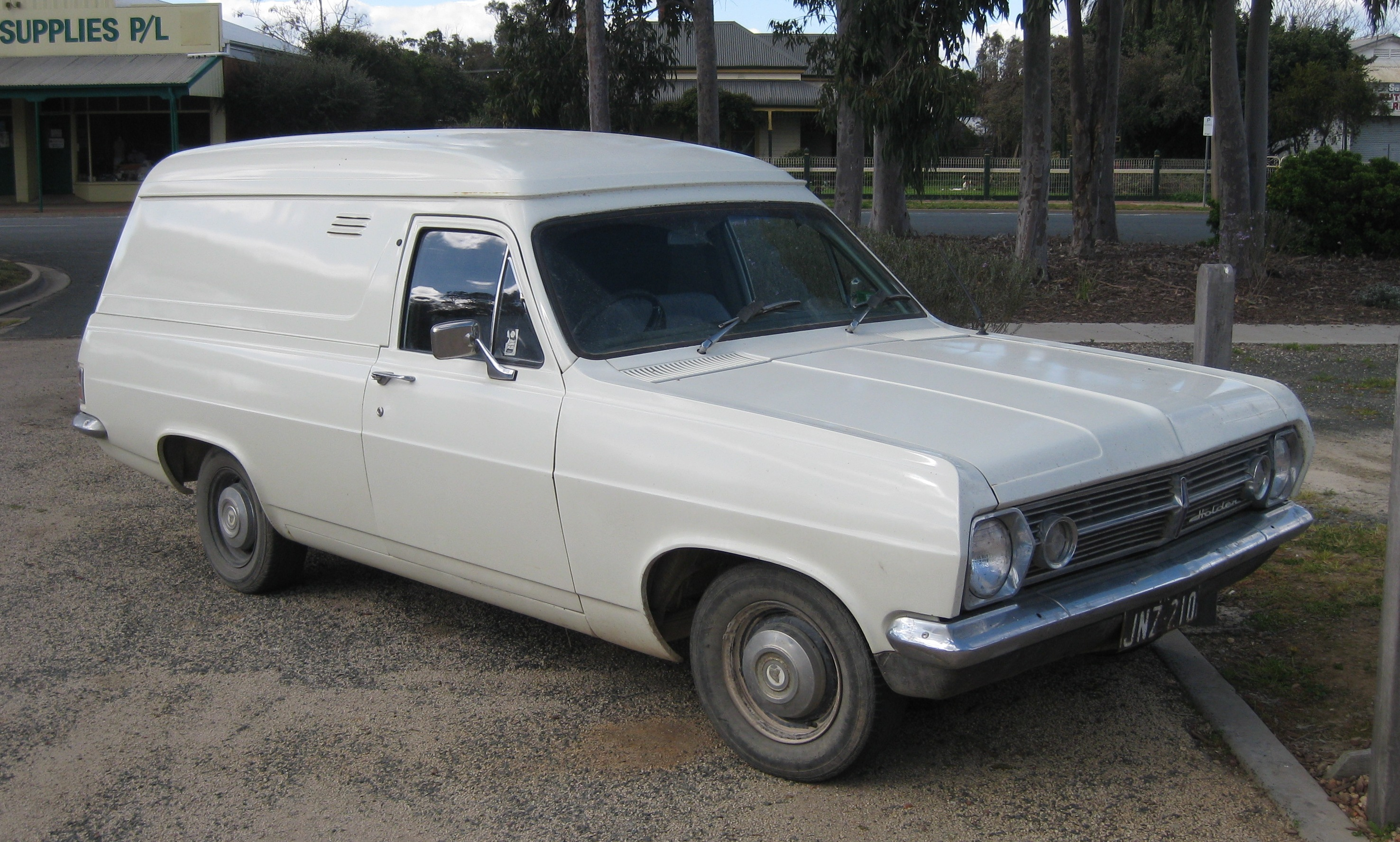
Holden Panel Van

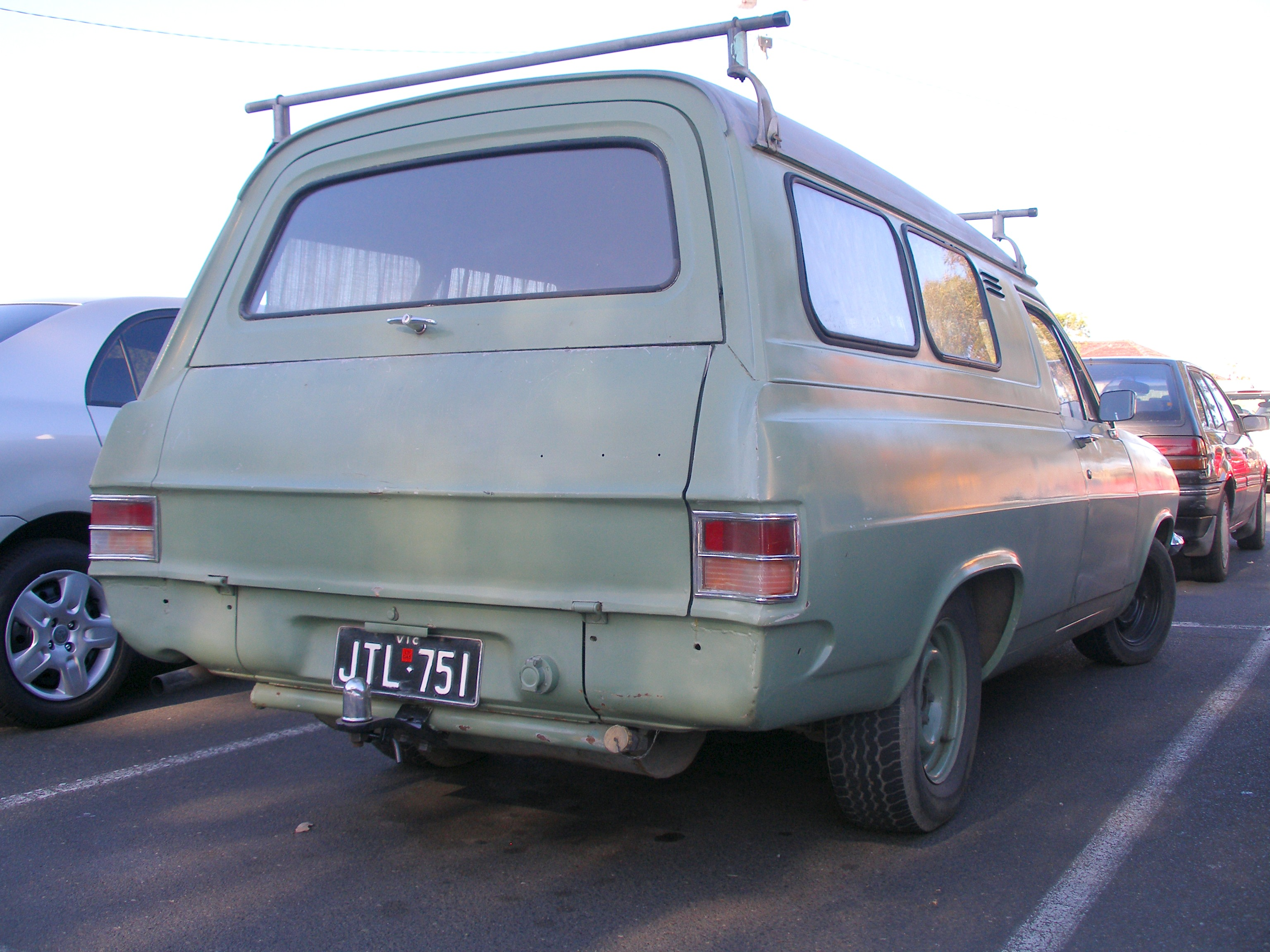
Holden Panel Van

== Engines and transmissions ==
The two versions of the inline, six-cylinder Holden Red motor were carried across from the HD series, both with increased engine capacity and a higher compression ratio of 9.2:1. The 114 bhp, 161 cu in (2.6 L) six was standard in all models except the Premiers. A 126 bhp 186 cu in (3.0 L) six was standard on Premiers and optional on all other models. The 145 bhp twin carburettor "X2" version of the "186" was initially available as an option on all models. The "X2" was replaced by the 145 bhp "186S" in June 1967 after Holden exhausted the remaining X2 intake manifolds; the new version was fitted with a single, two-barrel carburettor.

A lower compression (8.2:1) version of the 161 cu in (2.6 L) six was also available.

The 194 cu in (3.2 L) and later 230 cu in (3.8 L) Chevrolet six-cylinder engine was fitted for the South African market. This longer engine required the firewall to be scalloped out. This availability began partway through the HR's existence, with the 194 introduced for the 1967 model year. This was coupled to a fully synchronized, column-shifted, three-speed manual transmission sourced from Opel in West Germany. The Premier Automatic sold in South Africa retained the Australian engine, at least until 1969. The South African Holden Special had power disc brakes in front as standard from 1967.

A three-speed manual gearbox with column change and synchronization on the top two gears was standard on the HR, with a two-speed "Powerglide" automatic transmission available as an option. An Opel four-speed manual gearbox was offered from June 1967.

== Production and replacement ==
A total of 252,352 vehicles were produced up to January 1968 when the HR was replaced by the Holden HK series.
The price at release was A$2286 for the 161 cu in (2.6 L) Special Sedan manual and A$2856 for the Premier Station Sedan manual.

The HR was the first Holden to be assembled at General Motors New Zealand's brand-new plant in Trentham in 1967.

== Body ID Plate Decoder ==
HR Holden Australian Body Plate example

| BODY | HR225MR - 25434M |
| TRIM | 510 - E44 |
| PAINT | 585 - 9562 |
| INSERT | 120 |
| TOP | |

| BODY | Expand for body code details | | | | | | |
| Body type | 215 | Standard Sedan | 225 | Special Sedan | 235 | Premier Sedan | |
| Body type | 219 | Standard Station Sedan | 229 | Special Station Sedan | 239 | Premier Station Sedan | |
| Body type | 2106 | Utility | 2104 | Panel Van | | | |
| Trans | M | Manual | A | Automatic | | Manufacturing Plant | |
| Driver side | R | Right Hand Drive | | | | A | Adelaide |
| | | | | | | B | Brisbane |
| Build # | 25434 | This is the 25,434th Car Produced from the Plant | | | | M | Melbourne |
| Built @ | M | Manufacturing Plant (M = Melbourne) | | | | S | Sydney |

| PAINT | Expand for paint code details | | | | | |
| | PAINT | This is the base colour, on two tone cars it is the lower colour. | | | | |
| | 585 | Solid Colour | 587 | Metallic Colour | | |
| | 9562 | Paint Number (See below for codes) | | | | |
| TOP | TOP | This is the top colour on two tone cars. | | | | |
| | Colour Code | Colour Name | Colour Code | Colour Name | Colour Code | Colour Name |
| | 178 | Crocus Cream | 6904 | Spinner Grey | 8592 | Kurrewa Blue |
| | 104 | Brigade Red | 6905 | Calais Blue | 8688 | Jervois Cream |
| | 240 | Garrison Grey | 6906 | Valsand Fawn | 8689 | Glen Helen Green |
| | 583 | Holden Engine Red | 6914 | Reynella Maroon | 8692 | Sea Mist Jade Met |
| | 1703 | Savonnah Bronze Met | 6946 | Geneva Blue | 8695 | Oasis Green Met |
| | 1704 | Silver Mink Met | 6947 | Arno Green | 8696 | Pyrenees Blue Met |
| | 3675 | Satin Silver Met | 6950 | Arklow Aqua | 8698 | Tarana Turquoise |
| | 4706 | Minerva Blue | 6951 | Emden Fawn | 8699 | Gascoyne Green |
| | 4951 | Tully Blue | 6952 | Cardinal Grey | 8702 | Clinton Sand |
| | 5061 | Potters Ivory | 7111 | Sceptre Blue Met | 8703 | Sandown Fawn |
| | 5084 | Fowlers Ivory | 7112 | Diana Aqua Met | 8754 | Landale Gold Met |
| | 5091 | Windorah Beige | 7113 | Caberet Green Met | 8771 | Mullato Bronze Met |
| | 5093 | Winton Red | 7114 | Pitcairn Fawn Met | 8773 | Dante Red |
| | 5156 | Sorrel Tan | 7115 | Gossamer Grey Met | 8774 | Dover Blue |
| | 5384 | Royal Umber | 7142 | Contessa lue Met | 8775 | Dawson Aqua |
| | 6382 | Off White | 7143 | Florentine Green Met | 8776 | Opera Green |
| | 6664 | Corinth Blue | 7144 | Salient Grey Met | 8777 | Copra Fawn |
| | 6719 | Merredin Green Met | 7909 | Tawny Grey Met | 8778 | Suva Tan |
| | 6812 | Ardona Met Blue | 8328 | Alcazar Brown Met | 8816 | Pompadour Blue Met |
| | 6818 | Egmont Maroon Met | 8329 | Chinook Fawn Met | 8929 | Holden Engine Red X2 |
| | 6824 | Kembla Grey | 8330 | Corral Tan Met | 8954 | Regal Maroon Met |
| | 6826 | Lismore Grey | 8331 | Pablo Fawn Met | 9562 | Grecian White |
| | 6833 | Narrogin Green | 8332 | Beaucaire Blue Met | 9713 | Marlin Turquoise |
| | 6847 | Seaton Green | 8333 | Celeste Blue Met | 9856 | Welland Red |
| | 6875 | Apollo Turquoise | 8334 | Etruscan Brown Met | 9857 | Woodsman Green |
| | 6893 | Corroboree Red | 8335 | Cortez Red | 9858 | Coast Ivory |
| | 6894 | Hannans Gold | 8336 | Casbah Red | 10099 | Burgundy Met |
| | 6895 | Balmain Beige | 8388 | Cocos Fawn Met | 10317 | Cordovan |
| | 6898 | Taralga Fawn | 8566 | Finisterre Green | 10319 | Champagne |
| | 6901 | Bullfinch Green | 8568 | Pemberton Grey | 10367 | Holden Engine Grey |
| | 6902 | Ballet Green | 8569 | Sultan Red | | |
| | 6903 | Alaskan Aqua | 8591 | Lurline Blue | | |

| TRIM | Expand for Trim code details | | | | | |
| | 510 | Combination number - GMH Colour Code | | | | |
| | E78 | Interior trim combination number (See below for codes) | | | | |
| | E43 | Mephisto Red | E61 | Dover and Calais Blue | E67 | Bone |
| | E44 | Dover Blue | E62 | Dawson and Alaskan Aqua | E68 | Black |
| | E45 | Opera Green | E63 | Opera and Ballet Green | E69 | Astoria Red |
| | E46 | Copra dawn | E64 | Copra and Vasland Fawn | E70 | Samoan Tan |
| | E49 | Mephisto Red | E73 | Mephisto Red | E71 | Bone |
| | E50 | Dover Blue | E74 | Dover Blue | E72 | Black |
| | E51 | Opera Green | E75 | Opera Green | | |
| | E52 | Copra Dawn | E76 | Copra Fawn | F40 | Goya Red |
| | E55 | Dante and Mephisto Red | E78 | Mephisto Red | F41 | Paloma Blue |
| | E56 | Dover and Calais Blue | E79 | Dover Blue | F42 | Honey Fawn |
| | E57 | Dawson and Alaskan Aqua | E80 | Opera Green | F43 | Goya Red |
| | E58 | Opera and Ballet Green | E81 | Copra Fawn | F44 | Paloma Blue |
| | E59 | Copra and Valsand Fawn | E65 | Astoria Red | F45 | Honey Fawn |
| | E60 | Dante and Mephisto Red | E66 | Samoan Tan | | |

| INSERT | Expand for insert code details (Assembly configurations for HR's built in Melbourne only) | | | | | |
| | 040 | Model Extension - See below for codes | | | | |
| | 040 | 161 Manual | 148 | 186 + Discs + LSD | 417 | 161 Low Comp Manual |
| | 041 | 161 Manual | 160 | 186 Manual | 1240 | 186 S |
| | 042 | 161 Manual + Discs | 162 | 186 Manual | 1241 | 186 S |
| | 044 | | 165 | 186 Manual + Discs | 1242 | 186 S + Discs |
| | 045 | 161 Manual + Discs | 166 | 186 Manual + Discs + LSD | 1244 | 186 S |
| | 120 | 186 Automatic | 240 | X2 Automatic | 1245 | 188 S + Discs + LSD |
| | 122 | 186 Automatic + Discs | 241 | X2 | 1246 | 186 S + Discs + LSD |
| | 123 | 186 Automatic | 242 | X2 Auto + Discs | 1248 | 186 S + Discs + LSD |
| | 124 | 186 Automatic | 244 | X2 Manual + Automatic | 1742 | 186 S + 4Speed + LSD |
| | 126 | 186 Automatic | 245 | X2 Automatic + Discs + LSD | 1744 | 186 S + 4Speed |
| | 140 | | 246 | X2 Automatic + Discs + LSD | 1745 | 186 S + 4Speed + Discs + LSD |
| | 141 | 186 Automatic | 248 | X2 + Discs | 1746 | 186 S + 4Speed + Discs + LSD |
| | 142 | 186 Automatic | 276 | X2 Manual + Discs | 1748 | 186 S + 4Speed + Discs + LSD |
| | 144 | 186 Manual | 282 | Manual | 1782 | 186 S + 4Speed + Discs |
| | 145 | 186 + Discs | 286 | X2 Manual + Discs + LSD | | |
| | 146 | 186 + Discs + LSD | 400 | 161 Low Comp Manual | | |
