= Lowood Aerodrome =

Lowood Aerodrome
- Mount Tarampa, Queensland in Australia
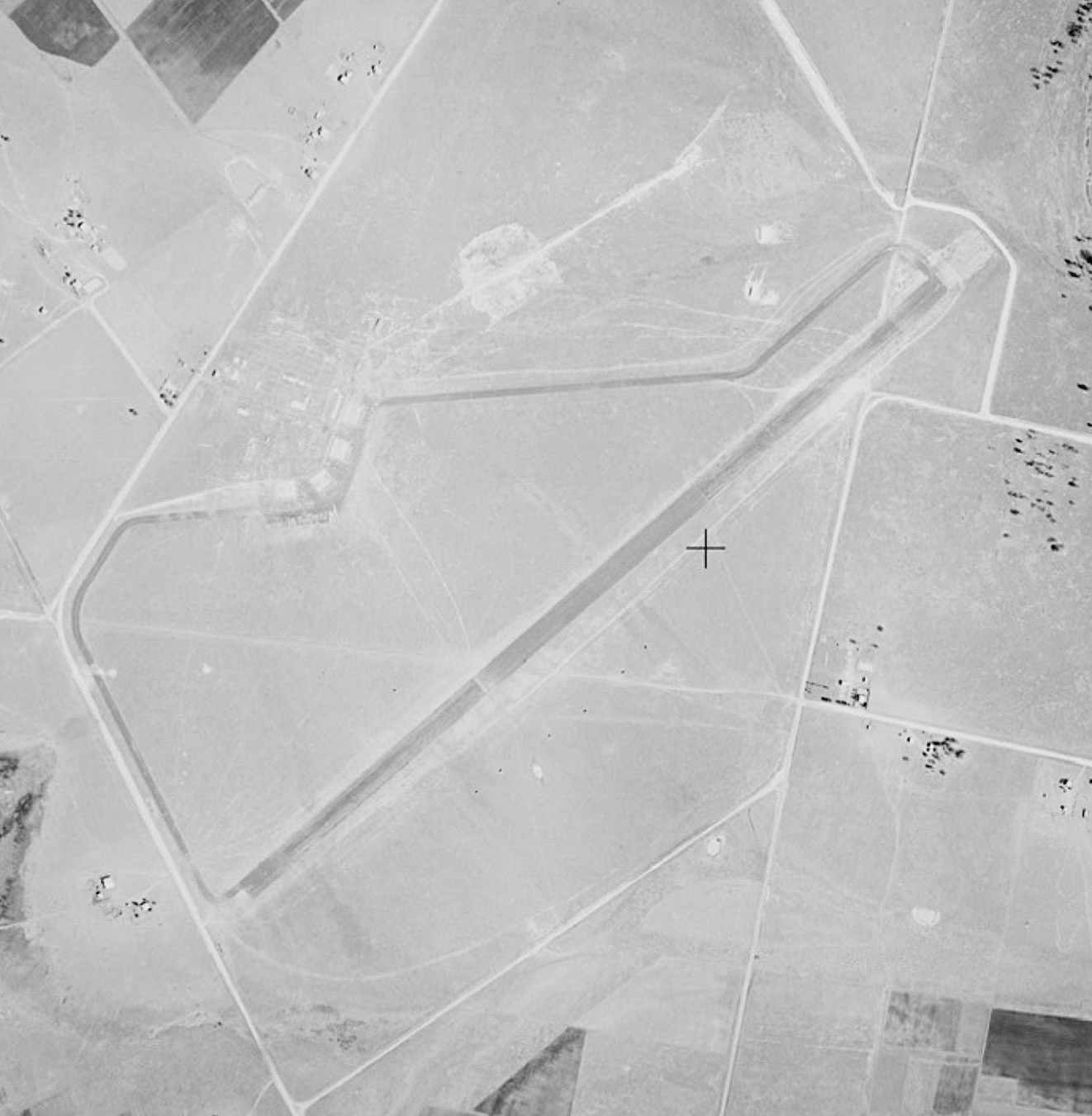
- Aerial photograph of the former Lowood Aerodrome captured on 4 July 1951, when it was still used as a racing circuit.

Site information
- Type: Military airfield
- Owner: Australian Air Board; Australian Defence Force
- Operator: Royal Australian Air Force

Location
- Shown within Australia Lowood Aerodrome (Australia)
- Coordinates: 27°27′42″S 152°29′23″E

Site history
- Built: 1942
- In use: 1942 - 1945
- Fate: Abandoned
- Battles/wars: Pacific War

Lowood Aerodrome was a Royal Australian Air Force station in Mount Tarampa, Queensland in Australia. During the Second World War, it began operating as an airfield for the Elementary Flying Training School with supporting relief landing grounds. As war needs grew, it was converted into an operational base in 1943 and housed multiple squadrons and hundreds of personnel. At the end of the war, the airfield was closed and turned into a racing circuit.

== History ==
Around 620 acres of land at Mount Tarampa, west of Lowood were acquired by the Commonwealth in 1941 for the construction of Lowood Aerodrome. The acquisition had cost approximately £4,000. In September 1941, construction commenced by the Queensland Main Roads Commission (MRC), having a total approximate expenditure of £149,274. Construction works involved clearing, grubbing, and grading, establishing a 6,000 foot long runway measuring 150 feet wide. Taxiways, dispersal strips, and hardstands were also built. During peak construction, up to 181 Main Roads Commission staff were employed.

Following construction, the No. 12 Elementary Flying Training School (EFTS) arrived at Lowood Airfield in January 1942 from Bundaberg. Relief landing grounds were also established at Wivenhoe and Coominya to support training operations. At the time, it was still premature and contained incomplete hangars. Several weeks later, heavy storms damaged numerous exposed Tiger Moths. In February 1942, some huts were modified to accommodate Women's Auxiliary Australian Air Force personnel. The first US aircraft were dispersed to the airfield that month following a false alarm regarding an unidentified aircraft carrier sighted off Moreton Island. It was disclosed as being USS Langely. The Americans returned on a longer-term basis beginning in March 1942. On 13 March 1942, P-39 Airacobras of the 36th Fighter Squadron and 80th Squadron of 8th Fighter Group, USAAF, arrived at Lowood Airfield. After arriving at Sydney on 28 March 1942, the 101st Coastal Artillery Battalion provided its 0.50" calibre machine guns around the airfield, while the 94th Coastal Artillery Regiment deployed some of its searchlights. In April 1942, the 36th Fighter Squadron relocated to Antill Plains Airfield, and the 80th Squadron moved to Petrie Airfield (designated A1) by 10 May 1942. On 6 June 1942, the No. 23 Squadron RAAF, relocated to Lowood Airfield and was redesignated No. 23 (Dive Bomber) Squadron. It was progressively equipped with the Bell P-39 Airacobra and CAC Wirraway aircraft at the airfield. Following training, it was dispatched to Nadzab Airfield in Papua New Guinea, engaging in strike and bombing operations along Markham Valley.

=== Operational use ===
In September 1942, the RAAF resumed control of Lowood again and developed it as an Operational Base by February 1943. Coominya No. 2 was developed into an ancillary landing ground for the airfield. In late January 1943, land was acquired for an Operations building, positioned on the north slope of Mount Tarampa overlooking the airfield. By May 1943, Lowood Airfiled was occupied by the 23 and 71 Squadrons RAAF, with up to 570 personnel on the base. At the time, there were no permanent bomb stores, although some were later built on the western side of Mount Tarampa. By May 1943, the MRC was still working on developing taxiways towards the hideouts, and construction on a new Wireless Telegraphy Transmitting station and Operations building commenced on 30 May. Both facilities were semi-underground and utilised reinforced concrete, having a curved roof section. The W/T Transmitting station was located approximately 4 kilometres east of Lowood Airfield. By December that year, both buildings were reported as 95% complete, though fitting of both buildings were still occurring during early 1945. On 9 December 1943, a conference at RAAF HQ established that the Operations building would only be used as a shadow operations signal building, provided that there was an enemy attack.

The remaining No. 23 Squadron RAAF echelon departed Lowood Airfield on 30 April 1944. In late November 1944, sealing of the runway commenced, and was completed by early 1945. Plans were also made to clear the approaches to the runway for crash strip extensions on the northwest and southeast ends. By June 1945, it was occupied by 18 Beauforts of the 32 Squadron, and also four Survey Flight aircraft.

=== Closure ===
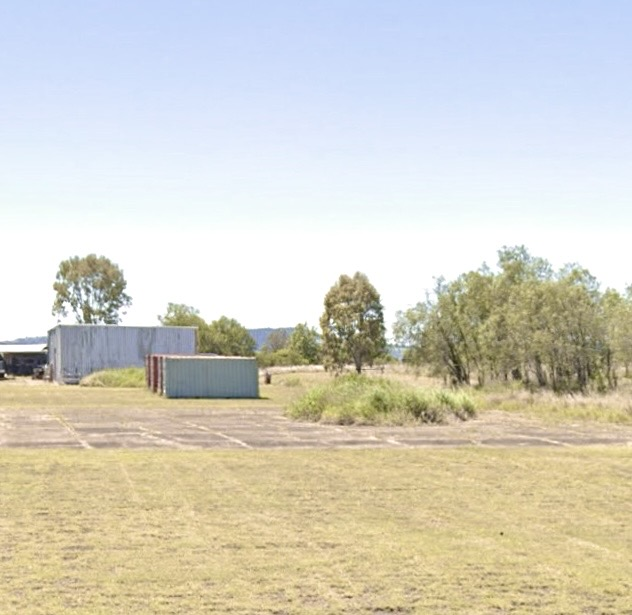
Old foundations of the westernmost hangar at Lowood Aerodrome, Irwin Road.

Following the Second World War, Lowood Airfield was retained by the council as it had good visibility and a runway in all-weather condition. It began use as a motorsports track, evolving to become the Lowood Airfield Circuit. After the track closed in 1966, the area was subdivided into allotments. Today, some of the concrete foundations are still visible, and Daisy Road follows the alignment of the main runway.

== Units ==
The following units that were based at Lowood Airfield:

RAAF

- No. 12 Elementary Flying Training School RAAF between January 1942 and April 1942, equipped with de Havilland Tiger Moths
- No. 23 Squadron RAAF between June 1942 and early 1944, equipped with Bell P-39 Airacobras, later re-equipped with Vultee Vengeances
- No. 75 Squadron RAAF during July 1942, equipped with Curtiss P-40 Kittyhawks
- No. 71 Squadron RAAF from late 1942 or early 1943 to December 1943, equipped with Avro Ansons; A Flight of the squadron was based there from May 1942 to June 1944
- Survey Flight RAAF from March 1943 to January 1946
- No. 21 Squadron RAAF from late 1943 to early 1944, equipped with Vultee Vengeances
- No. 24 Squadron RAAF circa April 1944 to June 1944, equipped initially with Vultee Vengeances and later with Consolidated B-24 Liberators
- No. 32 Squadron RAAF between May 1944 and November 1945, equipped with Bristol Beauforts
- No. 14 Operational Base Unit RAAF from November 1942 to February 194
- No. 47 Operational Base Unit RAAF from December 1943 to January 1944, while in transit
- No. 10 Repair and Salvage Unit RAAF between September 1942 and November 1942
