= Cooper T33 =

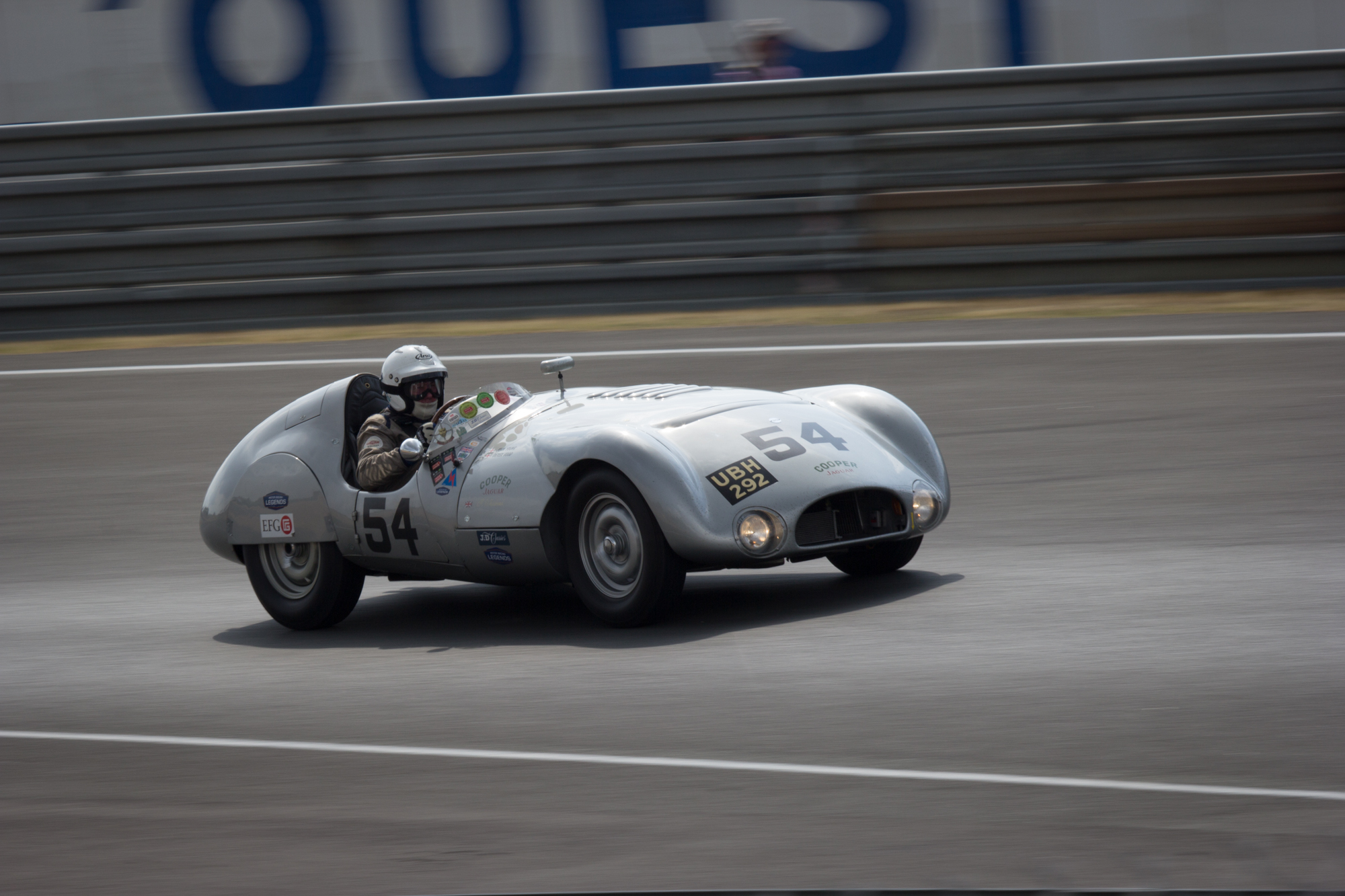
- Category: Sports racing car
- Constructor: Cooper

Technical specifications
- Axle track: 52 in (132.1 cm) (Front); 52 in (132.1 cm) (Rear)
- Wheelbase: 91 in (2,311.4 mm)
- Engine: Jaguar 3,442 cc (210 cu in) I6 naturally-aspirated mid-engined
- Transmission: 5-speed manual
- Power: 250 hp (190 kW)
- Weight: 1,905 lb (864.1 kg)

Competition history
Races	Wins	Podiums
57	10	21

The Cooper T33 is a lightweight sports car, designed and developed by British manufacturer Cooper Cars in 1954. Between 1954 and 1958, it managed to score 10 race wins, and 21 podium finishes. It is powered by the 250 hp (190 kW), 3.4-litre, XK engine, which was also used in many Jaguar sports cars.
