= Holden HD =

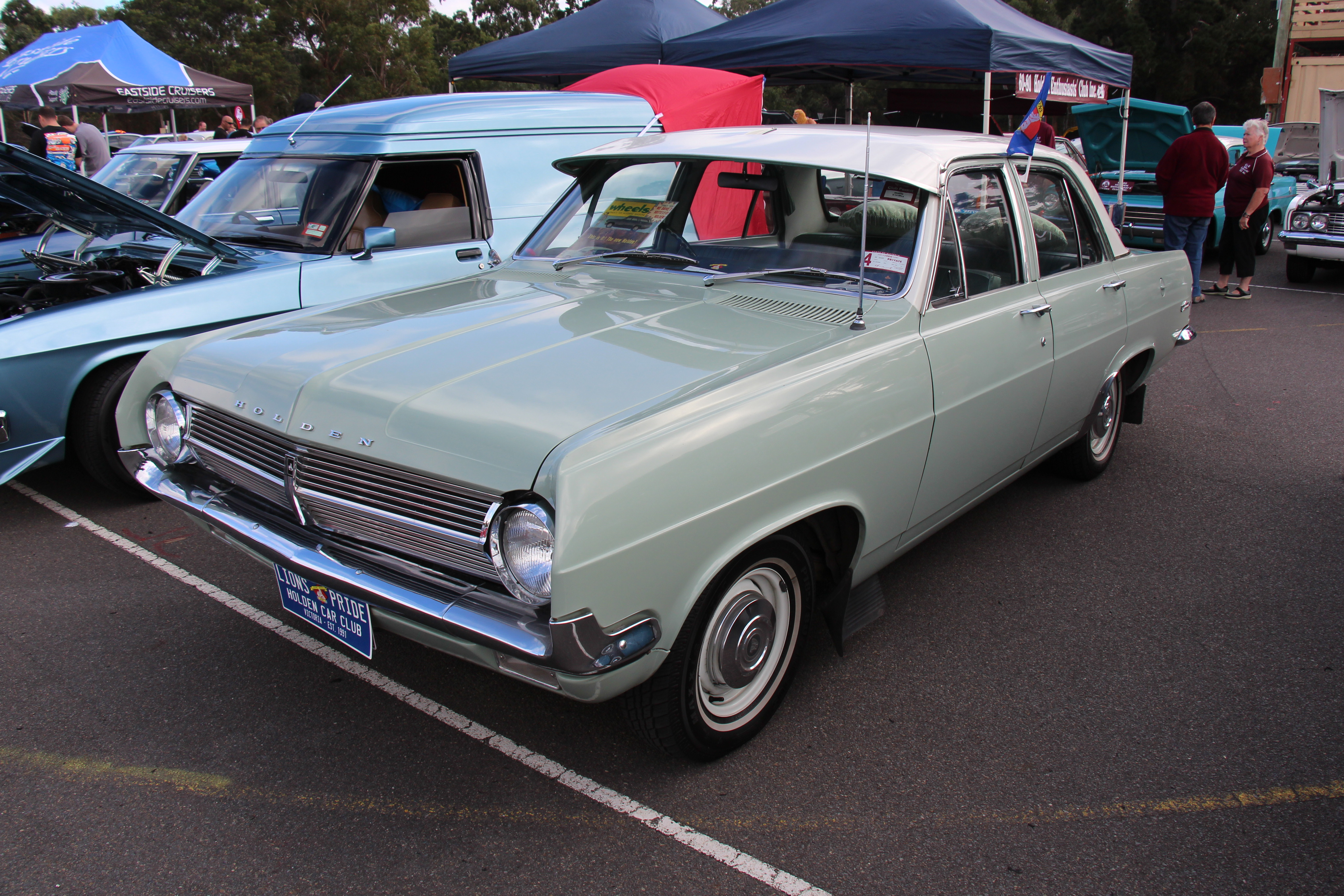
- Holden Special Sedan

Overview
- Manufacturer: Holden
- Production: Sedan & wagon: February 1965 – April 1966; Utility & panel van: July 1965 – April 1966
- Designer: Leo Pruneau, Don Laski

Body and chassis
- Class: Mid-size
- Body style: 4-door sedan 5-door station wagon 2-door coupé utility 2-door panel van
- Layout: FR layout

Powertrain
- Engine: 2,447 cc (2.4 L) 149 I6; 2,940 cc (2.9 L) 179/179 X2 I6; 3,185 cc (3.2 L) I6
- Transmission: 3-speed manual 2-speed "Powerglide" automatic

Dimensions
- Wheelbase: 106.0 inches (2692mm)
- Length: Sedan: 179.6 inches (4562mm); Wagon: 179.8 inches (4567mm)
- Width: 70.0 inches (1778mm)
- Height: Sedan: 59.1 inches (1501mm); Wagon: 59.3 inches (1506mm)
- Kerb weight: Standard Sedan: 2595lb (1177kg)

Chronology
- Predecessor: Holden EH
- Successor: Holden HR

The Holden HD series is a range of automobiles which were produced by Holden in Australia from 1965 to 1966.

== Overview ==
The Holden HD sedans and station wagons were released on 15 February 1965 with coupe utility and panel van body styles following in July of that year. The HD range replaced the Holden EH series which had been in production since 1963. The HD had a completely new body, which was wider and longer than that of the EH and offered significant increases in passenger space, load space and equipment levels. Body styling exhibited strong similarities to the Vauxhall Victor FC of the previous year, including that car's unusual concave rear window. Disc brakes were offered for the first time on a Holden model and were available from 1 June 1965.

The optional Hydramatic automatic transmission as used in the EH was now replaced by a Powerglide two– speed unit. The HD was also the first Holden to be offered with a factory performance engine option, the "X2" which included twin downdraft Stromberg carburetors and exhaust headers. The HD is often confused with the later HR but can be recognised by the front indicators being mounted under the bumper (the HR had round indicators mounted in the grille) and the wrap around tail lights at the back (the HR had narrow lights that extended up the end of the rear fins but not around the edge)

== Model range ==
The Holden HD passenger vehicle range offered 4 door sedan and 5 door station wagon bodystyles in three trim levels with the six models marketed as:

- Holden Standard Sedan
- Holden Standard Station Sedan
- Holden Special Sedan
- Holden Special Station Sedan
- Holden Premier Sedan
- Holden Premier Station Sedan

The HD commercial vehicle range was offered in 2 door coupe utility and 2 door panel van variants, marketed as:

- Holden Utility
- Holden Panel Van
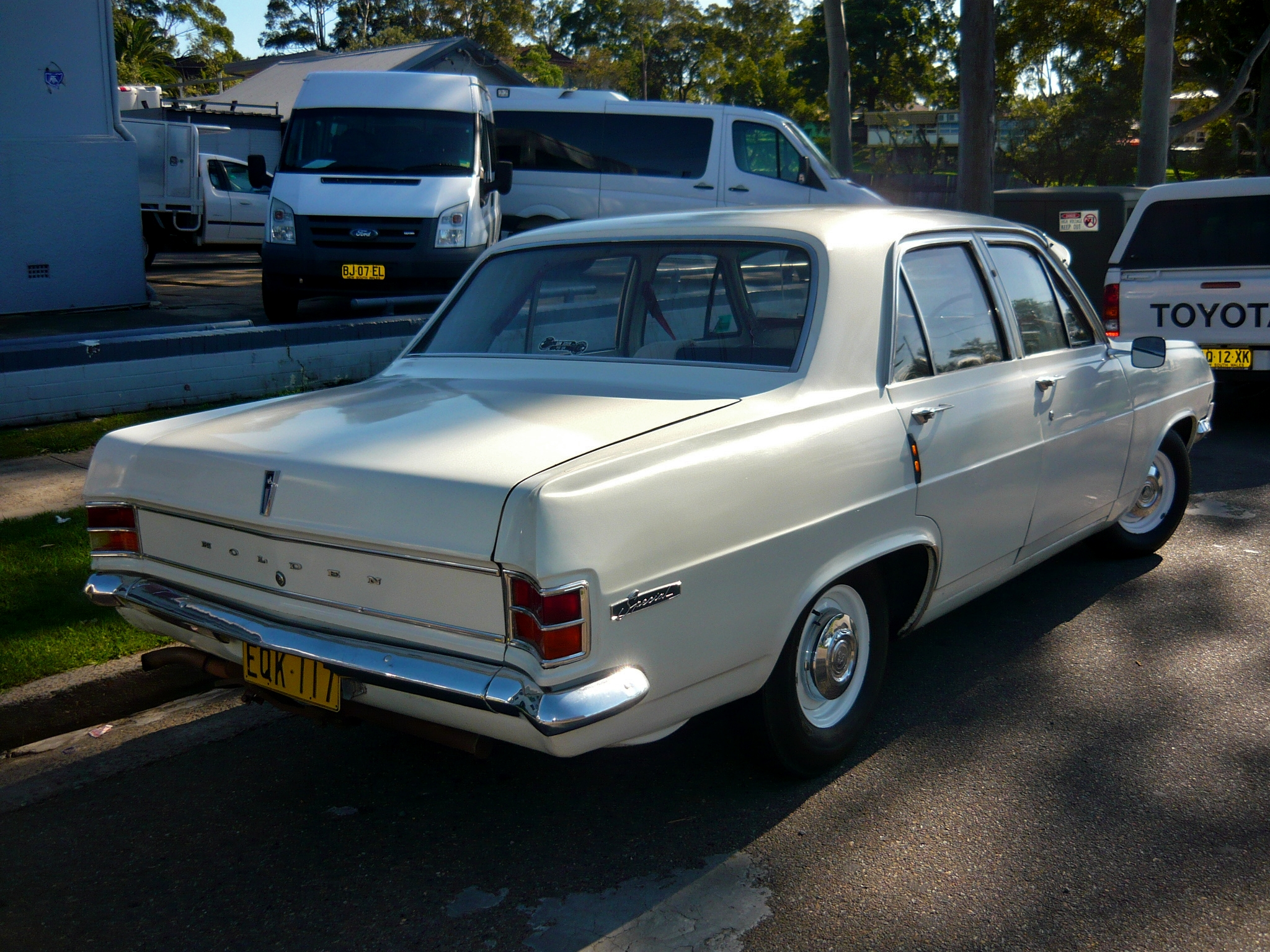
Holden Special Sedan

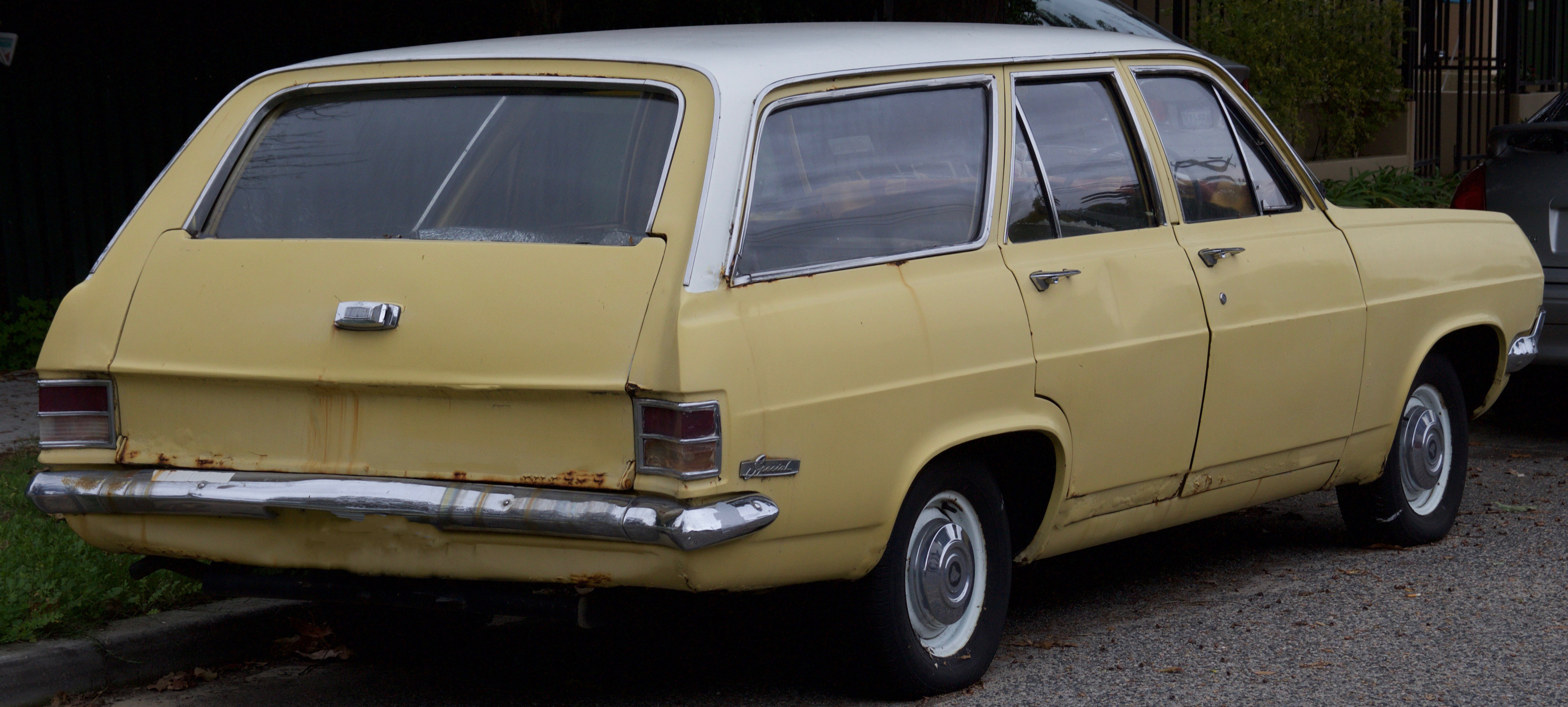
Holden Special Station Sedan

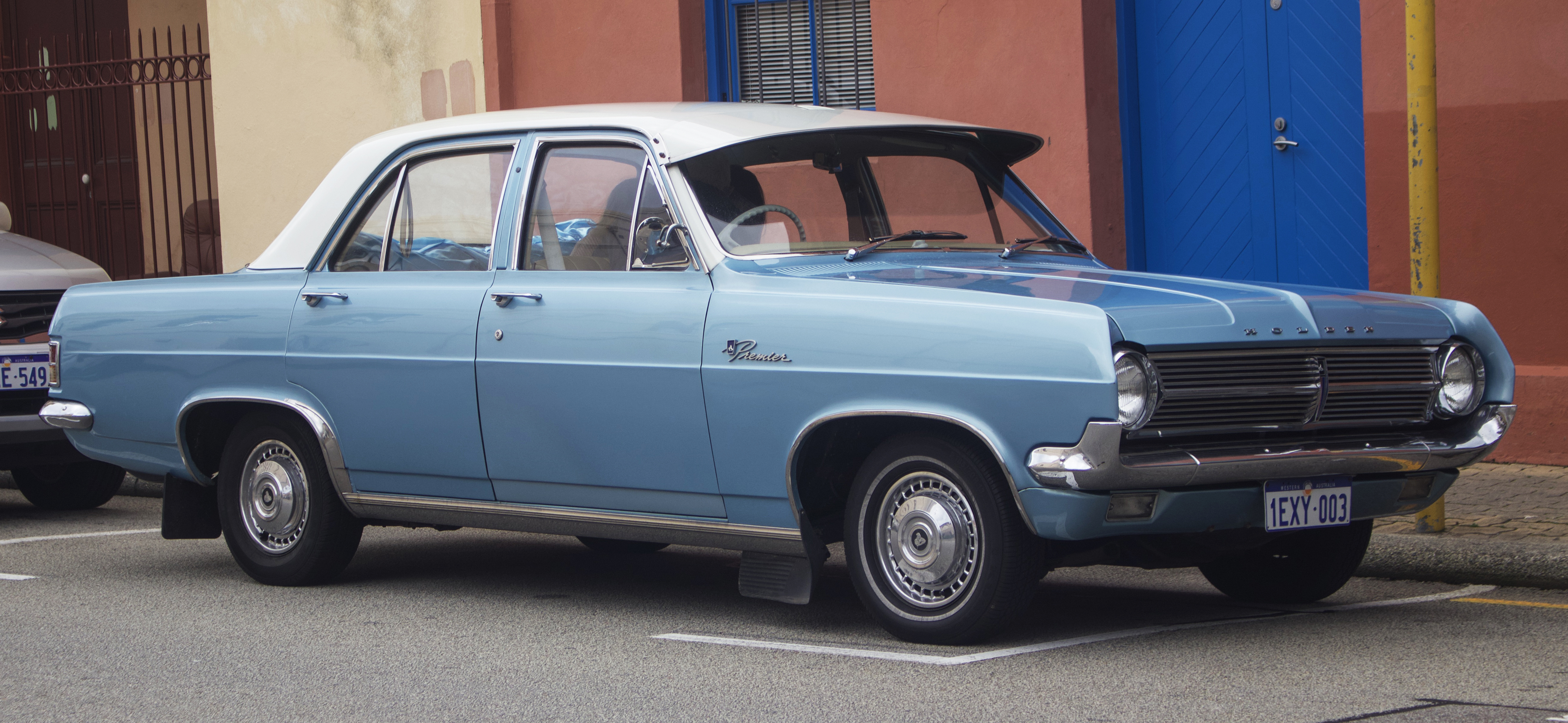
Holden Premier Sedan

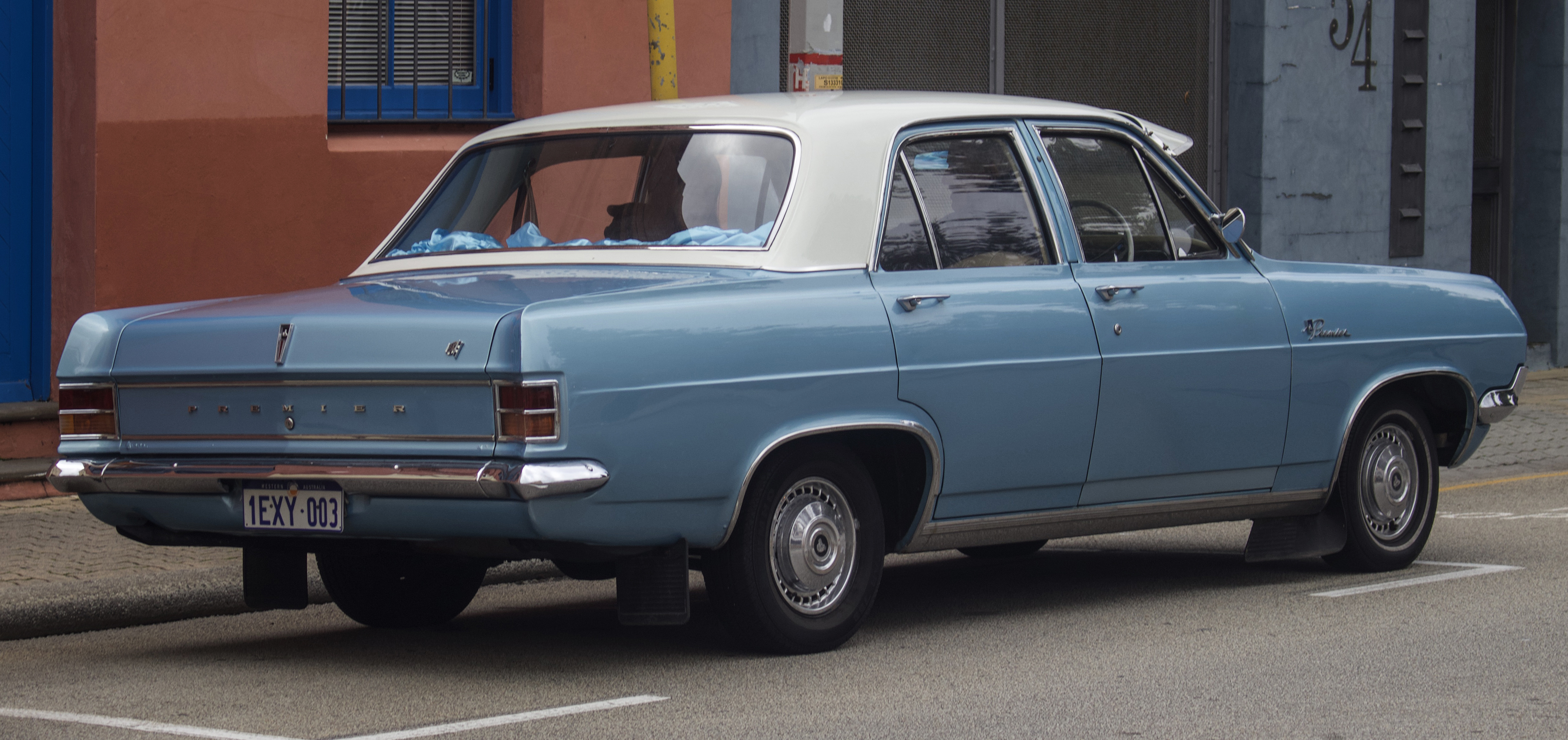
Holden Premier Sedan

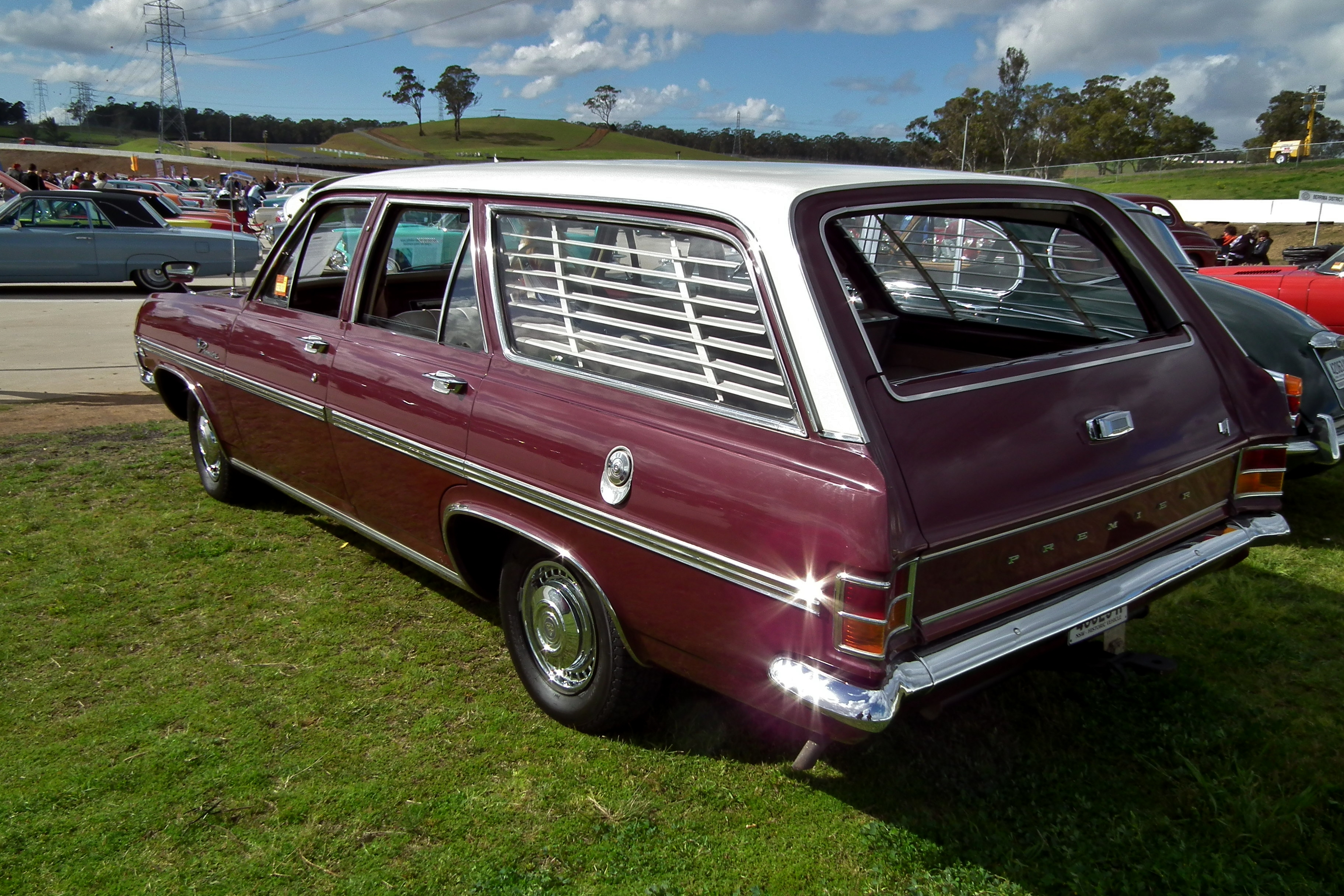
Holden Premier Station Sedan

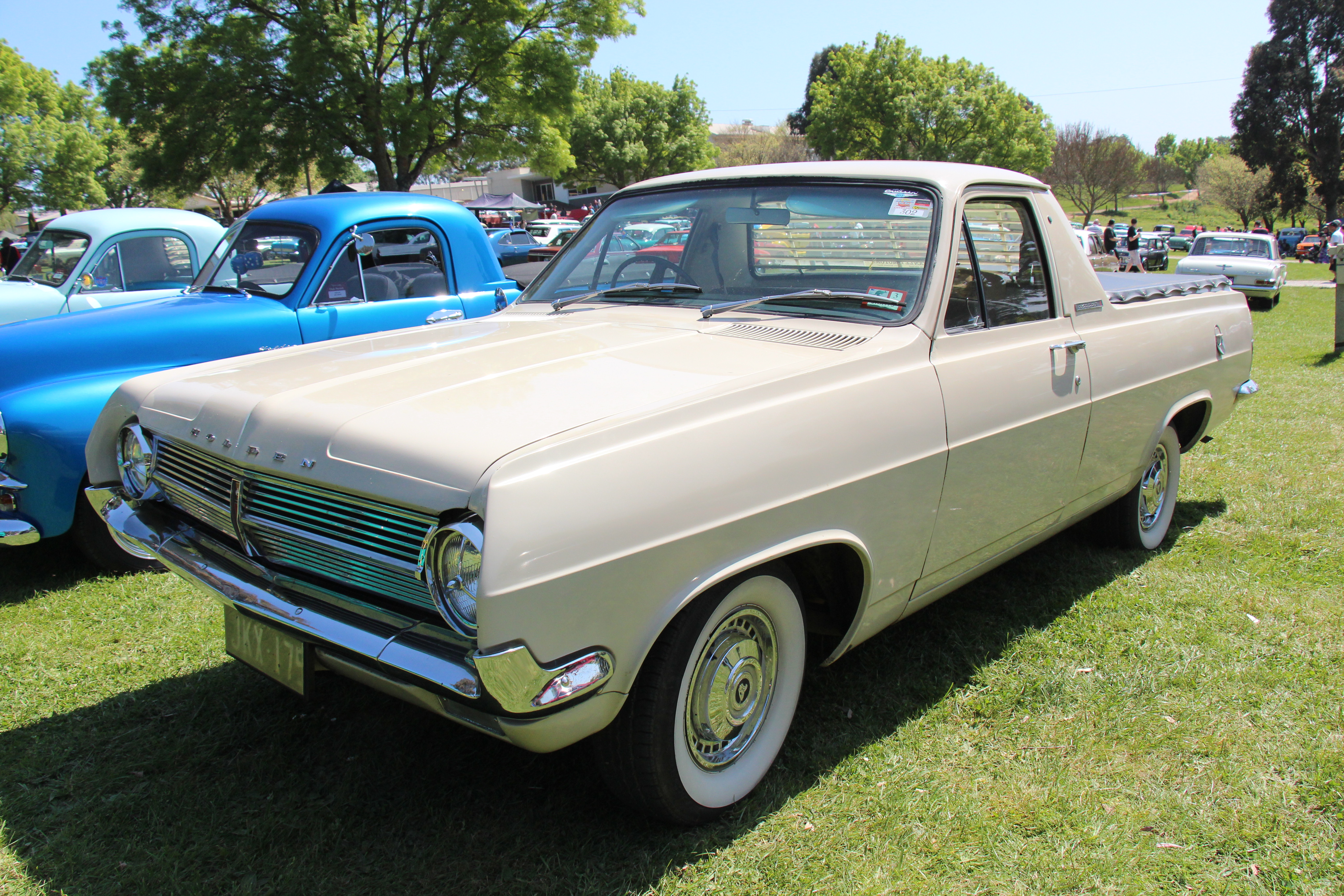
Holden Utility

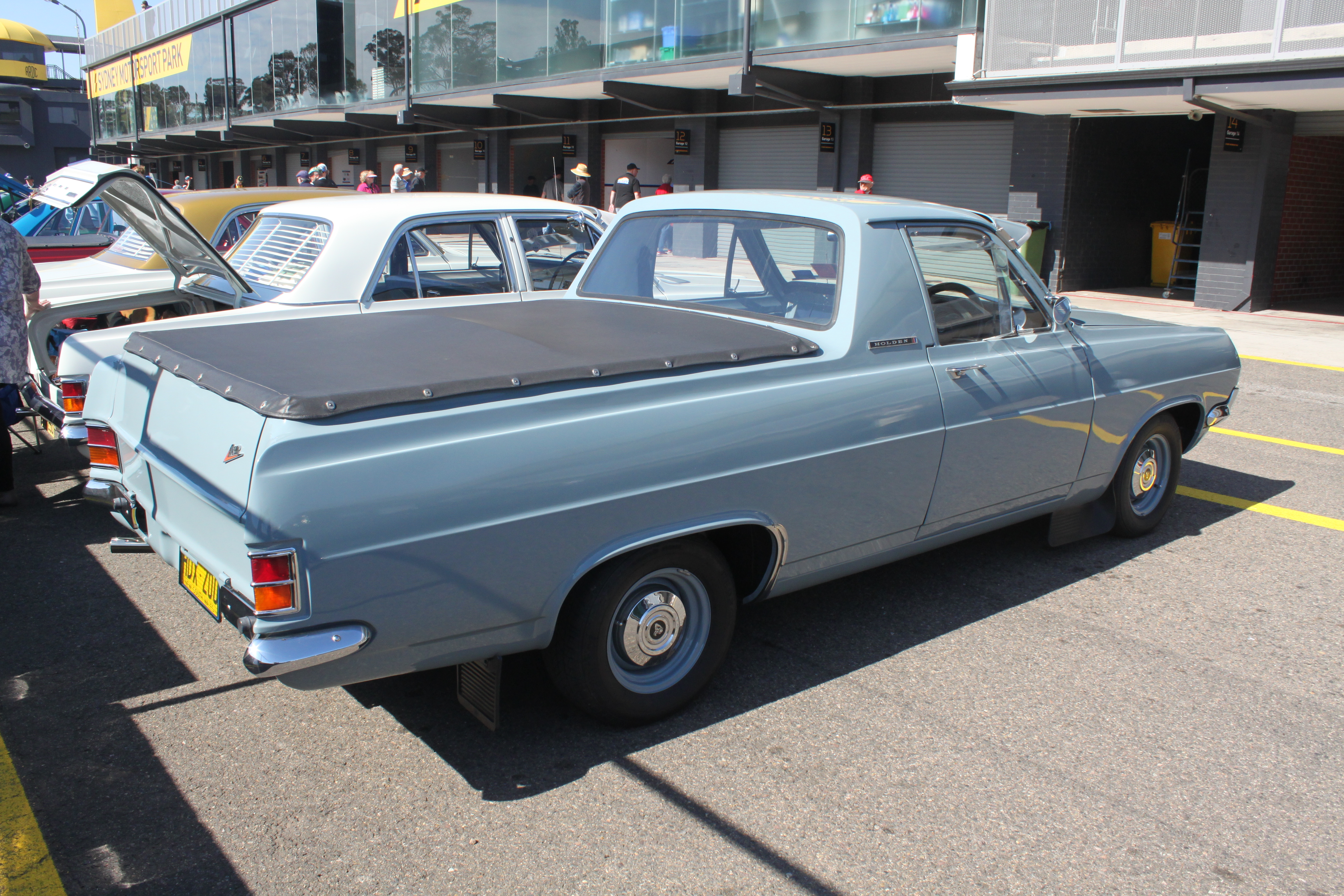
Holden Utility

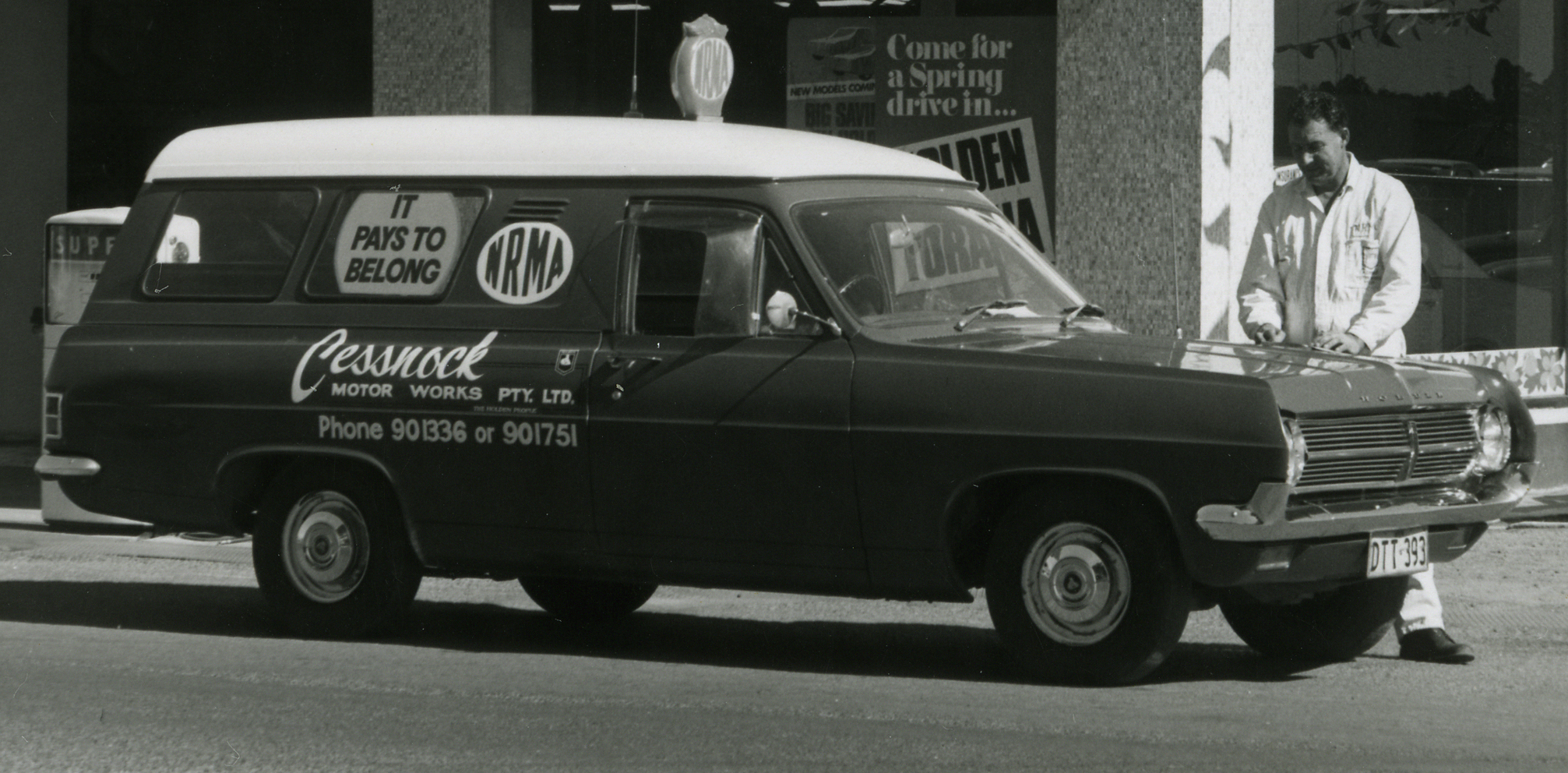
Holden Panel Van

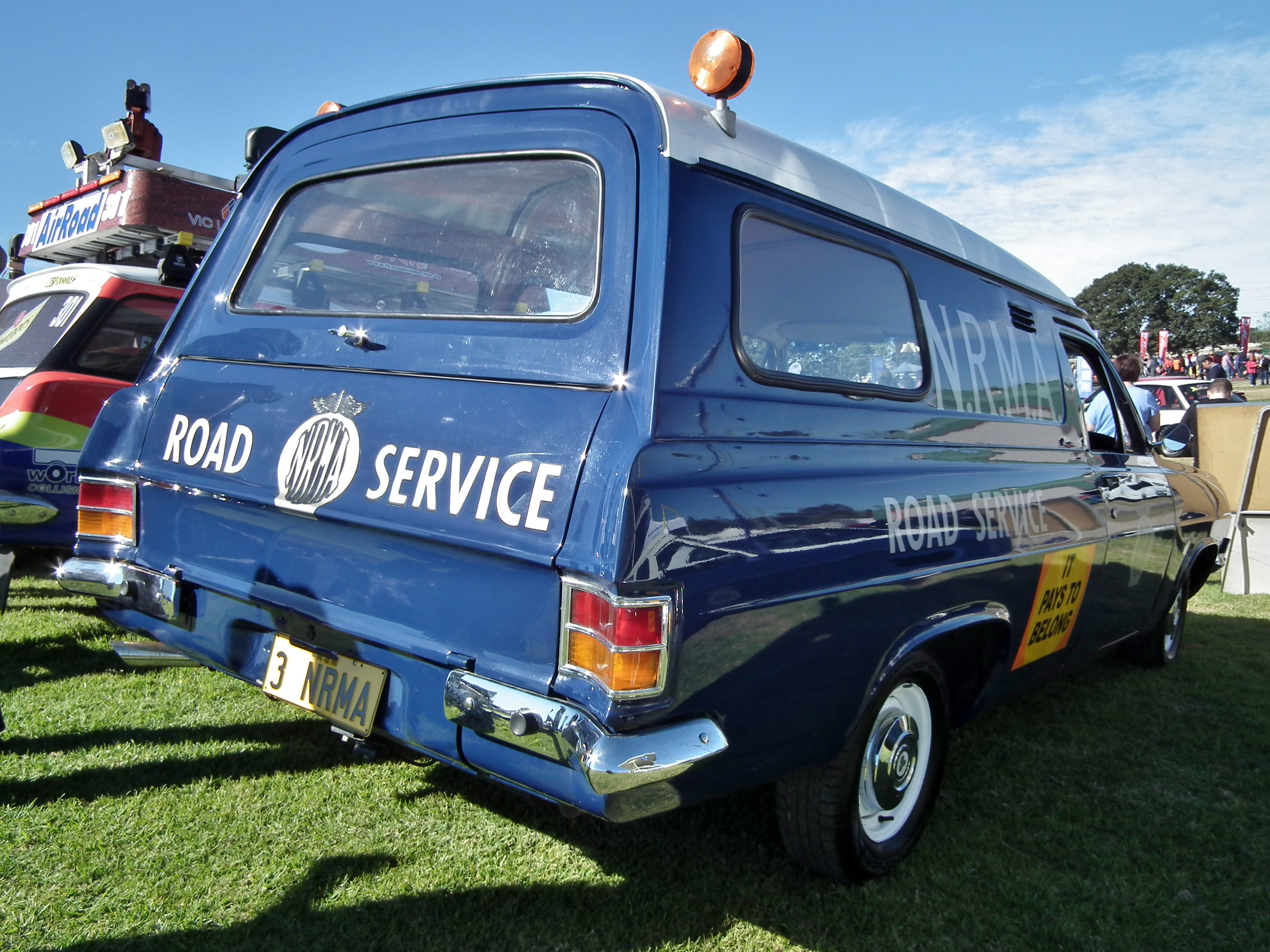
NRMA Holden Panel Van

== Engines and transmissions ==
Three versions of the inline six cylinder Holden Red motor were available. The 100 bhp 149 cu in (2.4 L) six was standard in all models except the Premiers and a 115 bhp 179 cu in (2.9 L) six was standard on Premiers and optional on all other models. A 140 bhp "X2" version of the "179" was also available as an option on all models. The "X2" featured twin carburettors, a high-lift camshaft, new inlet and exhaust manifolds and a low-restriction exhaust system. It also included a special instrument cluster and external "X2" badges. A three speed manual transmission was standard on all models with a two speed "Powerglide" automatic gearbox available as an option.

A 194 cu in (3.2 L) Chevrolet six was fitted for the South African market.

== Production and replacement ==
A total of 178,927 vehicles were produced up to April 1966 when the HD was replaced by the Holden HR series.
