= Flader J55 =

- Type: Turbojet
- National origin: United States
- Manufacturer: Fredric Flader Inc
- First run: 1948

The Flader J55, also known as the 124 within the company, was a small turbojet engine notable for its use of a supersonic axial-flow compressor. Development started at Fredric Flader Inc. in 1947, with the first examples being delivered in 1949. However, these delivered far lower power than predicted. Improved models followed in early 1952 that met the performance requirements, but demonstrated very poor reliability. When small engines from other companies became available, the J55 project was cancelled in 1952.

== History ==
=== Supersonic compressors ===
An axial compressor consists of a series of propeller-like disks known as "stages", each of which compresses the incoming air in turn. As the air is compressed its volume decreases, so each stage has less diameter than the one before it.

In a normal turbojet, the compressors rotational speeds are limited so that the outer tips of the blades remain subsonic. If all of the stages are powered off of a common shaft, this means that the limiting rotational speed will be defined by the first stage, which is the largest. Stages further in will be operating with tip speeds that are much lower, which works against the general principle that faster rotational speeds are more efficient. Larger engines, like those on modern airliners, normally include two or three "spools", sections of the engine operating at different rotational speeds, allowing each section of the compressor to reach the highest RPM possible while remaining subsonic.

Additionally, in order for an aircraft to operate at supersonic airspeeds, aircraft normally use a series of ramps or cones to create shock waves that progressively slow the air to subsonic speeds before it reaches the compressor. These intakes create drag that must be overcome by the engines.

A compressor that works at supersonic speeds would thus have improved performance, at least in theory. This would allow it to operate at higher rotational speeds, as well as reducing or eliminating the need for the complex inlets. During the early days of engine development, supersonic aerodynamics were not well understood, and it was not clear whether such an engine would be more or less efficient than a conventional design.

In order to find out, between 1946 and 1948 engineers at the NACA Lewis Research Center carried out an early research program on supersonic compressor stages. These demonstrated very encouraging results; not only did such a design work, but the compression ratio across a single stage was much higher than in a subsonic design, as much as two times. This would allow an engine with a given overall pressure ratio to be built with fewer stages, making it smaller, lighter and less complex.

=== Flader proposal ===
Fredric Flader Inc. was formed in 1944 to develop small turbine engines, initially based on a contract with the US Army Air Force for a 5,900 shp (4,400 kW) turboprop, the T33-FF-1. Flader opened a new plant in Tonawanda, New York to develop the engine, but the Army cancelled the project shortly after. The company was saved by a US Navy contract for an 8-inch-diameter (200 mm) turbine for emergency power on small ships, but this contract was later won by Solar Turbines and work at Flader ended.

In 1946 the Army started developing the requirements for a series of three unmanned aircraft, one of which was a high-speed radio controlled target drone, the XQ-2. Ryan Aeronautical won the contract with their Firebee design, and on 7 February 1947 the Power Plant Laboratory at the Wright Air Development Center issued a tender for a small engine to power the Ryan airframe. Flader's proposal, from 26 April 1947, proposed using a supersonic compressor in order to build a small engine suitable for the design. They predicted that the compressor would have a pressure ratio about 2.75, roughly twice that of conventional designs. This was enough that only a single centrifugal-flow compressor was needed to complete the compression cycle of the engine.

In spite of the risks involved, Flader's proposal won the tender and development started two months later.

=== Early testing ===
Flader worked in close concert with the engineers at Lewis. They sent an early version of the compressor to them for testing in June 1948, which demonstrated performance far below the predicted value. Worse, contrary to expectations, the performance decreased with increasing rotational speed, the opposite of what Lewis's earlier research had suggested, which was one of the biggest reasons for using the design. This was later attributed to a thick boundary layer on the blades. Additionally, after about 35 hours of running time the leading edges of the compressor blades were found to be curled over, apparently due to extremely high aerodynamic loads.

In mid-1949 Flader delivered two derated engines, XJ55-FF-1's, to the Air Force for testing. These delivered only 450 lbf (2,000 N) of thrust, far below what was needed to power the Firebee. However, Flader continued working on the design, and it had greatly improved by late 1951. In January 1952 they delivered one of these improved models and on 24 January it ran at 700 lbf (3,100 N), meeting the requirements. However, during a second test on 31 January the engine failed shortly after running for one minute at 700 lbf (3,100 N).

Although it appeared that the basic design was able to deliver its promised performance, at that point it was far from a complete design. Weight and fuel consumption were both above the design estimates, the various support systems like fuel and oil pumps were not self-contained, and it remained susceptible to compressor surging. Flader estimated that these problems would require another three years of development to fix.

=== Cancellation ===
At that point, two new small engines with roughly the required power had come to market, the Fairchild J44 and the Continental J69, a licensed version of the French Turbomeca Marboré. The Air Force decided to use the J69 in the Firebee, and cancelled development of the J55 shortly after.

Flader made several other one-off designs, but found no lasting work in the field and eventually sublet their plants to Eaton Manufacturing in 1955. Eaton moved on, and Flader was wound down on 2 September 1957.

== Description ==
The J55 looked like a conventional axial-flow engine overall, but the equipment section was located in front of the engine in an oversized spinner area. Behind the spinner was the intake area and the supersonic compressor stage. Behind this was the single centrifugal stage, in a separate cylindrical section. This was followed by a canular combustion area and then a single turbine stage.

== Specifications (J55-FF-1 Lieutenant 124) ==
Data from Aircraft Engines of the World 1949, Jane's All the World's Aircraft 1949-50, Flight 11 May 1951

==== General characteristics ====
- Type: axial-flow turbojet engine
- Length: 79 in (2,007 mm)
- Diameter: 15.7 in (399 mm)
- Dry weight: 300 lb (136 kg)

==== Components ====
- Compressor: multi-stage axial supersonic flow compressor
- Combustors: stainless steel annular combustion chamber with 16 fuel injectors
- Turbine: 1-stage axial flow turbine
- Fuel type: Kerosene (JP-1)
- Oil system: Pressure system fed by a modified turbo-charger oil pump at 40 psi (280 kPa) scavenged by 2 pumps

==== Performance ====
- Maximum thrust: 770 lbf (3,400 N) at 28,600 rpm for take-off

700 lbf (3,100 N) at 26,800 rpm at sea level maximum continuous / cruise
350 lbf (1,600 N) at 19,800 rpm idle

- Overall pressure ratio: 2.85:1
- Air mass flow: 15 lb/s (410 kg/min)
- Turbine inlet temperature: 1,250 °F (677 °C)
- Specific fuel consumption: 1.65 lb/lbf/h (0.047 kg/N/ks) cruise
- Thrust-to-weight ratio: 2.56 lbf/lb (25.1 N/kg)
