= Holden HT =

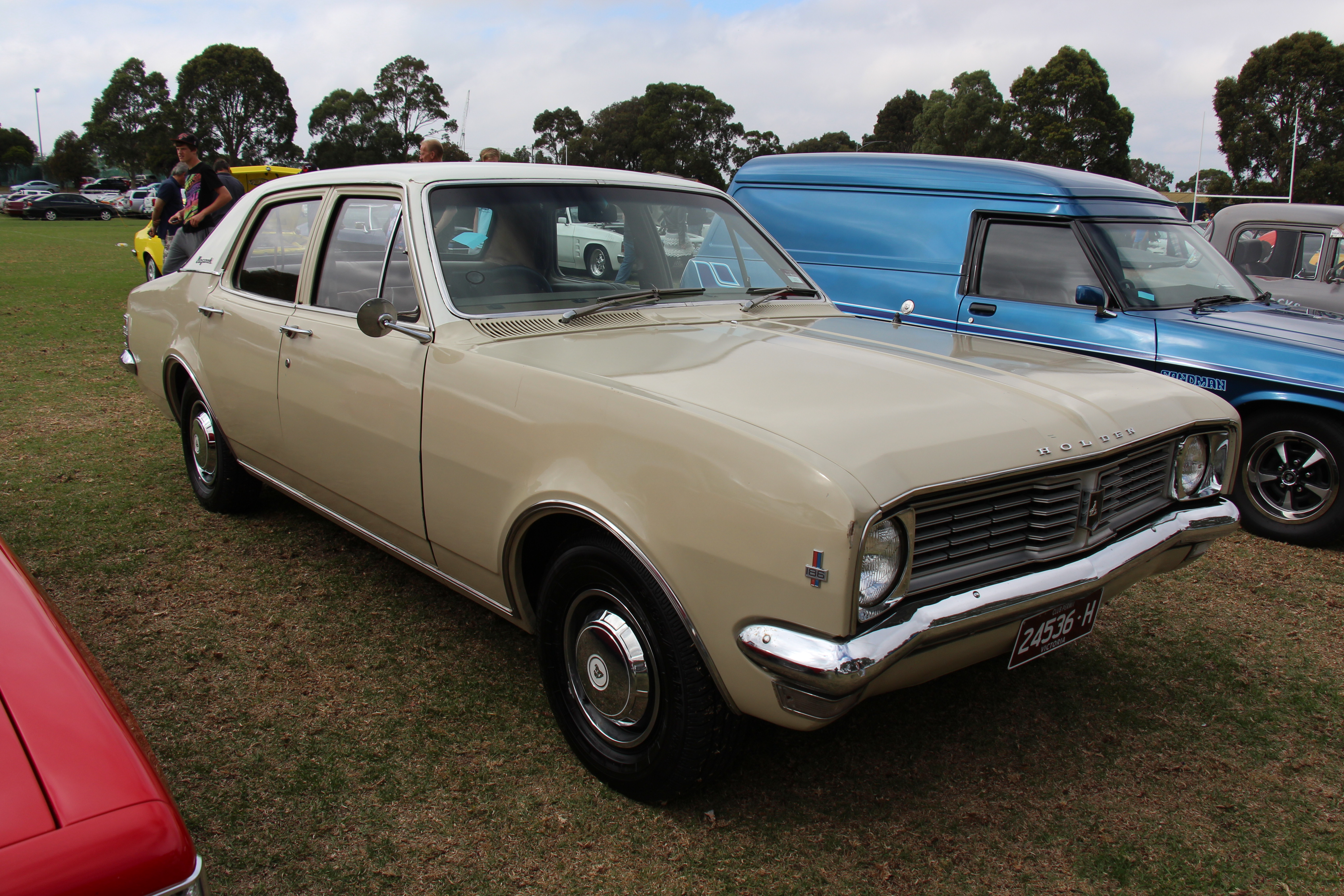
- Holden Kingswood sedan

Overview
- Manufacturer: Holden
- Also called: Holden Belmont; Holden Kingswood; Holden Premier; Holden Brougham; Holden Monaro; Chevrolet El Camino (South Africa)
- Production: May 1969–July 1970
- Designer: Peter Nankervis

Body and chassis
- Class: Mid-size
- Body style: 4-door sedan 5-door station wagon 2-door coupé 2-door coupé utility 2-door panel van
- Layout: FR layout

Powertrain
- Engine: 2.6L GMH '161' I6; 3.0L GMH '186' I6; 4.1L GMH '253' V8; 5.0L 'Chevrolet 307' V8; 5.0L GMH '308' V8; 5.7L 'Chevrolet 350' V8
- Transmission: 3spd manual 4spd manual 2spd "Powerglide" automatic

Dimensions
- Wheelbase: 111.0 inches (2819 mm)
- Length: sedans: 184.8 inches (4694 mm)
- Width: 71.8 inches (1824 mm)
- Height: sedans: 55.6 inches (1412 mm)
- Curb weight: Belmont: 2814 lb (1276 kg)

Chronology
- Predecessor: Holden HK
- Successor: Holden HG

The Holden HT series is a range of automobiles which was manufactured by Holden in Australia from May 1969 until July 1970.

== Introduction ==
Holden HT Belmont, Kingswood and Premier models were introduced in May 1969, replacing their Holden HK series equivalents which had been in production since 1968. HT Brougham and Monaro models followed in June 1969. Noticeable changes from the HK series included new grilles, new taillights, flatter rear flanks and a wider back window. Other changes included increased track width, revised suspension, a new instrument panel and synchromesh on all forward gears on manual gearbox models.

== Model range ==
The mainstream HT series was offered in four-door sedan and five-door station wagon body styles in three trim levels

- Belmont sedan
- Belmont wagon
- Kingswood sedan
- Kingswood wagon
- Premier sedan
- Premier wagon

The Brougham, which used a body with an extended boot, was available in one model only.

- Brougham sedan

The Monaro was offered in three two-door coupe models

- Monaro coupe
- Monaro GTS coupe
- Monaro GTS 350 coupe

Commercial vehicle derivatives were available in two-door coupe utility and two-door panel van body styles in two trim levels.

- Belmont utility
- Belmont panel van
- Kingswood utility
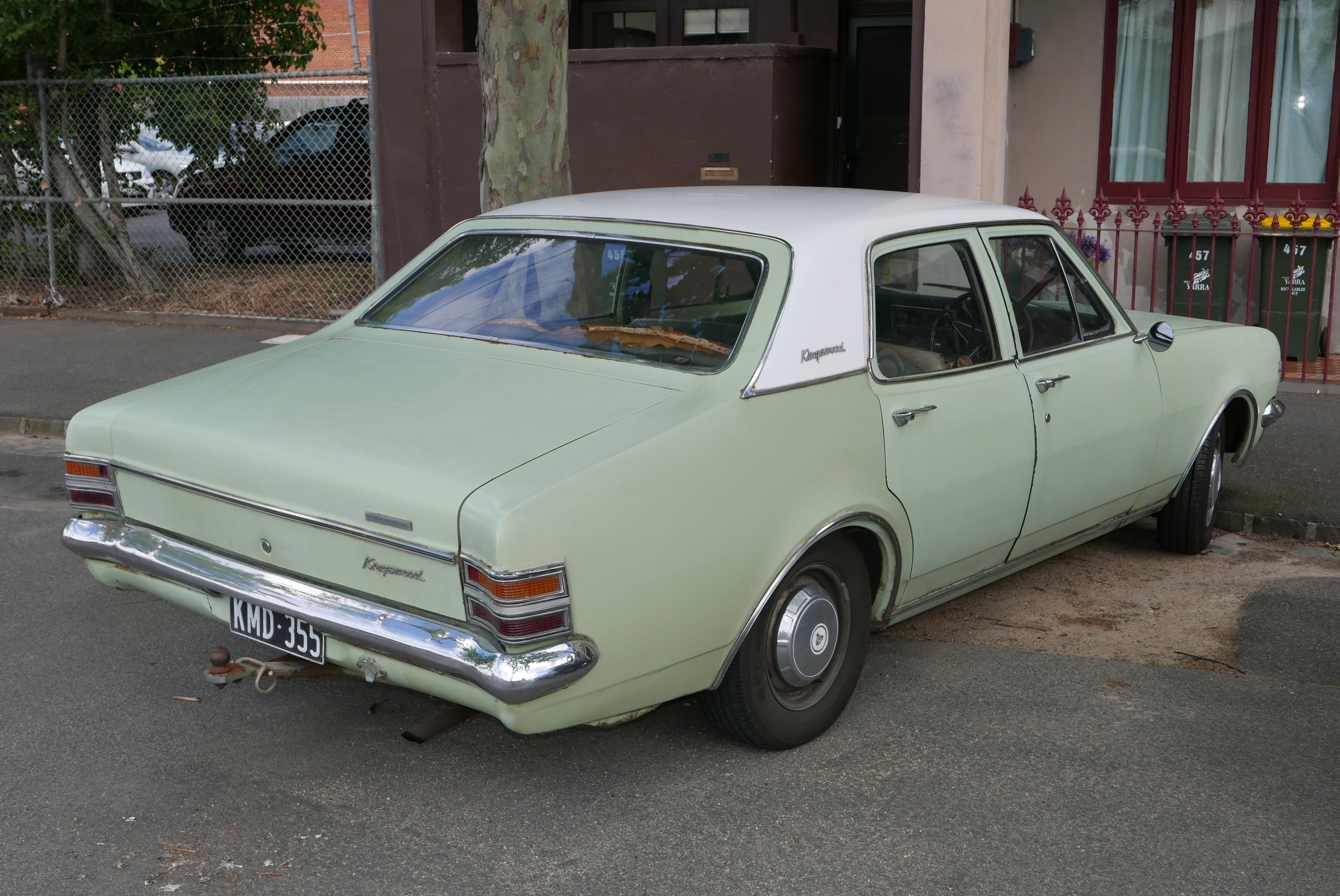
Holden Kingswood sedan

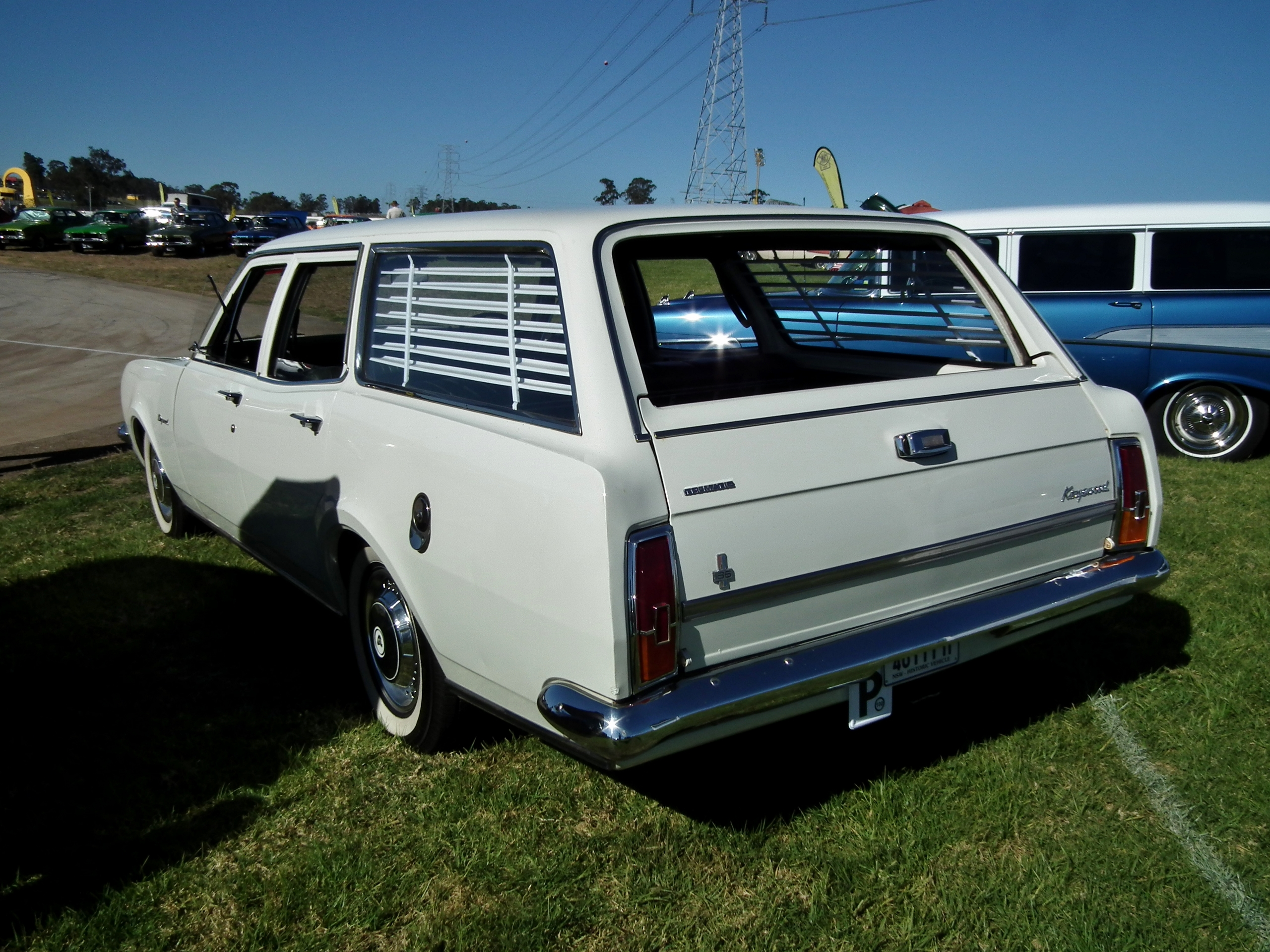
Holden Kingswood wagon

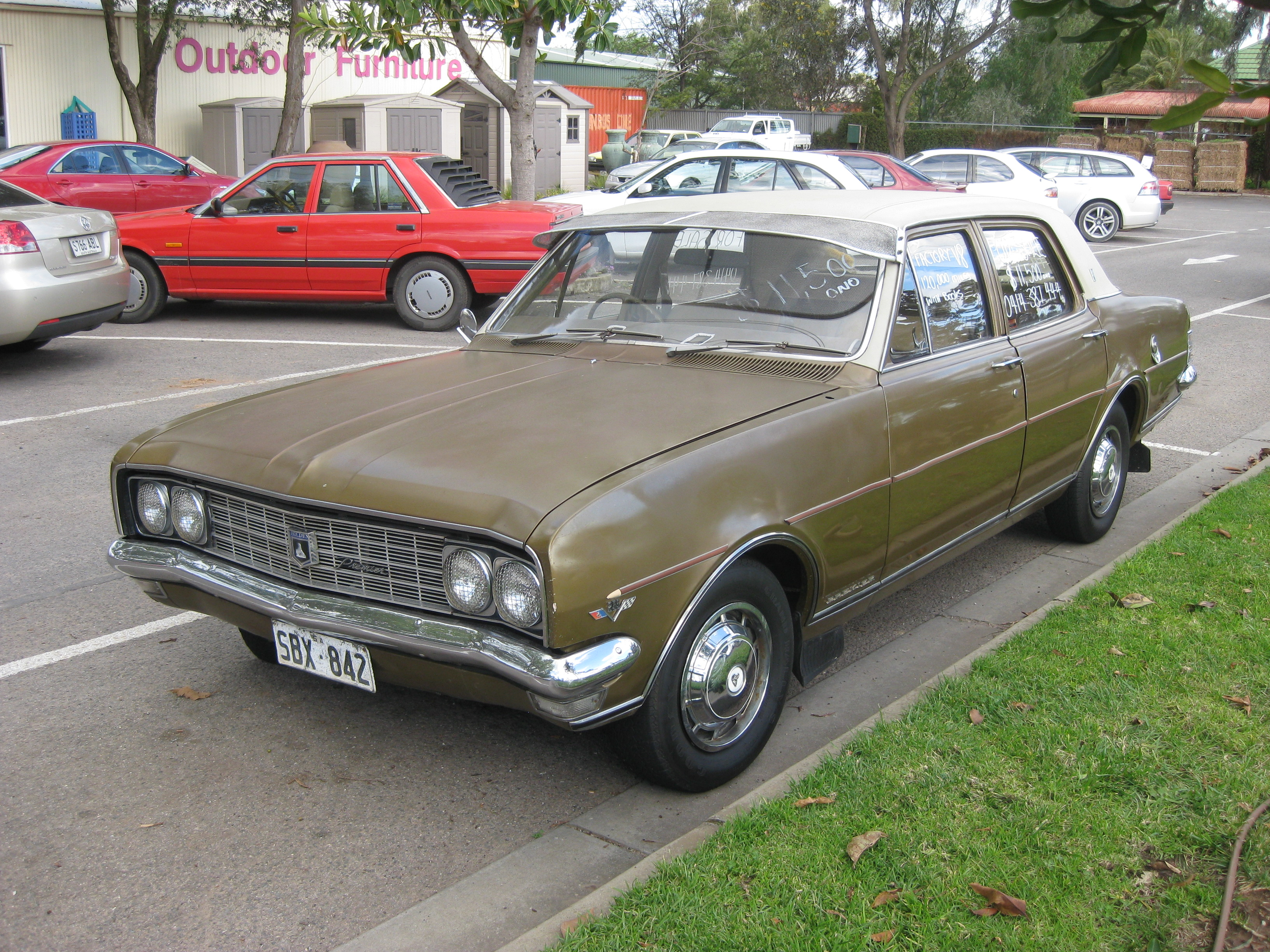
Holden Premier sedan

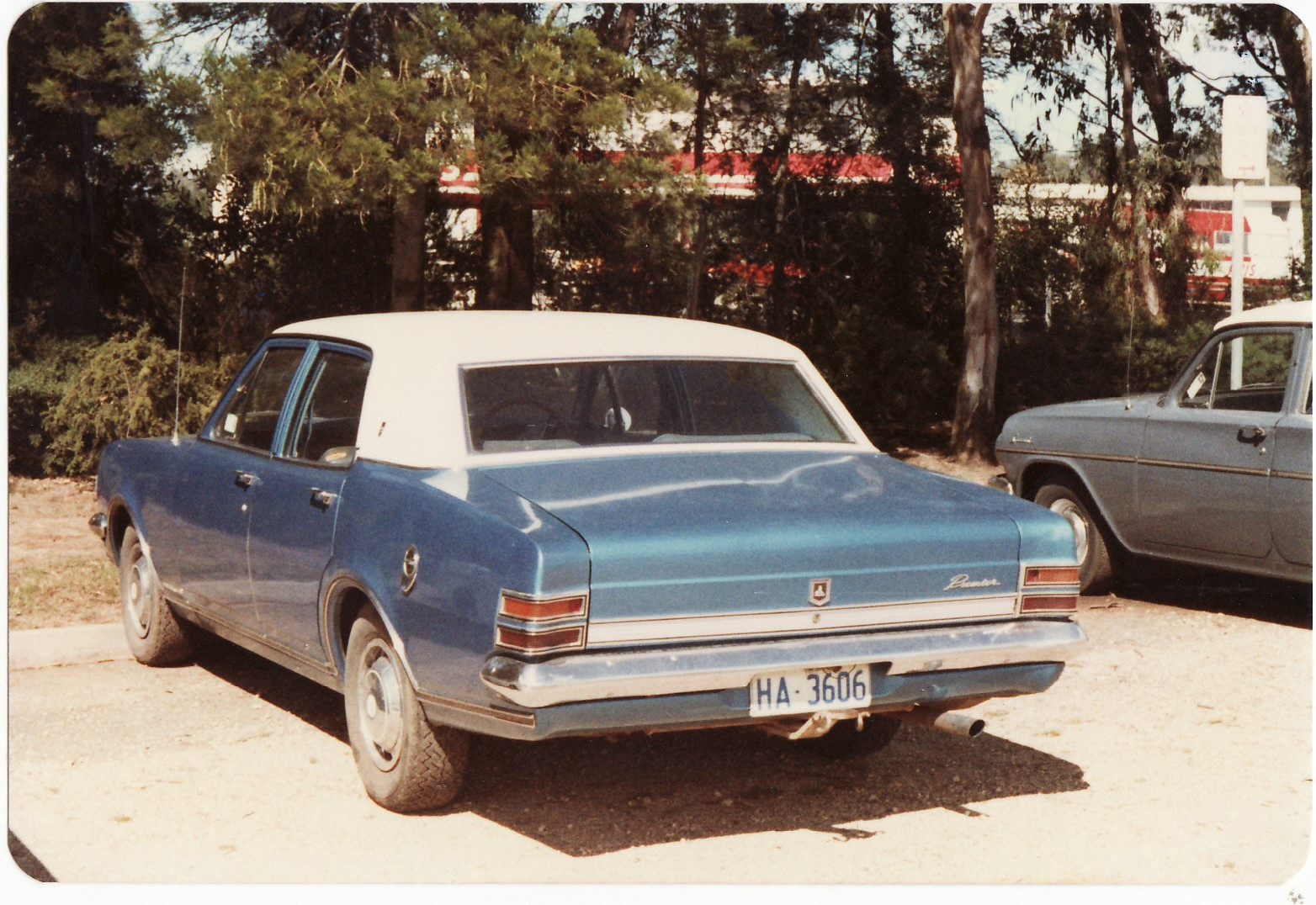
Holden Premier sedan

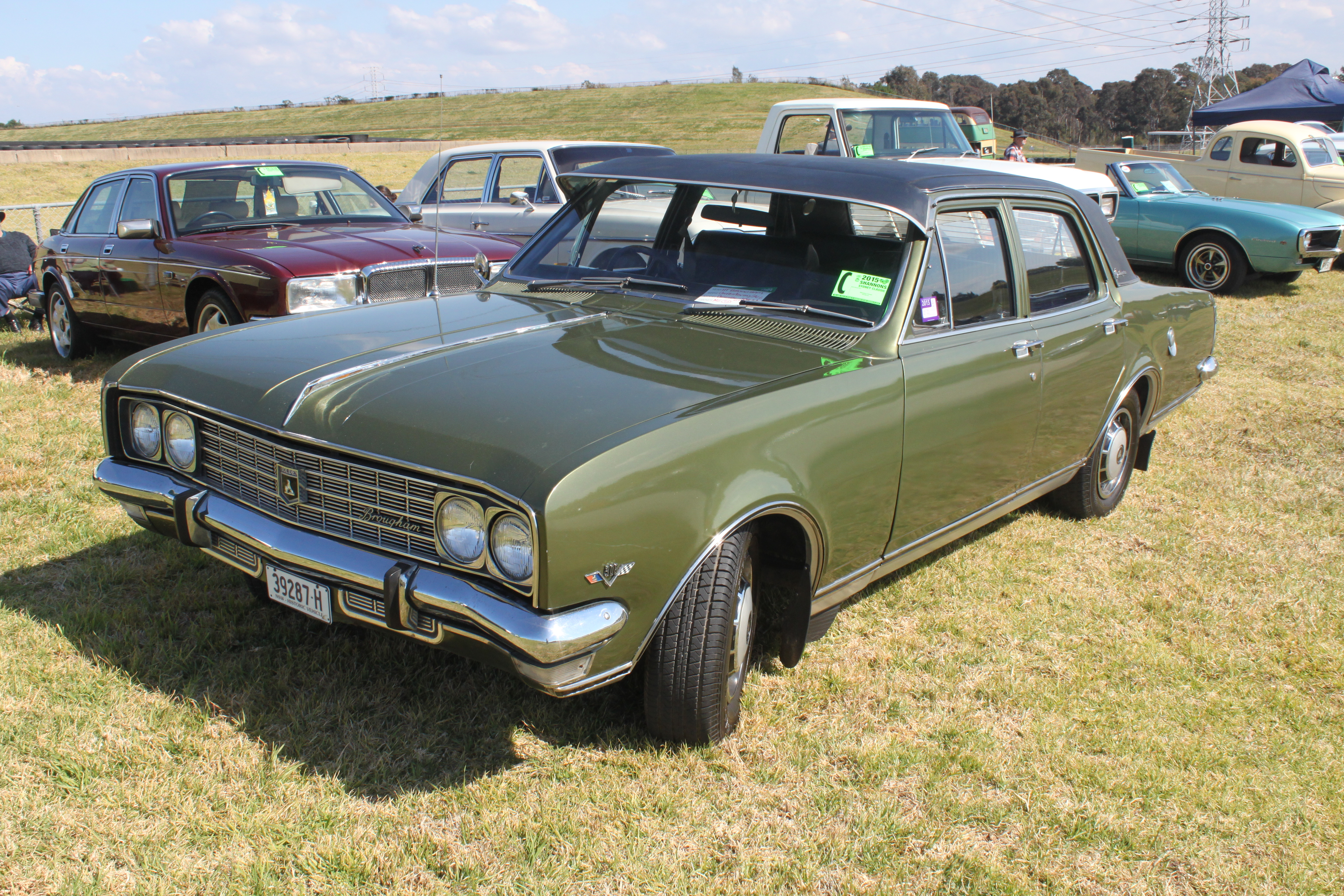
Holden Brougham sedan

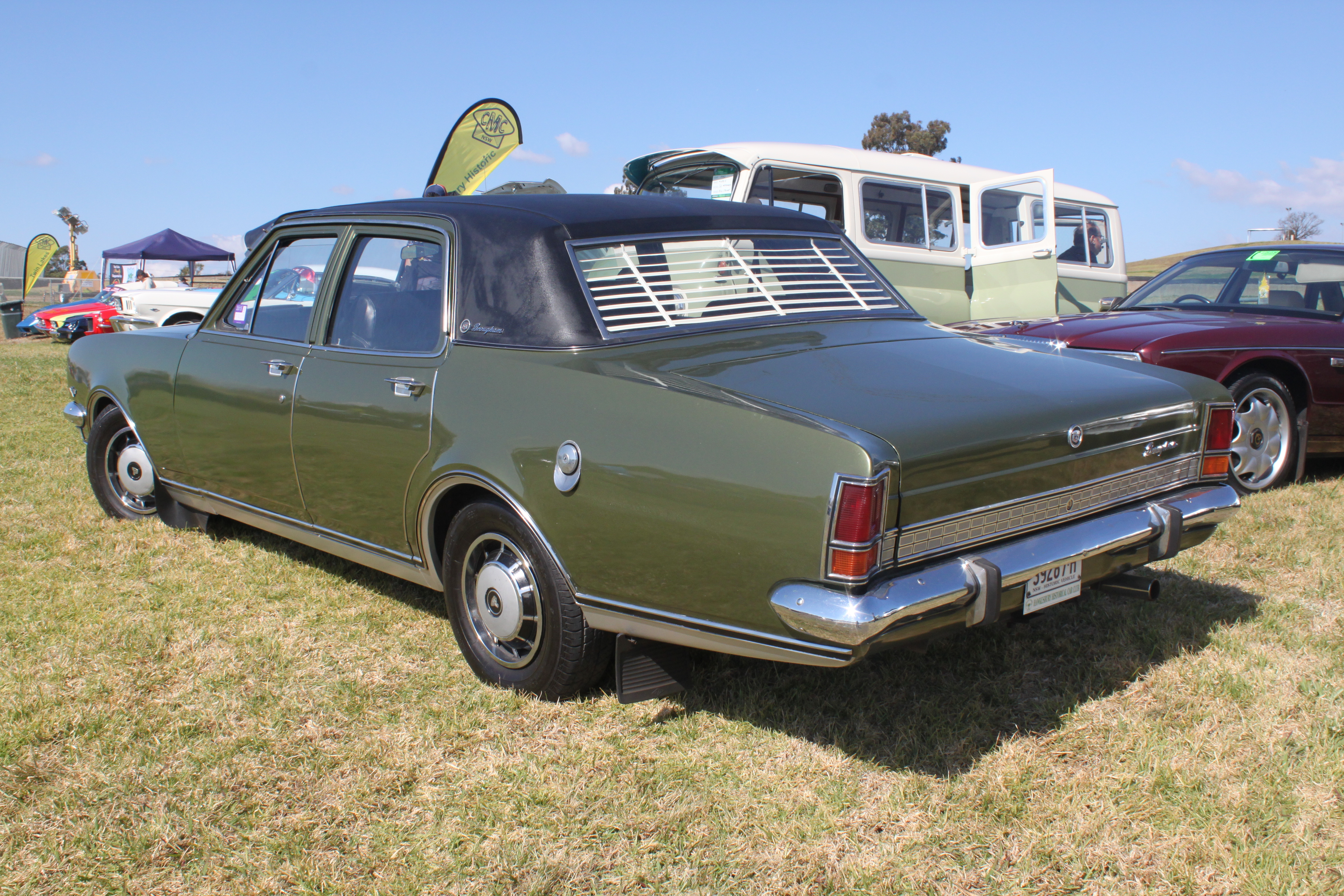
Holden Brougham sedan

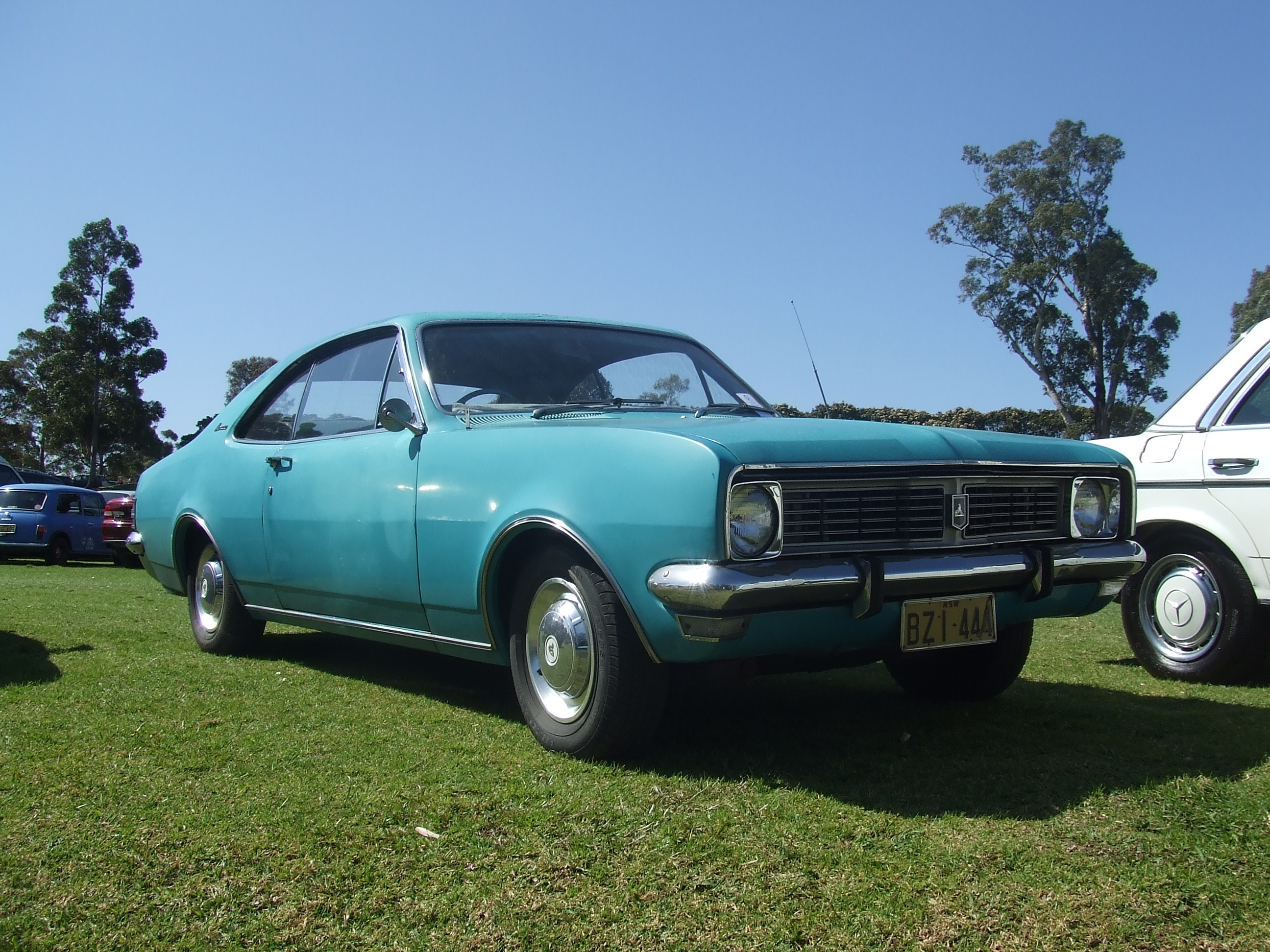
Holden Monaro

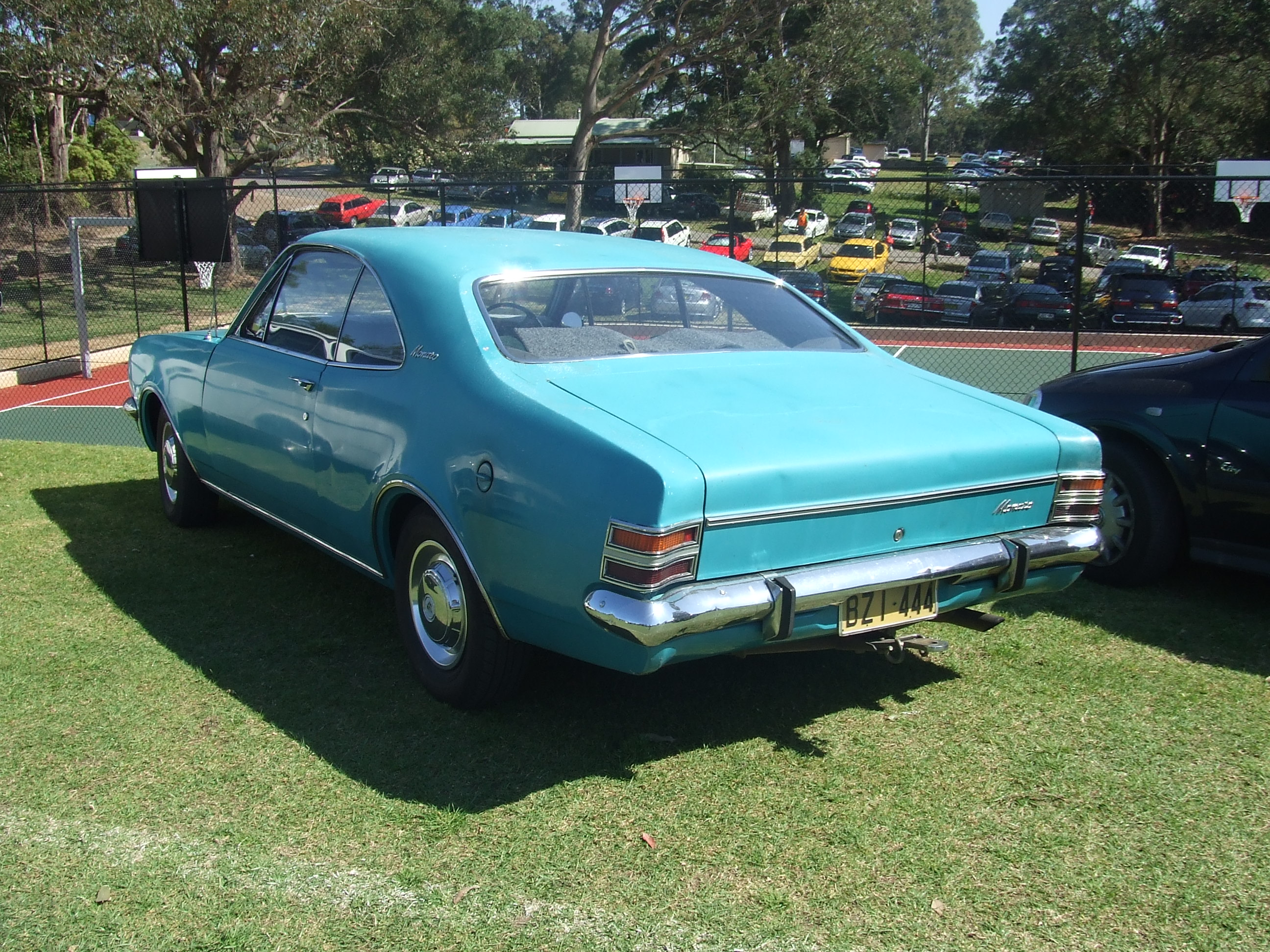
Holden Monaro

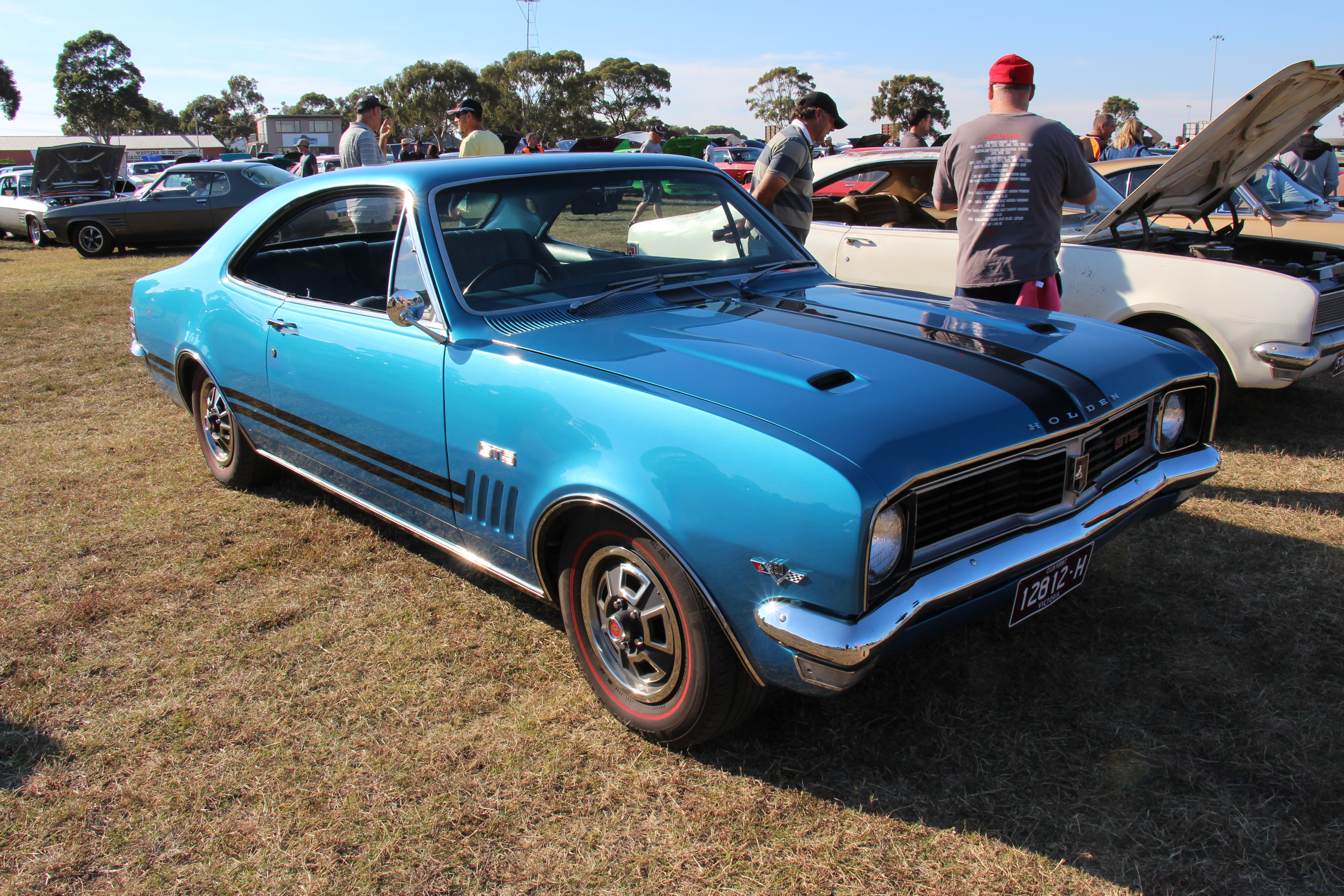
Holden Monaro GTS

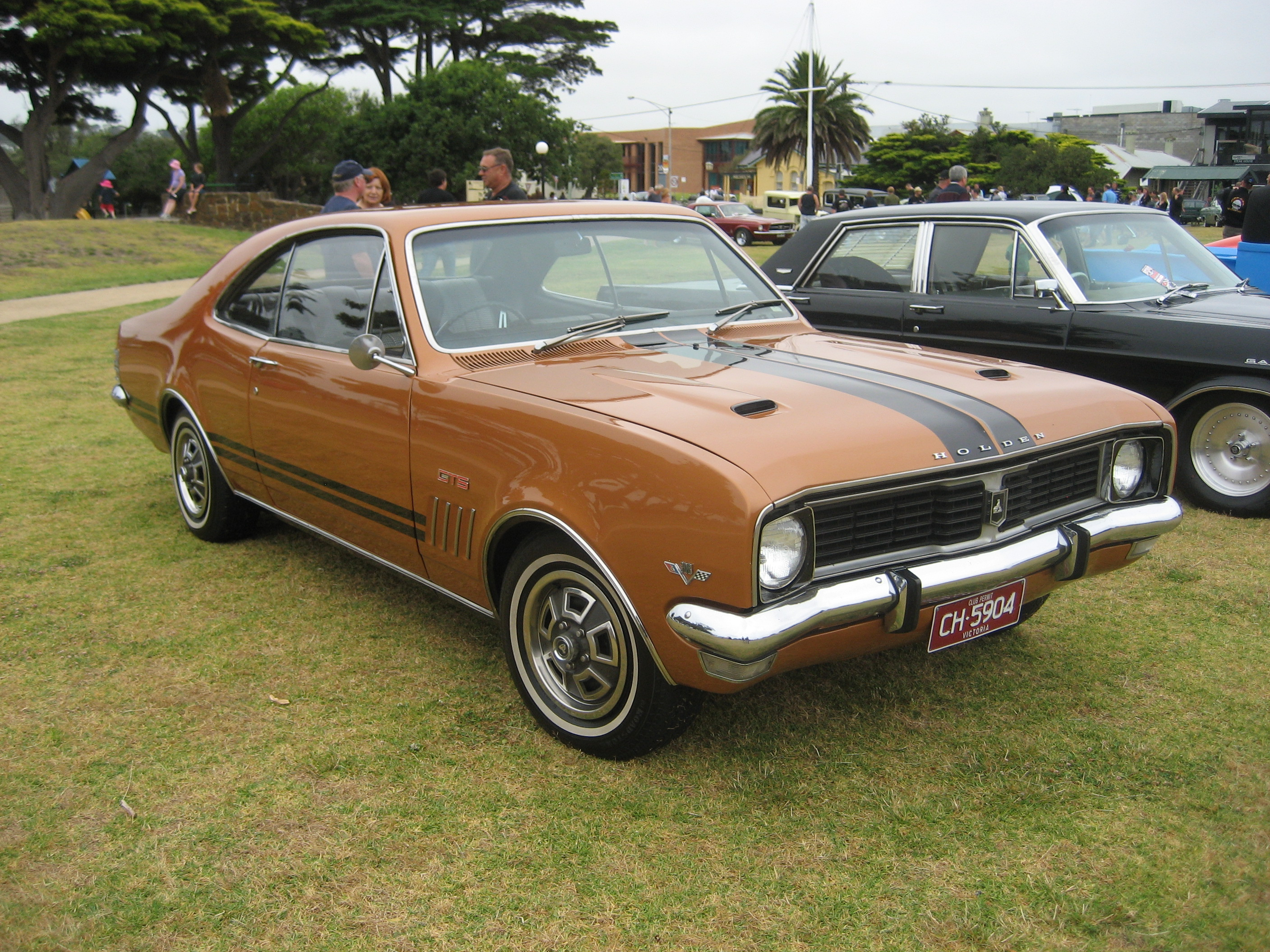
Holden Monaro GTS 350

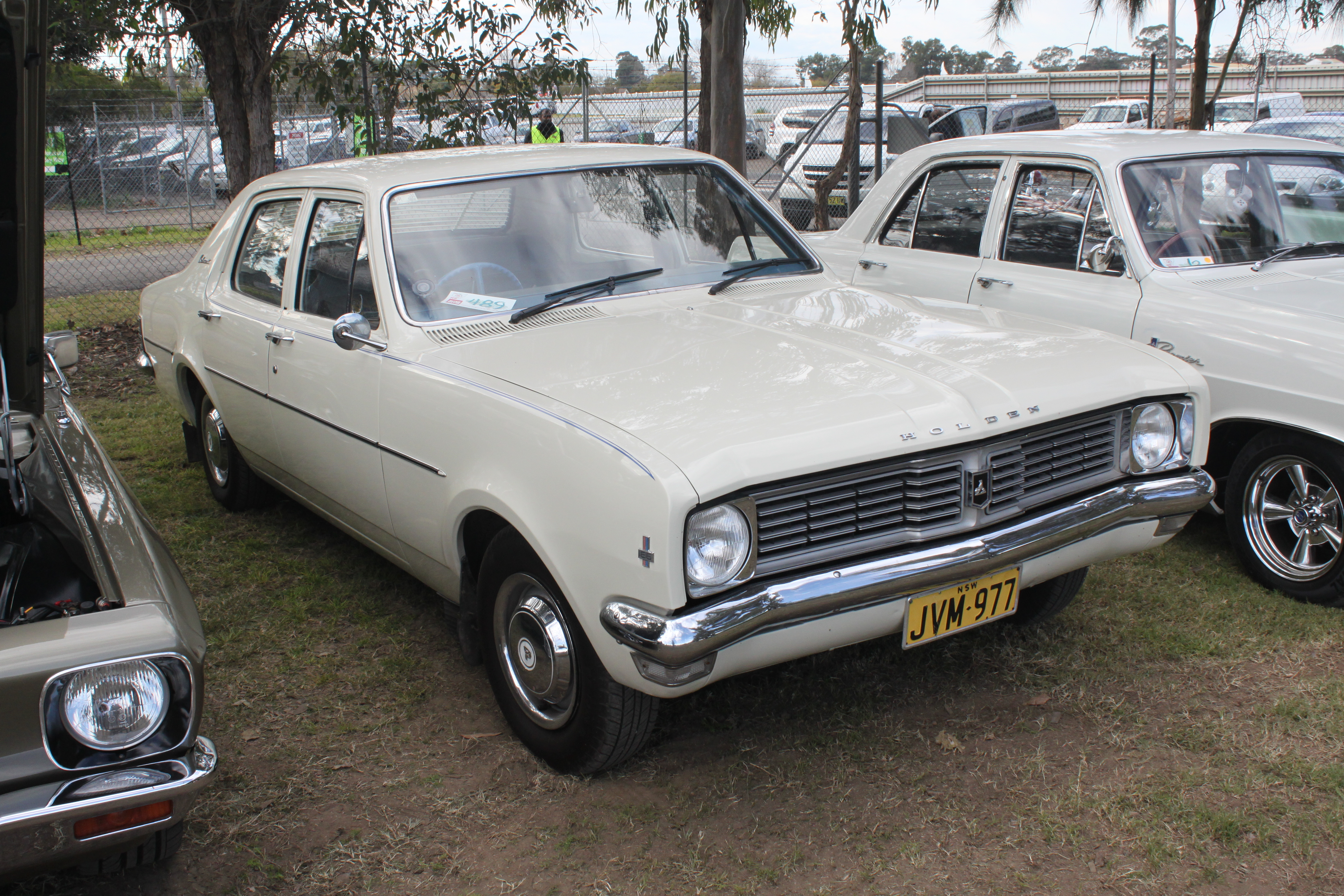
Holden Belmont sedan

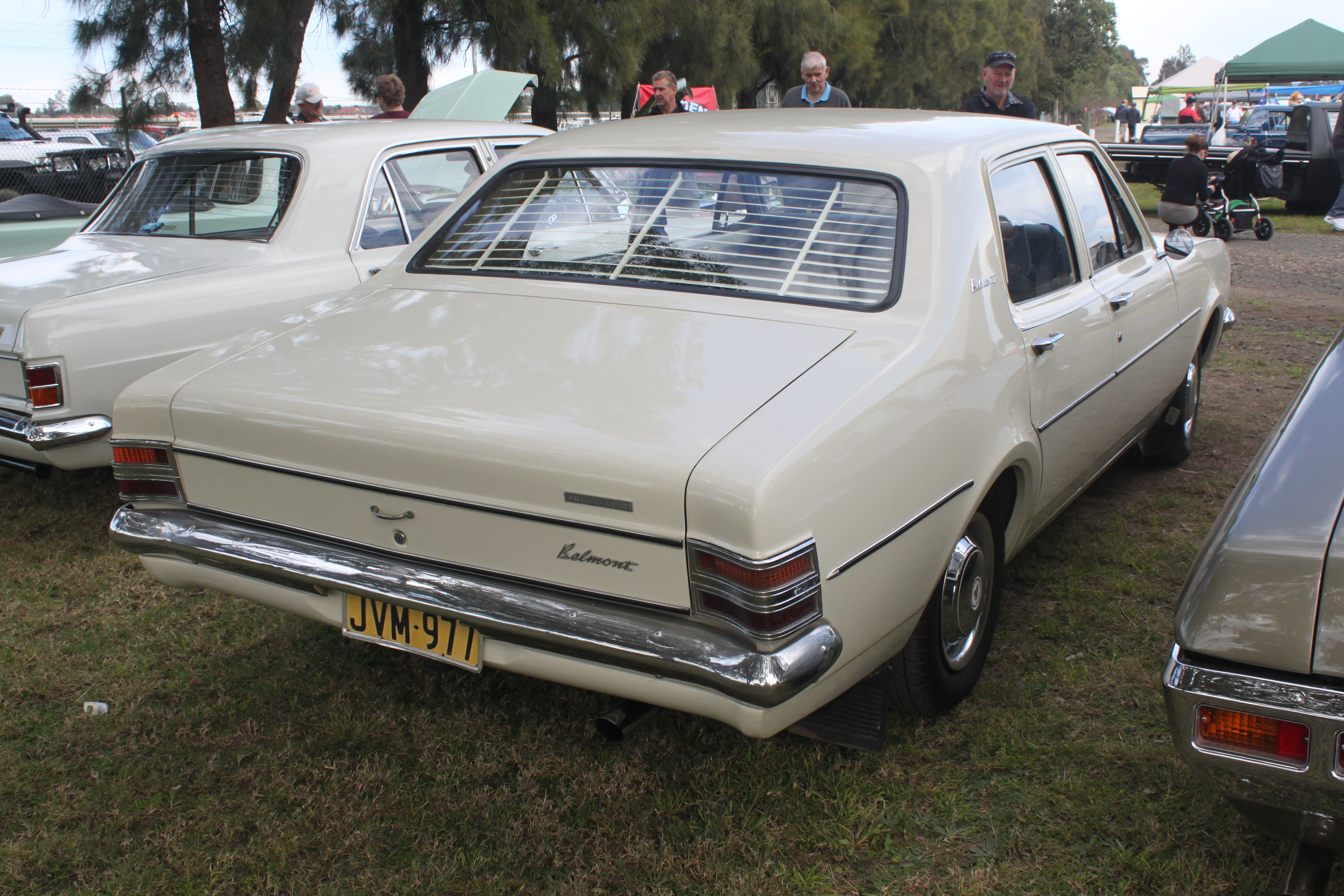
Holden Belmont sedan

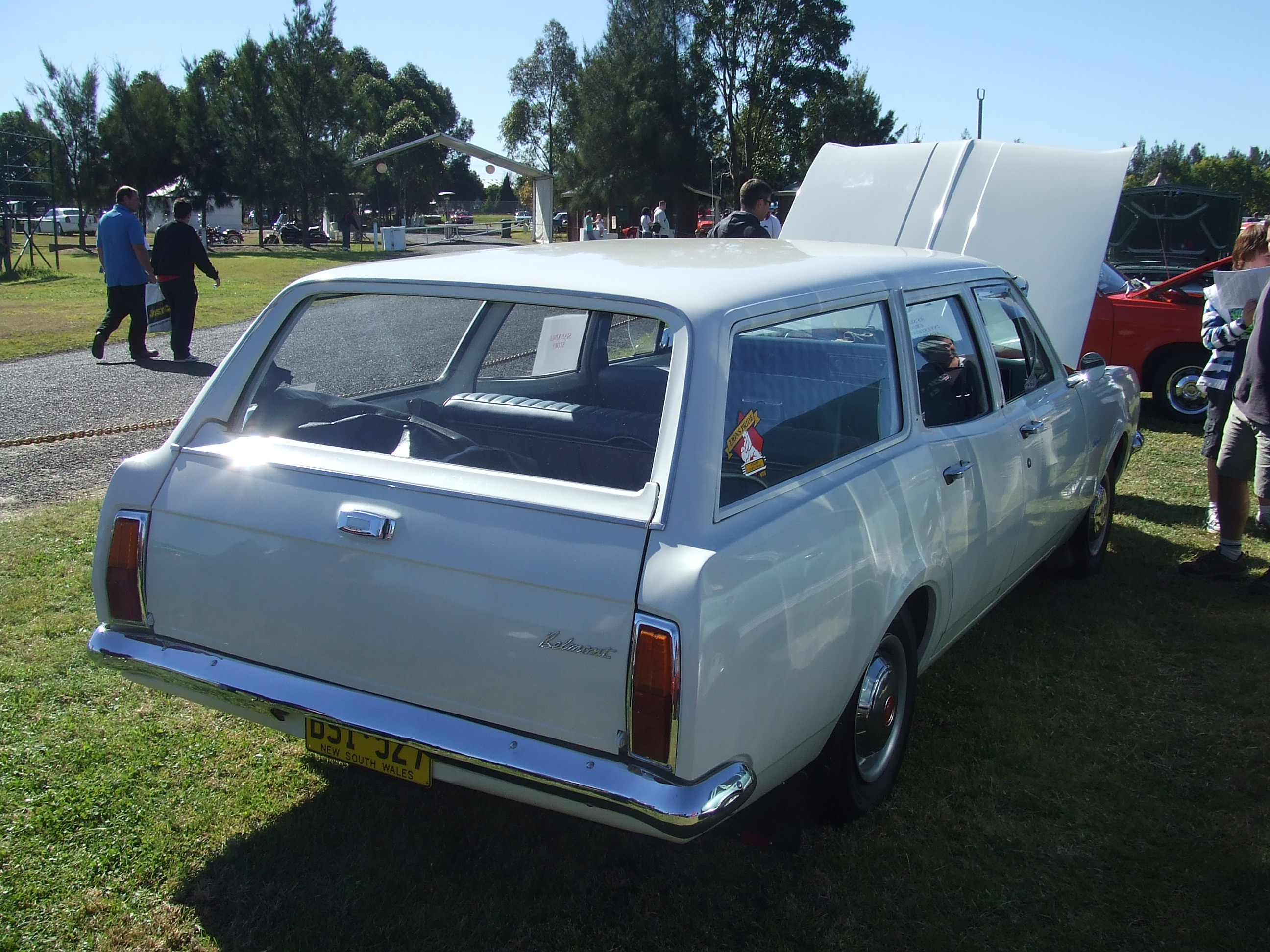
Holden Belmont wagon

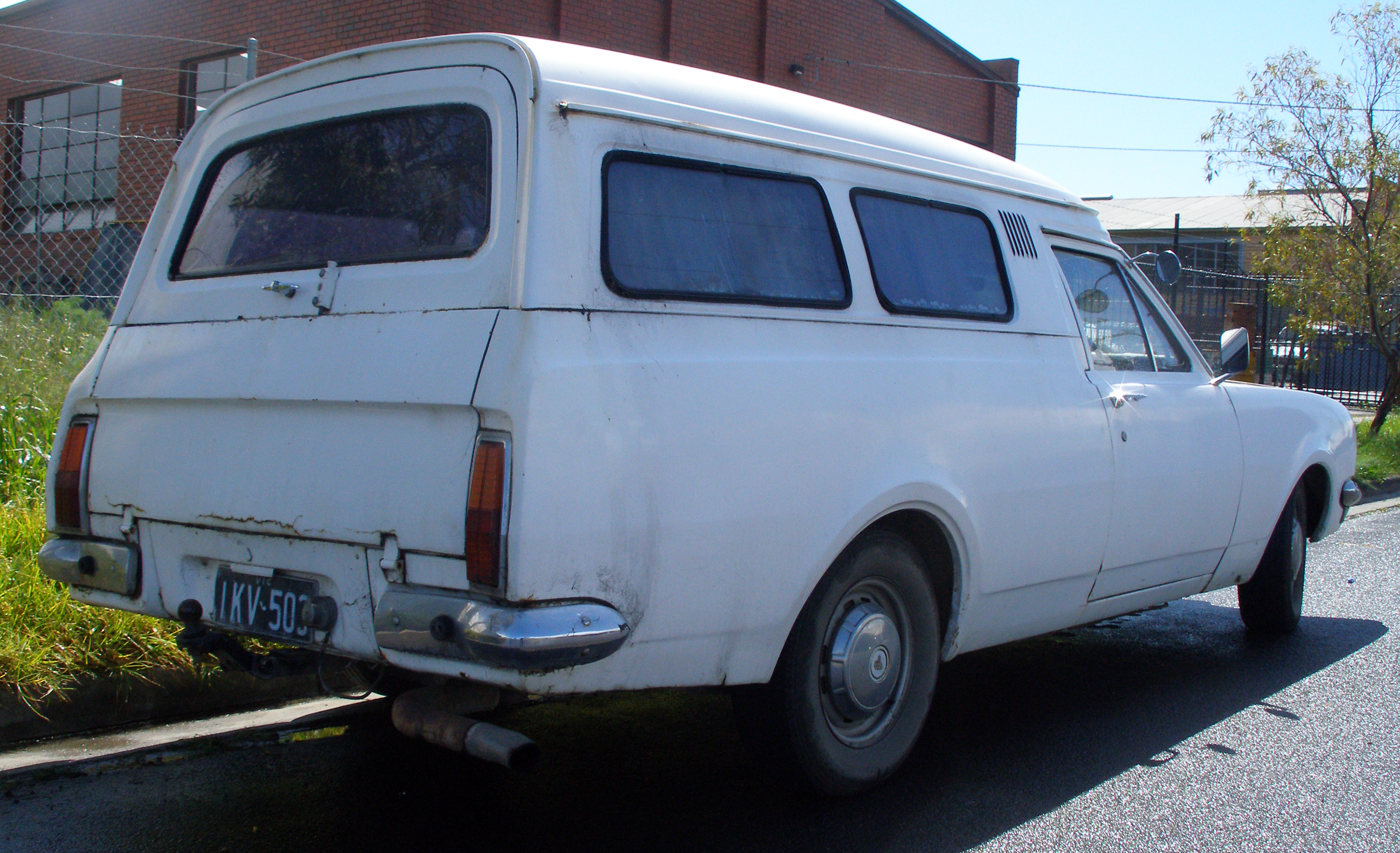
Holden Belmont panel van

== Engines and transmissions ==
The 161-cubic-inch (2.6-litre) and 186-cubic-inch (3.0-litre) six-cylinder engines were carried over from the HK range. Australian manufactured 253-cubic-inch (4.2-litre) and 308-cubic-inch (5.0-litre) V8 engines were new, replacing the imported 307-cubic-inch (5.0-litre) V8s. Initially the 308 was fitted to only the Brougham, and existing stocks of the imported 307 were used in other models. Once these supplies were exhausted, the 308 V8 was made available as an option across the HT range. The 327-cubic-inch (5.3-litre) Chevrolet V8 that had powered the HK Monaro GTS 327 was replaced by a 350-cubic-inch (5.7-litre) Chevrolet V8 in the newly introduced HT Monaro GTS 350 model. Three-speed manual, four-speed manual and two-speed "Powerglide" automatic transmissions were offered.

A smaller, 2,130 cc (130 cu in) version of Holden's inline-six Red motor ("130 HC") was available for export markets. It produced 90 hp (67 kW) at 4400 rpm and was meant for higher octane fuel.

== Production ==
The HT range was replaced by the Holden HG series in July 1970, production having totaled 183,402 units.

== Chevrolet El Camino (South Africa) ==
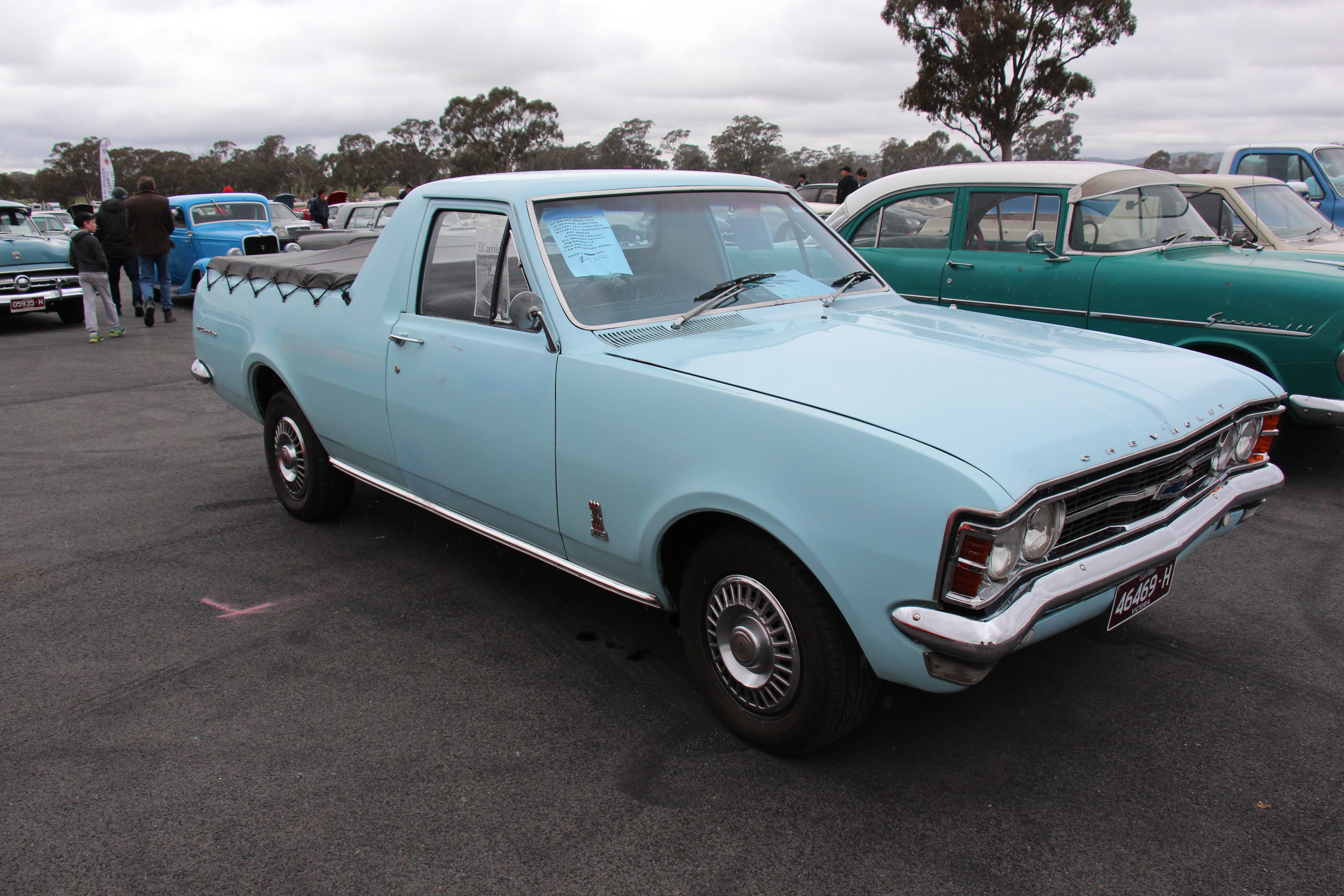
1970 Chevrolet El Camino (HT) utility (South Africa)

The HT utility was assembled in South Africa as the Chevrolet El Camino. The interior, front fascia, and badging were unique to South Africa and it received either a Chevrolet 250 cu in (4.1 L) six-cylinder engine or the V8. Less than 500 Holdens were exported in this way.
