= Holden HG =

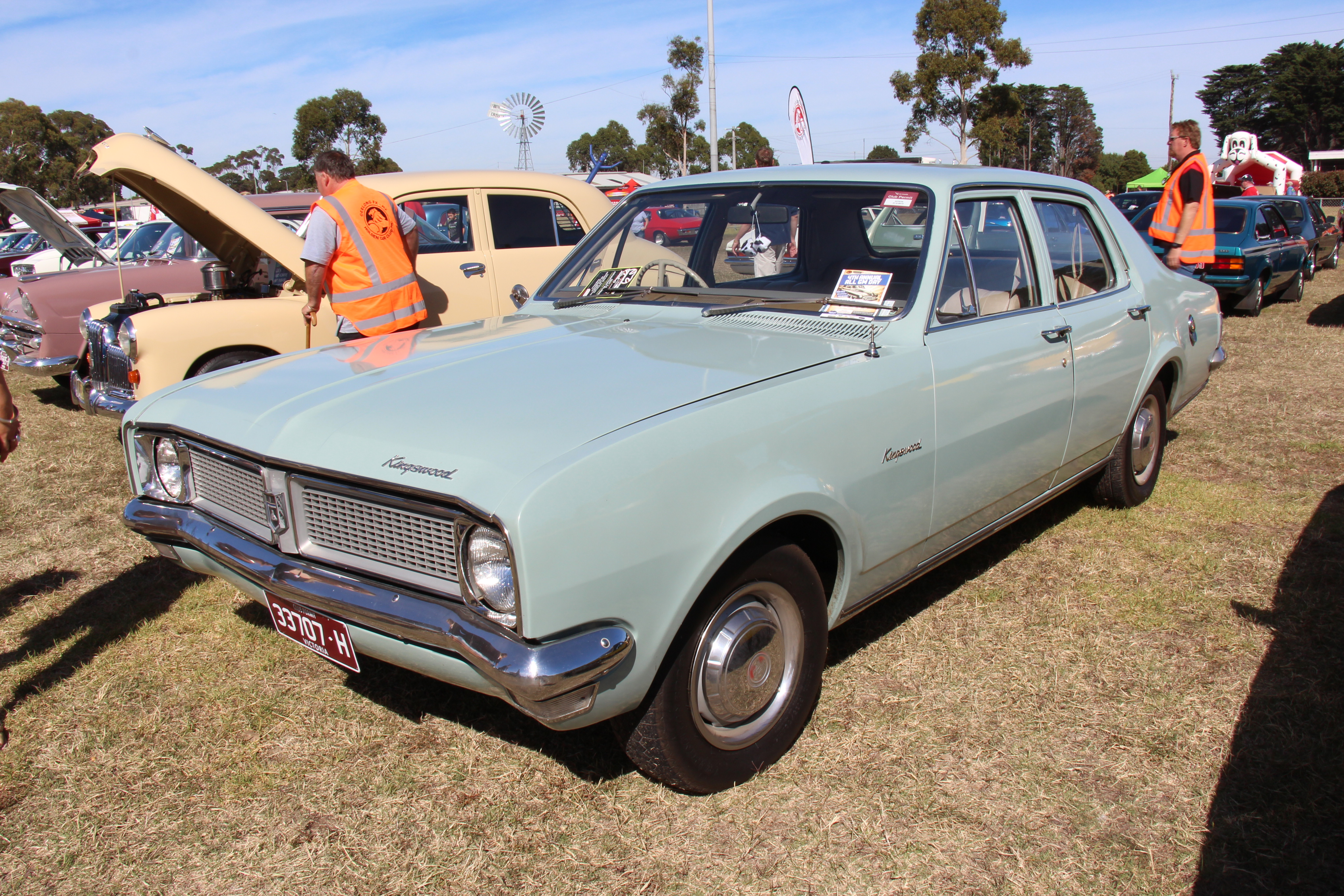
- Holden Kingswood Sedan

Overview
- Manufacturer: Holden (General Motors)
- Also called: Holden Belmont; Holden Kingswood; Holden Premier; Holden Brougham; Holden Monaro
- Production: July 1970 – July 1971
- Designer: Joe Schemansky

Body and chassis
- Class: Mid-size
- Body style: 4-door sedan 5-door station wagon 2-door coupé 2-door coupé utility 2-door panel van
- Layout: FR layout

Powertrain
- Engine: 3.2L 'Chevrolet 130' I6 (export only); 2.6L GMH '161' I6; 3.0L GMH '186' I6; 4.1L GMH '253' V8; 5.0L GMH '308' V8; 5.7L 'Chevrolet 350' V8
- Transmission: 3spd manual 4spd manual 2spd "Powerglide" automatic 3spd "Tri-Matic" automatic

Dimensions
- Wheelbase: 111.0 inches (2819 mm)
- Length: 184.8 inches (4694 mm) (sedans)
- Width: 71.8 inches (1824 mm) (Belmont)
- Height: 55.6 inches (1412 mm) (sedans)
- Kerb weight: 2814 lb (1276 kg) (Belmont)

Chronology
- Predecessor: Holden HT
- Successor: Holden HQ

The Holden HG is an automobile which was produced by Holden in Australia between 1970 and 1971. It was marketed under Belmont, Kingswood, Premier, Brougham and Monaro model names.

== Introduction ==
The Holden HG range was introduced on 26 July 1970, replacing the Holden HT series which had been in production since May 1969. Changes from the previous model included new grilles and body decorations as well as new safety features, colours and trim designs. All V8-engined models were now fitted with improved disc brakes and the suspension system of the Monaro GTS was modified for greater comfort.

== Model range ==
The mainstream HG series was offered in four-door sedan and five-door station wagon body styles in three trim levels.

- Belmont sedan
- Belmont station wagon
- Kingswood sedan
- Kingswood station wagon
- Premier sedan
- Premier station wagon

The Brougham, which used a body with an extended boot, was available in one model only.

- Brougham sedan

The Monaro was offered in three two-door coupe models

- Monaro coupe
- Monaro GTS coupe
- Monaro GTS 350 coupe

Commercial vehicle derivatives were available in two-door coupe utility and two-door panel van body styles.

- Belmont utility
- Belmont panel van
- Kingswood utility
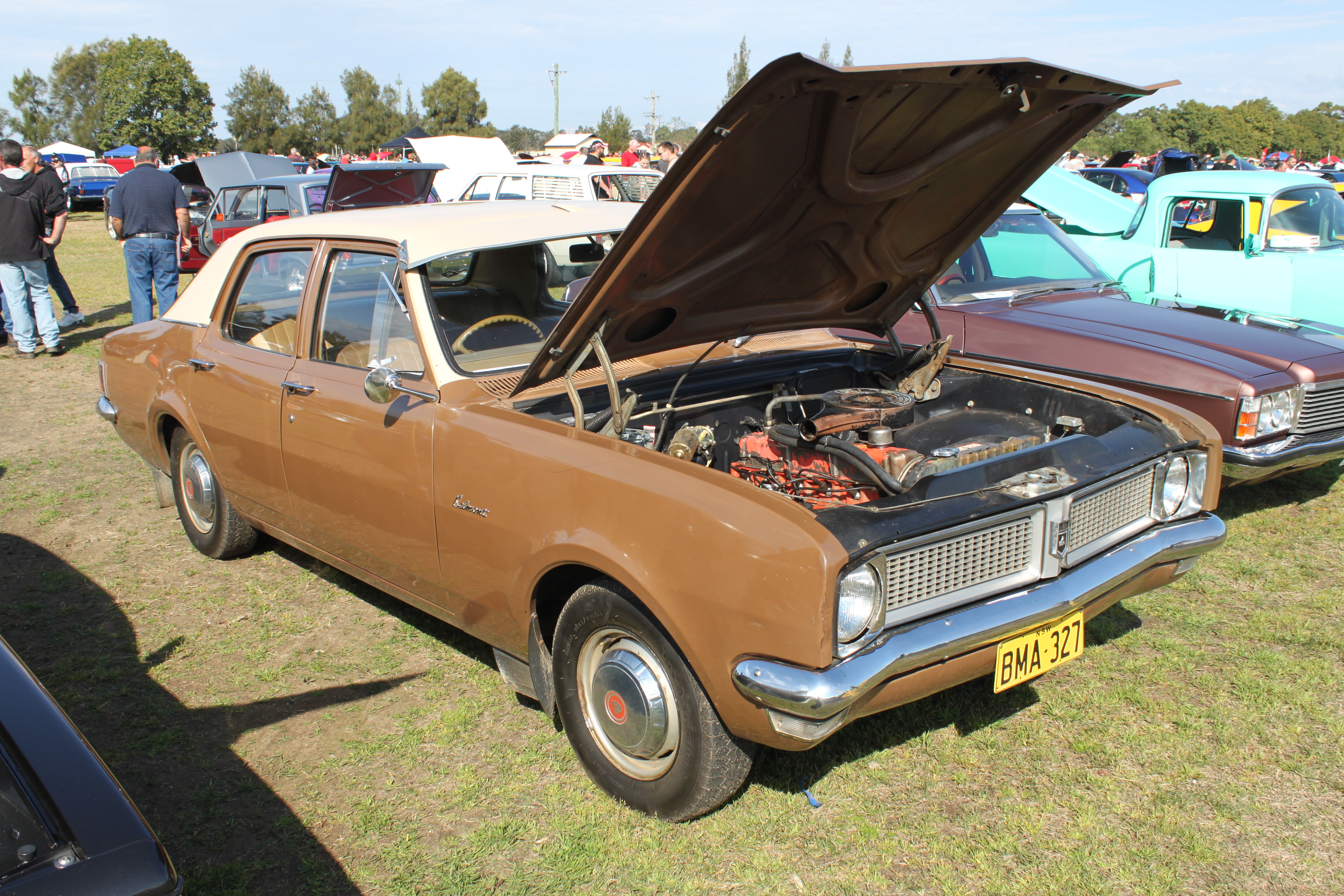
Holden Belmont sedan

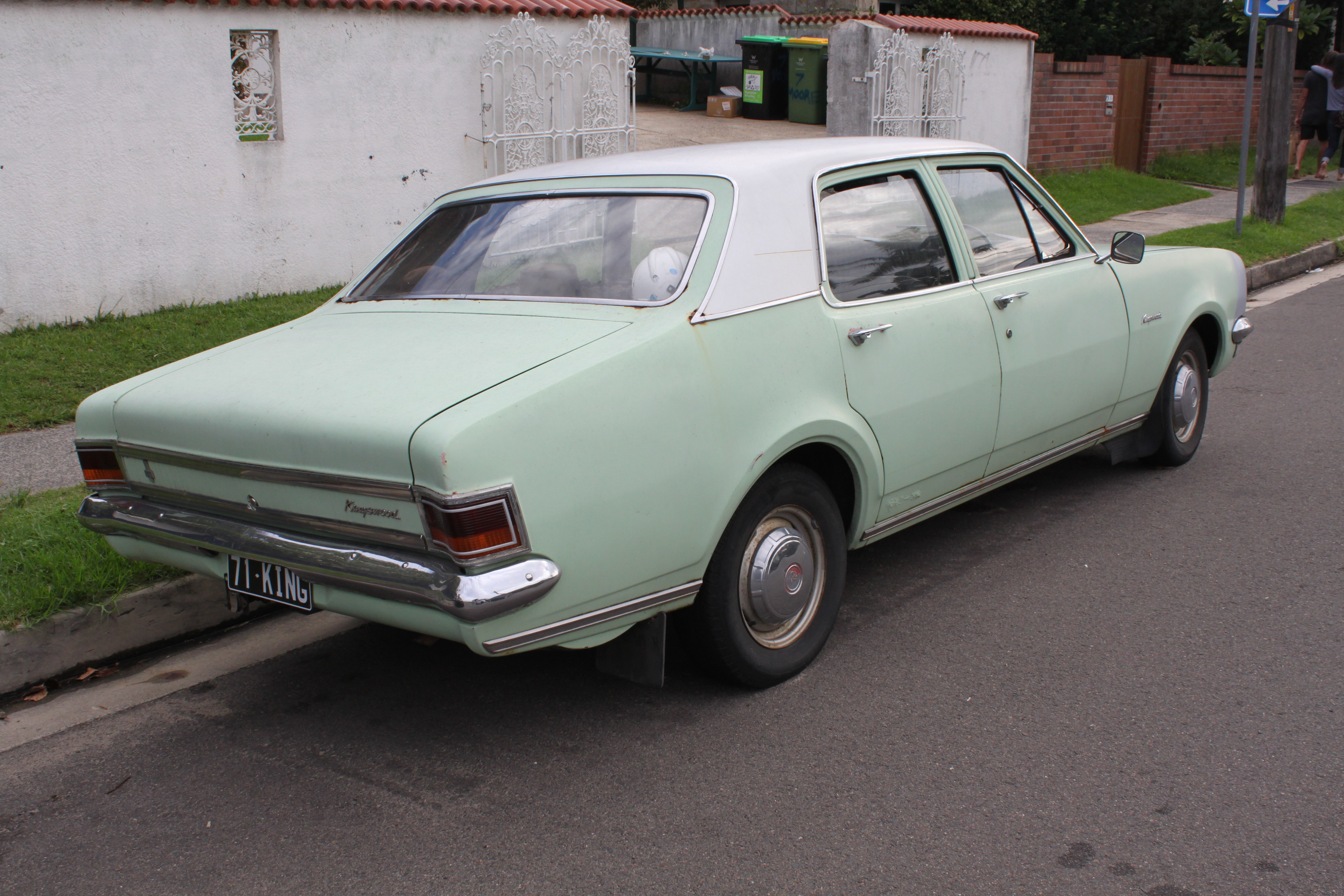
Holden Kingswood sedan

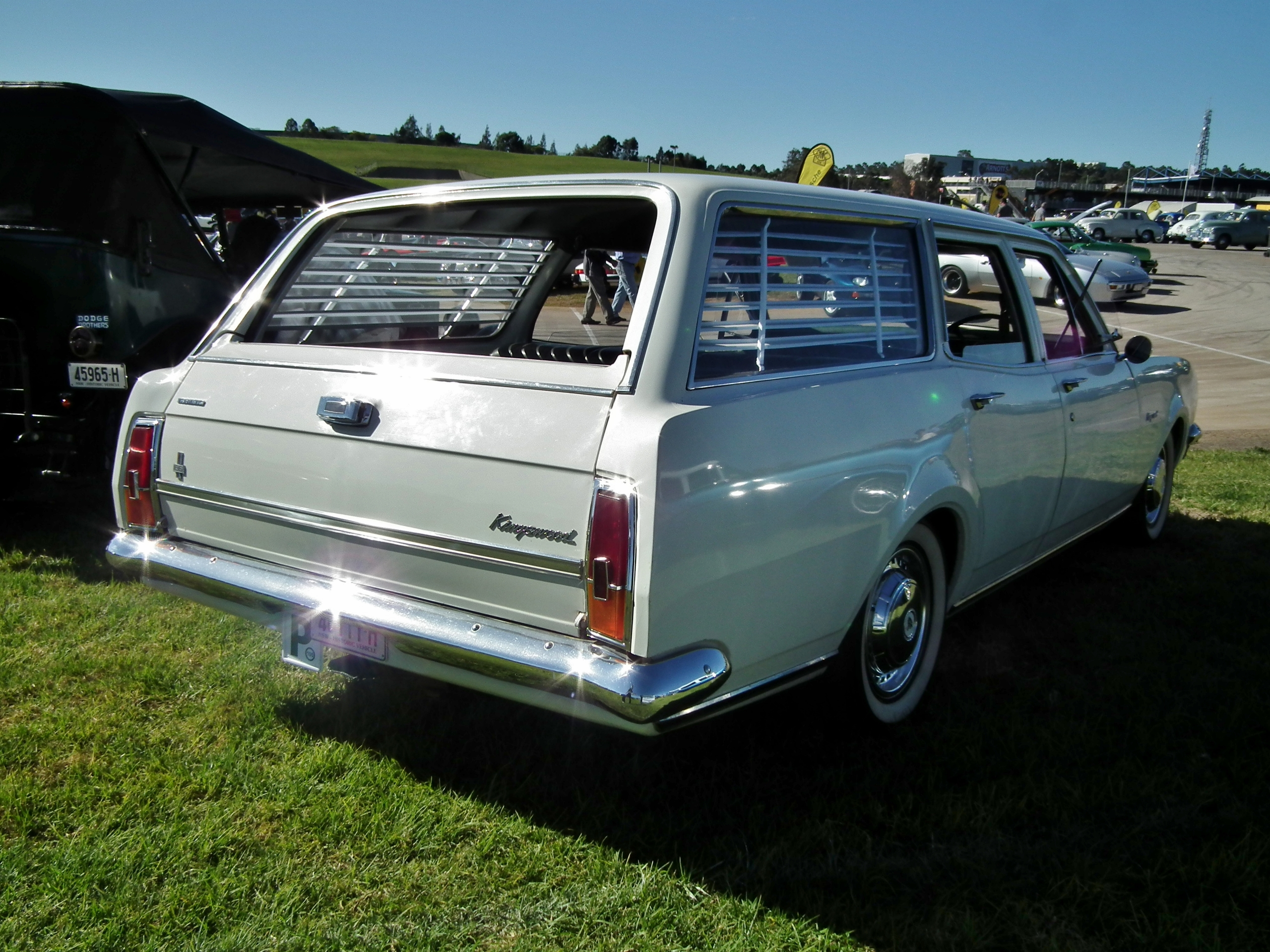
Holden Kingswood station wagon

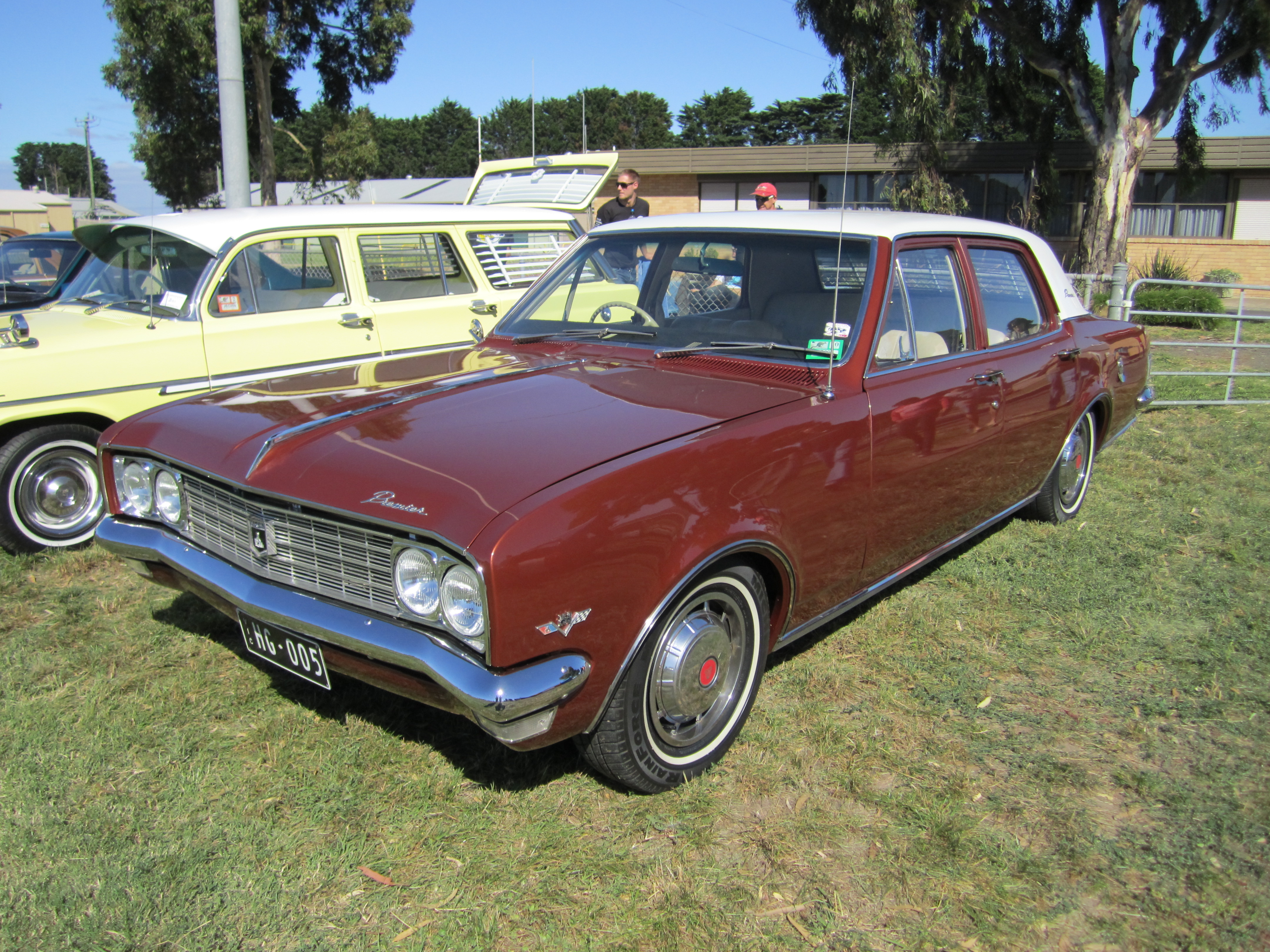
Holden Premier sedan

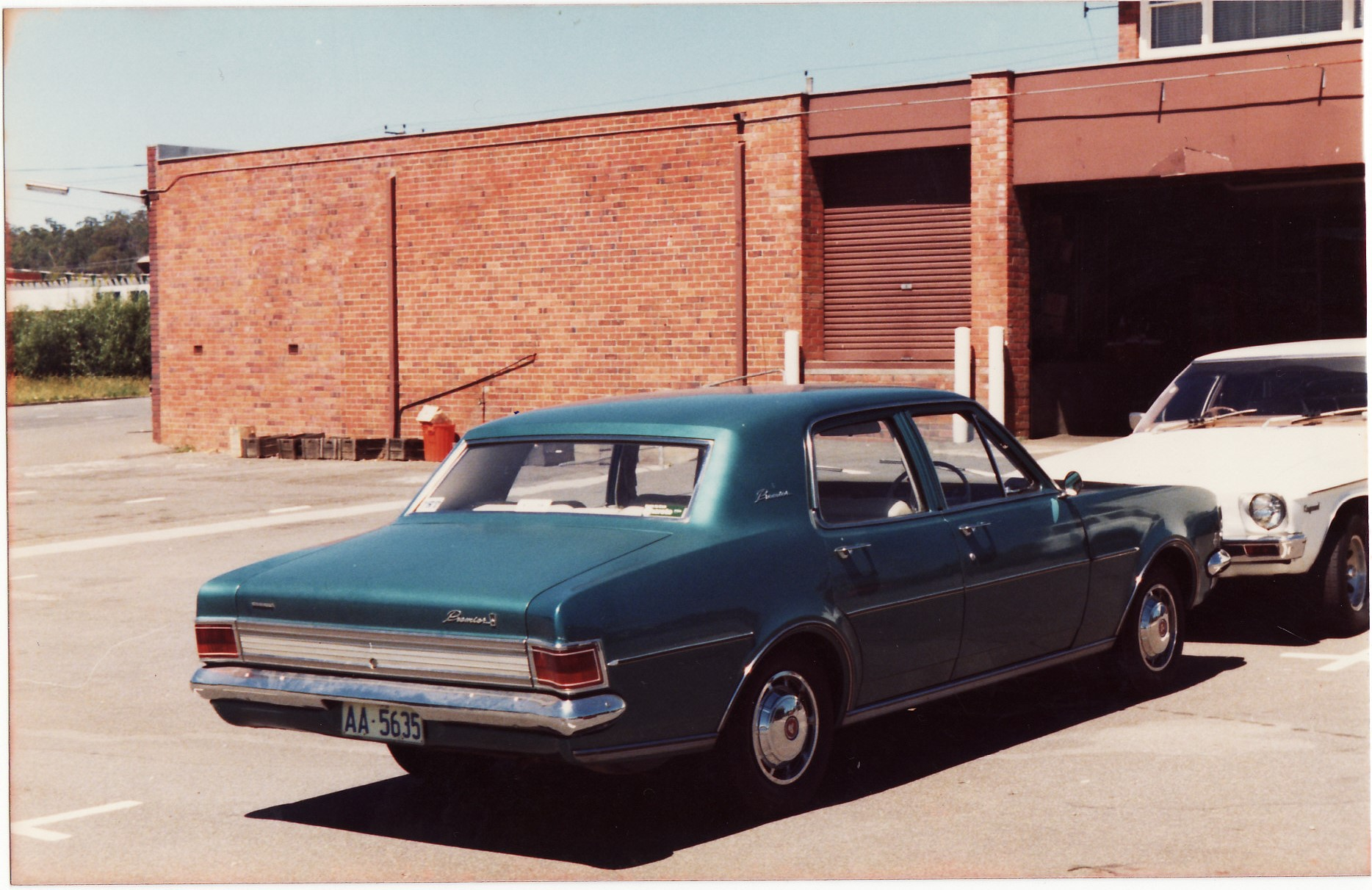
Holden Premier sedan

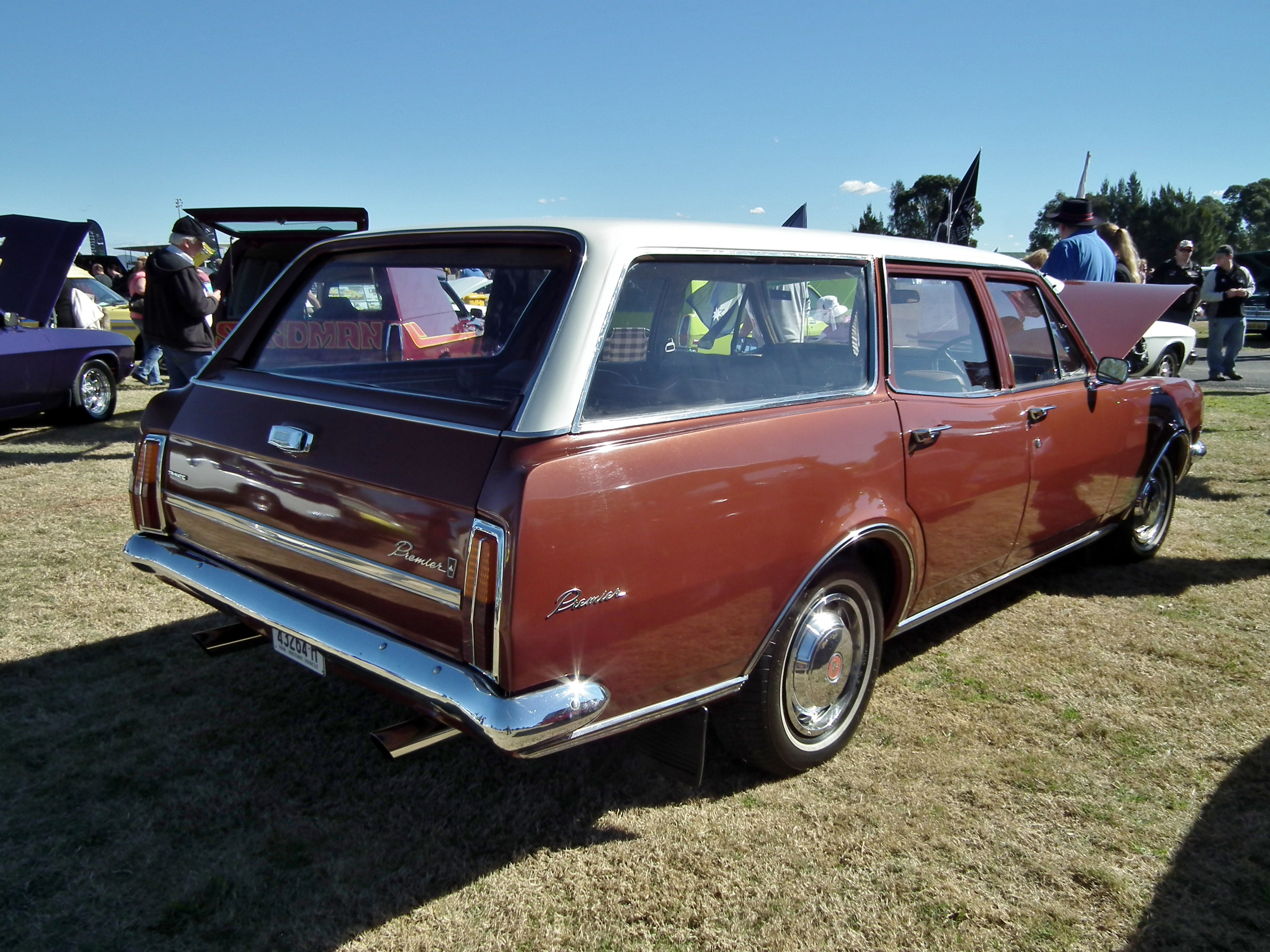
Holden Premier station wagon

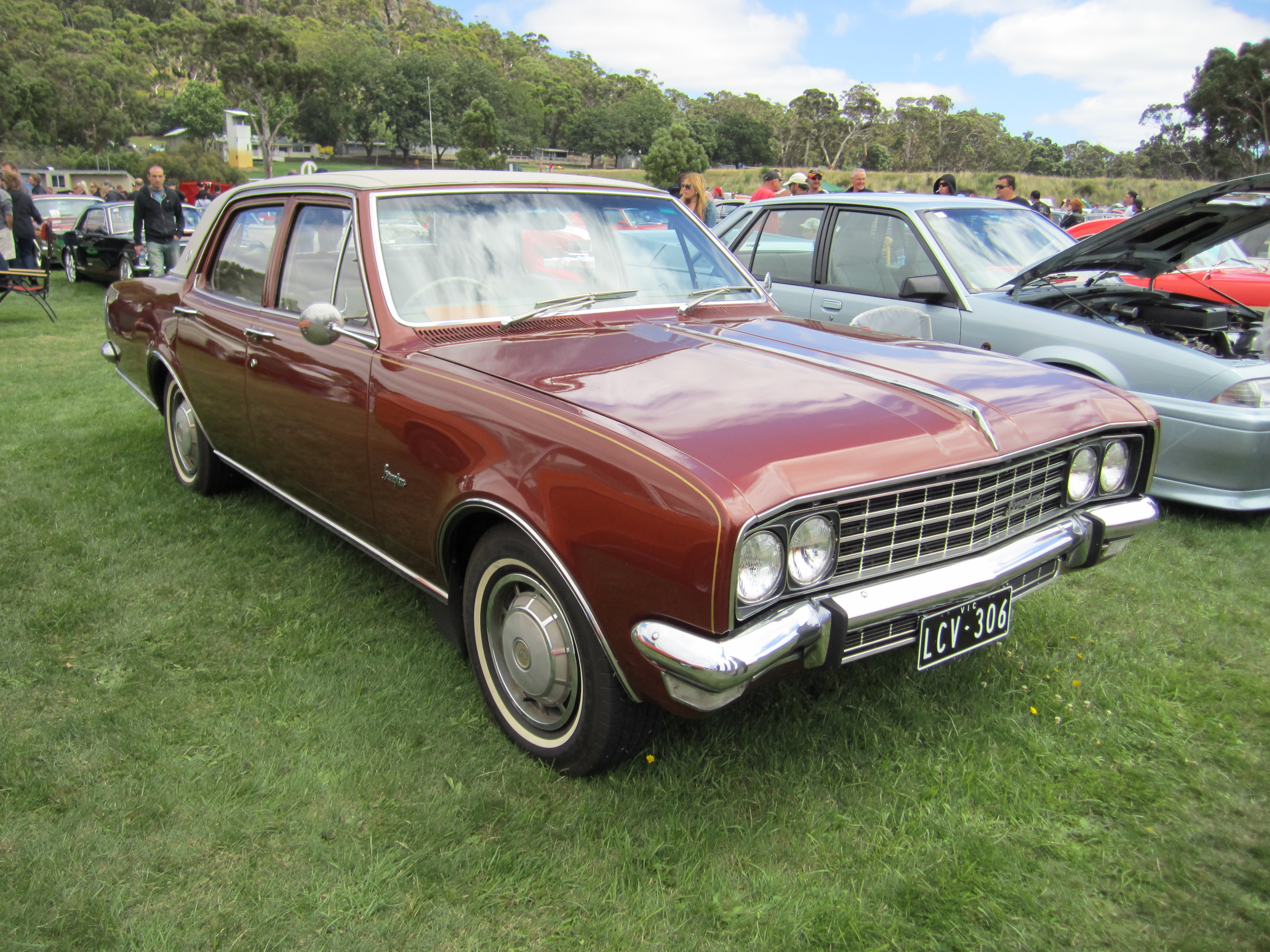
Holden Brougham

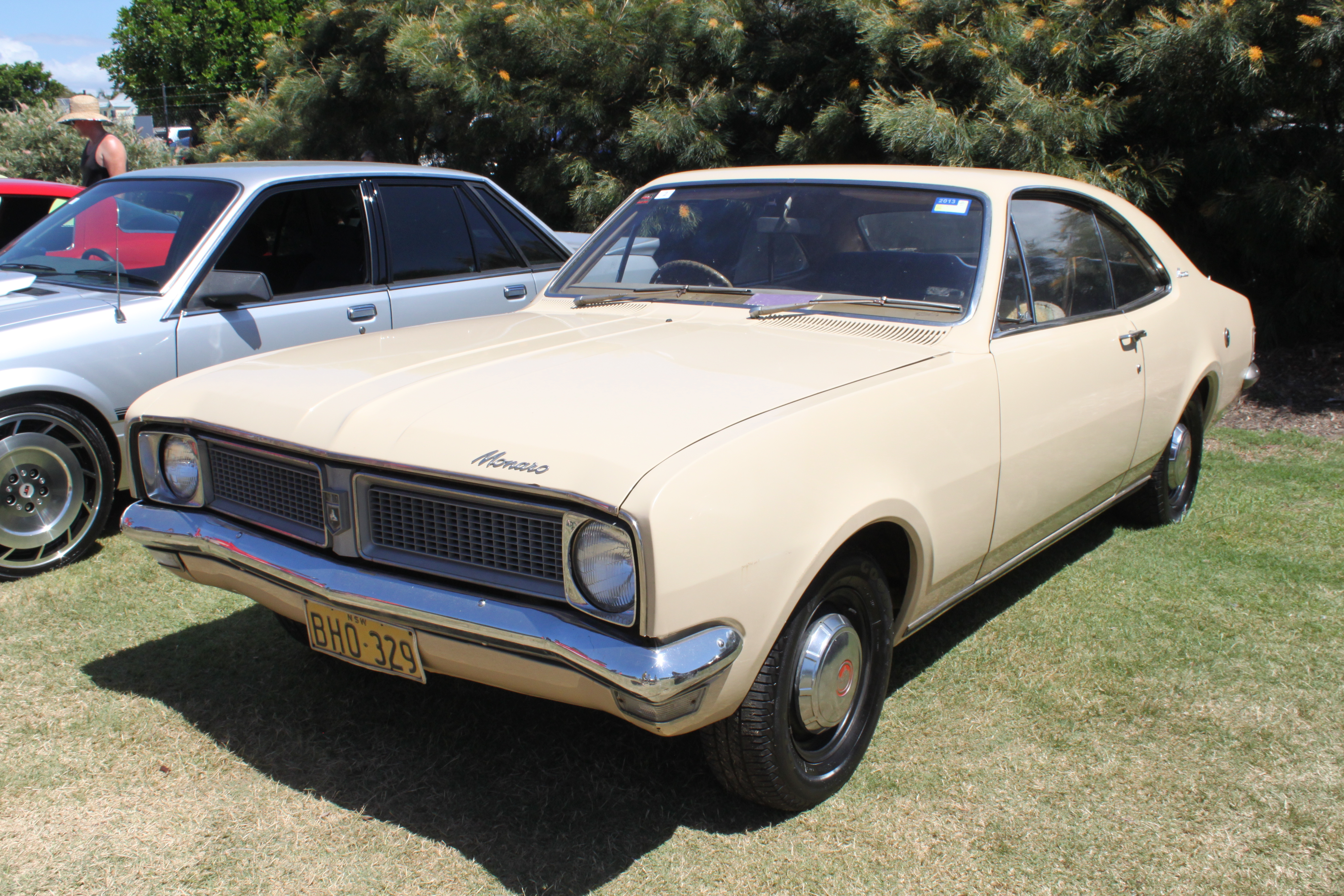
Holden Monaro

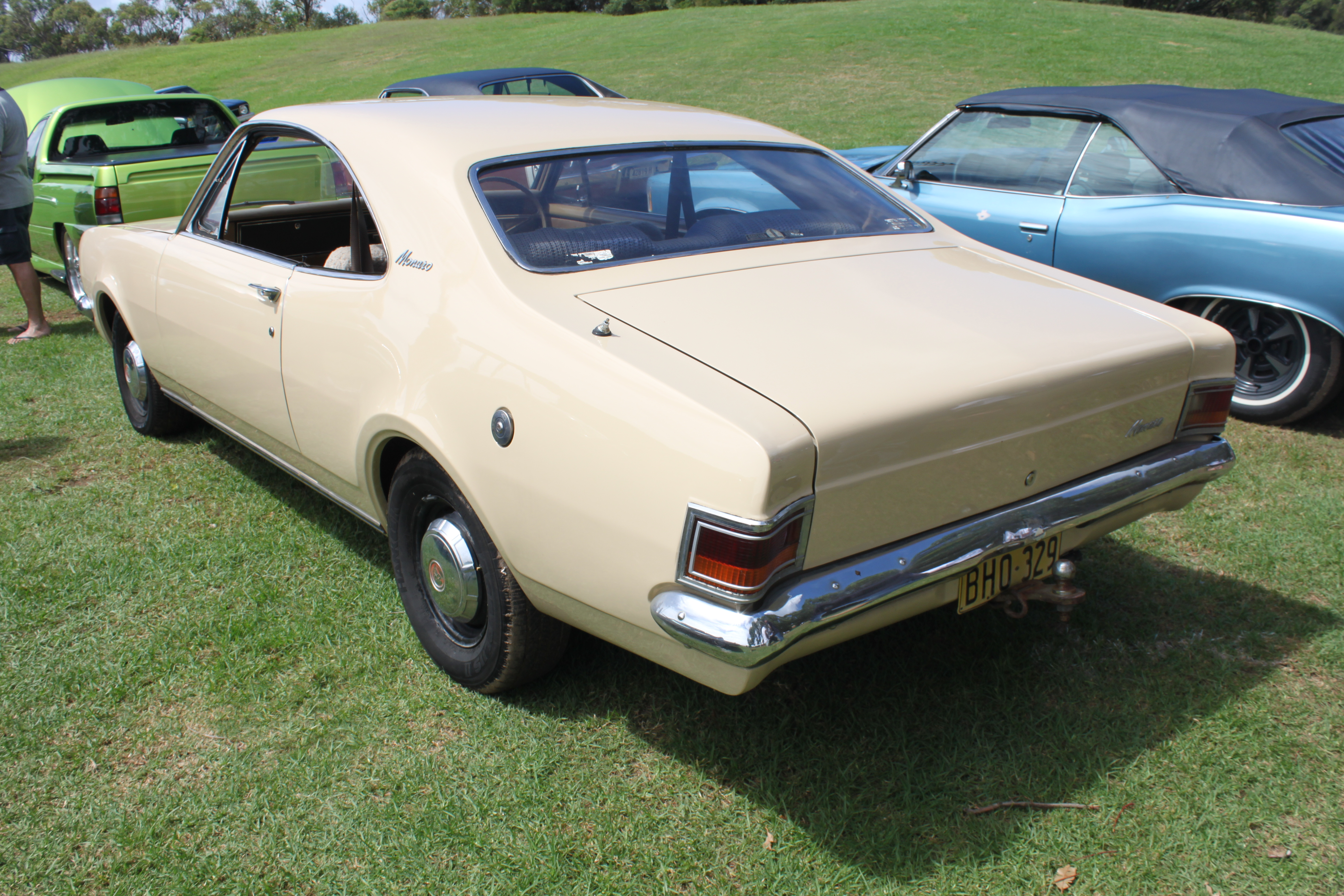
Holden Monaro

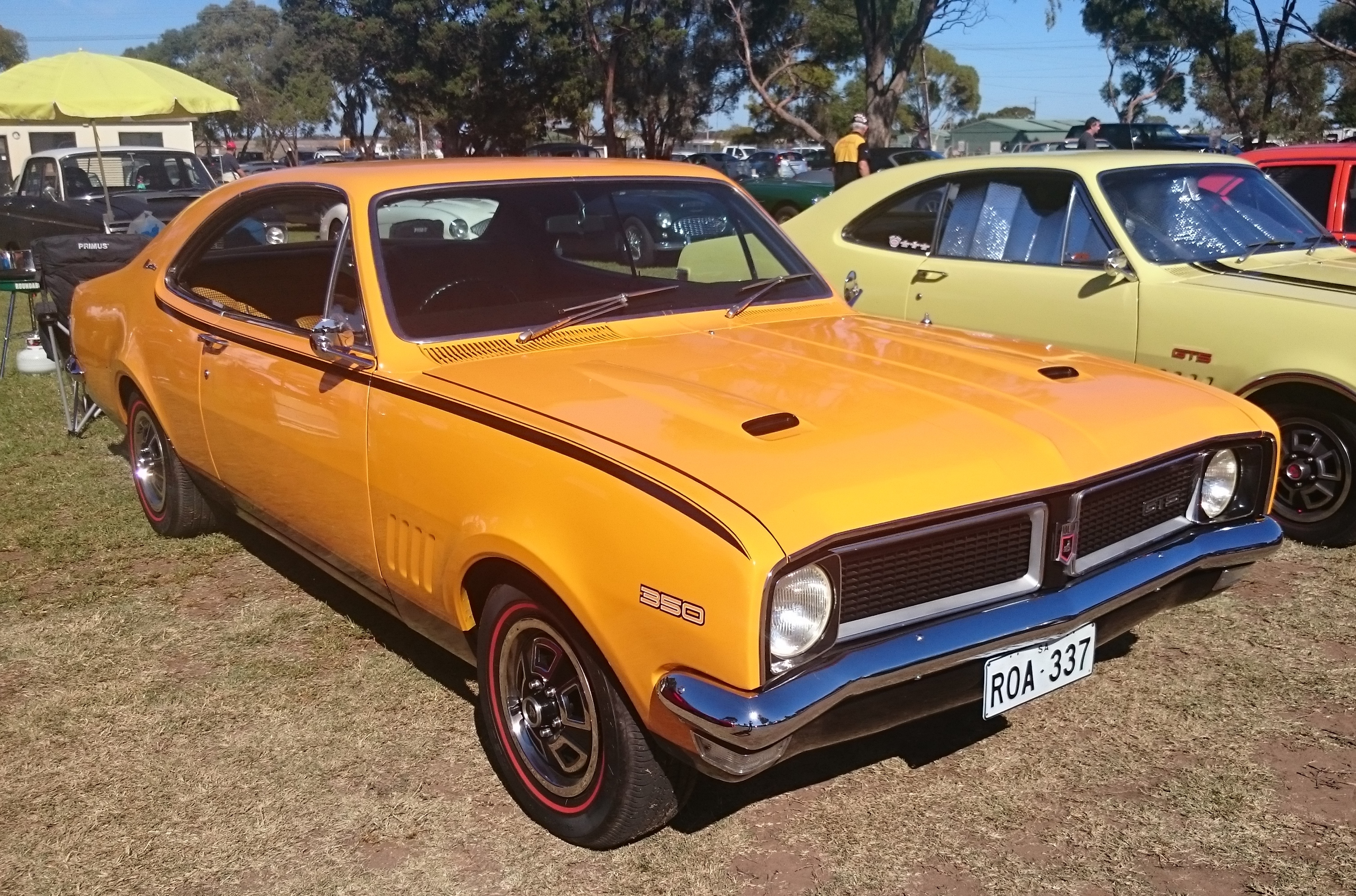
Holden Monaro GTS 350 (HG)

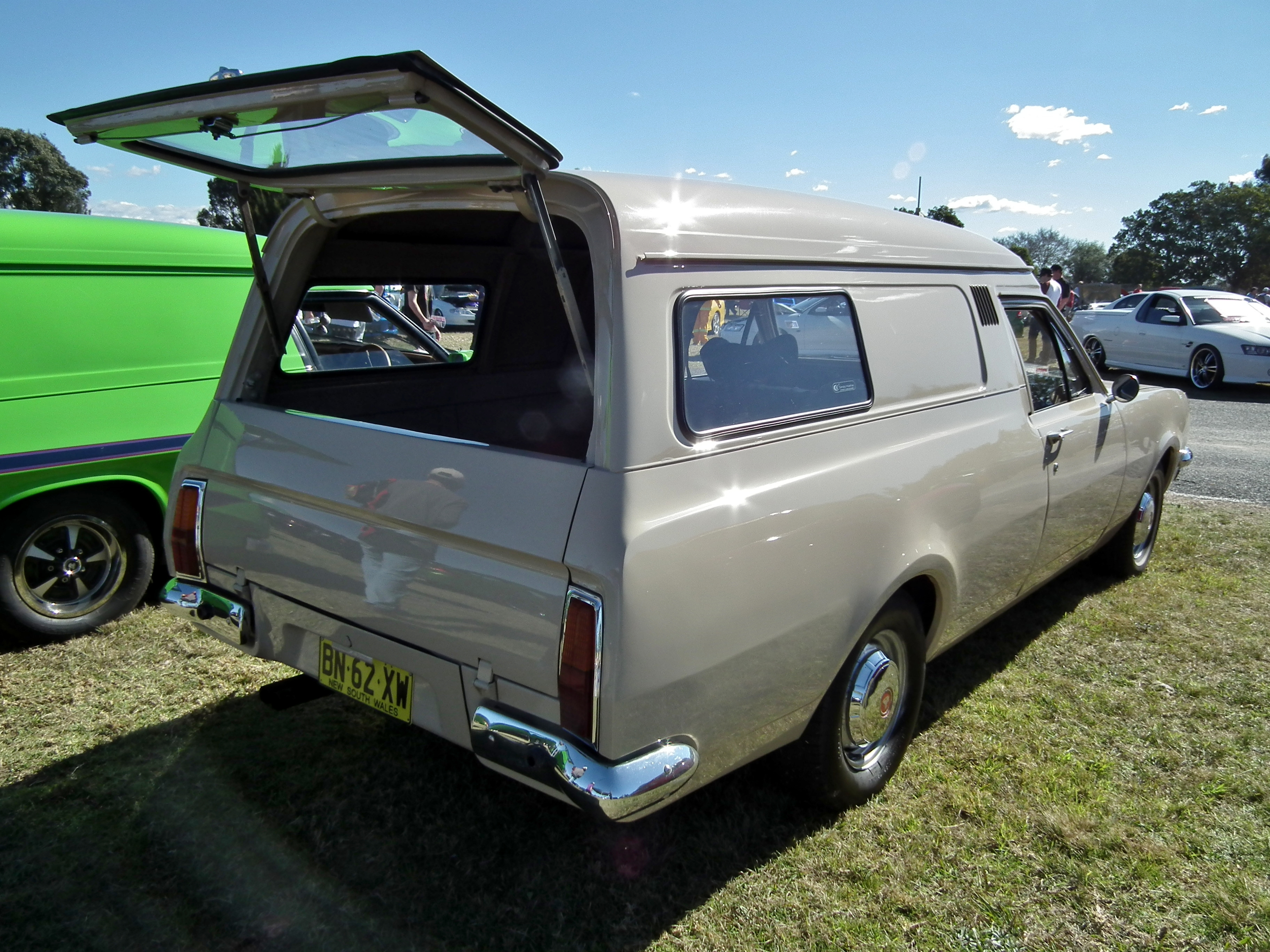
Holden Belmont panel van

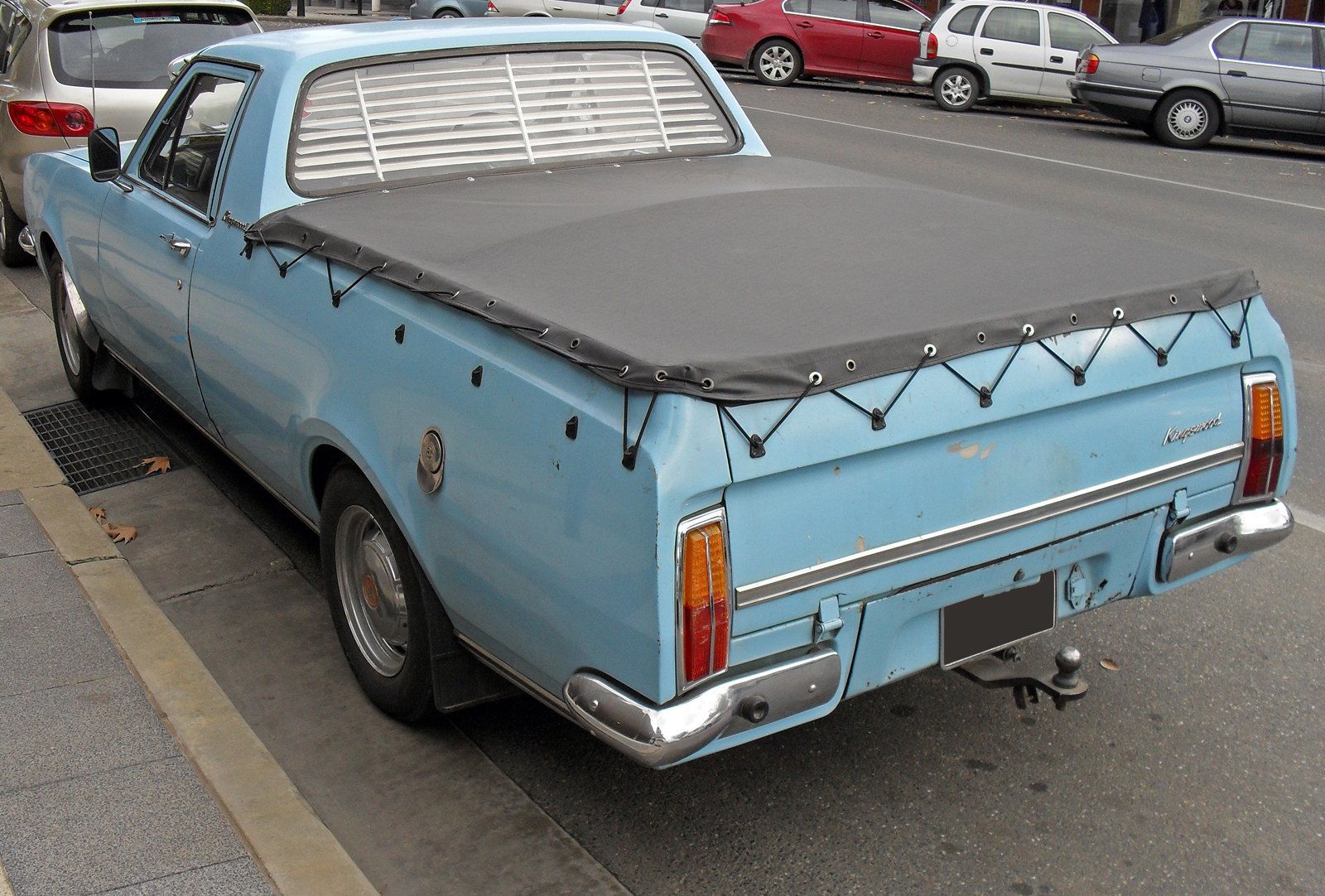
Holden Kingswood utility

== Engines and transmissions ==
The 161 cu in (2.6 L) and 186 cu in (3.0 L) inline six-cylinder engines were carried over from the HT range, as were the 253 cu in (4.1 L), 308 cu in (5.0 L) and 350 cu in (5.7 L) V8 engines. A new three-speed "Tri-Matic" automatic transmission was offered for the first time on the full-size Holden range. The "Tri-Matic" was standard on Premier and Brougham models, and offered as an option on all other models excepting the Monaro GTS 350.

== Production ==
The HG range was replaced by the Holden HQ series in July 1971, production having totaled 155,787 units. In total, 6,147 Monaros were produced.

== Export ==
The HG was also sold in South Africa, as the Chevrolet Kommando, Constantia, or El Camino bakkie (pickup). The El Camino sold very well, leaving GM South Africa with no more trucks but a surplus of passenger car parts in early 1972, when the succeeding HQ series was already on its way. The solution was to use up material for 3400 Constantias and Kommandos to build El Camino pickup trucks. These hybrids had considerably better equipment than the regular utility, and proved very popular with consumers, allowing GMSA to make a small profit on the entire deal.
