= Holden Brougham =

Luxury vehicle from Holden

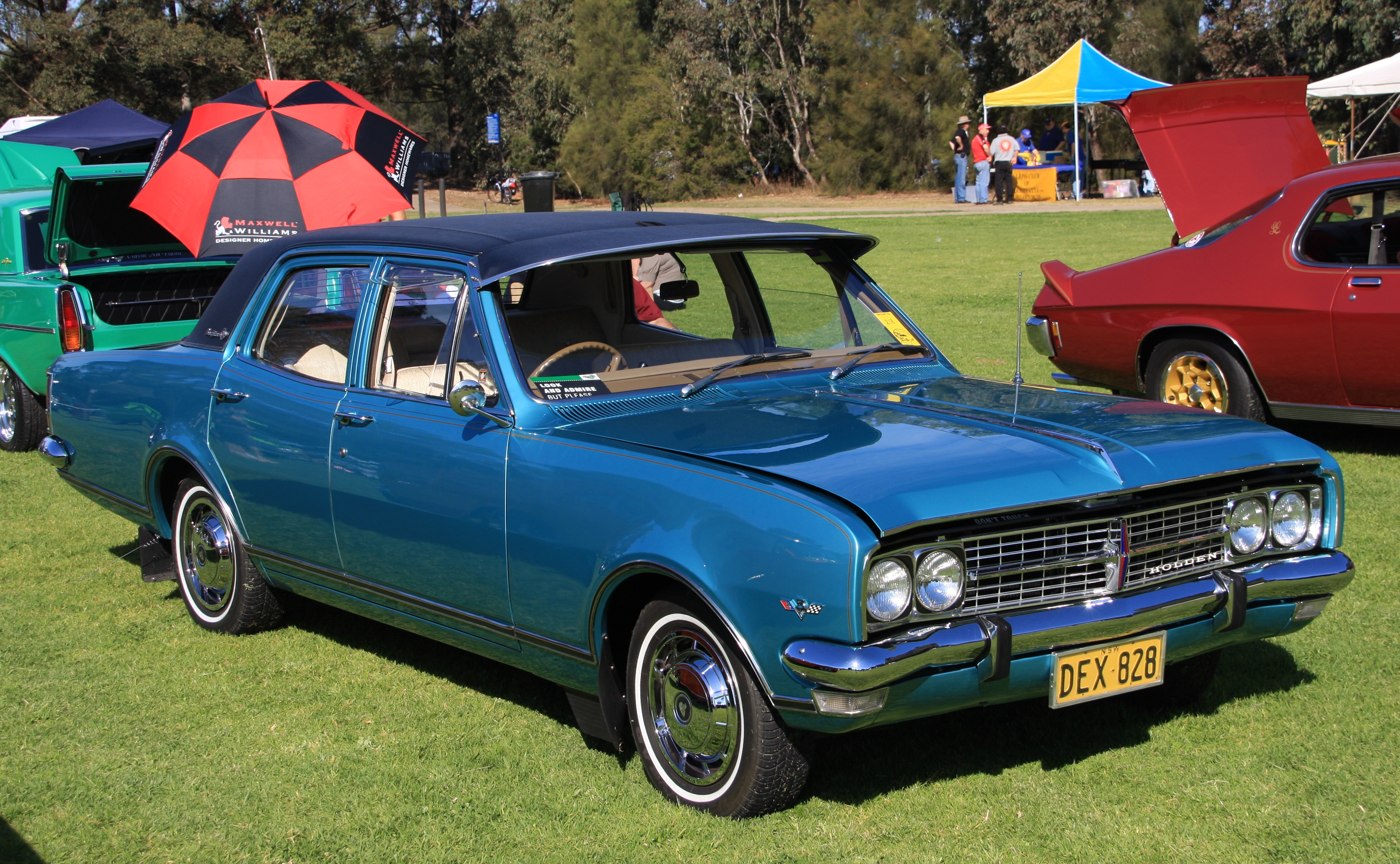

Overview
- Manufacturer: Holden
- Also called: Chevrolet Constantia (South Africa)
- Production: 1968–1971

Body and chassis
- Class: Full-size luxury car
- Body style: 4-door sedan
- Layout: Front-engine, rear-wheel-drive
- Related: Holden Premier

Powertrain
- Engine: 4,093 cc Chevrolet 250 I6 (ZA); 5,025 cc Chevrolet 307 V8; 5,042 cc GMH 308 V8
- Transmission: 2-speed Powerglide automatic (HK, HT); 3-speed Tri-Matic automatic (HT (May 1970 onwards), HG)

Dimensions
- Wheelbase: 111.5 in (2,832 mm)
- Length: 192 in (4,877 mm)
- Width: 71.4 in (1,814 mm)
- Height: 56 in (1,422 mm)
- Kerb weight: 3,097 lb (1,405 kg)

Chronology
- Predecessor: Pontiac Parisienne
- Successor: Statesman

The Holden Brougham is a full-size luxury car produced by Holden from 1968 to 1971. It was a hasty response to Ford Australia's successful Fairlane.

It was based on the Holden Premier, but with a lengthened rear body. The boot was extended by 8 in (200 mm), rather than increasing the 111 in (2,819 mm) wheelbase. It retained the Premier's four-headlight grille.

== History ==
The HK series Brougham was launched in July 1968, alongside the Holden Monaro coupé. The HT series was announced in 1969, and the HG series in 1970.

Because of its luxury positioning, the Brougham was only available with an automatic transmission, first a two-speed, then a three-speed after the HG series' launch.

The HK series Brougham was only available with a Chevrolet 307 V8 engine. The HT series was launched with the new Holden-designed and built 308 V8, and was the first Holden to be powered by the engine. For the rest of the HT range the 308 was made available in September 1969. The 308 was carried over to the HG Series Brougham.

Throughout its production life the Ford Fairlane outsold it by a large margin. The Brougham was replaced by the long-wheelbase Statesman models in 1971, on the redesigned HQ platform.

== South Africa ==
From 1969 to 1971 the Brougham was marketed in South Africa as the Chevrolet Constantia. In addition to the name change, the Constantia featured a unique grille and had trafficators on the leading edge of the front fenders. It utilised a Chevrolet 250 inline-six engine, with an optional Chevrolet 307 V8. Both engines came equipped with the two-speed Powerglide automatic transmission.

== Gallery ==
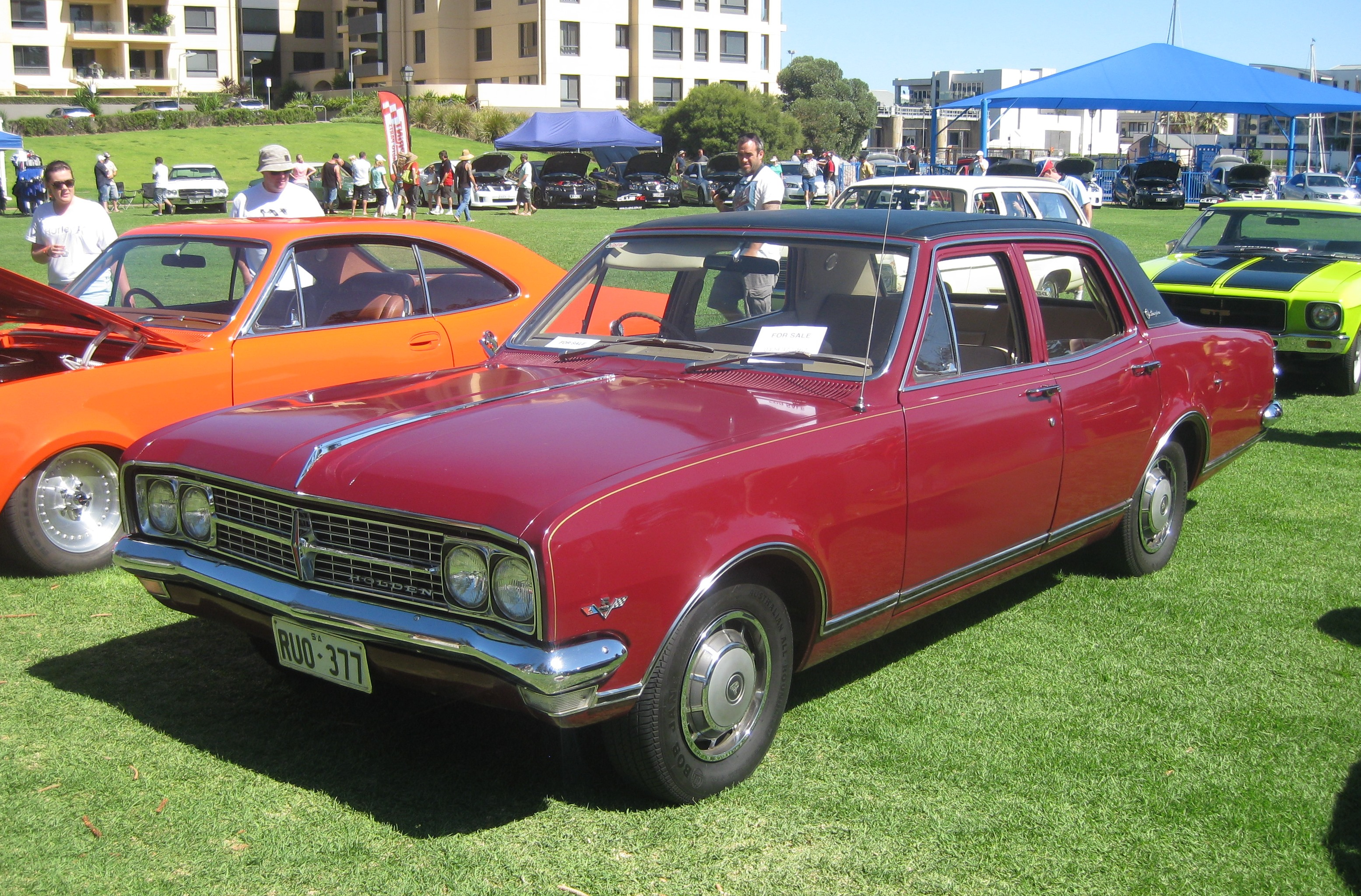
1968–1969 Holden HK Brougham

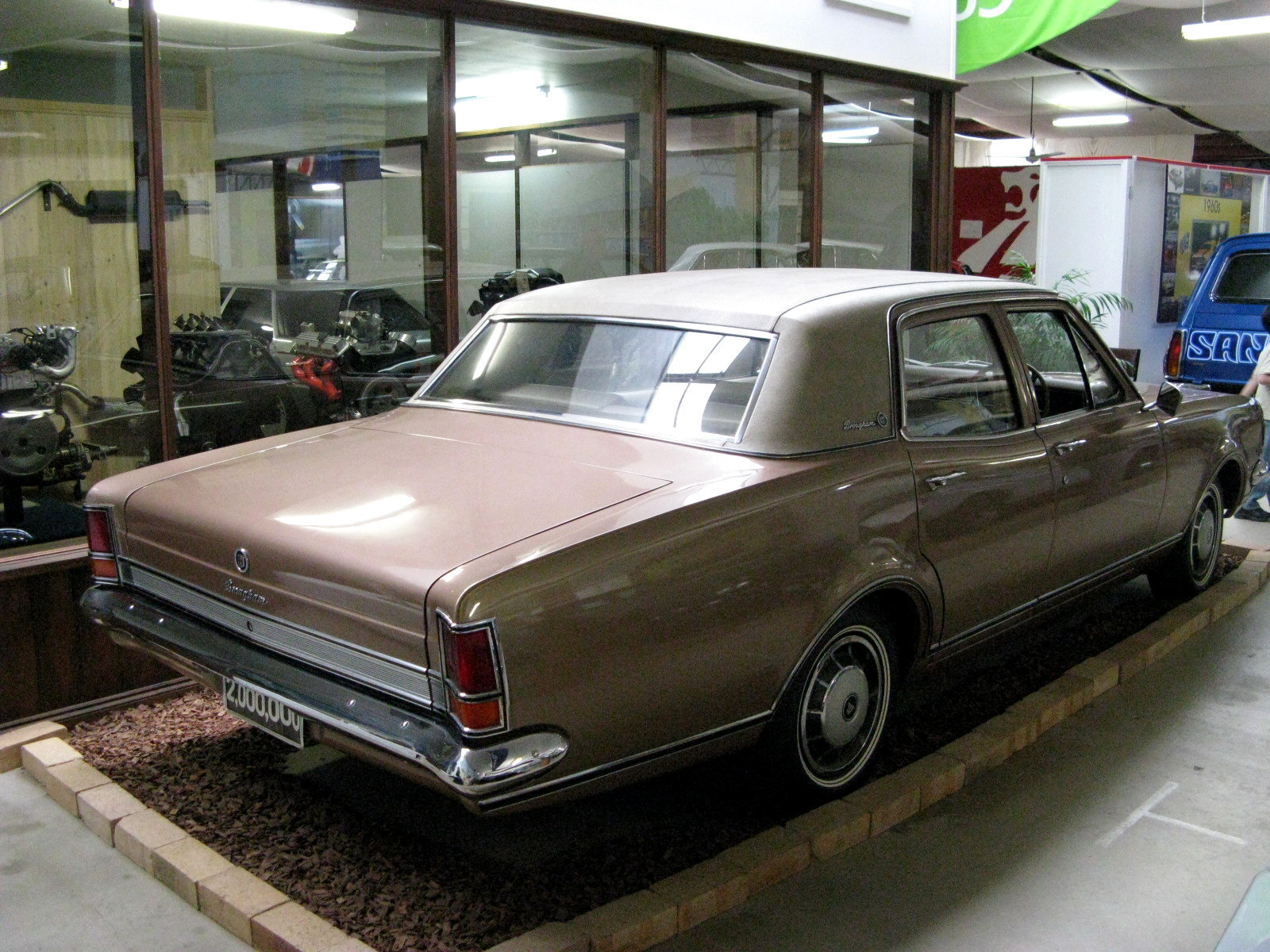
1968–1969 Holden HK Brougham

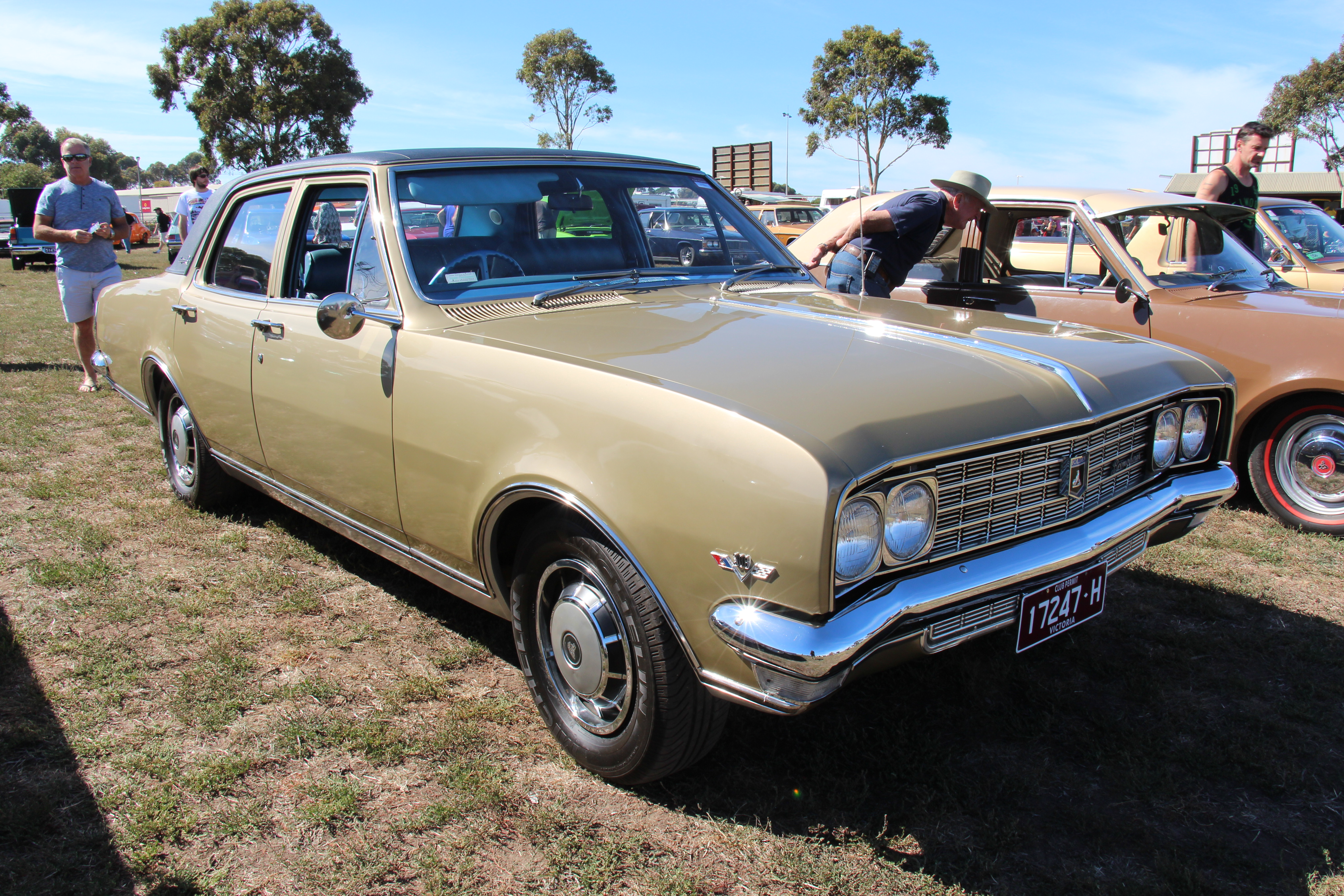
1969–1970 Holden HT Brougham

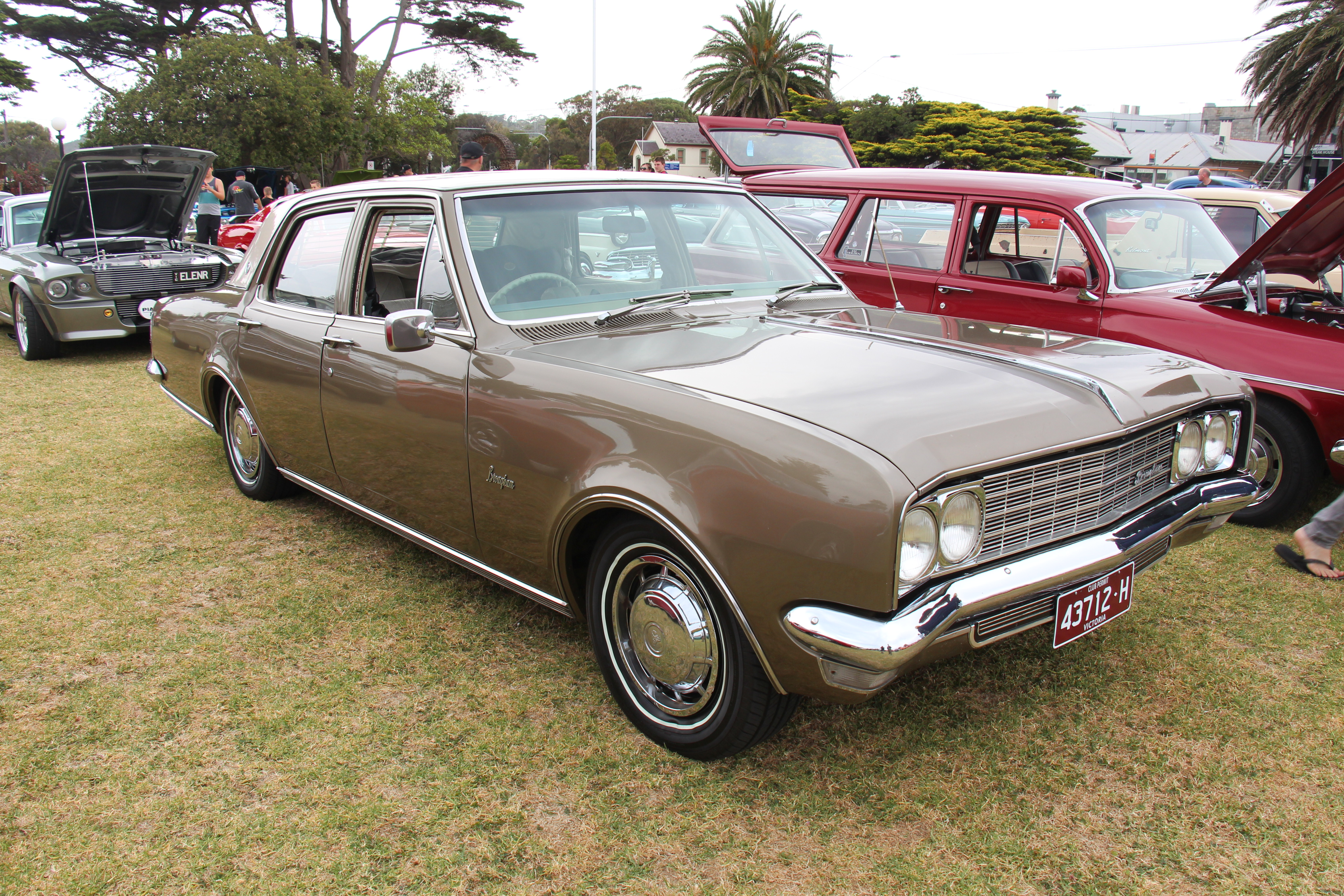
1970–1971 Holden HG Brougham
