= List of HSV vehicles =

This is a list of vehicles enhanced by Australian company Holden Special Vehicles, the performance vehicle partner of Holden. Marketed under the HSV brand name, unless otherwise indicated.

== Past models ==
=== Holden Special Vehicles ===
Exterior	Name	Year Introduced	Year Discontinued
	Astra Aero	1988	1989
	Astra SV1800	1988	1989
	Holden Commodore VL SS Group A SV (Note: Badged as a Holden)	1988	
	SV3800	1988	1990
	SV88	1988	
	SV F20	1988	
	LE	1989	1990
	SV89	1989	
	SV6	1989	1991
	SV5000	1989	1991
	SV LE	1989	1990
	Holden Commodore (VN) SS Group A SV (Note: Badged as a Holden)	1990	1991
	ClubSport	1990	2017
	8 Plus	1990	
	Challenger	1990	1991
	DMG90	1990	
	GTS V6	1990	1992
	Maloo	1990	2017
	Statesman	1990	1996
	SV T-30	1990	1991
	Plus 6	1991	
	LS	1991	
	LS utility	1991	1993
	Sport Wagon	1991	1993
	SV91	1991	1992
	+Six	1991	1993
	GTS	1992	2017
	Nitron	1992	
	Senator	1992	2017
	Jackaroo	1993	
	Caprice	1994	1996
	Manta	1995	1998
	Grange	1996	2016
	XU6	1998	2002
	XU8	1998	
	SV99	1999	2000
	Coupé	2001	2006
	SV300	2001	
	Avalanche	2003	2005
	Avalanche XUV	2004	2005
	SV6000	2005	
	VXR	2006	2009
	W427	2008	
	SportsCat	2018	2020

=== Exports ===
Exterior	Name	Year Introduced	Year Discontinued
Vauxhall
	VXR8	2007	2009
	VXR8 GTS	2010	2017
Chevrolet Special Vehicles
	CR8	2008	
