= HSV Senator =

Australian luxury performance car

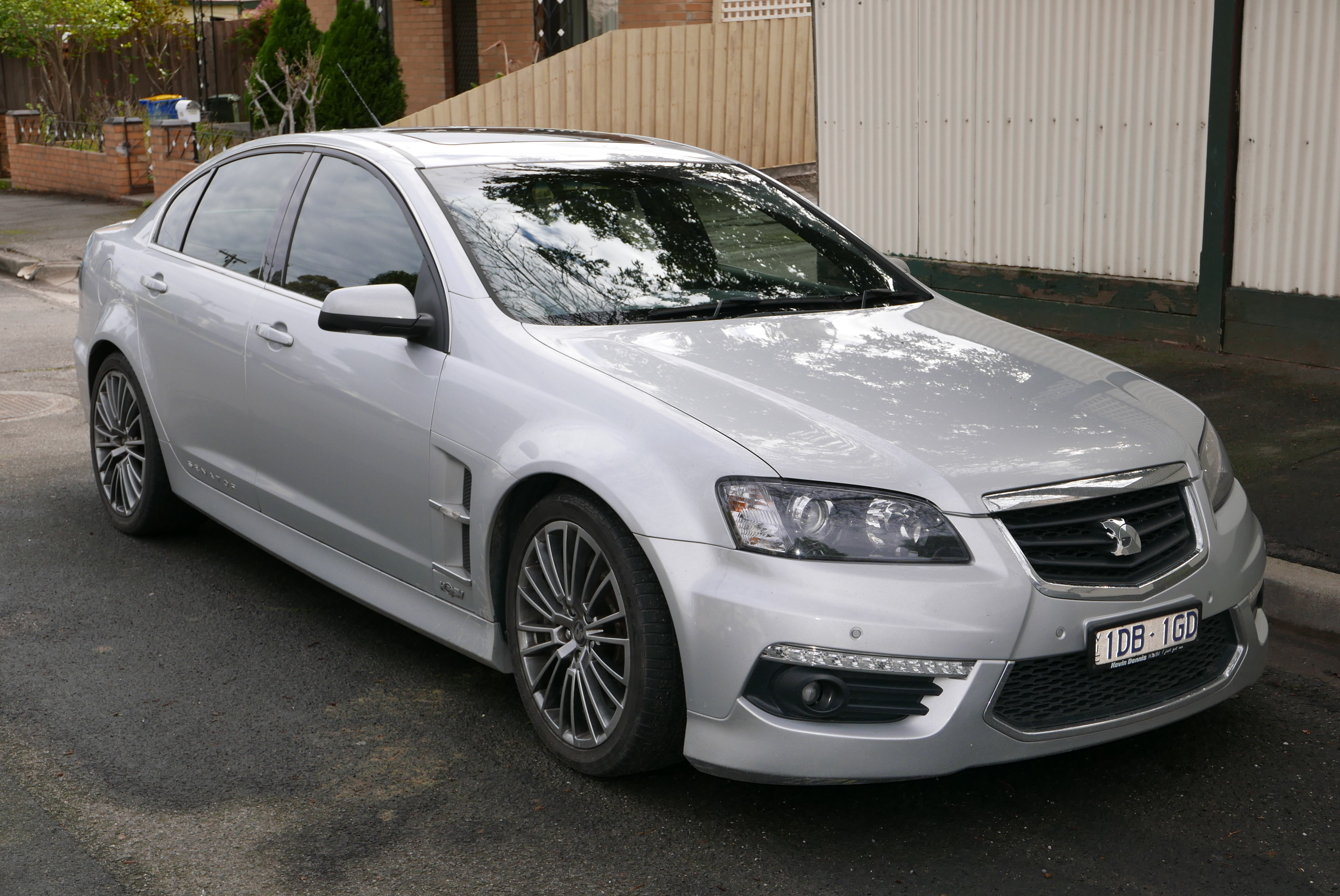
- 2010 HSV Senator Signature (VE II)

Overview
- Manufacturer: Holden Special Vehicles
- Production: 1992–2017
- Assembly: Australia: Notting Hill, Victoria; Clayton, Victoria

Body and chassis
- Class: Full-size car
- Body style: 4-door sedan; 5-door station wagon (1997)
- Platform: GM V platform (1992–2006); GM Zeta Platform (2006–2017)
- Related: Holden Calais; Holden Berlina

Powertrain
- Engine: 5.0L HEC 5000i V8; 5.7L HSV stroker V8; 5.7L 'LS1' V8; 6.0L 'LS2' V8; 6.2L 'LS3' V8; 6.2L 'LSA' supercharged V8

Chronology
- Predecessor: HSV SV91

The HSV Senator is a performance-luxury sedan produced by Holden Special Vehicles from 1992 to 2017. It was based on the Holden Berlina and Holden Calais.

== Background ==
When introduced in 1992 the Senator was the most luxurious model in the HSV range, replacing the HSV SV91. The fourth iteration of the 'SV' series of models which started in 1988. The first iteration of the series, the HSV SV88, was also the first vehicle to be badged under the Holden Special Vehicles marque. In 2008 a 20th anniversary model celebrating the SV88 was released, the Senator SV08.

== History ==
The VP Series Senator and Senator 500i were released in 1992, based on the Holden Berlina. It added independent rear suspension and an anti-lock braking system, new wheels, interior, and a body kit. In 1993, the VR Series Senator 185i and 215i were released. It added the option for a spoiler. In 1995, the VS Series Senator 185i and 215i were released. It came with 10-spoke wheels and two suspension options; Sport and Touring.

The VT Series Senator Signature was released in 1997, with the Senator 195i and Senator 220i. The VTII Series Senator was released in 1999, replacing the previous model's Holden V8 engines with the LS1 V8. A performance pack option added new suspension, brakes, seats, 18-inch alloy wheels from the WH Grange, optional satellite navigation, sunroof, and sound system. The Senator Signature wagon was released in 1997, selling 27 total units.

The VX Series Senator Signature 255i was released in 2000 with the Senator 300i releasing in 2001. The SV300 was released in 2001. The SV300 was only produced with the six-speed T-56 manual gearbox, 134 units were produced.. The Y Series Senator and Senator Signature were released in 2002. The Signature came with 19-inch wheels, the Premium Brake System, a calibrated suspension called 'Luxury 3', cross-drilled and ventilated brake discs, and four-piston calipers. The Z Series Senator was released in 2004.

The E Series Senator Signature was released in 2006. It included Magnetic Ride Control, with calibration was set to 'luxury' by default with a 'Performance' able to be enabled by a button, and 19-inch wheels. The E Series 2 was released in 2009 and added daytime running lights. The E Series 3 was released in 2010, adding a petrol/LPG bi-fuel option with liquid propane injection (LPI), a blind spot monitor, and optional bi-modal exhaust. Alongside other HSV models, the Senator began export to Singapore in 2010.

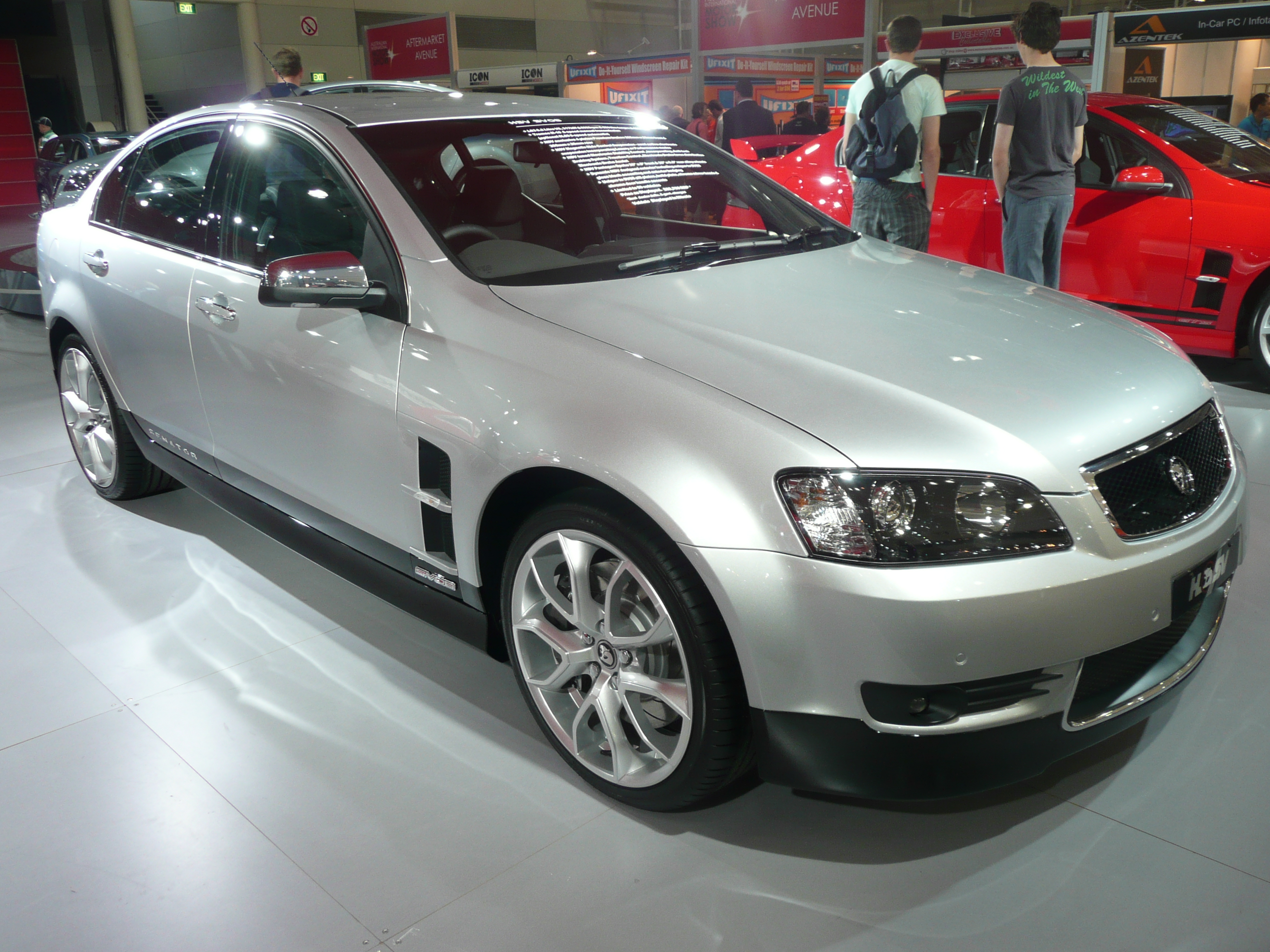
2008 HSV Senator Signature SV08

HSV unveiled the limited run Senator SV08 at the 2008 Australian International Motor Show for the 20th anniversary of the HSV SV88. It used six-speed Tremec TR-6060 for the manual transmission. It came standard with 20-inch 'Pentagon' wheels. 50 units were produced, 20 manual and 30 automatic.

The Gen-F Senator Signature was released in 2013. The Gen-F2 Senator Signature was released in 2016. The Senator was discontinued in 2017.

== Reception ==
The Senator competed with BMW 5 Series and other European luxury cars. It also competed against Ford Performance Vehicles' Force, and its replacement model the GT-E.

== Powertrain ==
Powertrains
Model	Engine	Power	Torque	Transmission
VP Senator (1992–1993)	5.0-litre Holden V8 engine	180 kW (241 hp)	400 N⋅m (295 lb⋅ft)	four-speed automatic six-speed manual
VP Senator 5000i (1992–1993)	5.0-litre HEC 5000i V8 engine	200 kW (268 hp)	411 N⋅m (303 lb⋅ft)	four-speed automatic
VR Senator 185i (1993–1995)	5.0-litre Holden V8 engine	185 kW (248 hp)	400 N⋅m (295 lb⋅ft)	four-speed automatic six-speed manual
VR Senator 215i (1993–1995)	5.0-litre Holden V8 engine	215 kW (288 hp)	475 N⋅m (350 lb⋅ft)	four-speed automatic six-speed manual
VS Senator 185i (1995–1997)	5.0-litre Holden V8 engine	185 kW (248 hp)	400 N⋅m (295 lb⋅ft)	automatic five-speed manual
VS Senator 185i (1995–1997)	5.0-litre Holden V8 engine	215 kW (288 hp)	475 N⋅m (350 lb⋅ft)	six-speed manual
VT Senator 195i (1997–1999)	5.0-litre Holden V8 engine	195 kW (261 hp)	430 N⋅m (317 lb⋅ft)	four-speed automatic six-speed manual
VT Senator 220i (1997–1999)	5.7-litre HSV Stroker V8	220 kW (295 hp)	475 N⋅m (350 lb⋅ft)	four-speed automatic six-speed manual
VTII Senator and Senator Signature (1999–2000)	5.7-litre LS1 V8	250 kW (335 hp)	473 N⋅m (349 lb⋅ft)	automatic six-speed manual
VX Senator 255i (2000–2002)	5.7-litre LS1 V8	255 kW (342 hp)	475 N⋅m (350 lb⋅ft)	automatic
VX Senator 300i and SV300 (2000–2002)	5.7-litre LS1 V8	300 kW (402 hp)	510 N⋅m (376 lb⋅ft)	six-speed manual
VY Senator (2002–2003)	5.7-litre LS1 V8	260 kW (349 hp)	475 N⋅m (350 lb⋅ft)	
VYII Senator (2003–2005)	5.7-litre LS1 V8	285 kW (382 hp)	510 N⋅m (376 lb⋅ft)	
VZ Senator (2005–2007)	6.0-litre LS2 V8	297 kW (398 hp)	530 N⋅m (391 lb⋅ft)	
VE Senator (2007–2008)	6.0-litre LS2 V8	307 kW (412 hp)	550 N⋅m (406 lb⋅ft)	six-speed automatic six-speed manual
VE Senator (2008–2010)	6.2-litre LS3 V8	317 kW (425 hp)	550 N⋅m (406 lb⋅ft)	
VE Senator (2010–2013)	6.2-litre LS3 V8	325 kW (436 hp)	550 N⋅m (406 lb⋅ft)	six-speed automatic six-speed manual
VF Senator (2013–2016)	6.2-litre LS3 V8	400 kW (536 hp)	570 N⋅m (420 lb⋅ft)	six-speed automatic manual
VFII Senator (2016–2017)	6.2-litre LS3 V8	400 kW (536 hp)	671 N⋅m (495 lb⋅ft)	six-speed automatic six-speed manual
VFII Senator '30 years' (2017)	6.2-litre LS3 V8	410 kW (550 hp)	691 N⋅m (510 lb⋅ft)	six-speed automatic
