= Walkinshaw Automotive Group =

Australian automotive company

Walkinshaw Group
- Company type: Private
- Industry: Automotive
- Founded: 1987
- Founder: Tom Walkinshaw
- Headquarters: Melbourne, Australia
- Area served: Australia
- Key people: Ryan Walkinshaw (CEO)
- Products: Performance vehicles, automotive engineering, caravans, sports goods
- Services: Design, engineering, manufacturing, marketing
- Number of employees: Over 1200

Walkinshaw Group is an Australian company involved in the design, engineering, development, and marketing of performance vehicles, based in Melbourne, Australia.

Walkinshaw Group was established in 1987 in Clayton, Victoria. It was born from Tom Walkinshaw Racing, owned and operated by Scottish racing driver and entrepreneur Tom Walkinshaw, opening operations in Australia. In 1987 Holden entered a joint-venture with Walkinshaw Group and created Holden Special Vehicles (HSV).

The first car developed by HSV was the Holden VL Commodore SS Group A SV in 1988 – which went on to win the 1990 Bathurst 1000, and is responsible for some of the most well-renowned performance vehicles in Australian motoring history.

After Tom Walkinshaw died in 2010, his eldest son Ryan Walkinshaw took over as the Walkinshaw Group CEO and owner, with Tom's wife Martine Walkinshaw, and youngest son Sean Walkinshaw also involved in the operations today.

In 2021, with General Motors discontinuing Holden, which subsequently meant the end of new Holden Special Vehicles available to the market, the Walkinshaw Group transformed their operations to encompass five key areas, Walkinshaw Automotive Group, its automotive manufacturing arm, which also offers manufacturing and engineering options outside of the automotive industry, Walkinshaw Performance, its high-performance department, Walkinshaw Sports, a key golf and sporting goods distribution company that works with some of the biggest brands in the industry, along with the racing team, Walkinshaw Andretti United who compete in the Supercars Championship.

Walkinshaw Andretti United is a partnership between Walkinshaw Racing, Andretti Autosport, and United Autosports, owned by Zak Brown.

The company now works directly with a number of OEM's such as General Motors, Toyota, RAM, and Volkswagen Australia.

It employs over 1200 people across the business.
