= Vauxhall VXR8 =

British performance car

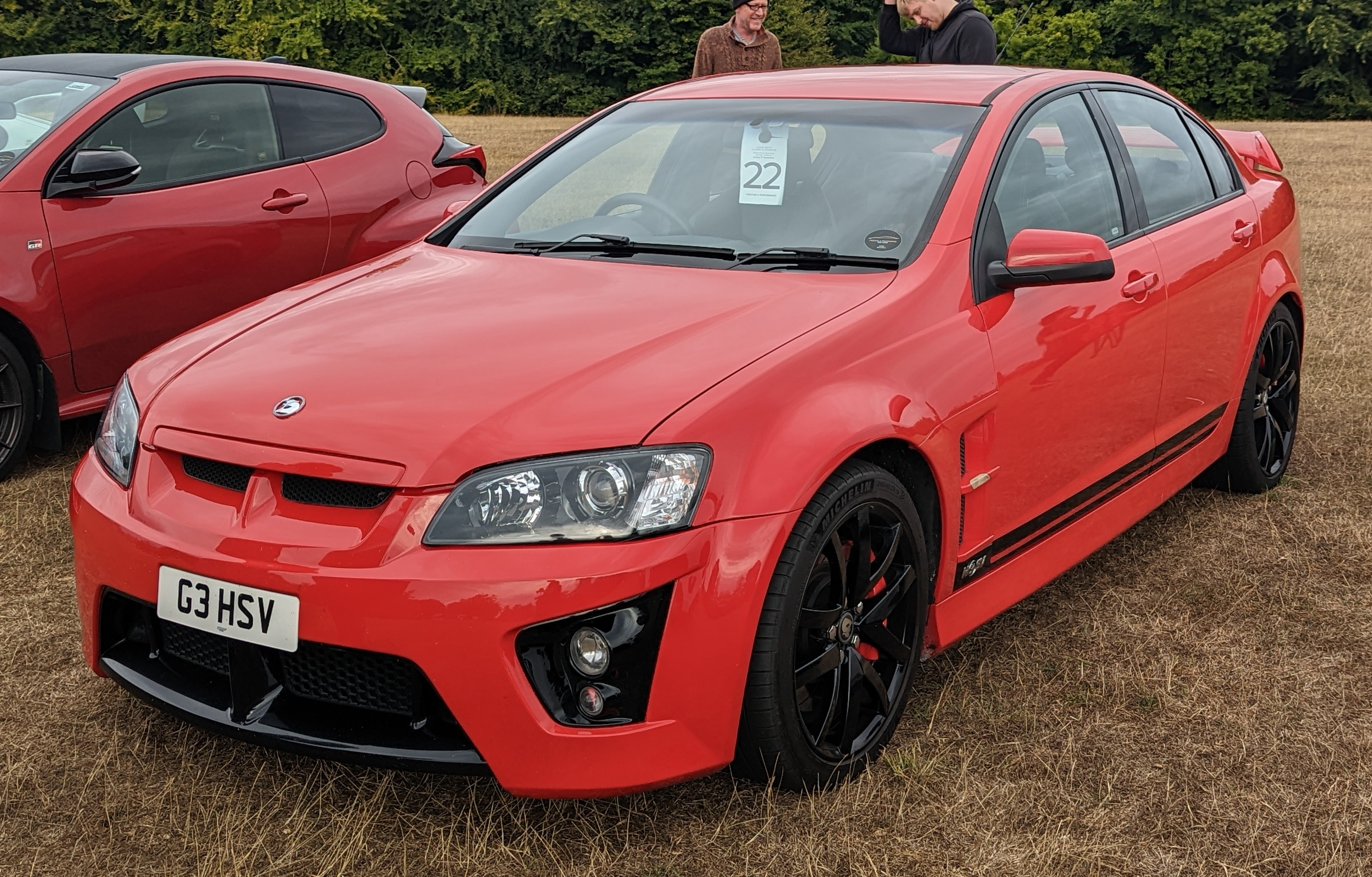
- 2008 Vauxhall VXR8

Overview
- Manufacturer: Holden Special Vehicles
- Also called: Vauxhall VXR8 GTS; HSV ClubSport; HSV GTS
- Production: 2007-2017
- Assembly: Australia: Adelaide, South Australia (Holden Elizabeth Plant); Clayton, Victoria (Holden Special Vehicles)
- Designer: Julian Quincey

Body and chassis
- Class: Executive (E)
- Body style: 4-door sedan 2-door coupé utility
- Layout: Front-engine, rear-wheel drive
- Platform: GM Zeta
- Related: Holden Commodore (VE); Holden Commodore (VF); HSV ClubSport; HSV GTS

Powertrain
- Engine: 6.0 L LS2 V8; 6.2 L LS3 V8; 6.2 L LSA V8; 6.2 L LSA supercharged V8
- Transmission: 6-speed manual

Dimensions
- Wheelbase: 2,915–3,009 mm (114.8–118.5 in)
- Length: 4,966 mm (195.5 in); 5,083 mm (200.1 in) (Maloo)
- Width: 1,898 mm (74.7 in)
- Height: 1,471–1,495 mm (57.9–58.9 in)
- Kerb weight: 1,832 kg (4,039 lb)

Chronology
- Predecessor: Vauxhall Monaro; Vauxhall Omega
- Successor: Vauxhall Insignia GSi

The Vauxhall VXR8 is a full-size performance car sold by Vauxhall in the United Kingdom from 2007 to 2017. The VXR8 was based on the Holden Special Vehicles ClubSport from 2007 to 2009, and Holden Special Vehicles GTS from 2010 to 2017.

== Overview ==
The Vauxhall VXR8 was introduced in 2007, based on the E-Series HSV ClubSport R8, initially powered by a 6.0-litre LS2 V8 at 411 bhp (306 kW), later it was upgraded to the 6.2-litre LS3 V8 at 425 bhp (317 kW).

In 2009, the Vauxhall VXR8 Bathurst and Bathurst S were introduced, named after the Bathurst 1000 race in Australia. The Bathurst was powered by a LS2 at 425 bhp (317 kW), the Bathurst S was powered by a supercharged LS2 at 552 bhp (412 kW).

The Vauxhall VXR8 GTS was introduced in 2010, based on the HSV GTS. It was offered with a LS3 V8 at 436 bhp (325 kW).

In 2013, the VXR8 GTS based on the Gen-F HSV GTS was introduced, with a 6.2-litre LSA at 576 bhp (430 kW). In 2017 15 Vauxhall VXR8 GTS-Rs were fitted with a supercharged LSA V8 at 587 bhp (438 kW). In 2017, the VXR8 was discontinued due to the closure of Holden's Australian factories and discontinuation of the HSV GTS.

Vauxhall VXR8

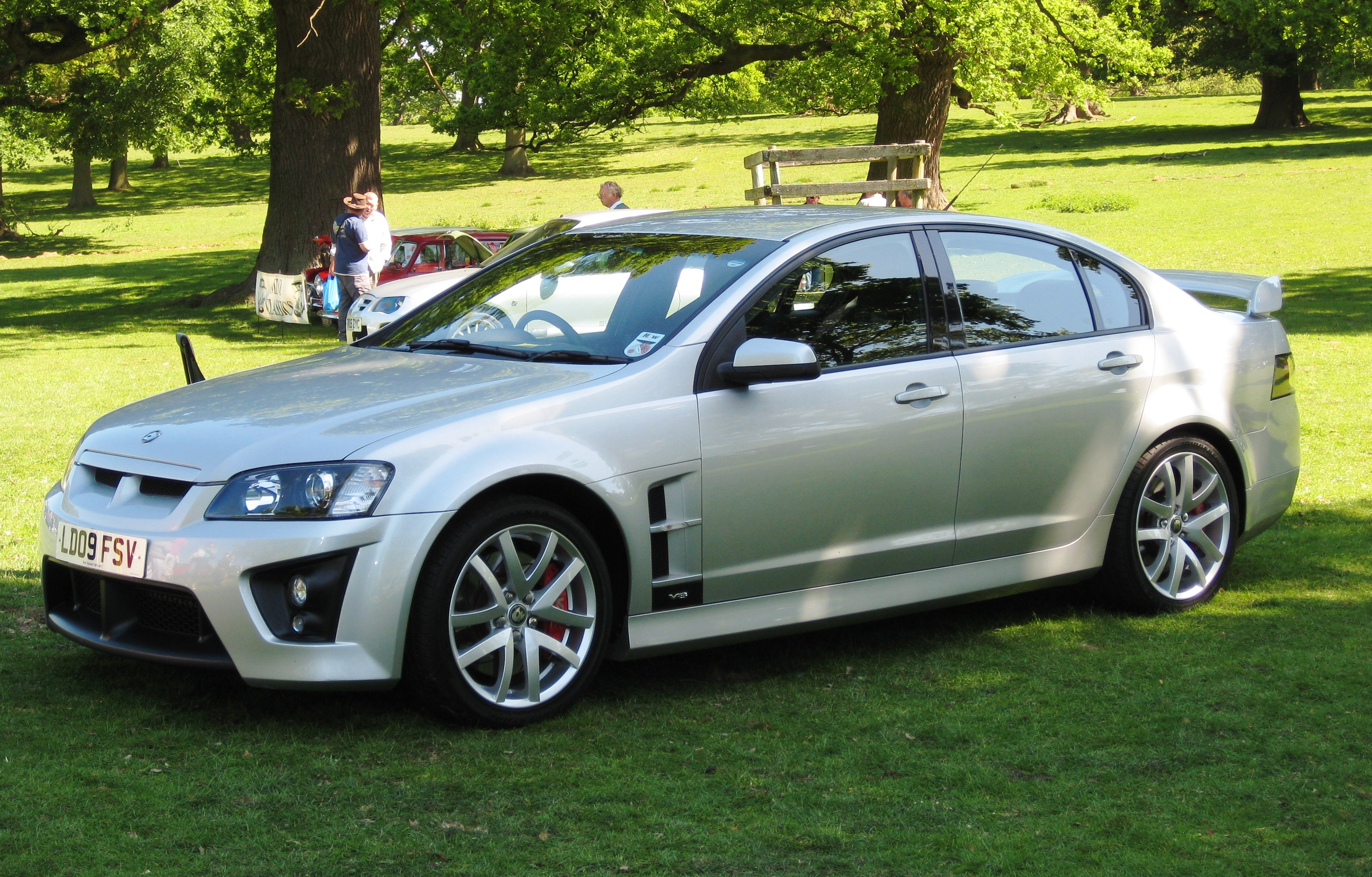
Vauxhall VXR8

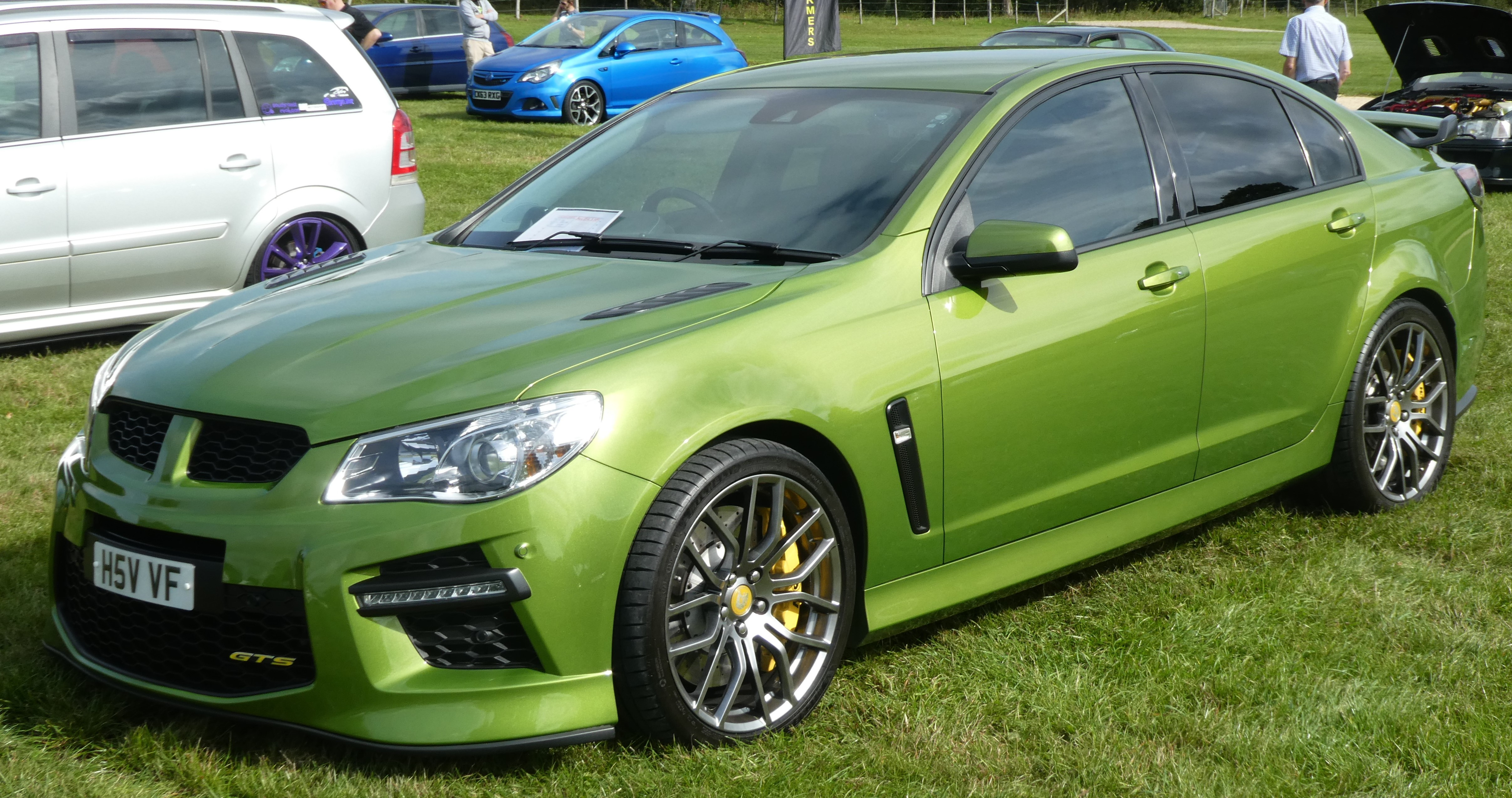
Vauxhall VXR8 GTS

== See also ==
- Holden Special Vehicles Maloo
