= HSV Maloo =

Australian performance coupé utility

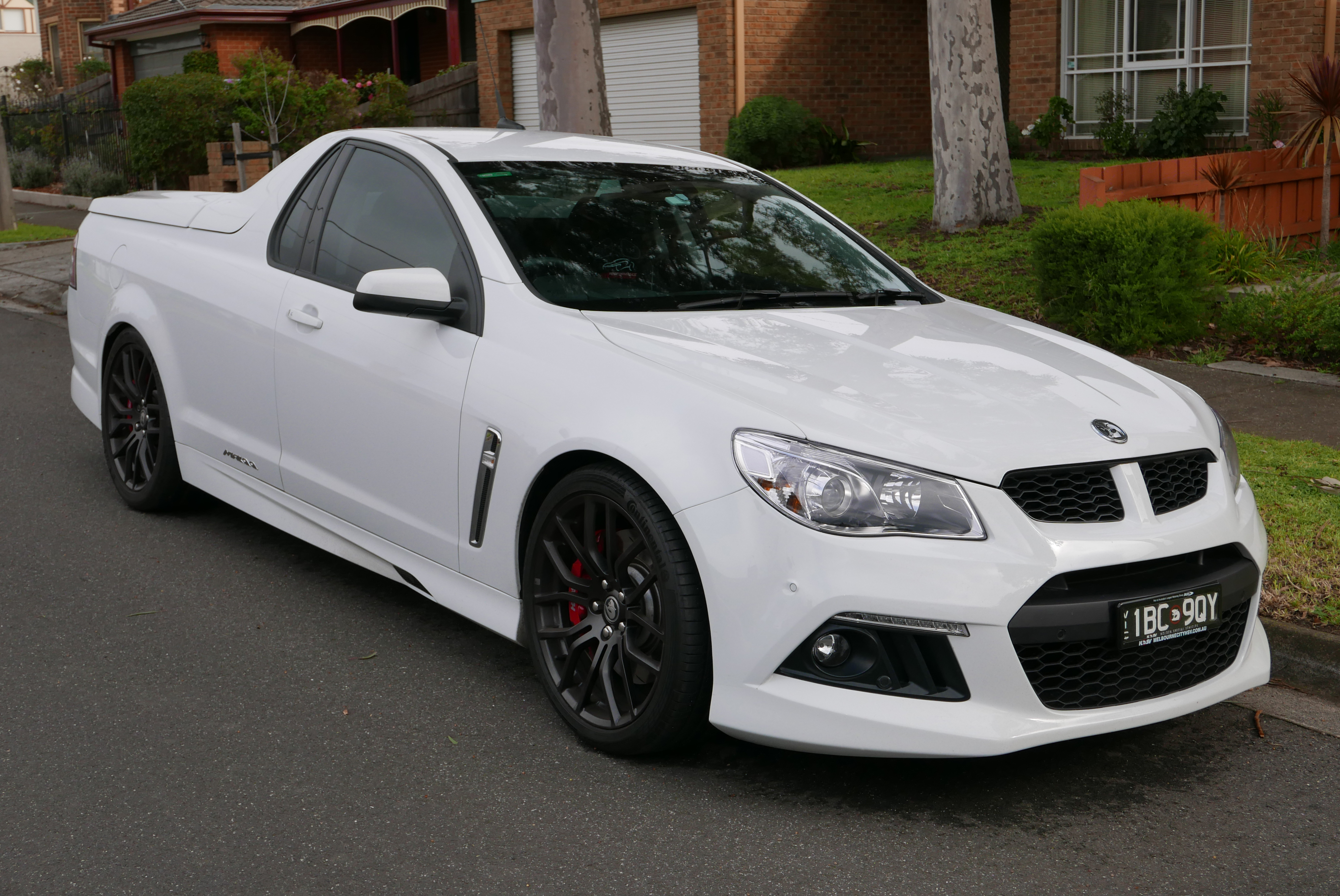
- HSV Maloo R8 (Gen-F)

Overview
- Manufacturer: Holden Special Vehicles
- Also called: Vauxhall Maloo
- Production: 1990–2017

Body and chassis
- Class: Full-size
- Body style: 2-door coupé utility
- Platform: GM V platform (1990–2006); GM Zeta Platform (2007–2017)
- Related: Holden Commodore; Holden Utility; Holden Ute

Powertrain
- Engine: 5.0L 5000i HEC V8; 5.7L LS1 V8; 6.0L LS2 V8; 6.2L LS3 V8; 6.2L LSA supercharged V8; 6.2L LS9 supercharged V8 (GTSR W1)
- Transmission: 5-speed manual; 6-speed manual; 4-speed automatic; 6-speed automatic

Chronology
- Predecessor: Holden Sandman Ute
- Successor: Holden Special Vehicles SportsCat

The HSV Maloo is a performance coupé utility vehicle which was produced by Holden Special Vehicles from 1990 to 2017. As Holden's designated performance vehicle division, Holden Special Vehicles introduced the Maloo model in 1990, based on the Holden Utility (VG), offered with the 5.0-litre Holden V8 engine. The VU Series Maloo was the first with the LS1 engine and introduced the Maloo R8 specification.

In 2006 a Z Series Maloo R8 driven by Mark Skaife set the Guinness World Record for the fastest production utility / pickup truck with an average speed of 271.44 km/h (168.66 mph).

The 'Maloo' name comes from a word in an Aboriginal language for "Storm" or "Thunder".

== History ==
The HSV Maloo was released in October 1990, with the VG Series Maloo. It used a 5.0-litre Holden V8 engine at 180 kW (241 hp), 135 units were produced. In 1992 the VP Series Maloo launched, with the same power. The name 'Maloo' originated from a word in an Aboriginal language for "Storm" or "Thunder".

In 1993, the VR Series Maloo released, with a reworked interior and a 5.0-litre Holden V8 at 185 kW (248 hp). The VS Series was launched in April 1995, in the VS, VS II Series, and 'VS II at VT' the power was unchanged from 185 kW (248 hp). In 1999 the VS III Maloo launched, with a 5.0-litre Holden V8 at 195 kW (261 hp). It was the last car in the Holden Special Vehicles range to use the 5.0-litre Holden V8 engine.

The VU Series Maloo was released in March 2001, with a 5.7-litre LS1 engine at 255 kW (342 hp). The VU series saw the introduction of the HSV Maloo R8 specification, in this series it included a hard tonneau with a spoiler, and 18 inch wheels, while the regular Maloo had a soft tonneau.

In October 2002, the Y Series Maloo launched with a LS1 engine at 260 kW (349 hp). The 'Performance' Brake system came standard on the Maloo, and the "Premium' Brake System standard on the Maloo R8. The Y Series 2 released in October 2003, with a LS1 engine at 285 kW (382 hp). The Z Series Maloo was released in October 2004, with a 6.0-litre LS2 V8 engine at 297 kW (398 hp).

In May 2006 the Z Series HSV Maloo R8 set the Guinness World Record for the fastest production utility / pickup truck. The Maloo was driven by Mark Skaife, in the Woomera Prohibited Area, at 265.72 km/h (165.11 mph) with headwind and 277.16 km/h (172.22 mph) with tailwind for an average speed of 271.44 km/h (168.66 mph), beating the previous world record holder, the Dodge Ram SRT-10 by more than 20 km/h (12 mph). The Z Series Maloo still holds the record as of March 2025.

The E Series Maloo released in October 2007, was only available in the Maloo R8 specification. It was initially offered with a 6.0-litre LS2 engine at 307 kW (412 hp), later transitioning to a 6.2-litre LS3 engine at 317 kW (425 hp) in 2008. The E Series 2 released in August 2009, adding daytime running lights and adding two vents on the bonnet of the Pontiac G8. The E Series 3 released in 2011, it introduced the option of a bi-fuel option using liquid propane injection (LPI) to run on LPG and petrol.

In August 2013 the Gen-F Maloo was released, with a LS3 engine at 317 kW (425 hp), the Maloo R8 with a LS3 at 325 kW (436 hp). The Maloo MY15 had a LS3 at 325 kW (436 hp). Production of the Maloo ended in 2017.

== Special editions ==
The VS series had limited production '10th Anniversary' editions in 'anniversary bronze'.

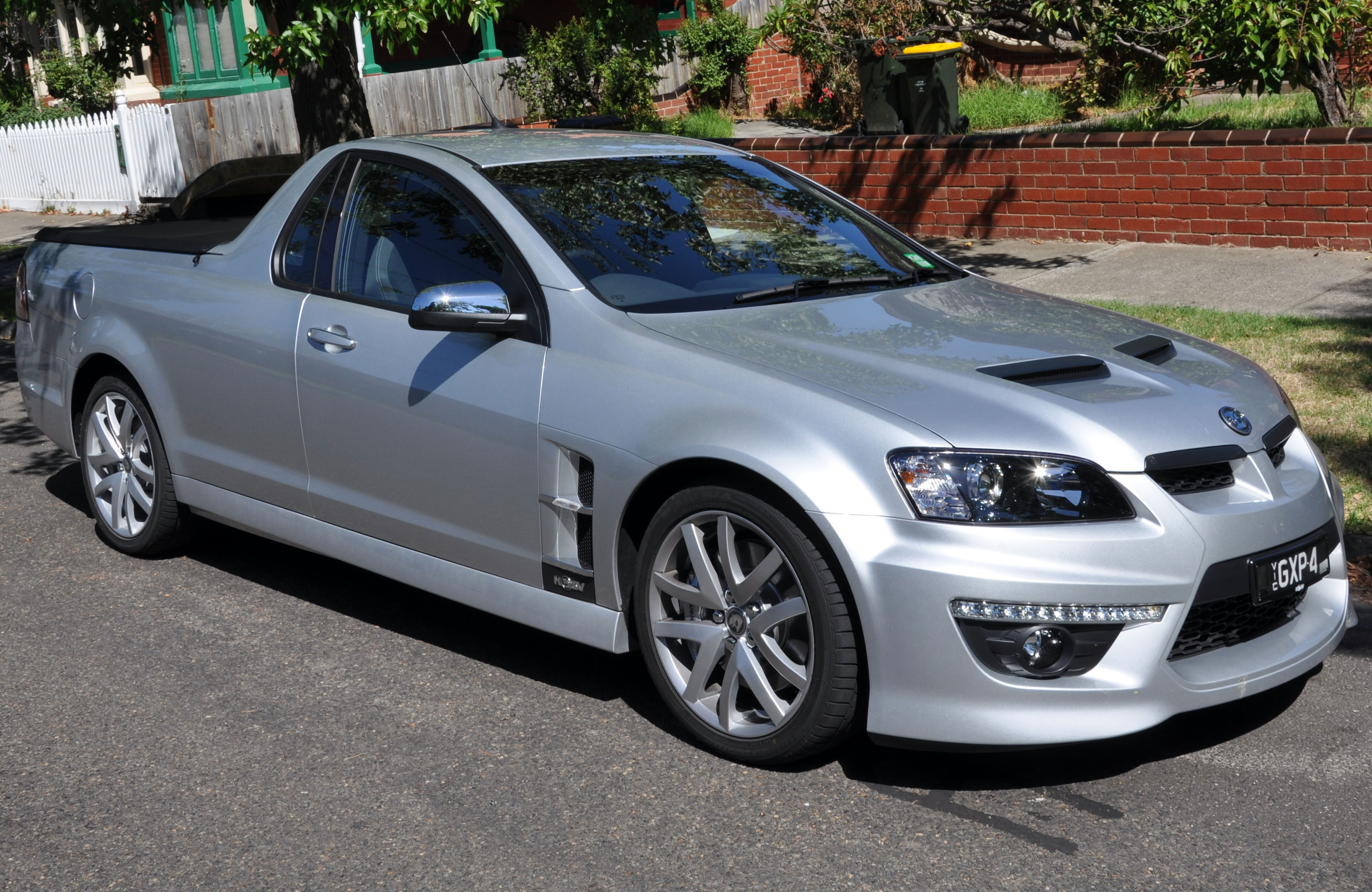
2010 HSV Maloo GXP

In 2010 the '20 Years of Maloo R8' limited edition was released, equipped with; bonnet scoops, 'Vector E' vents on the front guards and bi-model exhaust, blind spot warning system, backup camera, and parking sensors. In 2010 a limited edition Maloo GXP launched, with Pontiac styling with the front bumper and bonnet.

In 2014 the Maloo GTS was released, being powered by a supercharged 6.2-litre LSA engine at 430 kW (577 hp). In 2016 the Maloo R8 SV Black released, having a LS3 at 340 kW (456 hp).

In 2017 the Maloo GTSR released, with a supercharged LSA at 435 kW (583 hp), the Maloo R8 LSA released with a supercharged LSA at 400 kW (536 hp), the Maloo R8 LSA 30th Anniversary with a supercharged LSA at 410 kW (550 hp).

In 2017, a Ute version of the limited production HSV GTSR W1 was launched, with only 4 units total being produced. These were not sold to the public and were instead only sold to select people. The HSV GTSR W1 Maloo was powered by a 6.2-litre supercharged LS9 engine outputting 474 kW (636 hp). The colours of the four units produced are, in build order 000-004: matte metallic grey (Son of a Gun Grey), pale yellow (XU3 Yellah, a nod to the original HSV VS GTSR produced in 1996), gold (Light My Fire) and red (Sting Red). Two extra W1 Maloos were created at a later date, in post-production by Walkinshaw Performance.

== United Kingdom ==
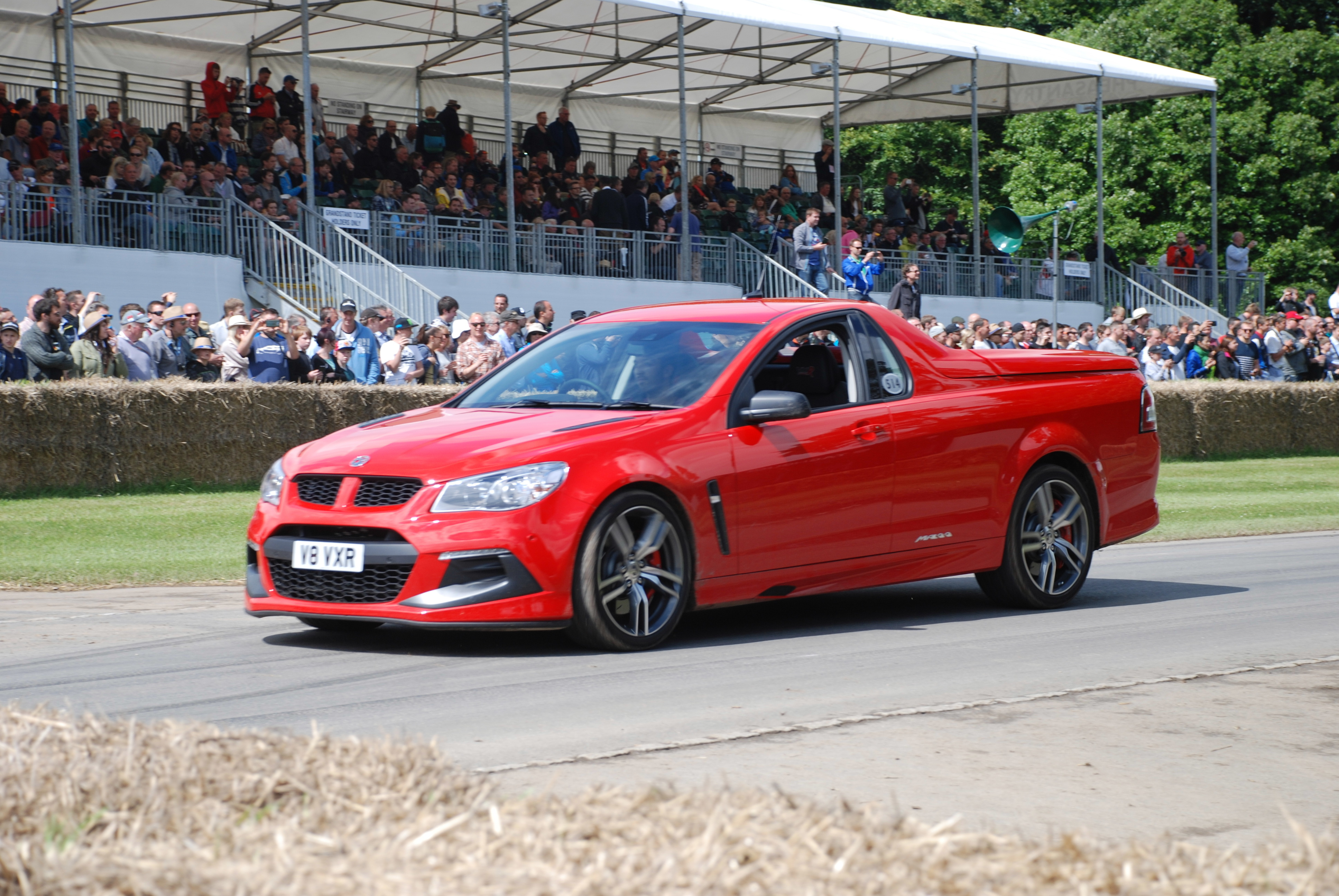
Vauxhall Maloo

In 2011 the E Series Maloo started to be exported to the United Kingdom under Vauxhall's performance division VXR as the Vauxhall Maloo with a LS3 engine at 317 kW (425 hp). In 2017 the Vauxhall VXR8 Maloo LSA was introduced with the 6.2-litre supercharged LSA producing 400 kW (536 hp) and 671 N⋅m (495 lb⋅ft).

== Concepts ==
In 2001 Holden Special Vehicles produced the Maloo-based concept car 'HSV HRT Maloo'. The HRT Maloo concept had a Callaway tuned 6.2-litre LS6 engine at 350 kW (469 hp), 20-inch wheels and a wider body.

In 2003 the 'HSV Maloo Cab Chassis' concept was shown at the 2003 Australian International Motor Show, it was powered by a LS1 producing 260 kW (349 hp). It was a cab chassis model based on the Holden One Tonner.

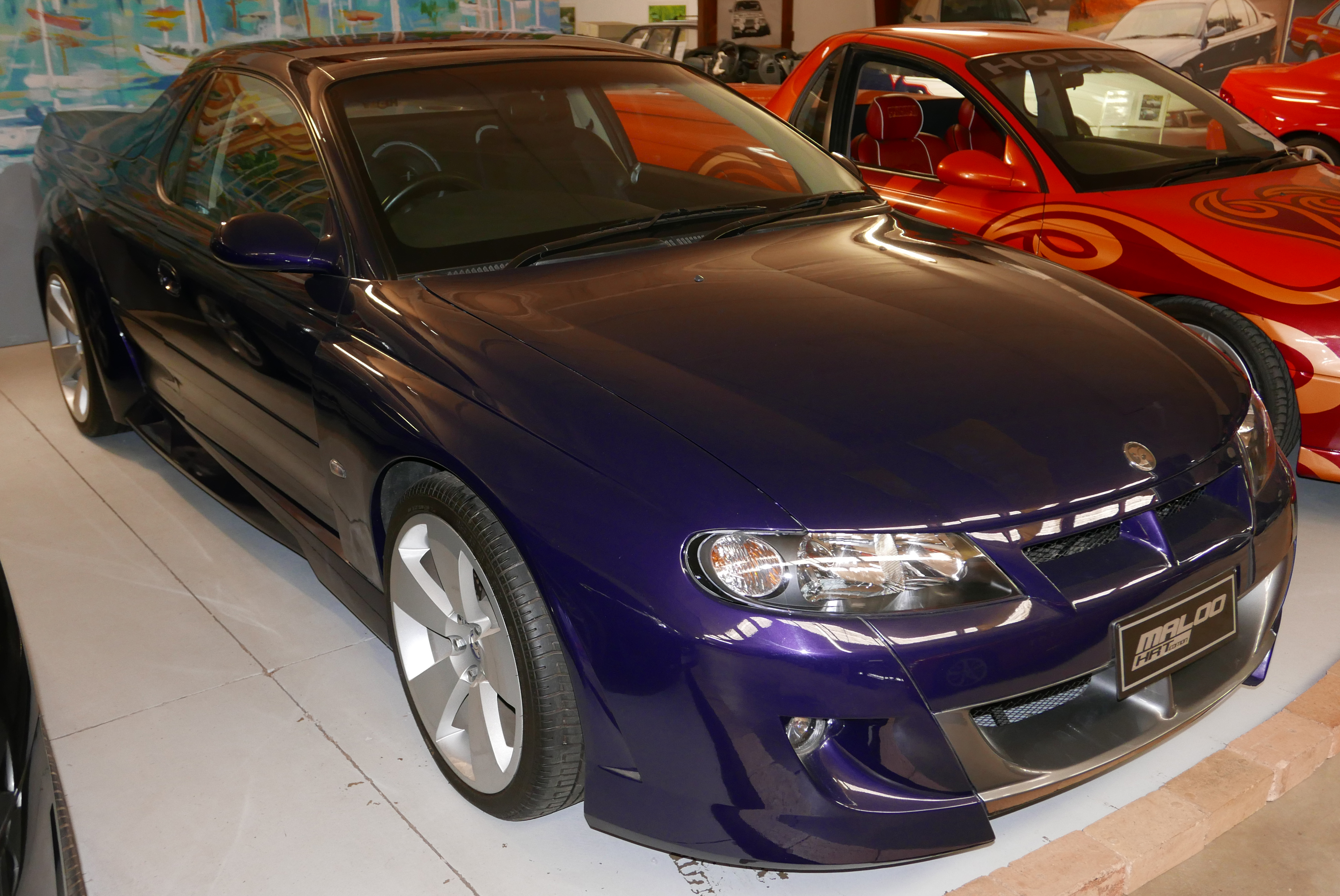
HSV Maloo HRT concept (VU)

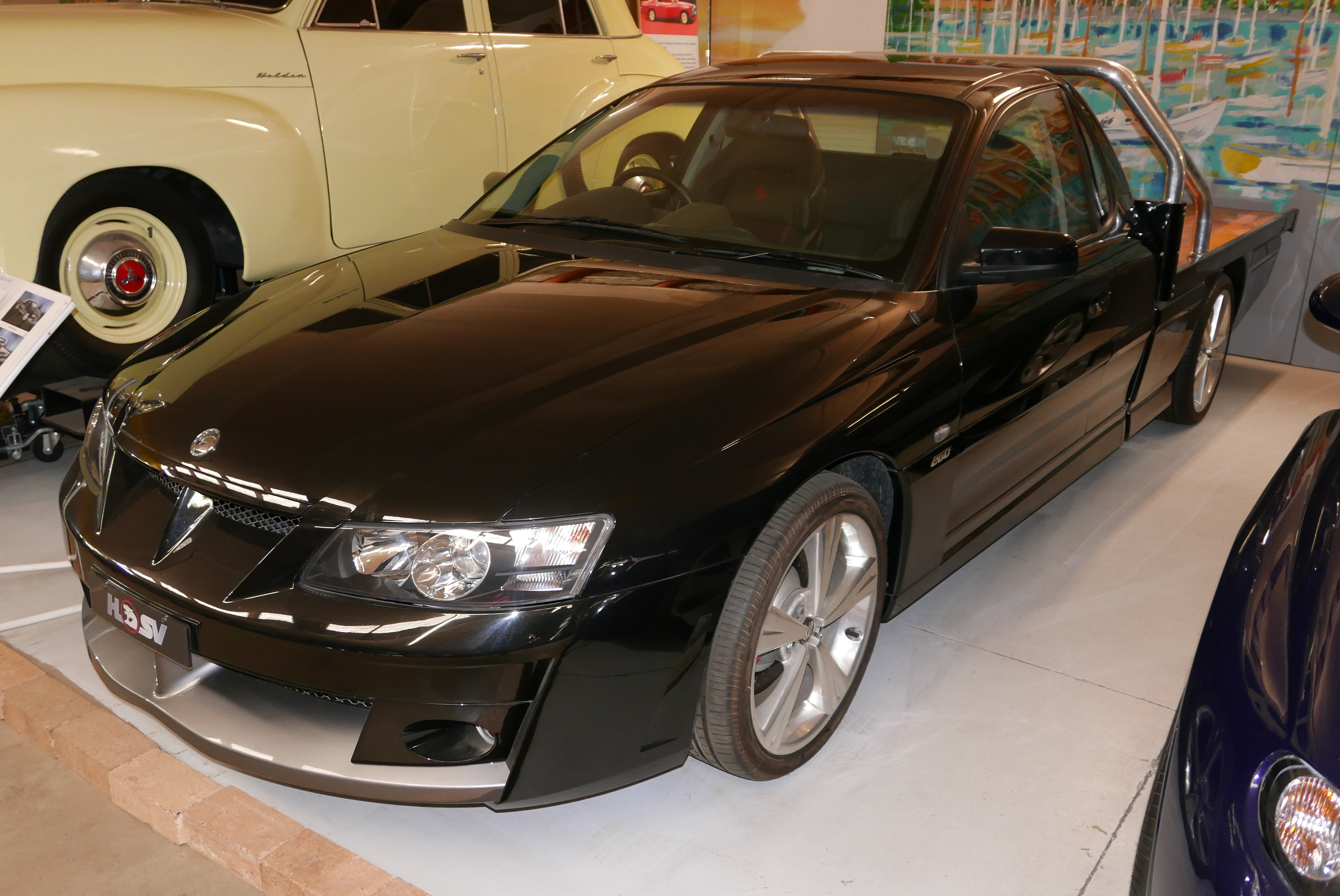
HSV Maloo Cab Chassis (VY)

== Production ==
Holden Special Vehicles Maloo production

Series	Units	Years
VG	132	1990–1992
VP	49	1992–1993
VR	156	1993–1995
VS	?	1995–2000
VU, VU II	301, 483	2000-2002
VY, VY II	499, 673	2002–2004
VZ	1995	2004–2006
VE	1795	2007–2013
VF	?	2013–2017
