= Walkinshaw Performance =

Automotive company

- Industry: Automotive

Walkinshaw Performance is an automotive company involved in motor racing and the production of high performance sporting cars for regular road use. The company was founded by former racing driver, Scottish businessman, Tom Walkinshaw and is essentially a successor organisation to his previous automotive concern, Tom Walkinshaw Racing (TWR) which was driven into bankruptcy by the failure of the Arrows Formula One team, then a part of TWR. Walkinshaw Performance is now operated by Walkinshaw's son, Ryan.

== History ==
When Tom Walkinshaw's global engineering empire TWR went in to receivership, Holden sent over a team of lawyers and representatives to untangle, purchase, and save the Australian division of the business; TWR Australia. This was to preserve Holden's motorsport interests in Australia, as TWR Australia ran the Holden Racing Team alongside the K-Mart Racing Team, later known as the HSV Dealer Team.

V8 Supercars regulations dictated that a manufacturer could not own a race team, so Holden sold the teams off to individual parties. The Holden Racing Team was sold to Mark Skaife, and the K-Mart Racing Team was sold to the Kelly family. TWR Australia as it was known, was rebranded as Holden Motorsport. This was set up to provide maintenance, engineering, and race car construction services to the Holden Racing Team, the K-Mart Racing Team, and Paul Weel Racing.

At the end of 2004, Tom Walkinshaw was named as the new boss at Holden Motorsport. In 2005, Tom Walkinshaw purchased Holden Motorsport and rebranded it to Tom Walkinshaw Performance Group, later shortened to Walkinshaw Performance. It remains the only surviving division of the once empirical TWR.

Walkinshaw was making his return to his involvement in Australian automotive industry initially through Holden Special Vehicles. As was the case with Holden Motorsport beforehand, Walkinshaw Performance took over the construction and maintenance of racing cars for Holden Racing Team (HRT) and the HSV Dealer Team.

After purchasing Elfin Sports Cars, the low volume, high performance sports car maker was added to Walkinshaw Performance in 2006 and slowly revitalised its Holden based designs. 2007 saw partial ownership of Holden Racing Team return to Walkinshaw Performance. WP's involvement with HSV Dealer Team ceased when the Kelly family took their Racing Entitlements Contracts and set-up Kelly Racing at the end of 2008 after purchasing much of Perkins Engineering. At the same time WP acquired the rest of HRT from Skaife Sports and Dillon Racing to set up a new two car team titled Walkinshaw Racing which began operation at the start of 2009.

In addition to the vehicle construction businesses, Walkinshaw Performance also builds add-on performance parts for vehicles based on the Holden Commodore platform in the guises of Holdens, HSVs, Pontiacs and Vauxhalls, as well as performance parts for Hummers.

In August 2016, Holden announced it would consolidate its sponsorship of the Supercars Championship at Triple Eight Race Engineering. This saw HRT brand transfer to Triple Eight Race Engineering in 2017 with the two HRT cars entered under a revived Walkinshaw Racing brand.

== 4WD and truck market ==
With the closing of Holden in Australia, and the Walkinshaw Group subsequently becoming heavily involved with the conversion of LHD to RHD of large American trucks such as Silverado, as well as various re-engineering projects for other vehicle manufacturing companies, Walkinshaw Performance also turned their skills to the 4x4 market. Working on models such as Silverado, RAM DS and VW Amarok, they have produced superchargers, headers, cat & lifts, as well as towing accessories. Walkinshaw Performance have also tested their skills in 2022 by entering 2 vehicles in the AORC events.

== W-series models ==
The model number refers to power in kW

- W375
- W407
- W457
- W497
- W507
- W547
- W557
