= General Motors Zeta platform =

GM Zeta platform
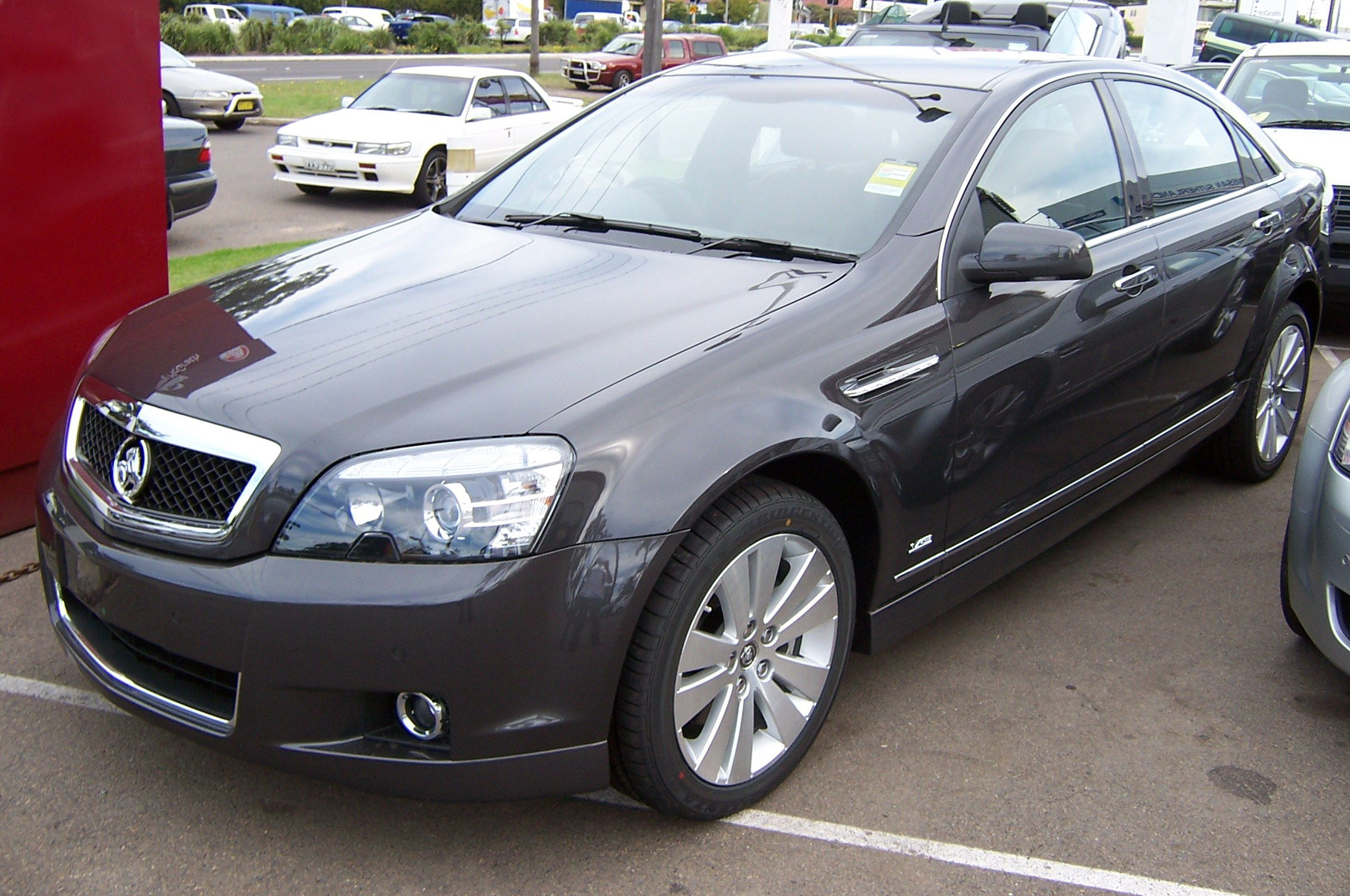
- Holden Caprice (WM)

Overview
- Manufacturer: Holden (General Motors)
- Also called: Global RWD Architecture
- Production: 2006–2017

Body and chassis
- Class: Full-size
- Body styles: 2-door coupe 2-door convertible 2-door coupé utility 4-door sedan 5-door Station wagon

Chronology
- Predecessor: GM B platform ( for the 4th generation Caprice for the police in North America); GM V platform (RWD); GM F platform (for the Chevrolet Camaro)
- Successor: GM Alpha platform (for the Chevrolet Camaro); GM Epsilon platform (for the Holden Commodore); GM Omega platform (RWD) (Full Size)

Zeta was the original name for General Motors' full-size rear-wheel drive automobile platform developed by GM's Australian subsidiary company Holden and was at one stage referred to as the "GM Global RWD Architecture". The GM Zeta platform replaced the V-body, and debuted with 2006 Holden Commodore (VE) sedan and Holden (VE) Ute. This platform was considered as the replacement for the North American W, H, and K platforms until plans were cancelled due to fuel-economy considerations and GM's financial situation. Although the future of the Zeta program was in doubt at that time, in May 2009, Holden began the development of an improved second version of the platform that went on to form the basis of the 2013 Commodore (VF) and Chevrolet SS.

The 2010-15 fifth generation Chevrolet Camaro was the only Zeta platform model produced in North America. All other Zeta platform vehicles have been manufactured in Australia by Holden. In 2016, the Chevrolet Camaro (sixth generation) debuted on the GM Alpha platform.

Australian manufactured models include the long-wheelbase Holden WM Statesman/Caprice sedan and the high performance range produced by Holden Special Vehicles. On export markets, Holden-based models included the:

- short-wheelbase Commodore (VE)-based Pontiac G8 and the Commodore (VF)-based Chevrolet SS (for North America)
- full HSV range (for New Zealand and Singapore), the HSV-based Vauxhall VXR8 (for the United Kingdom) and Chevrolet Specialised Vehicles (CSV) E-series (for the Middle East)
- the long-wheelbase Chevrolet Caprice PPV and the Buick Park Avenue (the latter exported to China as a Complete knock down (CKD) kit).

In December 2013, Holden announced that it would cease its local production by 2017 and, with it, the production of the GM Zeta platform. Production ended in October 2017.

== Development ==
Development was started in late 1999 by Holden to replace the aging V-body platform underpinning the third generation Commodore that debuted in 1997, after Opel announced that its Omega (on which the Commodore was based) would be discontinued. Principal development on the VE Commodore was completed by July 2004 at a cost approaching A$1 billion and the first testing mules underwent trials later that year. Unlike previous Holden platforms, the platform was designed around the LWB Caprice and Statesman initially and then shortened to create the Commodore. General Motors global corporate headquarters was impressed by the VE design and began studies on using the underlying architecture (internally christened Zeta by GM engineers) for a range of future products on a global scale. After the cancellation of the plan due to the fuel-economy considerations and GM's financial situation, the idea of Zeta as a global rear drive platform was revived with plans for the fifth generation Chevrolet Camaro of 2010.

== Features ==
The Zeta architecture was designed for great flexibility and could accommodate a wide variety of automotive features such as wheelbase length, ride height, windshield rake and roof line. Zeta's suspension system was all wheel independent and uses a MacPherson strut coupled with a dual ball joint lower A-arm for the front and a four link independent setup for the rear wheels. The engine was mounted slightly behind the front axle giving improved weight distribution.

== Further development ==
In May 2009, Holden began the re-engineering of the Zeta platform to create a lighter, stronger, better handling and more fuel efficient version. The improved second version of the platform formed the basis of the 2013 Commodore (VF), which also spawned the 2013 Chevrolet SS that GM announced in May 2012 for the US market. This Chevrolet made its debut at the 2013 Daytona Shootout. The Holden VF Commodore, on which the Chevrolet SS is based, went on sale the same day in Australia.

== End of production ==
In December 2013, Holden announced the planned termination of its manufacturing operations at the Elizabeth plant in South Australia by the end of 2017 and, with it, that of the Zeta platform. Sigma-based vehicles that shared design engineering with Zeta transitioned to the Alpha platform, which had used Zeta as its design inspiration. The Chevrolet Camaro, the only GM Zeta based car manufactured outside of Australia, transitioned from the Zeta platform to the Alpha platform in November 2015, with the launch of the 2016 sixth generation model.

== Vehicles ==
The vehicles that have used the Zeta platform include:

- 2006–2013 Holden VE Commodore / 2007–2012 Bitter Vero Sport / 2006–2013 HSV E Series / 2007–2013 Vauxhall VXR8 and CSV equivalents / 2007–2011 Chevrolet Lumina / 2008–2009 Pontiac G8 / 2006–2008; 2010–2011 Chevrolet Omega
- 2006–2013 Holden WM Statesman/Caprice / 2014–2017 Holden WN Caprice / 2007–2012 Bitter Vero / 2007–2017 Chevrolet Caprice / 2008–2010 Daewoo Veritas / 2007–2012 Buick Park Avenue / 2006–2013 HSV E-Series Grange / 2014–2017 HSV Gen-F Grange
- 2007–2017 Holden Ute
- 2008 Holden Coupe 60 concept car
- 2010–2015 Chevrolet Camaro
- 2007–2017 Chevrolet Caprice
- 2013–2017 Holden VF Commodore / Chevrolet SS / HSV Gen-F Series.

== See also ==
- List of General Motors platforms
