= HSV Grange =

Australian luxury performance car

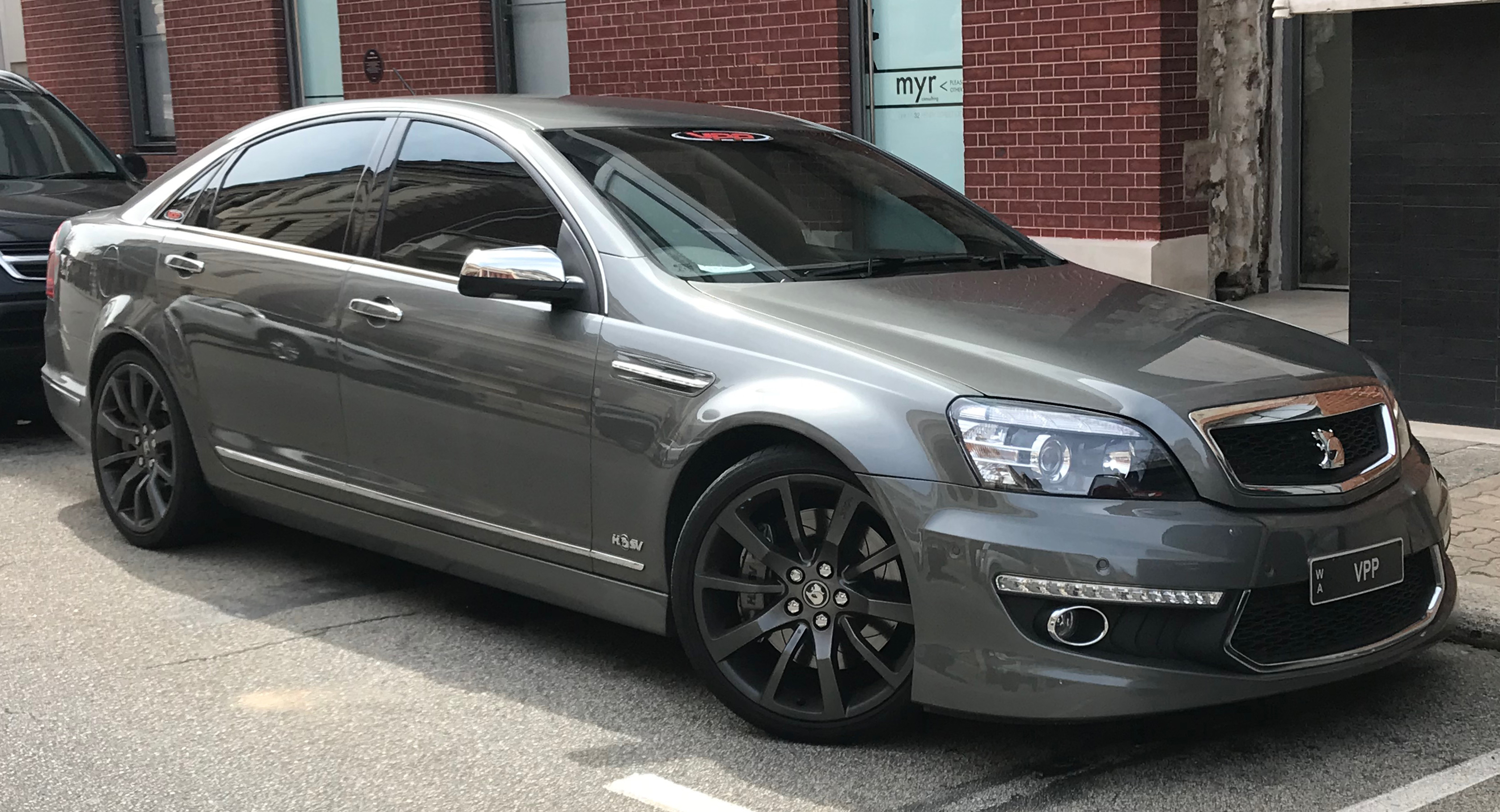
- 2015 HSV Grange (WN)

Overview
- Manufacturer: Holden Special Vehicles
- Production: 1996–2016
- Assembly: Australia: Clayton, Victoria

Body and chassis
- Class: Full-size car
- Body style: 4-door sedan
- Platform: GM V platform (1996–2006); GM Zeta Platform (2006–2016)
- Related: Holden Caprice

Powertrain
- Engine: 5.0L '5000i' HEC V8; 5.7L HSV stroker V8; 3.8L L67 supercharged V6; 5.7L 'LS1' V8; 6.0L 'LS2' V8; 6.2L 'LS3' V8

The HSV Grange is a performance full-size luxury sedan built by Holden's designated performance vehicle division Holden Special Vehicles from 1996 to 2016.

== History ==
In October 1996 the HSV Grange released, VS II Series-based on the Holden VS Caprice. The Grange 185i was offered with a 5.0-litre Holden V8 engine at 185 kW (248.1 hp), with the Grange 215i with a 5.7-litre stroker Holden V8 at 215 kW (288 hp).

The WH Series Grange released in 1999, offered with a supercharged 3.8-litre Buick V6 engine V6 at 180 kW (241 hp) or a 5.7-litre LS1 V8 at 250 kW (335 hp). In October 2000 the Supercharged V6 was dropped, and the power of the LS1 increased to 255 kW (342 hp). The WHII Series Grange released in September 2001, with a LS1 at 255 kW (342 hp).

The WK Series Grange released in September 2003, with a LS1 at 285 kW (382 hp). In September 2004 the WL Series Grange released, with a 6.0-litre LS2 at 297 kW (398 hp).

The WM Series Grange released in May 2007, with a LS2 at 307 kW (412 hp), later transiting to a 6.2-litre LS3 at 317 kW (425 hp). The WM III Grange released in September 2010, with LS3 at 325 kW (436 hp), a bi-fuel option using liquefied petroleum gas and petrol was also introduced. The WN Series Grange released in 2013, with a LS3 at 340 kW (456 hp). The limited production 'Grange SV' released in 2016. The HSV Grange ended production in 2016.
