= Holden Special Vehicles =

Former Australian performance division of Holden

- Type: Private
- Industry: Automotive
- Founded: 15 October 1987
- Founder: Tom Walkinshaw
- Defunct: 18 August 2020
- Successor: General Motors Specialty Vehicles (GMSV)
- Headquarters: Clayton, Victoria
- Products: Automobiles
- Owners: Walkinshaw Group, Holden
- Website: www.hsv.com.au

Holden Special Vehicles (HSV) was the performance division for the Australian car brand Holden, based in Clayton, Victoria and established in 1987 as a joint venture between Holden and Tom Walkinshaw Racing. It was shut down in 2020, with General Motors Specialty Vehicles as its successor.

It modified Holden models, including standard wheelbase Commodore, long wheelbase Caprice and Statesman, and commercial Ute for domestic and export sale, all of which were imported from the main Holden Elizabeth Plant. HSV had also modified other non-Holden cars within the General Motors lineup in low volumes.

HSV exported models to New Zealand and Singapore without rebranding, in the United Kingdom models were rebadged as the Vauxhall VXR8 and the Middle East as the Chevrolet Special Vehicles CR8.

== History ==
In 1987 Holden and Tom Walkinshaw Racing established the joint venture Holden Special Vehicles (HSV). It replaced Holden Dealer Team (HDT), after Holden severed ties with it and Peter Brock due to the controversy surrounding the Energy Polarizer.

The first car developed by HSV was the Holden VL Commodore SS Group A SV of 1988, which was badged and sold by Holden for Group A touring car racing homologation purposes. It went on to win the 1990 Bathurst 1000 race. The first car badged as a HSV was the SV88.

HSV initially used a facility in 1987 in Notting Hill, Victoria, starting vehicle production that July, and later moving to one in Clayton previously used by Nissan Motor Australia in December 1994. In 2018 Walkinshaw Automotive Group, including HSV moved to another facility, also in Clayton.

HSV ceased production of the Holden Caprice–based Grange in 2016. Holden Commodore-based models ceased production in 2017.

In mid-2018 HSV began converting (re-manufacturing) the Chevrolet Camaro 2SS coupe and Chevrolet Silverado 2500HD pickup truck from left-hand-drive to right-hand-drive to GM's factory standards. The vehicles were sold with a factory warranty via the existing HSV-Holden dealership network. It boosted job numbers from 130 to 150 staff in order to cope with production ramping up.

On 18 August 2020 General Motors announced the closure of Holden Special Vehicles and its replacement by General Motors Specialty Vehicles (GMSV). GMSV imports and distributes the Silverado in the Australasia region beginning in November 2020.

== Nameplates ==
The following is an alphabetical listing of the most notable and popular nameplates used by Holden Special Vehicles.

Avalanche

The HSV Avalanche is an all-wheel drive crossover SUV that was produced from 2003 to 2005. Based on the Holden Adventra LX8 crossover wagon, the Avalanche range also incorporated a dual-cab utility model known as the Avalanche XUV, derived from the Holden Crewman Cross8. The Avalanche has been built over the following series:

- VY (2003–2005)
- VZ (2005)

ClubSport

The HSV ClubSport is a full size sports sedan that has represented the brand's highest volume seller since its introduction in 1990. It was based on the mainstream Commodore range and has been the entry-level HSV model except between 1995 and 1998, when that role was filled by the Manta range. In 1999, HSV introduced a higher specification known as the "R8". The Clubsport has been built over the following series:

- VN (1990–1991)
- VP (1991–1993)
- VR (1993–1995)
- VS (1995–1997)
- VT (1997–2000)
- VX (2000–2002)
- VY (2002–2004)
- VZ (2004–2006)
- VE (2006–2013)
- VF (2013–2017)

Coupé

The HSV Coupé is a high performance grand tourer that was produced from 2001 to 2006. It was based on the Holden Monaro, the Coupé adaptation of the third generation Holden Commodore. Its standard model range included the GTO and GTS. In 2004, the GTS was discontinued and the all-wheel drive Coupé4 introduced. Limited edition models included the GTO LE (2003 and 2006) and GTO Signature (2006). The Coupé has been built over the following series:

- V2 (2001–2002)
- V2 II (2002–2004)
- VZ (2004–2006)

Grange

The HSV Grange is a full size sedan and it was based on the luxury Holden Statesman and Caprice twins. The Grange has represented the HSV brand's most top-of-the-line, luxury offering to date. Since 1997, this nameplate has replaced both the HSV Statesman and Caprice models. The Grange has been built over the following series:

- VS (1997–1999)
- WH (1999–2003)
- WK (2003–2004)
- WL (2004–2006)
- WM (2006–2013)
- WN (2013–2016)

GTS

The HSV GTS is a full size high performance sedan that was based on the mainstream Commodore range. Excluding the special V6-engined editions sold in New Zealand in the VN and VP series, the proper and original V8-engined GTS was introduced in Australia in 1992 with the VP series. The GTS has represented the HSV brand's most powerful offering to date. With the exception of the Z Series, when it was not part of the range, the GTS has been built over the following series:

- In 1990, HSV built special V6-engined GTS models for New Zealand in the VN and VP series.
- VP (1991–1993)
- VR (1993–1995)
- VS (1995–1997)
- VT (1997–2000)
- VX (2000–2002)
- VY (2002–2004)
- VE (2006–2013)
- VF (2013–2017)

Maloo

The HSV Maloo is a performance utility that has been produced since 1990 and was based on the Holden Ute. Its distinguishing features have been high-performance V8 engines and full body kits. The name "Maloo" means "thunder" in an Aboriginal language. It is said that former HSV managing director, John Crennan, coined the name for the vehicle after reading a book on Aboriginal Australians.

In 2001, HSV introduced a higher "R8" specification. In June 2006, a regular production Z Series Maloo R8 broke the record for the world's fastest production performance pickup, at 271 km/h, (168 mph) beating the previous record holder, a Dodge Ram SRT-10 by 22 km/h.

The Maloo has been built over the following series:

- VG (1990–1991)
- VP (1991–1993)
- VR (1993–1995)
- VS (1995–2000)
- VU (2000–2002)
- VY (2002–2004)
- VZ (2004–2007)
- VE (2007–2013)
- VF (2013–2017)

The most powerful and developed version was the Gen-F 430 kW GTS Maloo, which was launched in November 2014. It featured GTS sedan mechanicals except for the Magnetic Ride Control suspension setup that, due to limited development opportunities, HSV left exclusively for the GTS sedan, Senator Signature and Grange. This Maloo was originally limited to 165 units, later increased to 250 plus 10 for export to New Zealand.

Manta

The HSV Manta is a full-size sports sedan, and wagon (VS series) that was first introduced in April 1995, Discontinued November 1998. It was established as the entry-level HSV model below the ClubSport, it was eventually dropped due to poor sales performance. The Manta was built over the following series:

- VS (1995–1997)
- VT (1997–1998)

Senator

The HSV Senator is a full size luxury sports sedan that was first introduced in 1992. It was based on the Holden Berlina and Calais twins. From 1997, HSV offered a wagon variant (based solely on the Berlina, since the Calais was never built in that body shape) and a higher specification model known as the "Senator Signature". The Senator has been built over the following series:

- VP (1992–1993)
- VR (1993–1995)
- VS (1995–1997)
- VT (1997–2000)
- VX (2000–2002)
- VY (2002–2004)
- VZ (2004–2006)
- VE (2006–2013)
- VF (2013–2017)

SV88

The HSV SV88 was the first car to bear the HSV badge and was designed to compete against HDT's luxury performance Director model car. The SV88 was launched in 1988 and based on the VL Series luxury Calais.

SV91

- VP (1991–1992)

W427

The HSV W427 was a limited edition flagship based on the E Series, which was released to celebrate the company's 20th anniversary in 2008. It was also a car produced to address the public disappointment caused by HSV canning its ambitious HRT 427 project previewed in 2002. It was powered by a 7,011 cc (7.0 L; 427.8 cu in) LS7 V8 engine rated at 375 kW (510 PS; 503 bhp) at 6500 rpm and 640 N⋅m (472 lb⋅ft) at 5000 rpm of torque.

XU6

The XU6 was a supercharged V6 model, it was an entry-level model in the HSV range, produced from 1998 to 2002.

- VT (1998–2000)
- VX (2000–2002)

== Holden-based models by series ==
=== VL ===
The Holden VL Commodore SS Group A SV was the first car produced by HSV, It released in 1988. It produced 180 kW (241 hp) and 380 N⋅m (280 lb⋅ft). All produced in 'Panorama Silver'. The VL Group A SS was also the first model to feature a fuel-injected version of the Holden V8. It was built as a homologation, and sold as a Holden.

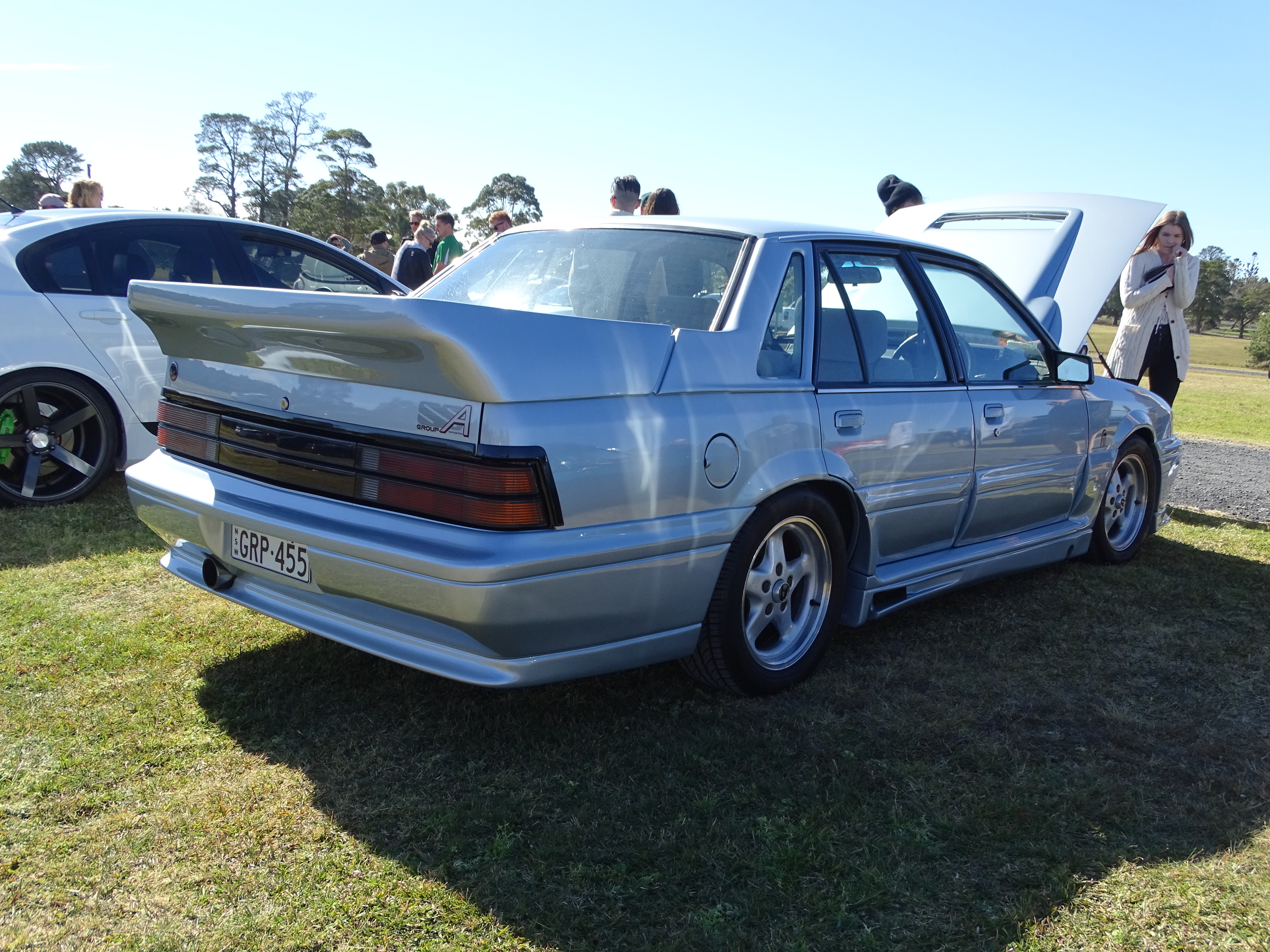
Holden VL Commodore SS Group A SV

The SV88 was based on the Holden Calais (VL). It used a carburetored Holden V8 producing 136 kW (182 hp) and 355 N⋅m (262 lb⋅ft). It was the first car under the HSV marque. The SV F20 was powered by the turbocharged 3.0-litre Nissan RB30 producing 150 kW (201 hp) and 296 N⋅m (218 ft⋅lb) of torque. Only 2 units were produced, instead of the 20 planned.

The range of vehicles for this series included (in chronological order):

- Commodore SS Group A SV (badged as a Holden for racing homologation)
- SV88
- SV F20

=== VN/VG/VQ ===
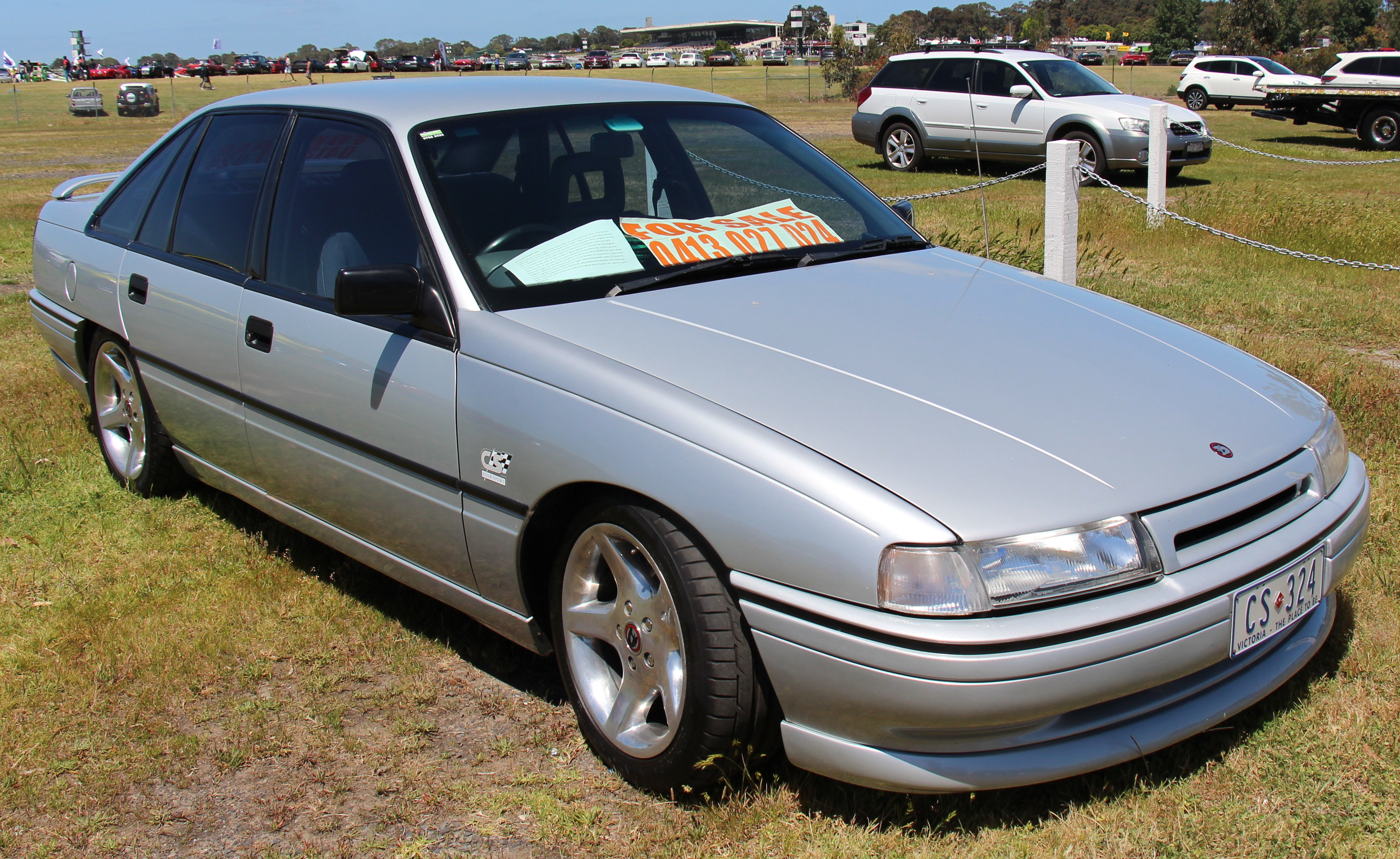
Clubsport (VN)

The VN series released in 1988. The VN Commodore SS Group A SV produced 215 kW (288 hp), 302 of the originally planend 500 units were produced. The SV3800 was powered by a 3.8-litre V6 producing 132 kW (177 hp). In 1990 the Maloo was introduced, based on the Holden Utility (VG). In 1900 the Clubsport was introduced.

The VN series also spawned HSV V6-engined regional models, which are less known and widely based on Holden Commodore models with HSV add-ons.

The range of vehicles for this series included (in alphabetical order):

- Challenger (special V6 built for Canberra dealers)
- ClubSport
- DMG90 (special V6 build for Queensland dealers)
- GTS V6 (New Zealand export)
- LS (VN sedan and wagon – wagon only available in New Zealand)
- LS (VG V6 utility)
- Maloo
- Statesman 5000i
- Statesman 5000i
- Statesman SV90
- Statesman SV93
- SV LE
- SV89
- SV3800
- SV5000
- SV T-30
- 8-Plus
- Holden Commodore SS Group A SV (badged as a Holden for racing homologation)

=== VP ===
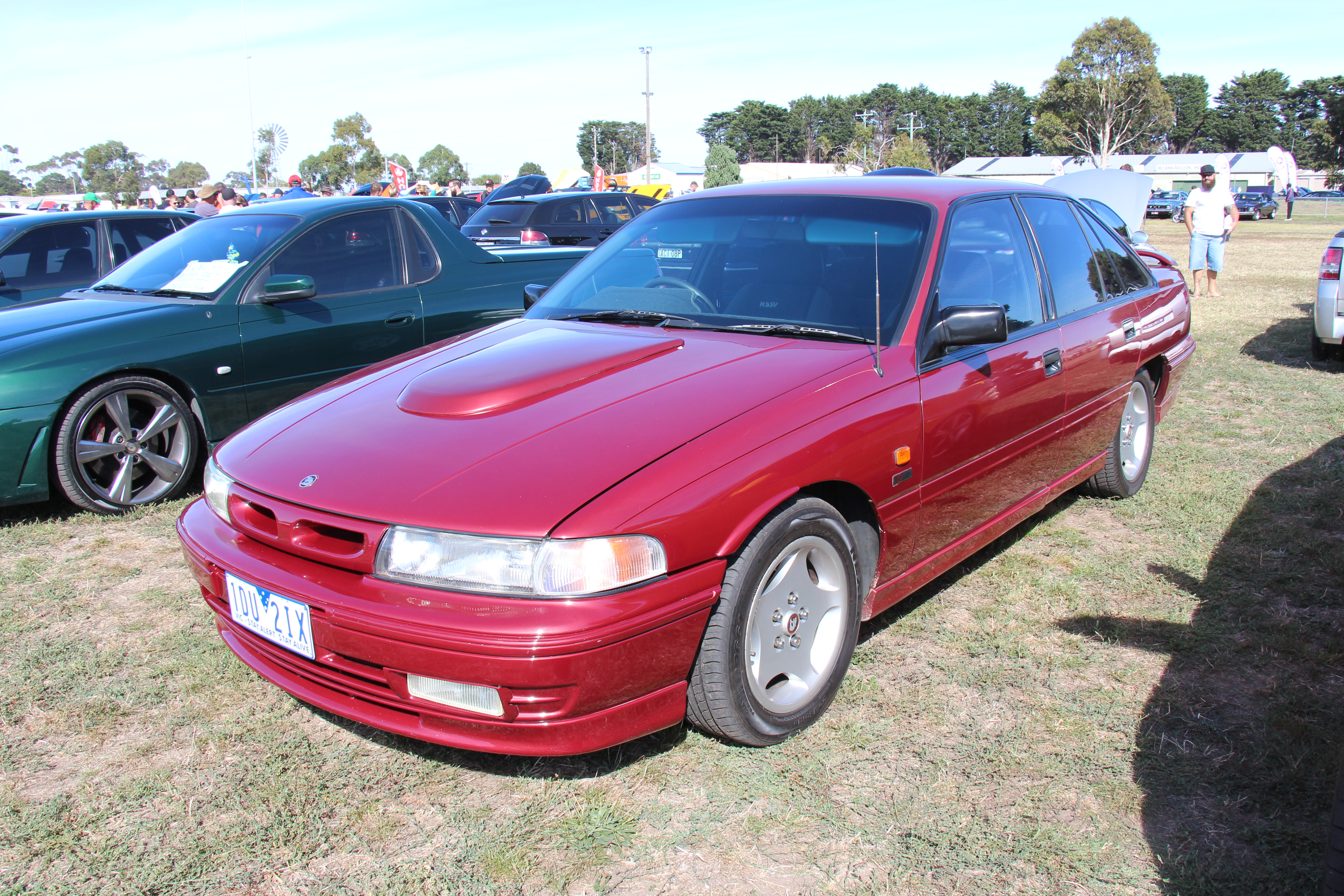
Clubsport (VP)

The VP Series was released in 1992. The Senator and GTS were introduced. The ClubSport and Senator produced 180 kW (241 hp). The GTS, ClubSport 500i, and Senator 5000i produced 200 kW (268 hp).

- ClubSport
- Clubsport 5000i
- Sport Wagon.
- GTS
- Maloo
- Senator
- Senator 5000i
- SV91
- Nitron
- Formula
- HSV+6

=== VR/VS ===
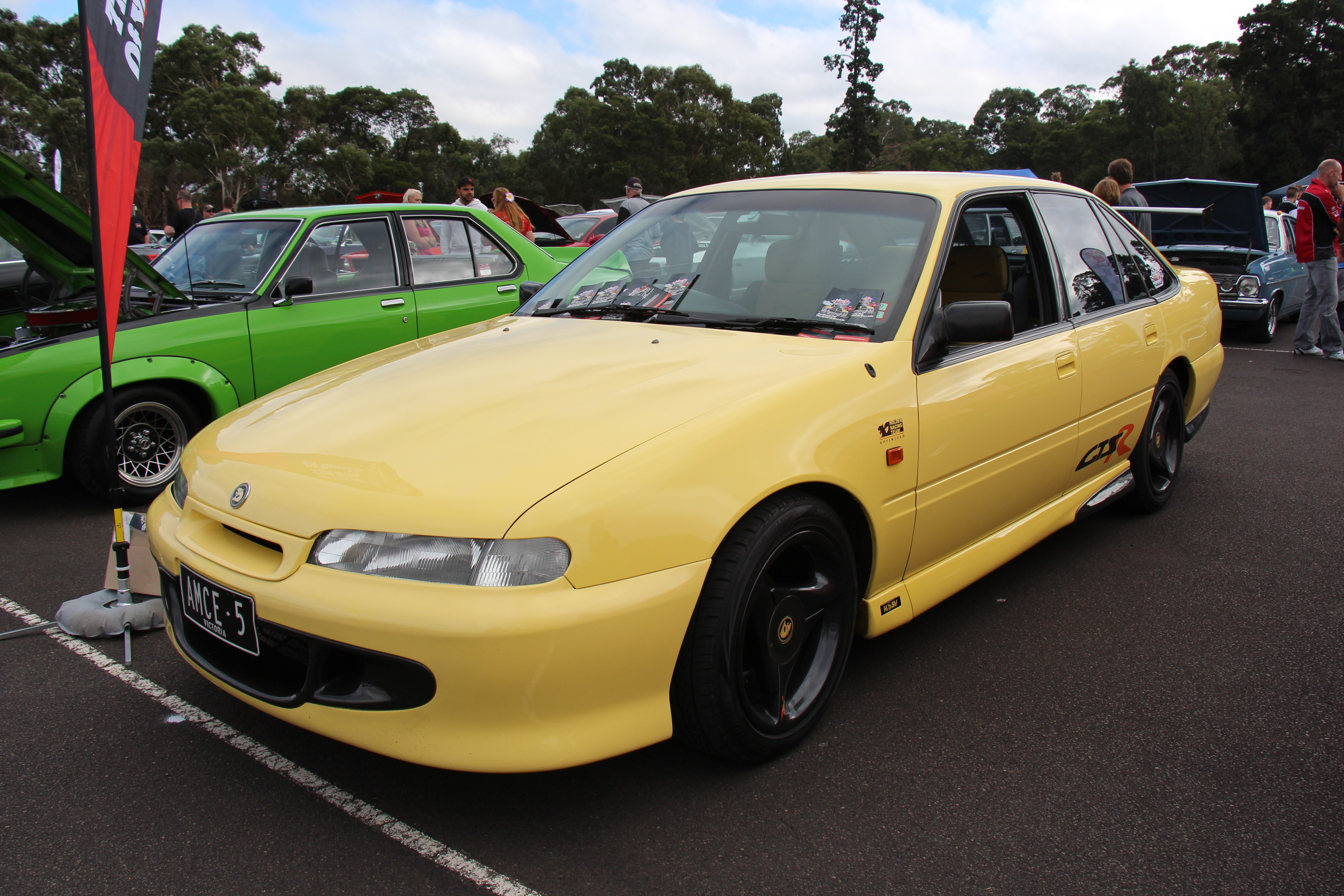
GTS-R (VS)

The VR series was released in 1993. Most of the range was powered by a 5.0-litre V8 producing 185 kW (248 hp), with the GTS and Senator 215i having a 5.7-litre stroked V8 producing 215 kW (288 hp).

The VS series was released in 1995. The Manta was introduced. In 1996 the Grange released, as part of the VS Series II range.

HSV's VR and VS range included:

- ClubSport (wagon available only in the VR Series)
- GTS
- Maloo
- Senator
- Statesman

HSV's VS range added:

- Manta
- Grange (from the VS Series III of 1996)

=== VT ===
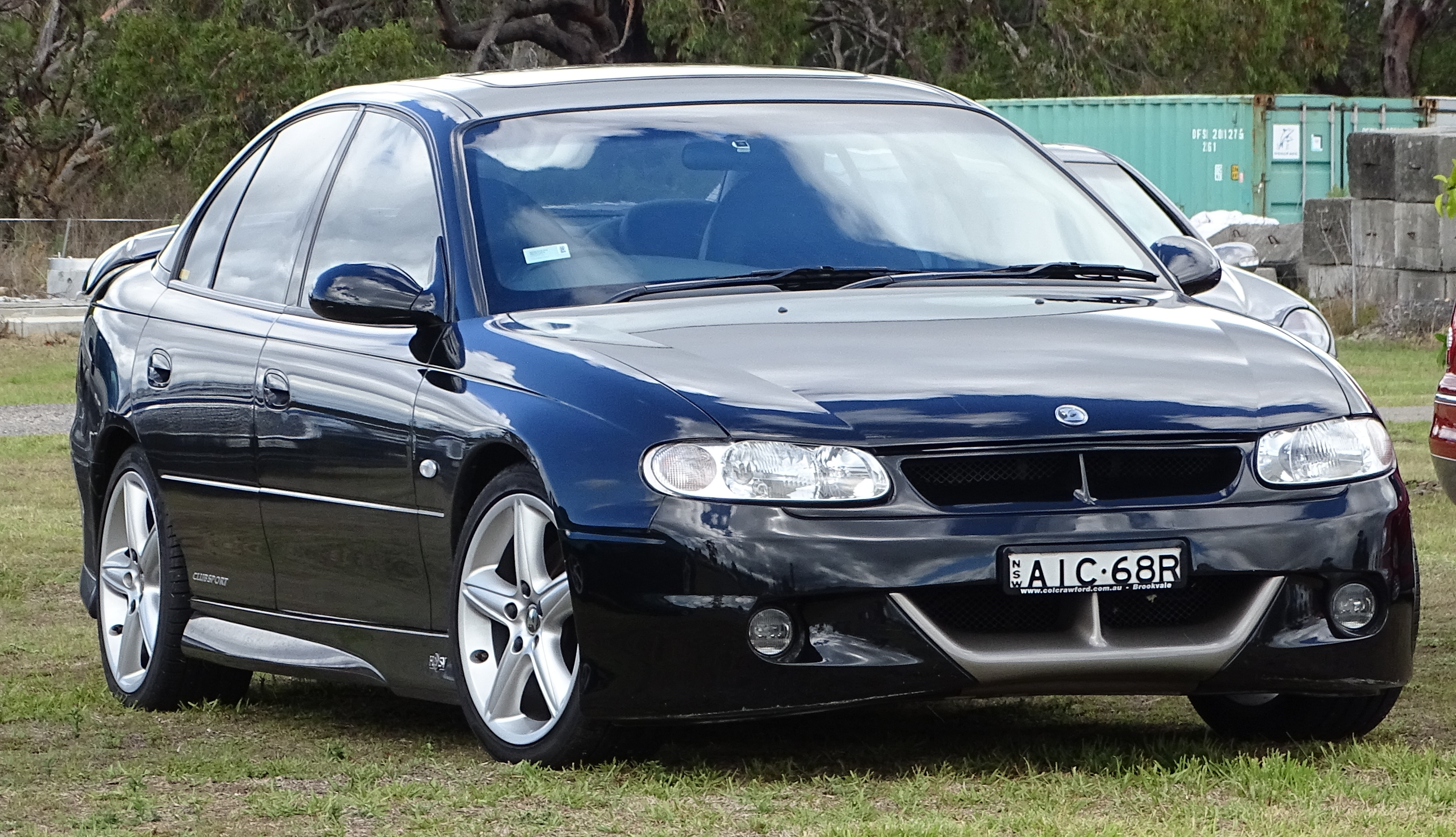
Clubsport R8 (VT II)

The VT range was released in 1997. The Clubsport and Manta were powered 5.0-litre Holden V8 producing 195 kW (261 hp). The GTS was powered by a 5.7-litre V8 producing 220 kW (295 hp). The Senator Signature was powered by a 5.0-litre V8 at 195 kW (261 hp) for the 195i and 220 kW (295 hp) for the 220i. The XU8, which was the last model to carry last-ever Australian-made V8 engine (Holden V8 engine).

The VT Series II released in 1999, most of the range was powered by a 5.7-litre LS1 producing 250 kW (335 hp). The GTS was powered by a LS1 producing 300 kW (402 hp). The Manta was dropped. The XU6 was introduced in 1998, with a supercharged 3.8-litre V6 producing 180 kW (241 hp). The Clubsport R8 was introduced.

The Grange released in 1999, based on the WH Caprice, the 180i was powered by a supercharged L67 3.8 litre V6 producing 180 kW (241 hp) or the 250 with a LS1 V8 producing 250 kW (335 hp). The 180i was dropped in 2000, the Grange's LS1 V8 increased in power in 2000, to 255 kW (342 hp). The WH II Grange released in September 2001.

HSV's VT range included:

- Manta
- ClubSport
- GTS
- Senator Signature
- Senator Signature wagon
- Grange
- Maloo (VS series based utility)
- SV99

The VT Series II range added:

- XU6
- Clubsport R8

=== VX/VU ===
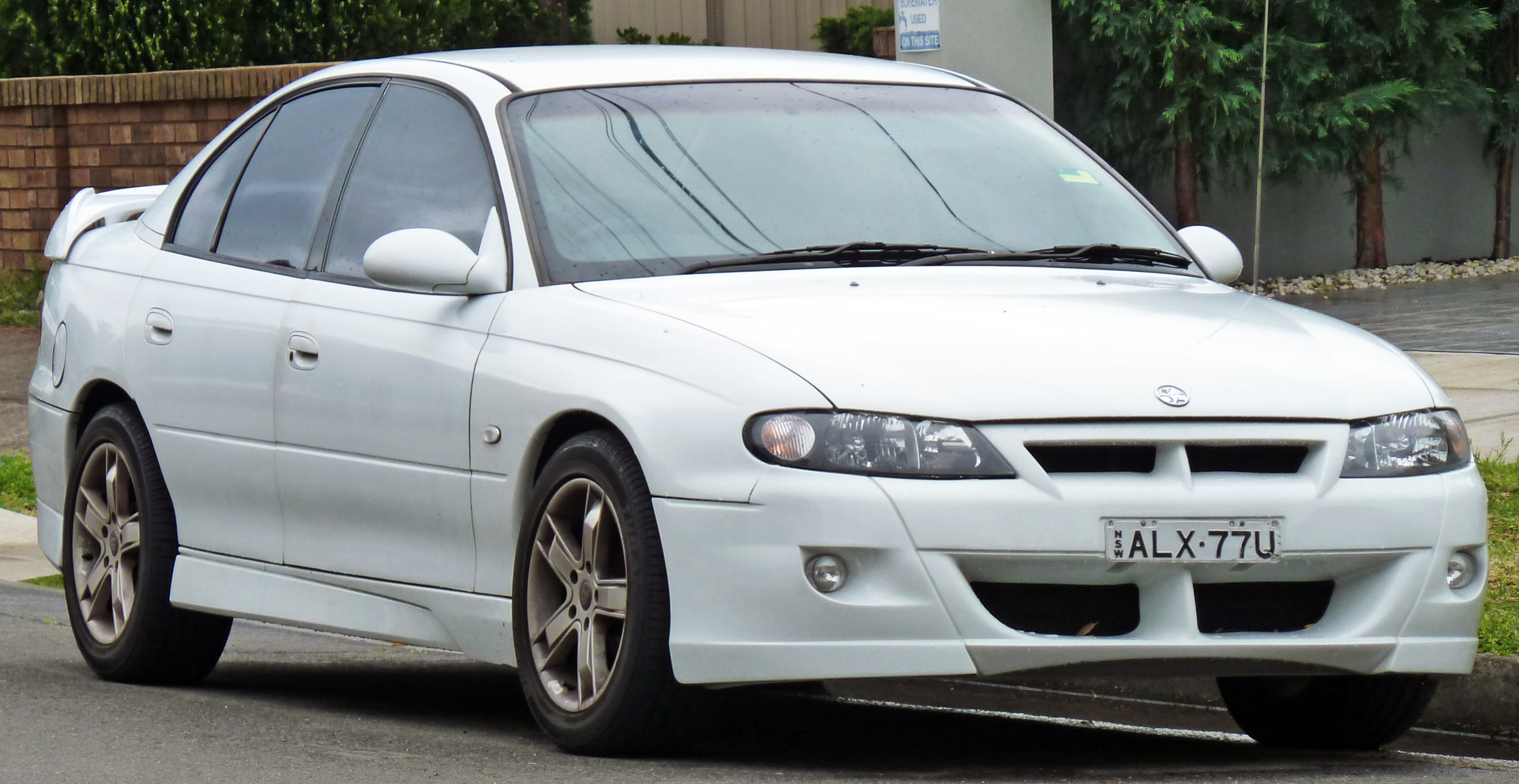
Clubsport (VX)

The HSV VX Series released in 2000. The output of the LS1 was increased to 255 kW (342 hp). The VU Ute saw the release of a new Maloo model, the R8 was added to the Maloo range. The Senator 300 was powered by an LS1 producing 300 kW (402 hp). In late 2001 the Coupé models released, based on the Holden Monaro.

The range included:

- XU6
- ClubSport
- Clubsport R8
- Senator Signature
- Senator 300
- Grange
- GTS
- Maloo

The VX II range added:

- XU6
- SV300
- Coupé GTO
- Coupé GTS
- Maloo R8
- XU6-Maloo

=== Y Series ===
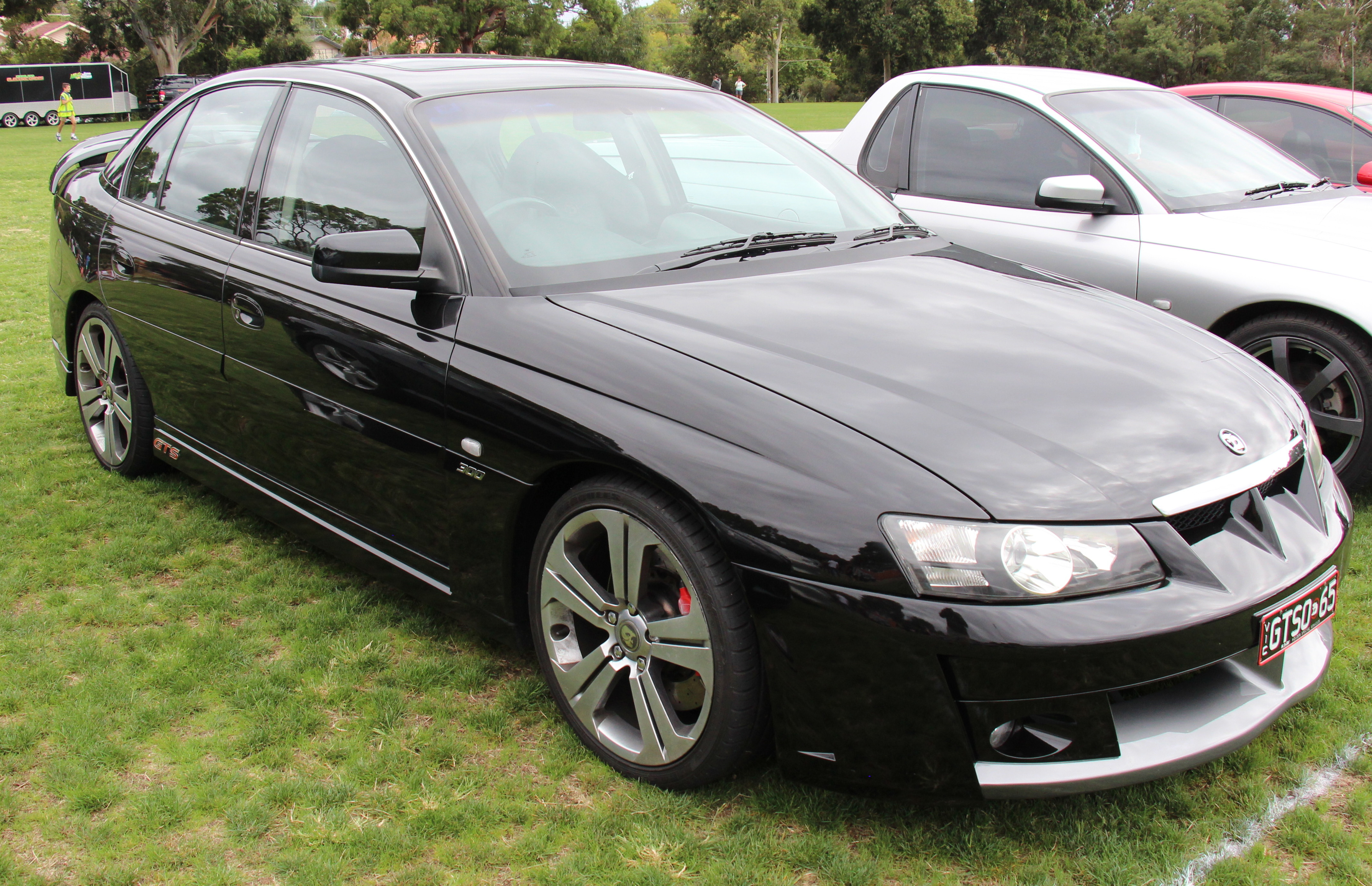
GTS (Y Series)

The Y series released in 2002. Most of the range was powered by a 5.7-litre LS1 producing 260 kW (349 hp), with the GTS and Coupé GTS being powered by an LS1 producing 300 kW (402 hp). The XU6 was dropped.

The Y II Series released in 2003. It increased the power of 5.7-litre LS1 to 285 kW (382 hp). The all-wheel drive Coupé4, Avalanche, and Avalanche XUV were released in 2004.

The range included:

- ClubSport
- Clubsport R8
- GTS
- Senator
- Senator Signature
- Grange
- Coupé GTO
- Coupé GTS
- Maloo
- Maloo R8
- Avalanche

The Y II range added:

- Coupé4
- Avalanche
- Avalanche XUV

=== Z Series ===
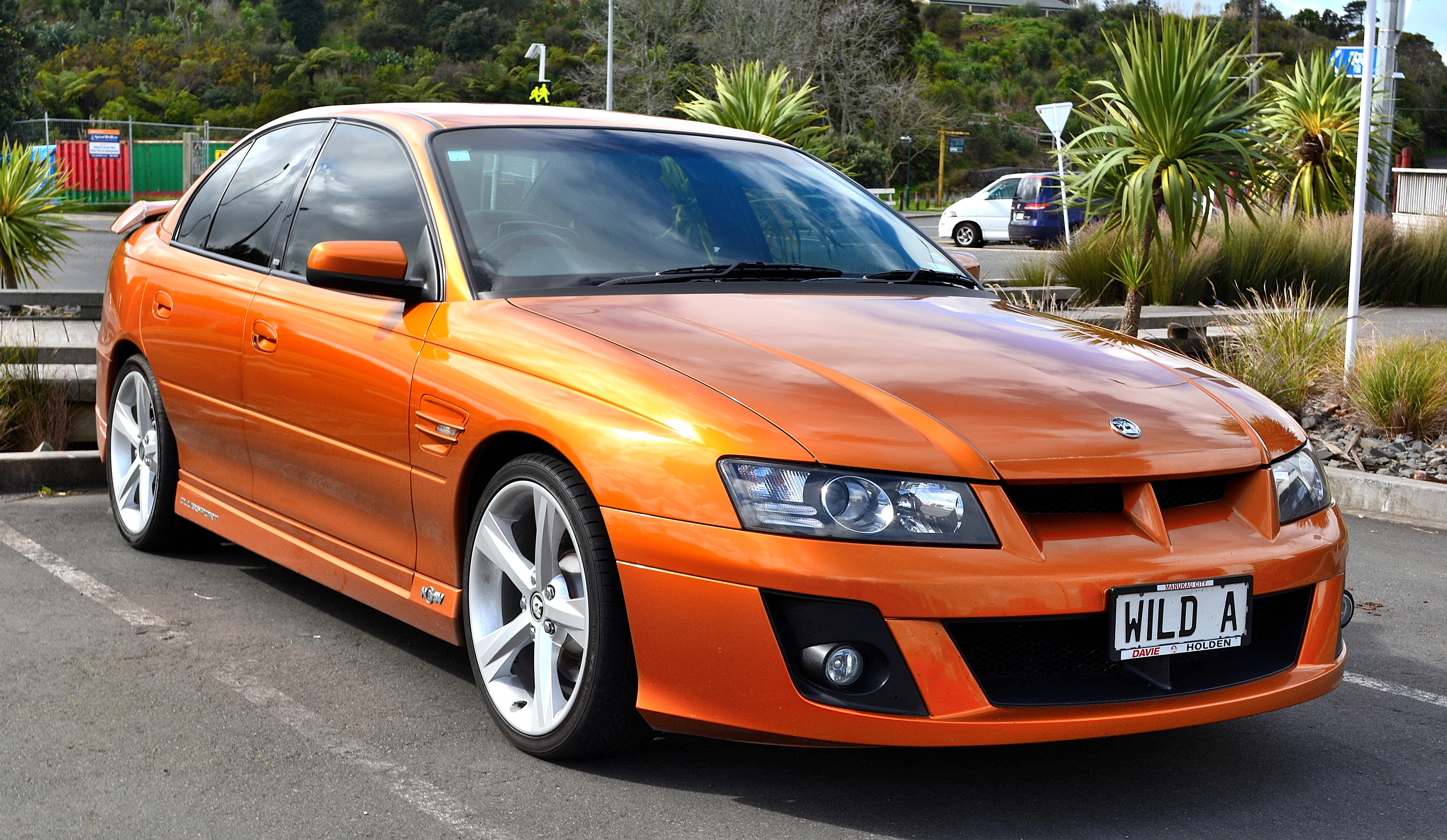
Clubsport (Z Series)

The Z Series was released in October 2004. It introduced the LS2 V8, producing 297 kW (398 hp). The Avalanche, Avalanche XUV and Coupé4 retained the LS1 producing 270 kW (362 hp). There were no GTS and Coupé GTS models. The SV600 was released in 2005.

The range included:

- ClubSport
- Clubsport R8
- SV6000
- Grange
- Senator
- Coupé GTO
- Coupé4
- Maloo
- Maloo R8
- Avalanche
- Avalanche XUV

=== E Series ===
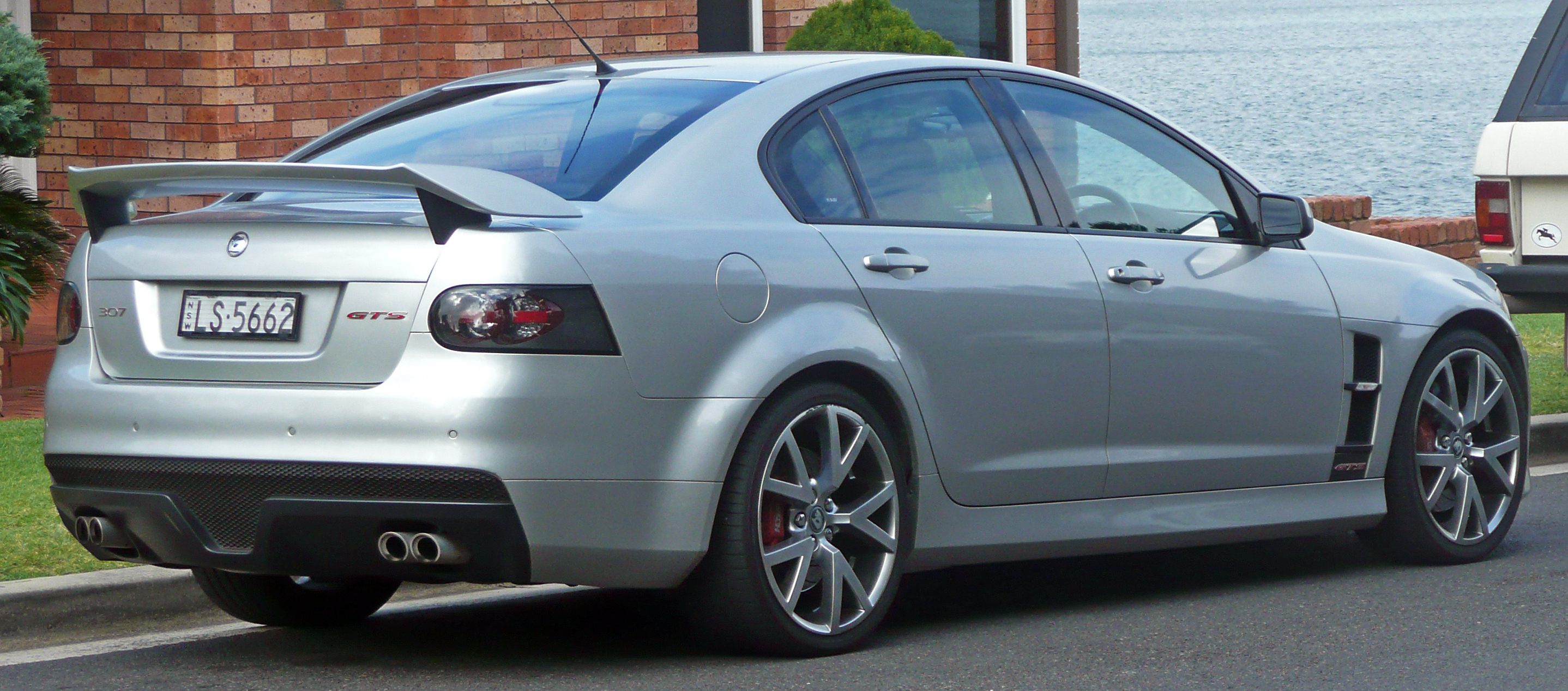
GTS (E Series)

The E Series range was released in August 2006, excluding the Grange which released in October 2006. The Grange It added new LED taillights, side vents and had a LS2 producing 307 kW (412 hp). The GTS, Senator Signature, and Grange had Magnetic Ride Control. In April 2008 HSV switched from the LS2 to the 6.2-litre LS3 engine producing 317 kW (425 hp).

The W427 was released in 2008, it also was shown at the 2008 Melbourne Motor Show. It was powered by a 7.0-litre LS7 producing 375 kW (503 hp). In September 2008 the ClubSport R8 Tourer was released, a wagon based on the Sportswagon.

The E Series 2 was released in September 2009. The range received many cosmetic changes with new front and rear bumpers, twin-nostriled bonnet, and daytime running lights standard across the E2 range. The LS3 in the GTS had its power increased to 325 kW (436 hp). In September 2010, HSV released the E Series 3. It added a bi-fuel option using petrol and LPG using LPI in on all models in the range except the ClubSport R8 Tourer.

The range included:

- Clubsport R8
- Clubsport R8 Tourer
- GTS
- W427
- Senator Signature
- Grange
- Maloo R8

=== Gen-F ===
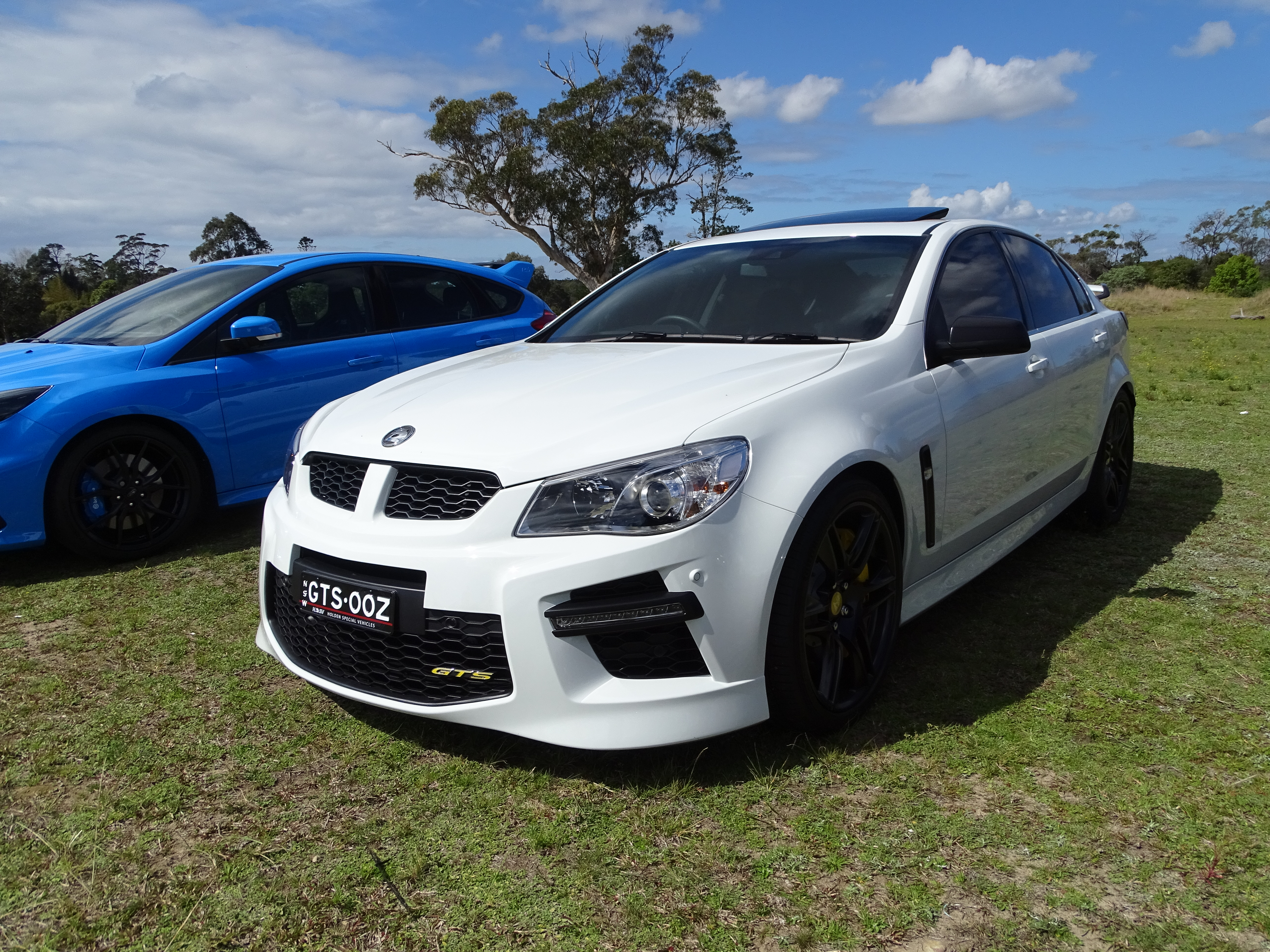
GTS (Gen-F)

The Gen-F series, which is based on the VF Commodore series went on sale in August 2013. The Grange ended production in 2016. The Commodore-based range ended in 2017.

The range included:

- ClubSport
- Clubsport R8
- Clubsport R8 Tourer
- Grange
- GTS
- GTSR
- Maloo
- Maloo R8
- Senator Signature

== Other models ==
HSV made non-Commodore based models since 1988.

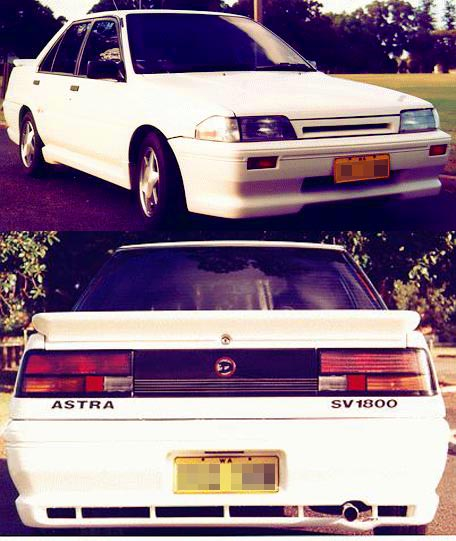
HSV Astra SV1800

=== Astra SV1800 ===
The HSV Astra SV1800 was released in 1988, and was based on the LD-series Holden Astra. It shared the same 1.8-litre GM Family II engine as the standard Astra, producing 79 kW (106 hp) and 151 N⋅m (111 lb⋅ft). It added extractors, sports exhaust, and a body kit. 65 units were produced, both in sedan and hatchback form.

=== VXR Turbo ===
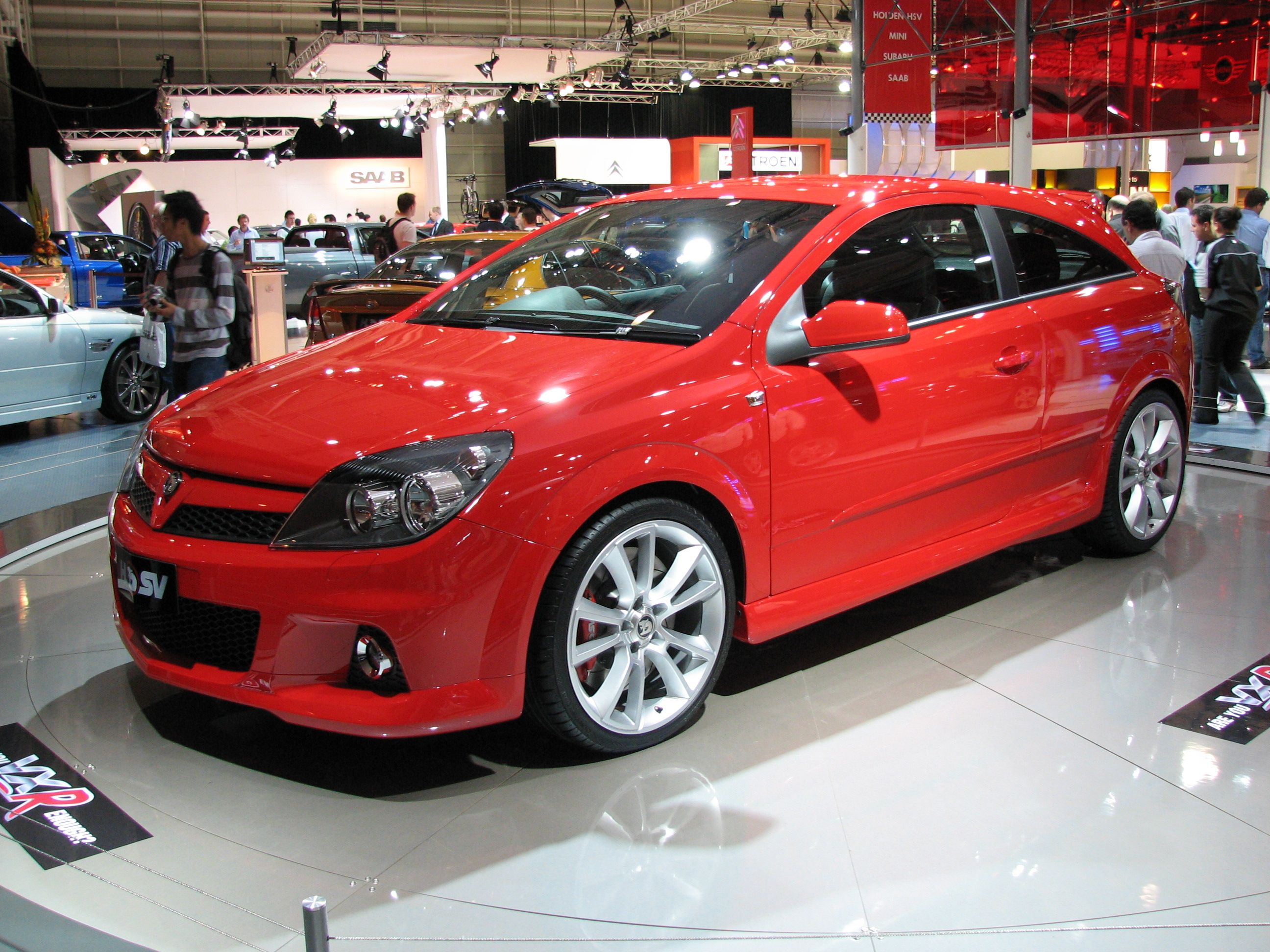
HSV VXR

The HSV VXR Turbo is a rebadged Vauxhall Astra, produced from 2006 to 2009. It has a 2.0-litre turbocharged 4-cylinder engine producing 176 kW (236 hp) and 320 N⋅m (236 lb⋅ft), coupled to a 6-speed manual transmission.

=== HSV Jackaroo ===
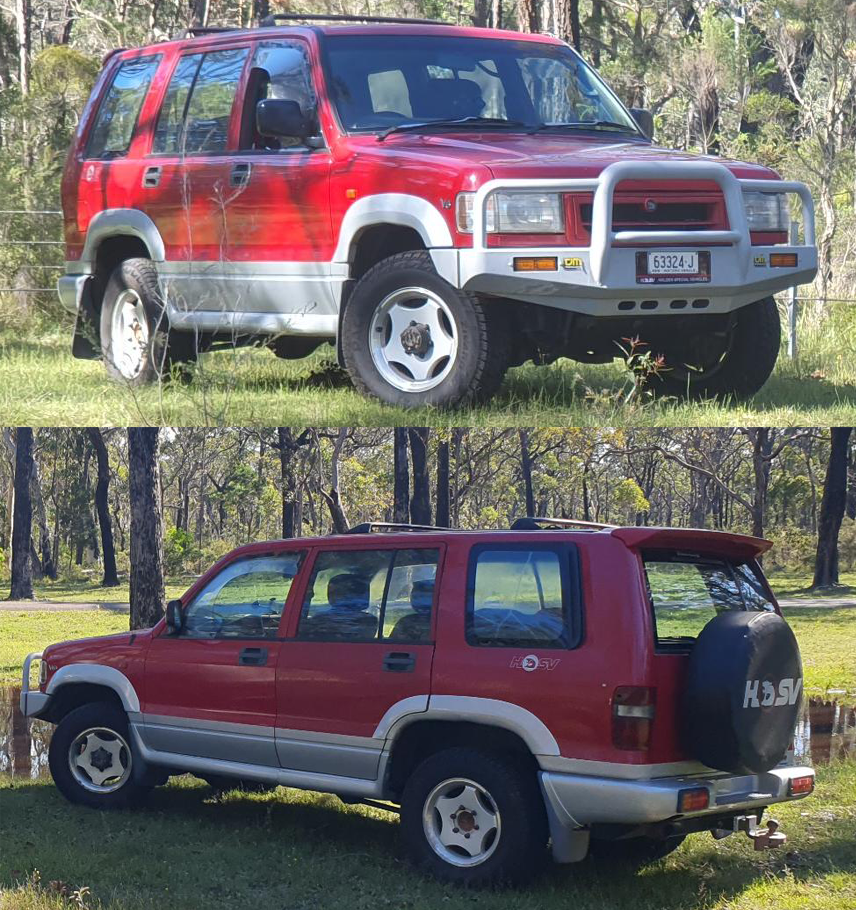
HSV Jackaroo

The HSV Jackaroo was introduced in 1993. It was based on the Holden Jackaroo, itself derived from the second-generation Isuzu Trooper. It was powered by the same 3.2-litre V6 coupled with a four-speed automatic as the Holden Jackaroo, producing 130 kW (174 hp) and 260 N⋅m (192 lb⋅ft). It added air conditioning, new alloy wheels and a limited-slip differential. 79 units were produced.

=== Holden Jackaroo SE ===
The Holden Jackaroo SE was a HSV-modified Jackaroo sold as a Holden.

=== SportsCat ===
The HSV SportsCat was produced from 2018 to 2020, based on the Holden Colorado. It was available in V and SV trims.

=== Colorado V8 ===
Plans for a high power version of the Holden Colorado using the LT1 engine and a 10-speed transmission was cancelled in 2020 with the closure of HSV and Holden. Two prototypes were built with powertrains taken from crash-tested Chevrolet Camaros, one based on a HSV SportsCat, and the other based on a North American Chevrolet Colorado to be aimed at that market. It was the final project worked on by HSV, and would have received a new name, ThunderCat being one of the considered options.

== Production milestones ==
In 2014, HSV reported the following production milestones:

- June 1991: 5,000th HSV built was a SV T-30
- April 1997: 20,000th HSV built was a Senator
- August 2003: 40,000th HSV built was a ClubSport
- July 2006: 50,000th HSV built was a ClubSport
- February 2013: 75,000th HSV built was a ClubSport
- September 2014: 80,000th HSV built was a ClubSport R8 in Phantom Black paint
- December 2017: 90,000th HSV built

== Exports ==
HSV exported its range to New Zealand and Singapore without any rebranding, in the case of Singapore exports started in 2010. HSV was rebadged elsewhere, starting in 2006 in the United Kingdom (with the Vauxhall Monaro VXR), and 2008 in the Middle East with the CSV CR8.

=== Vauxhall ===
- Monaro VXR. based on the in Y Series II and Z Series HSV GTO Coupe
- VXR8, based on the E-Series ClubSport R8
- VXR8 GTS, based on the E-Series and Gen-F GTS

=== Chevrolet Special Vehicles (CSV) ===
HSV first reached into the Middle Eastern market with a one-race series featuring stripped down ClubSport R (Z Series) sedans in Dubai and Bahrain, the Chevrolet Supercars Middle East Championship.

- CR8, based on the E-Series ClubSport

== Concept cars ==
VN Convertible

The VN Convertible was based on the VN Berlina, built in 1989. It was converted from a sedan to convertible by Maverick Motors. The wheelbase was shortened, the front doors were lengthened, added independent rear suspension and a GM TH400 automatic gearbox and 5.0-litre V8.

HRT Maloo

The HRT Maloo concept had a 6.2-litre LS6 engine producing 350 kW (469 hp) tuned by Callaway Cars, adding a wider bodykit and 20-inch wheels.

Maloo Cab Chassis

The Maloo Cab Chassis concept was powered by a LS1 producing 260 kW (349 hp), it was a cab chassis model based on the Holden One Tonner. It was shown at the 2003 Melbourne Motor Show.

HRT 427

The HRT 427 concept was based on a modified Holden Monaro bodyshell and, among other things, it featured a 427 cubic inches (7,000 cm^{3}) V8 engine based on the LS6 V8, but with capacity taken from 5.7 L (5,665 cc) to 7.0 L (7,000 cc) – hence the name. Due to the high cost specifications, the business case for full production failed since Holden could not build the 427 in such limited quantities for the original asking price of A$215,000. Only two road and three racing versions were ever built.

The project was done at the same time that the Holden Monaro 427C GT racing car that raced in (and won) the 2002 Bathurst 24 Hour (repeating victory in 2003) and then raced in the Australian Nations Cup Championship. Effectively, the HRT 427 was supposed to be the road car variant to the racing 427C Monaro's.

GTS-R

This concept was unveiled at the 2004 Sydney Motor Show also based on the Monaro bodyshell. Similarities could be drawn with the HRT 427, however, this model was only intended for a one-make racing series and was powered by a modified 6.0-litre version of Chevrolet's LS2 V8 engine producing 335 kW (455 PS; 449 hp). This concept, too, never reached production.

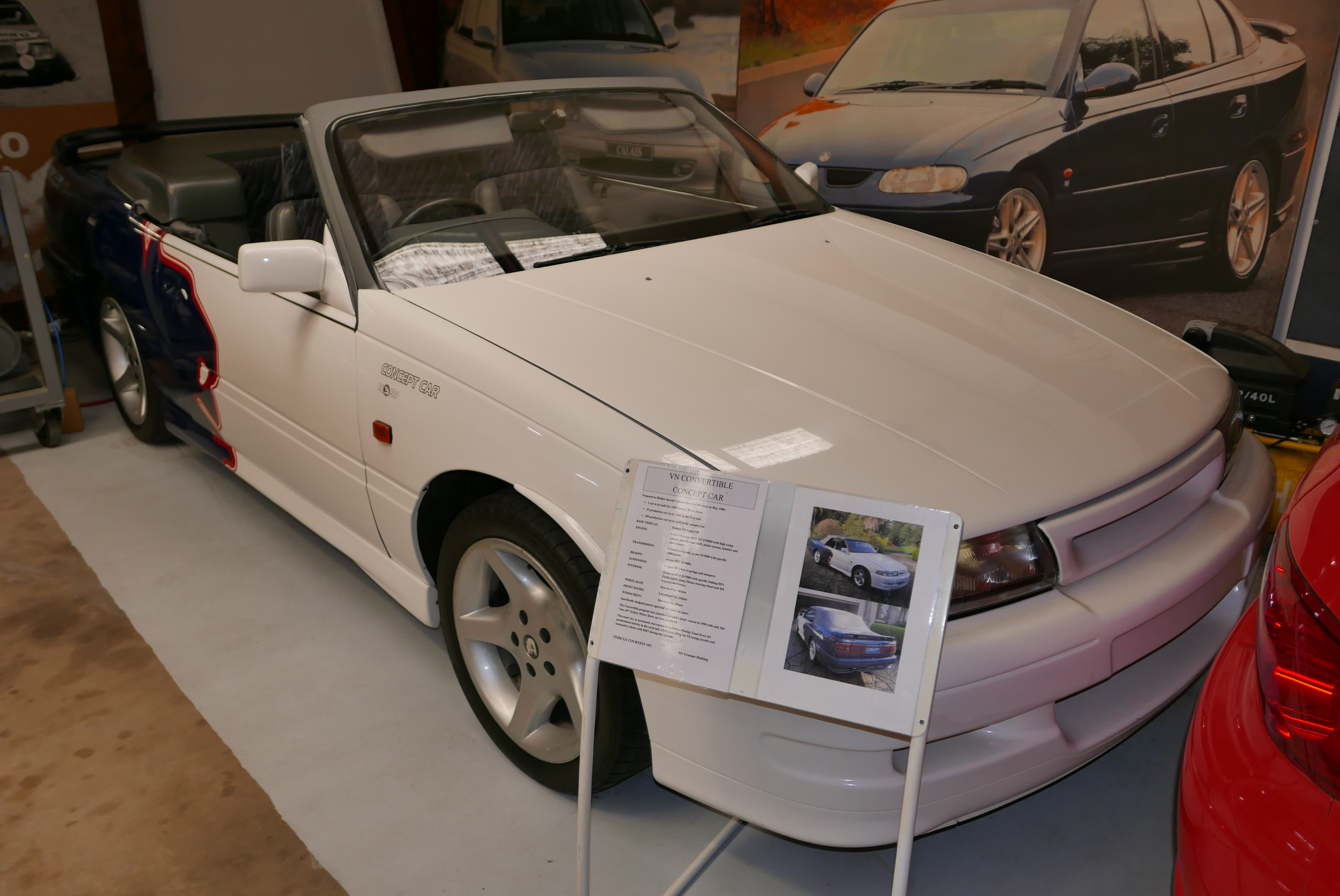
VN Convertible

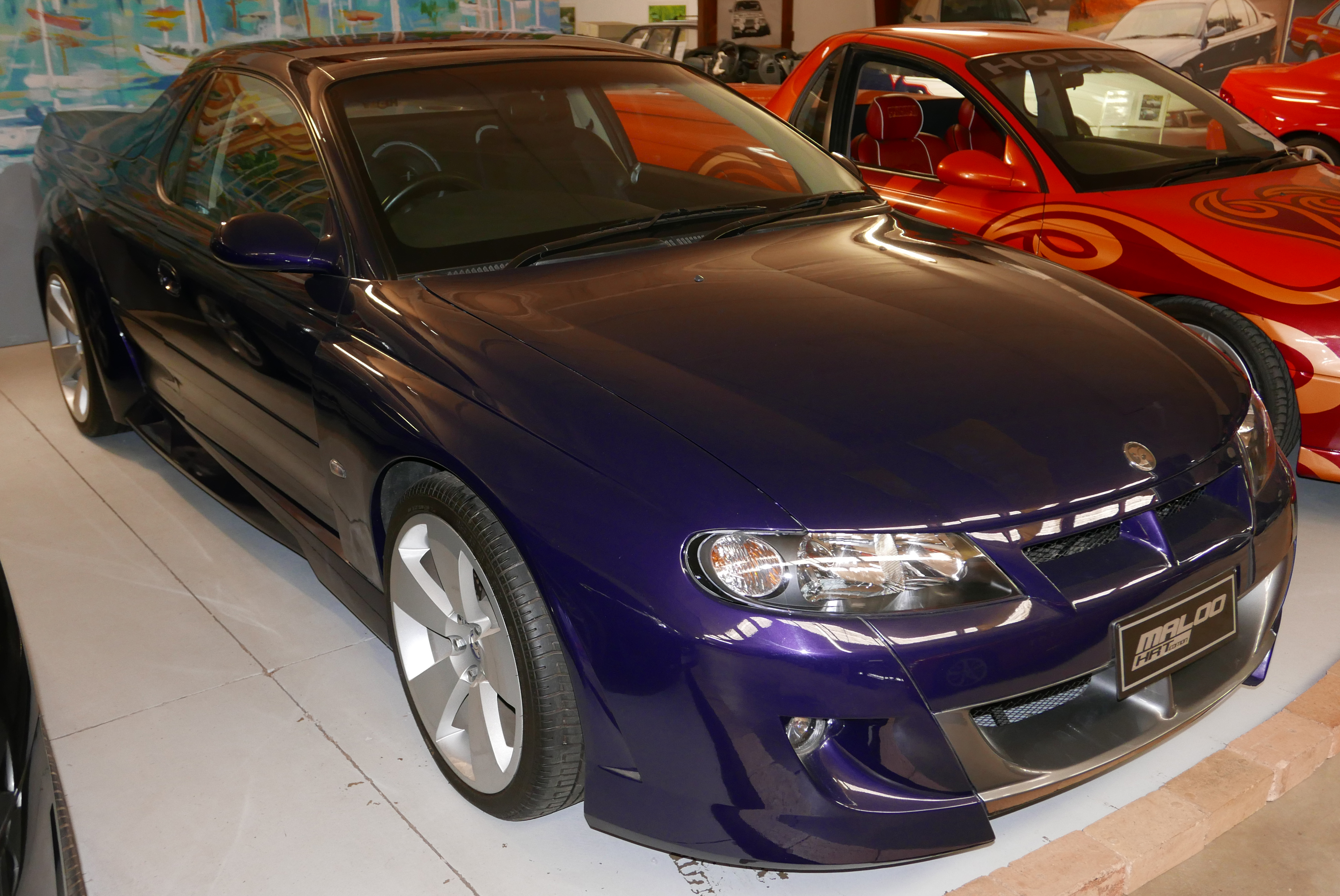
HRT Maloo

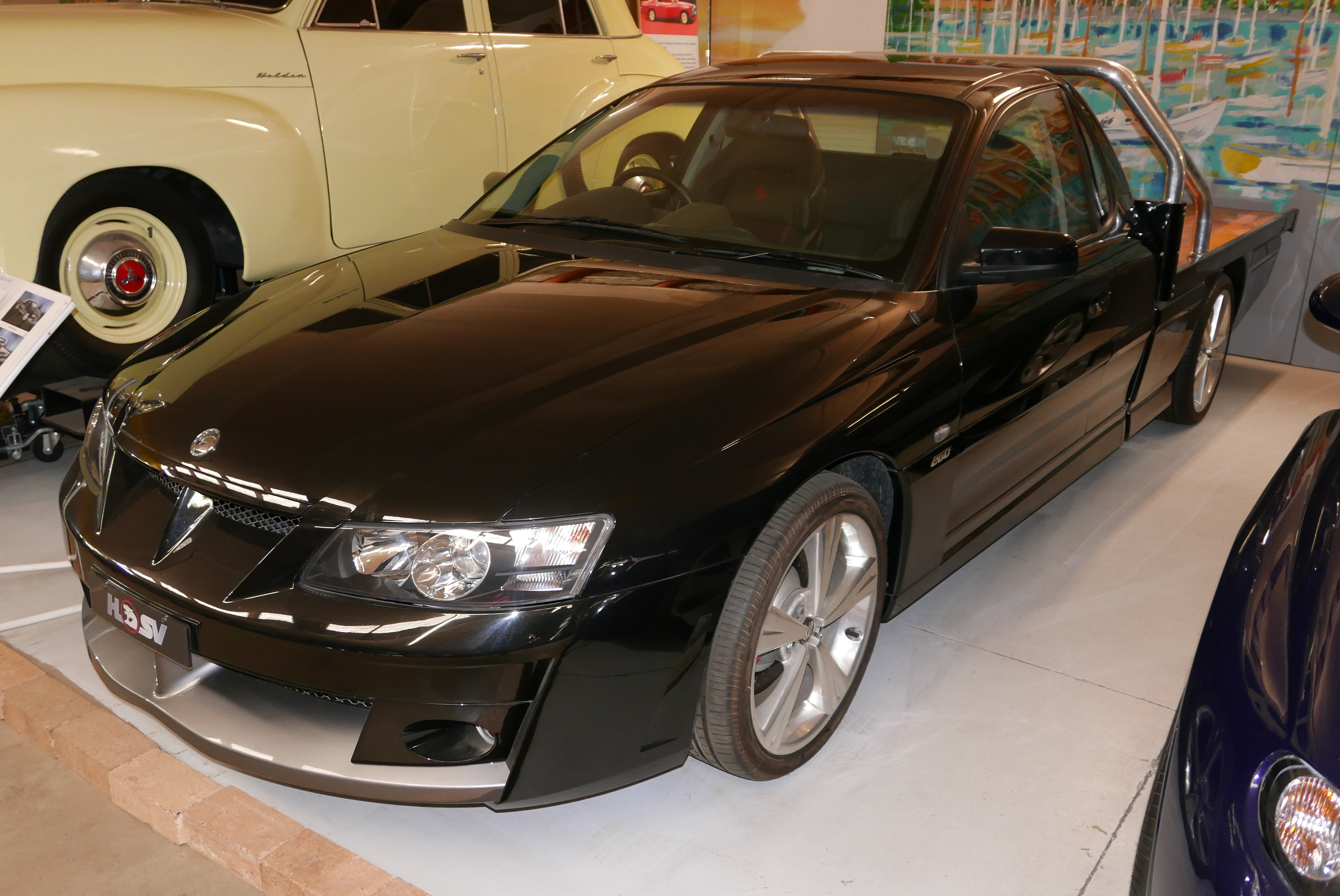
Maloo cab chassis

== V8 Supercars ==
In 2005, HSV provided sponsorship for the V8 Supercar team then-called the Kmart Dealer Team. The team adopted HSV Dealer Team as their new name. Holden opposed the idea, fearing that it would undermine Holden Racing Team's link with HSV.

== Rivals ==
HSV's direct rival was Ford Australia through its various performance arms, namely Ford Tickford Experience (FTE) from 1999, and Ford Performance Vehicles (FPV) from 2002 to 2014, with their production of modified Ford Falcon-based cars. Another rival, albeit on a smaller scale, has been Corsa Specialised Vehicles (CSV) with its Commodore-based high performance cars that included the CSV GTS of 2007. CSV beat the HSV W427 to the market by being the first Holden vehicle powered by a 7.0L LS7 V8 engine.

== See also ==
- List of HSV vehicles
