= FPV GS =

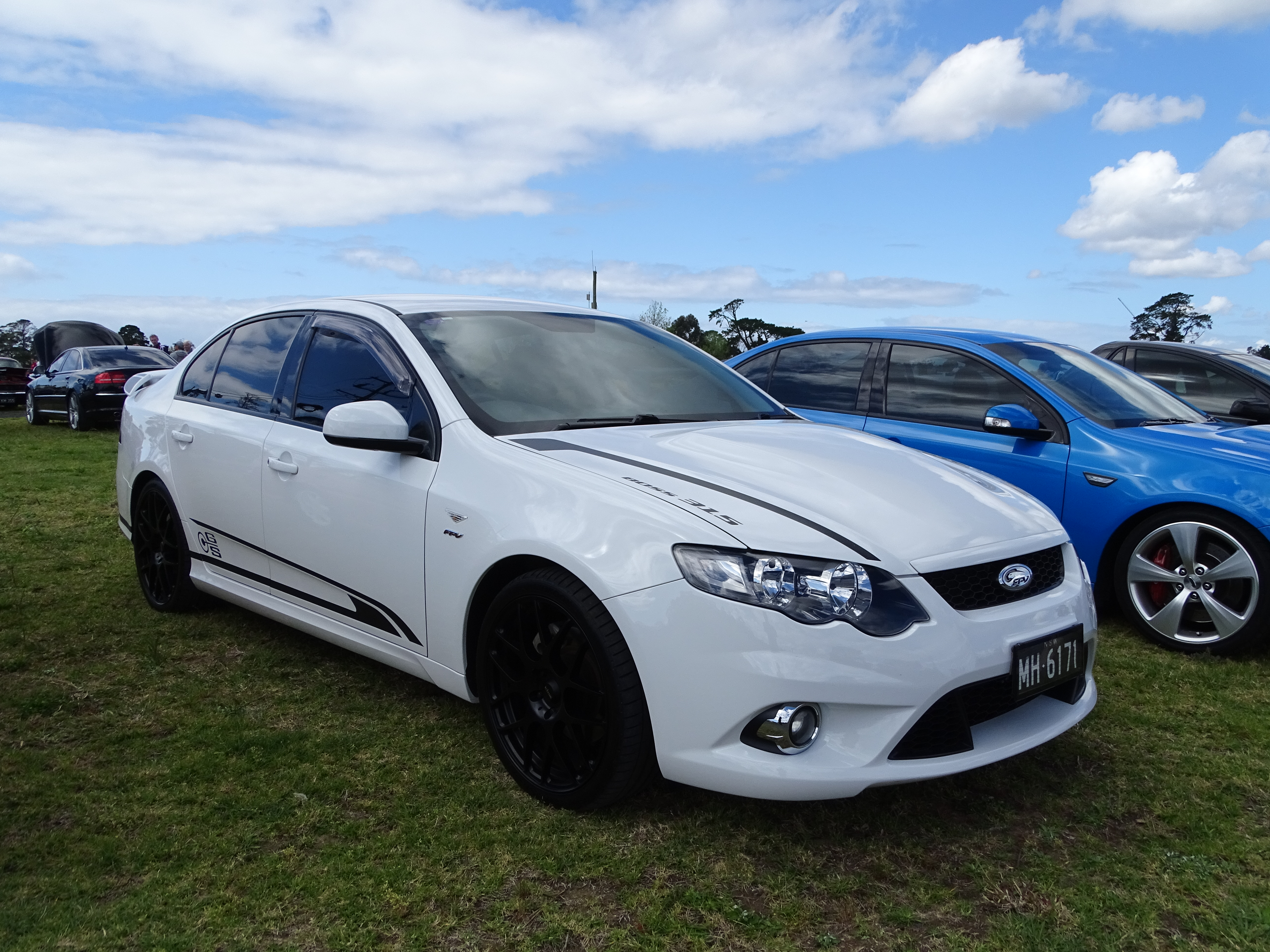
- FPV GS sedan

Overview
- Manufacturer: Ford Performance Vehicles
- Production: 2009–2014

Body and chassis
- Class: Full-size car
- Body style: 4-door sedan 2-door coupé utility
- Related: Ford Falcon; FPV F6; FPV GT; FPV Pursuit

Powertrain
- Engine: 5.4 L Boss 302 V8; 5.0 L Miami supercharged V8

The FPV GS is a full-size sedan and coupé utility produced by Ford Performance Vehicles from 2009 until 2014.

== Overview ==
The FPV GS was released in 2009, powered by a Boss V8 producing 302 kW (405 hp) and 551 N⋅m (406 lb⋅ft) of torque.

In 2010 the supercharged Miami V8 replaced the Boss engine, in the GS range it produced 315 kW (422 hp) at 5750 rpm and 545 N⋅m (402 lb⋅ft) of torque at 2000-5500 rpm.
