= Ford Performance Vehicles =

Vehicle make

- Type: Private
- Industry: Automotive
- Predecessor: Ford SVO Australia; Ford Tickford Experience
- Founded: 2002
- Defunct: 2014; 12 years ago
- Fate: Management buyout, becomes Premcar
- Successor: Ford Performance Australia
- Headquarters: Campbellfield, Melbourne, Victoria, Australia
- Area served: Australia and New Zealand
- Products: Automobiles
- Parent: Ford Australia

Ford Performance Vehicles (FPV) was the performance arm for Ford Australia. It was a Melbourne-based joint venture between Prodrive and Ford Australia. The company produced a range of Ford-based models from 2002 to 2014 under the FPV marque.

== History ==
Ford Australia first partnered with the English automotive engineering company Tickford in 1991, with the joint venture Tickford Vehicle Engineering. In 2002, following Prodrive's purchase of Tickford, Ford Performance Vehicles was formed as a joint venture between Ford Australia and Prodrive.

In 2003, the FPV GT, GT-P and Pursuit released with the 5.4-litre Boss 290 V8 engine at 290 kW (389 hp) The GT being based on the BA Falcon, while the GT-P was based on the BA Fairmont. The Pursuit was based on the BA Falcon coupe utility

In October 2004, FPV released BA mkII-based models, introducing the Super Pursuit as a luxury coupe utility, powered by the Boss 290, and the FPV F6 Typhoon and Tornado, powered by the turbocharged 4.0-litre straight-six Barra 270T engine at 270 kW (362 hp).

The BF Falcon-based FPV models released in 2005, the power Boss 290 for the GT and Barra 270T engine for the F6 were unchanged. In October 2006, the BF MkII series the luxury Force 6 and Force 8 were introduced, based on the F6 and GT, retaining the same engines respectively, the leather interiors were optionally in red or black upholstery, with the models competing with the HSV Senator.

In 2008, FPV introduced the Ford Territory-based FPV F6X. The F6X included a Turbocharged Ford Barra engine at 270 kW (362 hp), the F6X was discontinued in 2009.

The FG Falcon-based FPV models released in 2008, with the Force 6 and 8 were replaced by the F6-E and GT-E respectively. The F6 was powered by a turbocharged Barra at 310 kW (416 hp). The GT was powered by a Boss 290 at 315 kW (422 hp). In 2009 the GS model was introduced with a Boss 302 at 302 kW (405 hp), as a sedan and ute. A GT 5th anniversary edition was produced in 2009.

In 2010 the Boss V8 was replaced by the supercharged 5.0-litre Miami V8, available in the GS at 315 kW (422 hp) and the GT at 335 kW (449 hp). A GT Black edition was produced in 2011. The Pursuit was dropped in 2010.

The power of the FG MkII-based FPV models remained unchanged for the December 2011. In 2012 the Pursuit model was brought back as a limited-edition model.

The purchase from Prodrive also saw a factory backed V8 Supercar outfit in Ford Performance Racing.

In August 2012, Ford Australia announced its purchase of FPV assets to continue the engineering, manufacturing and marketing of that performance brand in Australia. In preparation for Ford Australia's manufacturing shutdown, the FPV brand and its range were discontinued in 2014, after 12 years of production and marketing.

=== Nameplates ===
F6
The FPV F6 is a full-size sedan and coupé utility, offered from 2004 to 2014, based on the XR6 Turbo. In the BA and BF series the "Typhoon" and "Tornado" monikers were used for the sedan and Ute respectively. An executive variant 'F6E' was launched in 2009.

F6X
The FPV F6X is a crossover SUV offered from 2008 to 2009.

Force 6 / Force 8
The Force 6 is a luxury-oriented variant based on the F6, the Force 8 is a variant sedan based on the GT. Offered from 2006 to 2007.

GS
The FPV GS is a full-size sedan and Ute, offered from 2011 to 2014, based on the GT. It was the entry-level offering from its introduction.

GT
The FPV GT is a full-size sedan, offered from 2003 to 2014, based on the XR8. The luxury and performance variants, the GT-E and GT-P were launched alongside the GT. It was the entry-level offering before the release of the GS in 2011.
Pursuit
The FPV Pursuit is a Ute, offered from 2003 to 2014, based on the GT. A Super Pursuit variant based on the GT was launched in 2004, based on the GT-P.

== Model Series ==
=== BA ===
The 2002 BA range included the GT, GT-P, and the Pursuit. The GT was the entry-level vehicle that started with a suggested retail price of A$59,810. The GT-P was the upmarket version of the GT, with a price tag of A$69,850. The Pursuit was a ute (utility) version of the GT, featuring the same seats, basic dash/interior package and wheels. A FPV specific body-kit was applied to all cars, using the lights from the XR-range. The kit had a strong resemblance to the BA Falcon V8 Supercar, highlighting the connection to FPR.

All three were powered by a unique version of Ford's 5.4-litre Modular V8, with DOHC 4-valve cylinder heads from the Mustang Cobra R engine. FPV named this uniquely tuned engine as the Boss 290 because of its power output. It produced 290 kW (394 PS; 389 bhp) at 5,500 rpm and 520 N⋅m (380 lb⋅ft) of torque at 4,500 rpm.

Featured Models

- GT
- GT-P
- Pursuit
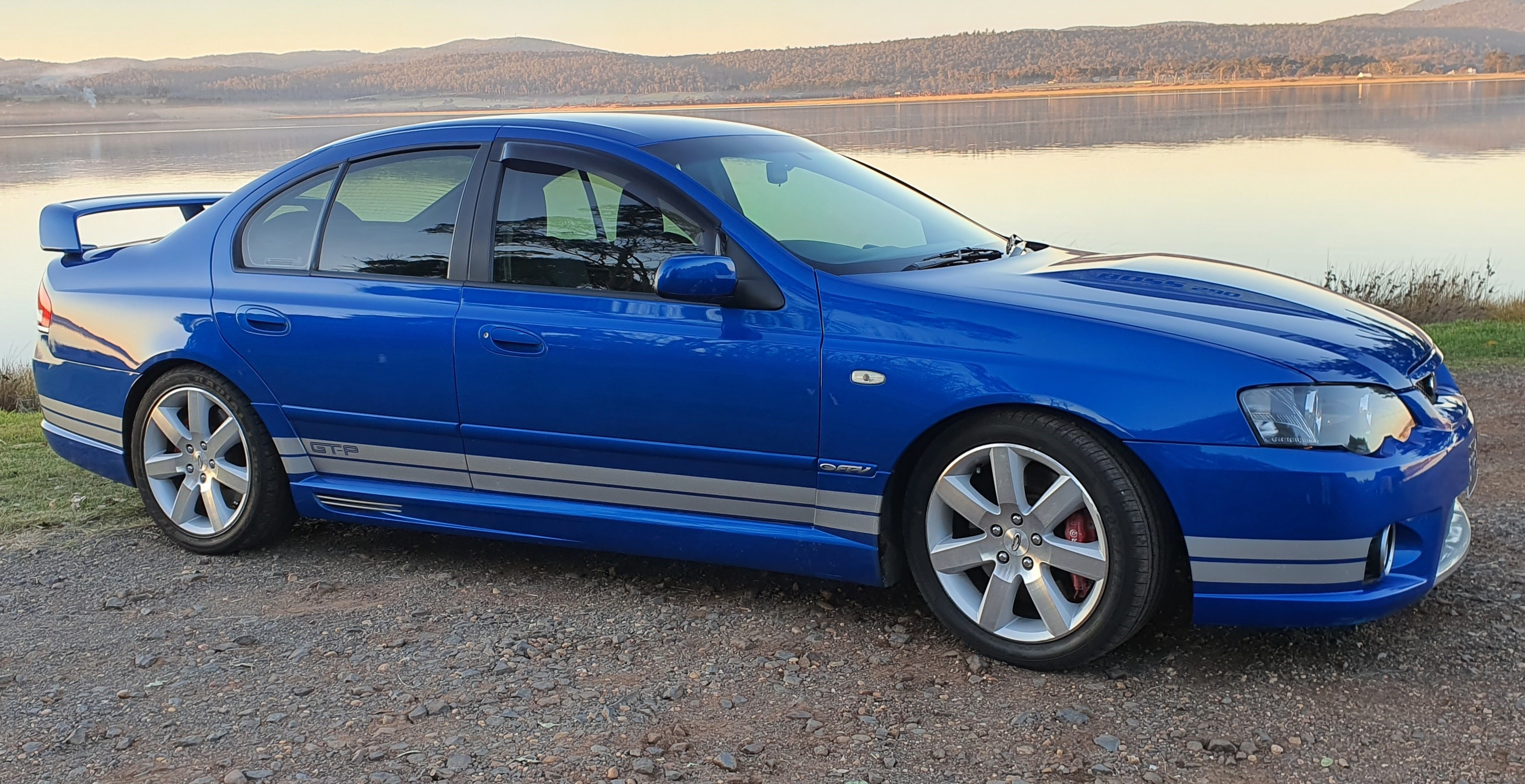
FPV BA GT-P MkI (Built Aug 04)

==== MkII update ====
The GT, GT-P and Pursuit received a new stripe package with bonnet decals, a six-speed Tremec T56 manual and the GT-P received 19" five-spoke alloy wheels. FPV also released the Super Pursuit, which was a Pursuit ute with GT-P extras.

New six cylinder sedan and utility models were added to the range, the F6 Typhoon (sedan) and F6 Tornado (Utility). The F6 was visually separated from the GT range with the use of a different pattern in the front bumper grille mesh, and a smaller boot spoiler on the sedan. F6 models were powered by FPV's version of the Ford Barra engine, a 4.0 litre DOHC 24-valve turbocharged inline-six with variable cam timing producing 270 kW (367 PS; 362 bhp) at 5,250 rpm and 550 N⋅m (410 lb⋅ft) at 2,000 - 4,250 rpm.

Featured Models

- F6 Tornado
- F6 Typhoon
- GT
- GT-P
- Pursuit
- Super Pursuit
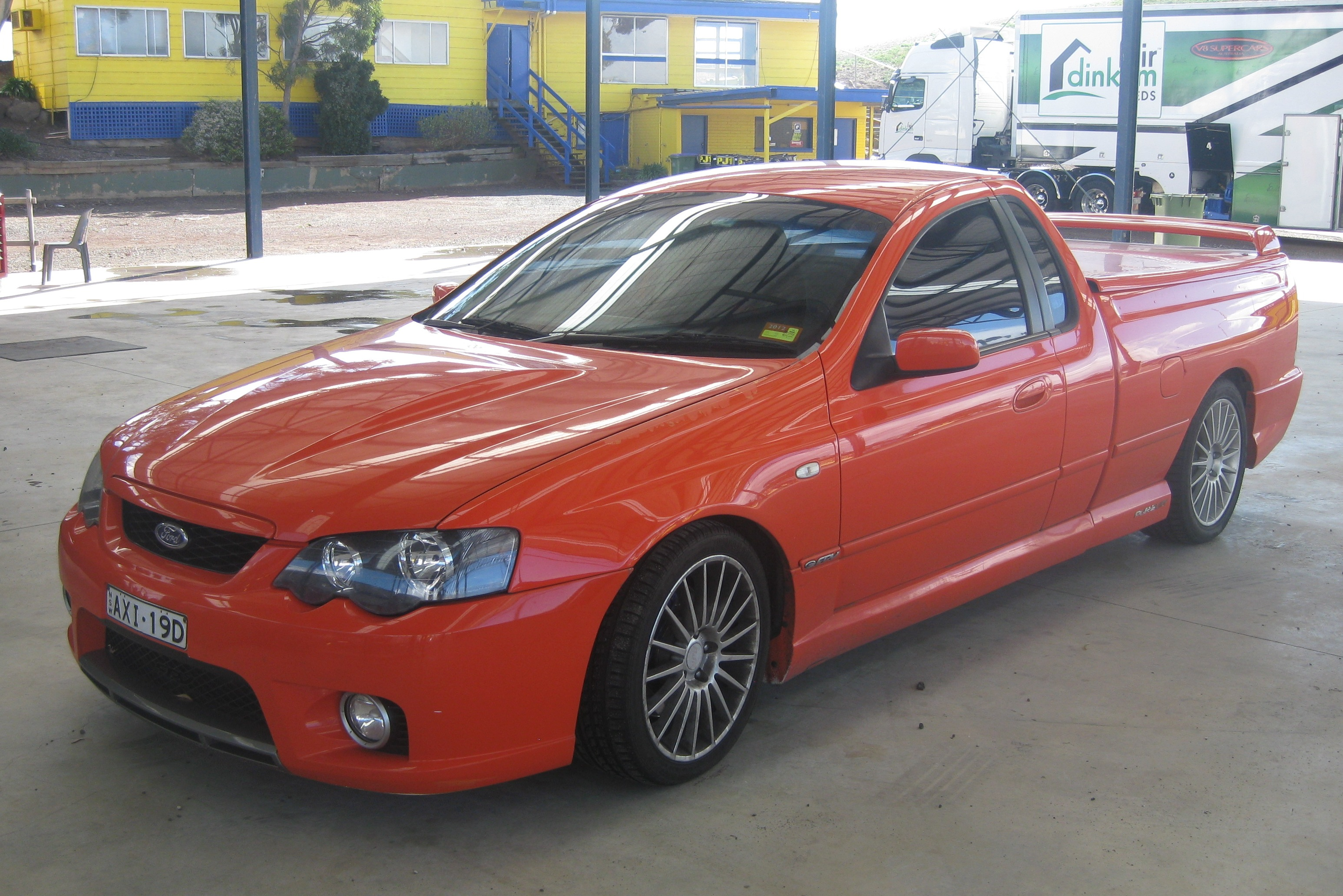
FPV BA Pursuit

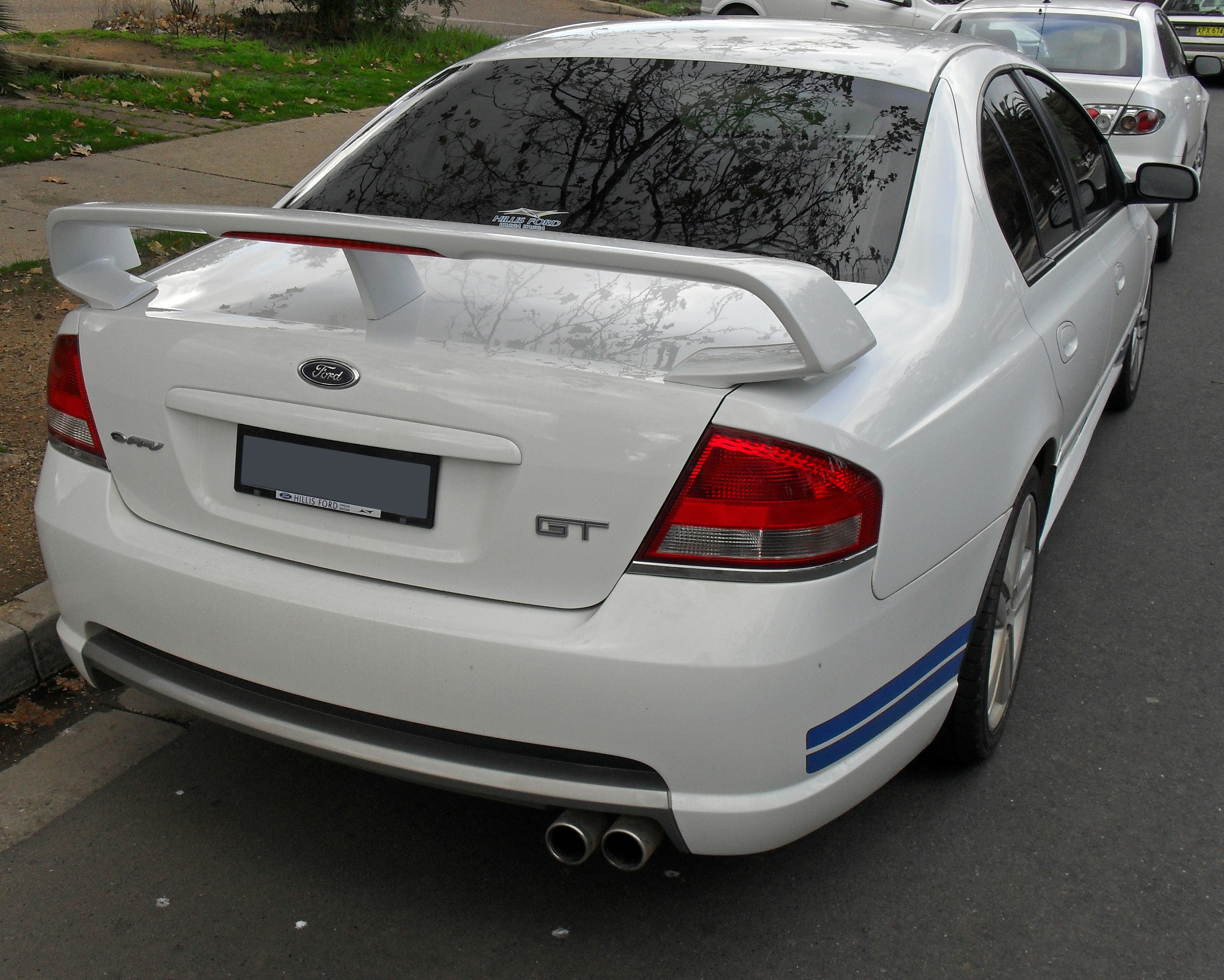
FPV BA GT

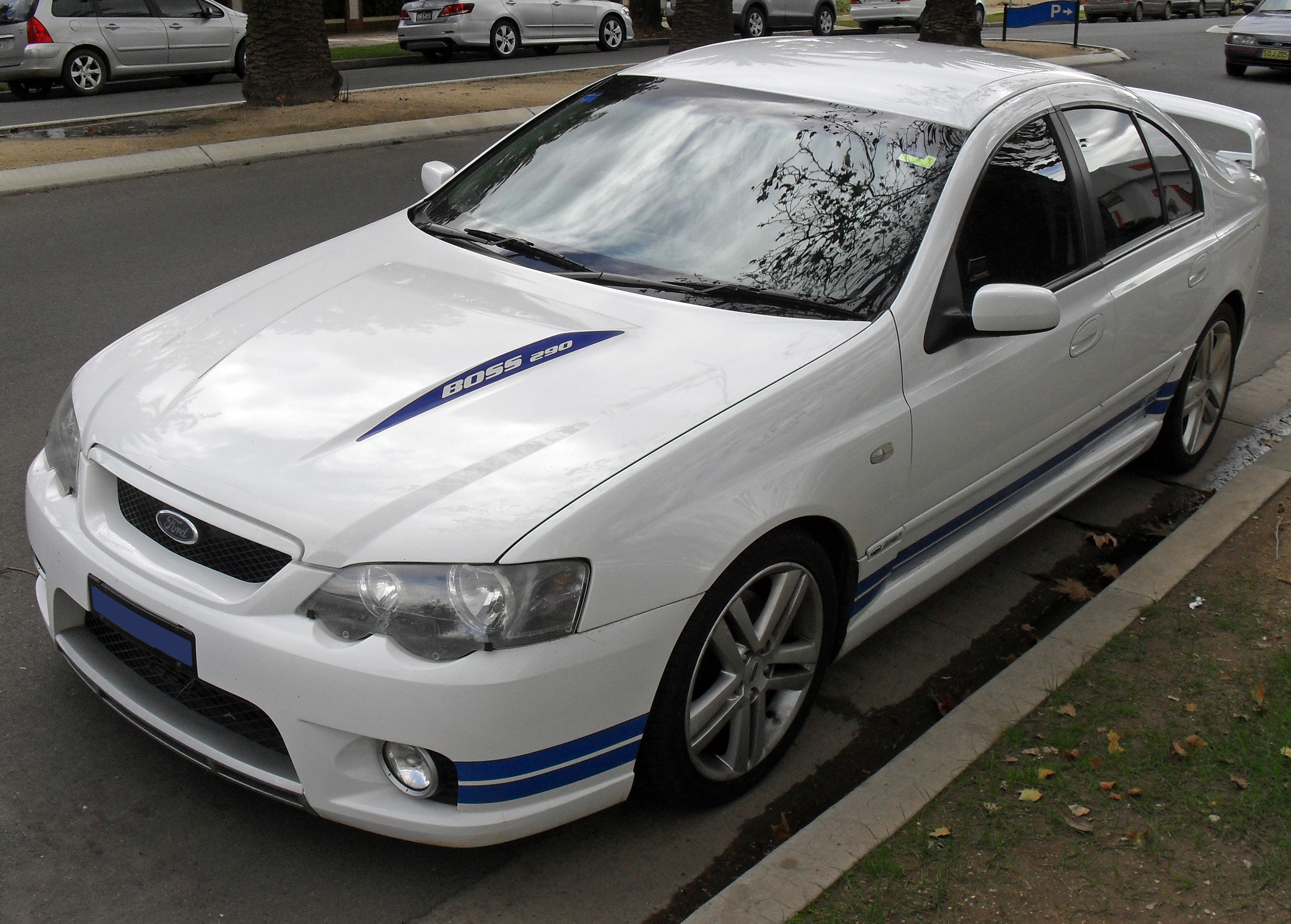
FPV BA GT

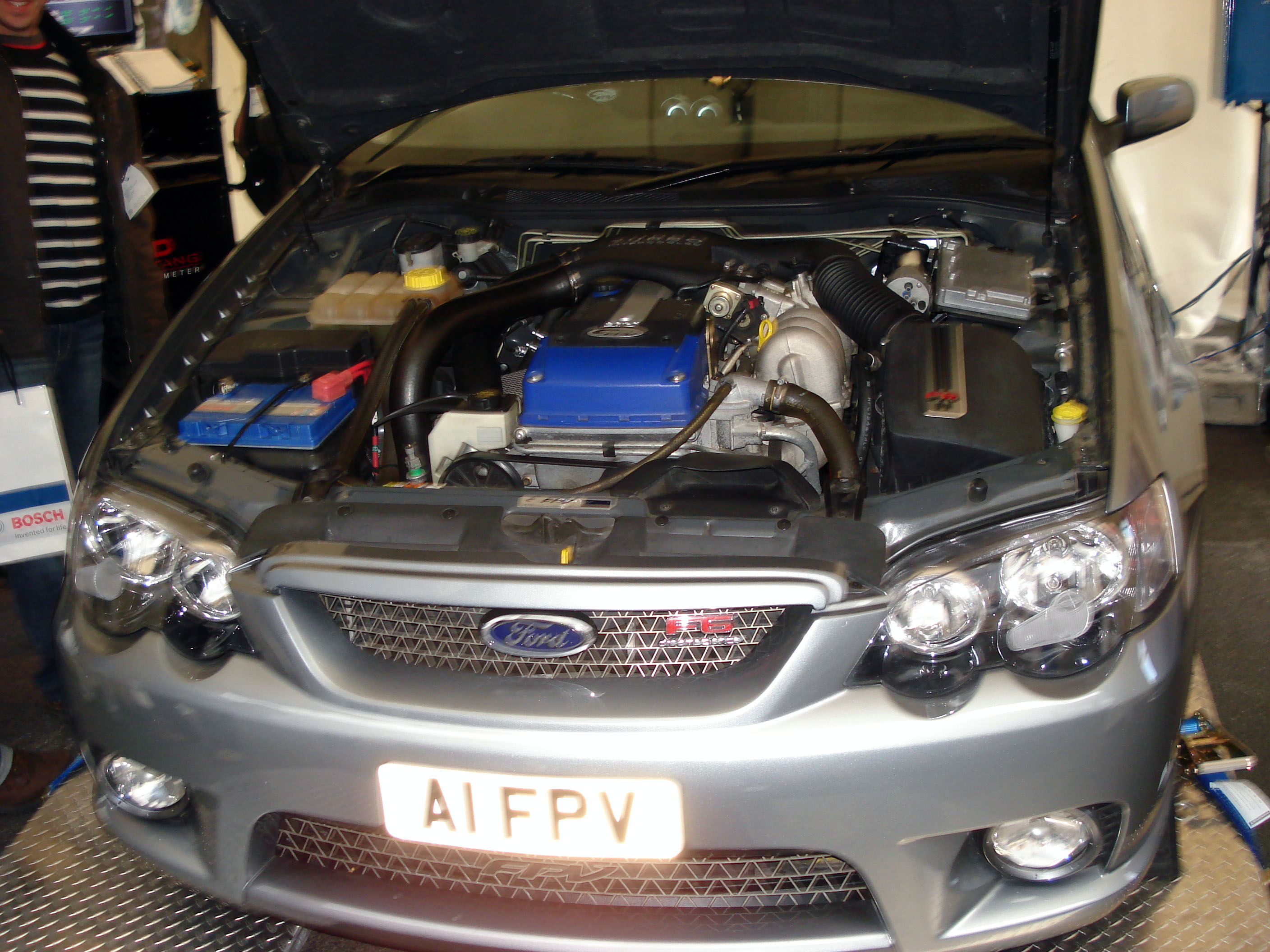
FPV F6 Typhoon, engine.

=== BF ===
This new range was launched in 2005 with engine specifications unchanged. All models shared the same six-speed manual and were now offered with an optional German made ZF six-speed automatic (the same as featured in Jaguars and BMWs). The GT received the GT-P's old 19-inch wheels, and the GT-P and Super Pursuit received their own specific road wheel styles. Typhoon & Tornado versions had optional 18-inch road wheel design used on the previous model, or a new 19-inch design with black spokes. All models also received new body kits, with the F6 Typhoon benefiting from its own unique styling changes. The F6 now had colour coded fog lamp surrounds, and a lower grill insert emphasizing the intercooler. The rear now had a new bumper with mesh inserts, a deeper diffuser, with the GT models now sporting a dual exit exhaust system cut into the diffuser.

Featured Models

- F6 Tornado
- F6 Typhoon
- GT
- GT-P
- Pursuit
- Super Pursuit

==== MkII update ====
No mechanical changes were introduced with this update; however, all models came standard with 19 inch rims. Subtle styling changes were made, but the most significant news was the introduction of new Force 6 and Force 8 models. Built to rival HSV's Senator Signature, they are mechanically identical to the auto-equipped GT model, but in a more luxury-focused package with more conservative visuals (no rear wing and more conservative colour range). The Force models are essentially an FPV version of the Fairmont Ghia (luxury model in the Falcon range).

In the final months of the BF MkII Falcon, a number of limited edition models were released - namely, the GT "40th Anniversary" (to commemorate the Falcon GT nameplate).; the F6 "R-Spec" Typhoon, which is the only limited edition turbo FPV and the only turbo Rspec ever; the GT "Cobra R-spec" sedan and utility (all of which received stiffer "R-Spec" dampers and, in the case of the sedan, a power increase to 405 hp (302 kW)

Featured Models

- F6 Tornado
- F6 Typhoon
- Force 6
- Force 8
- GT
- GT-P
- Pursuit
- Super Pursuit

Special editions

- F6 "R-spec" Typhoon
- GT "40th Anniversary Edition"
- GT "Cobra R-spec"
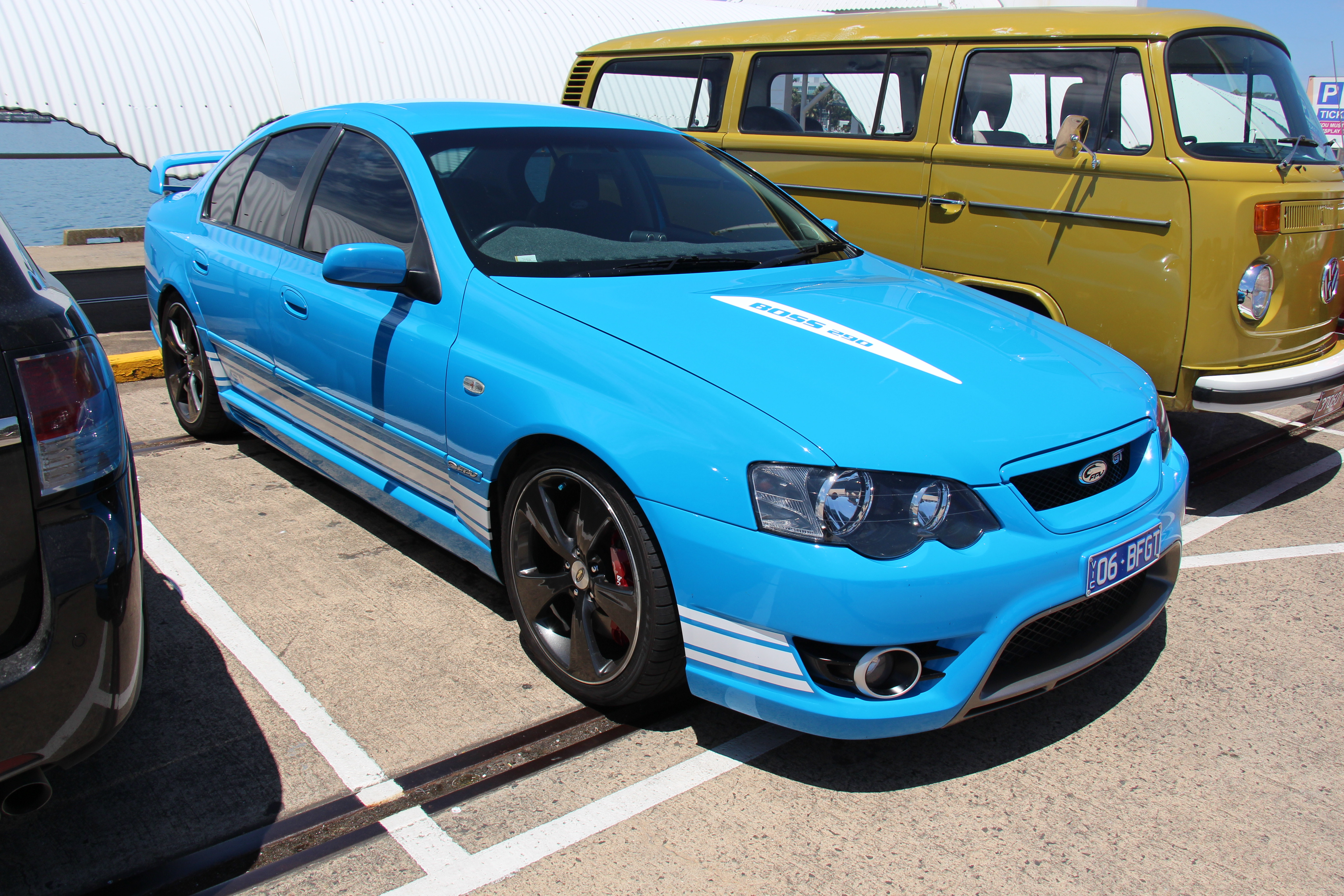
FPV GT (BF)

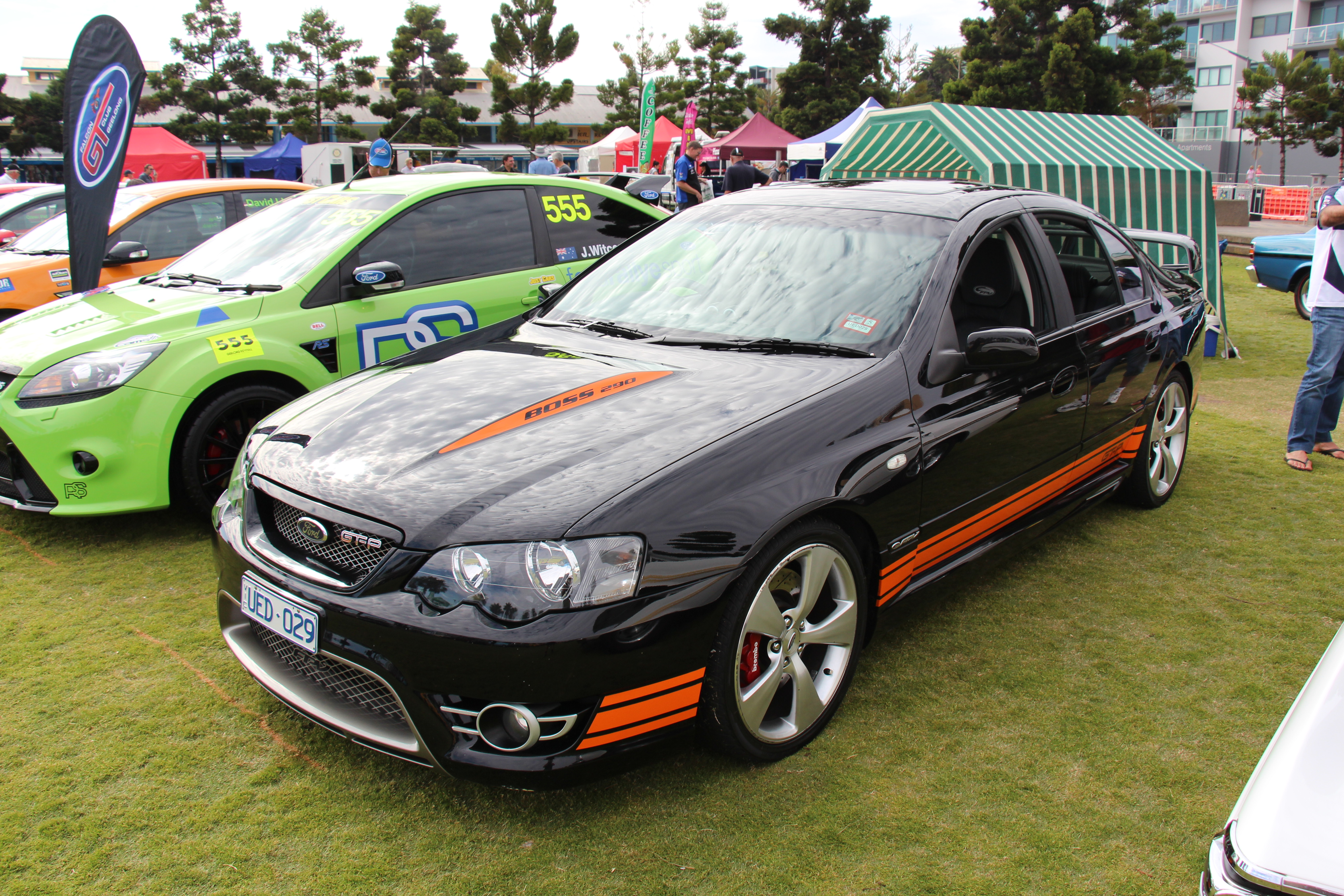
FPV GT-P (BF)

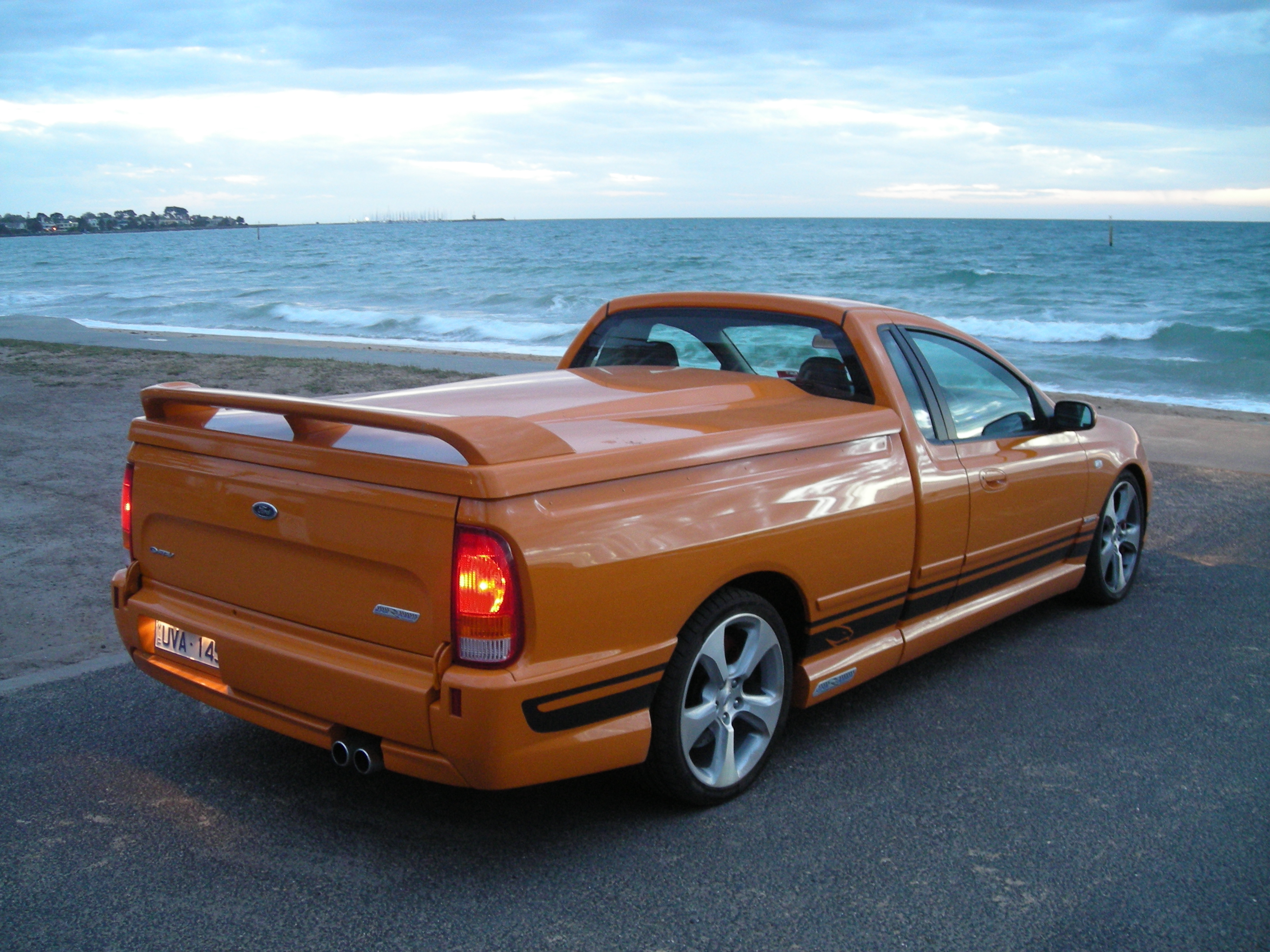
FPV Super Pursuit (BF)

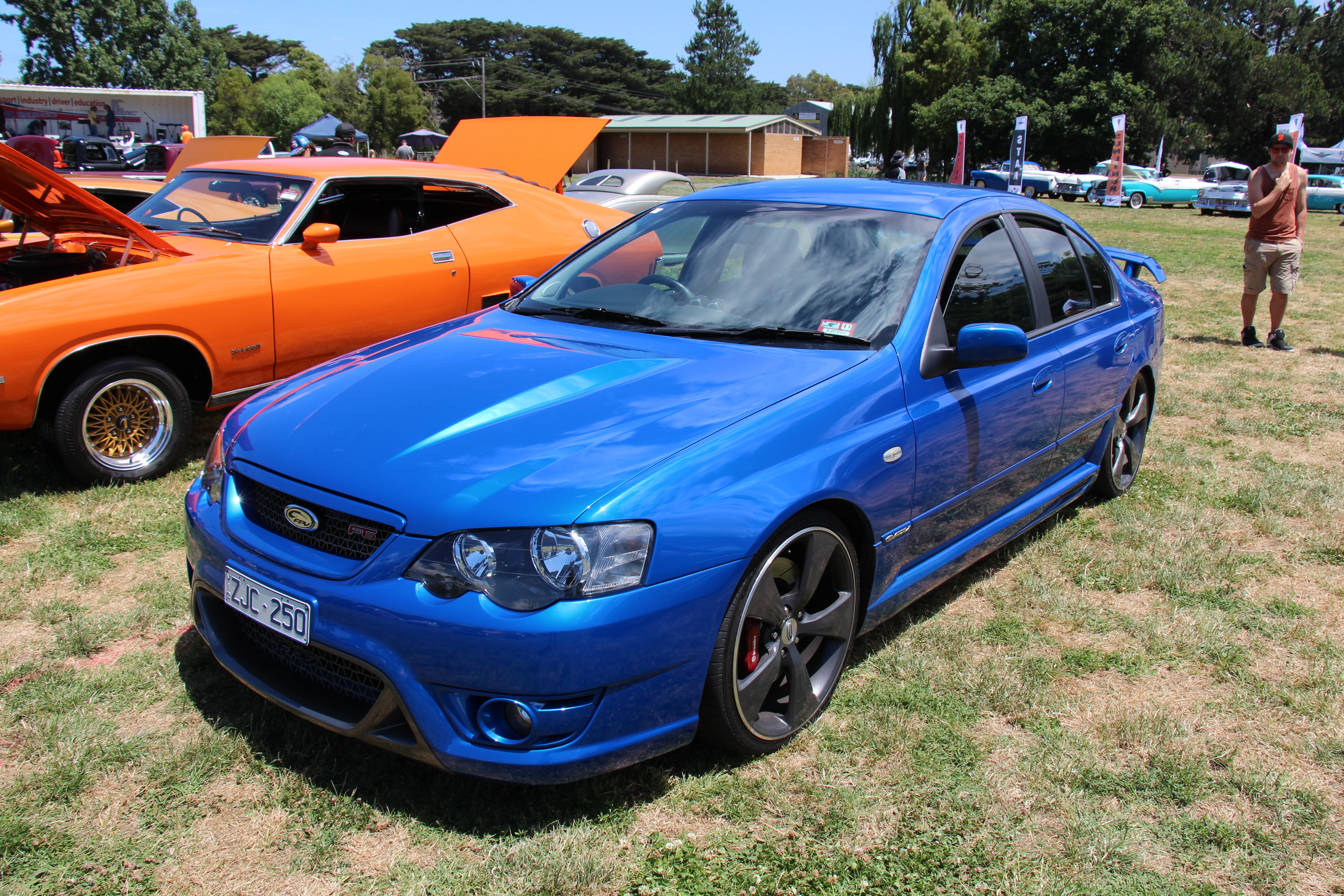
FPV F6 Typhoon (BF)

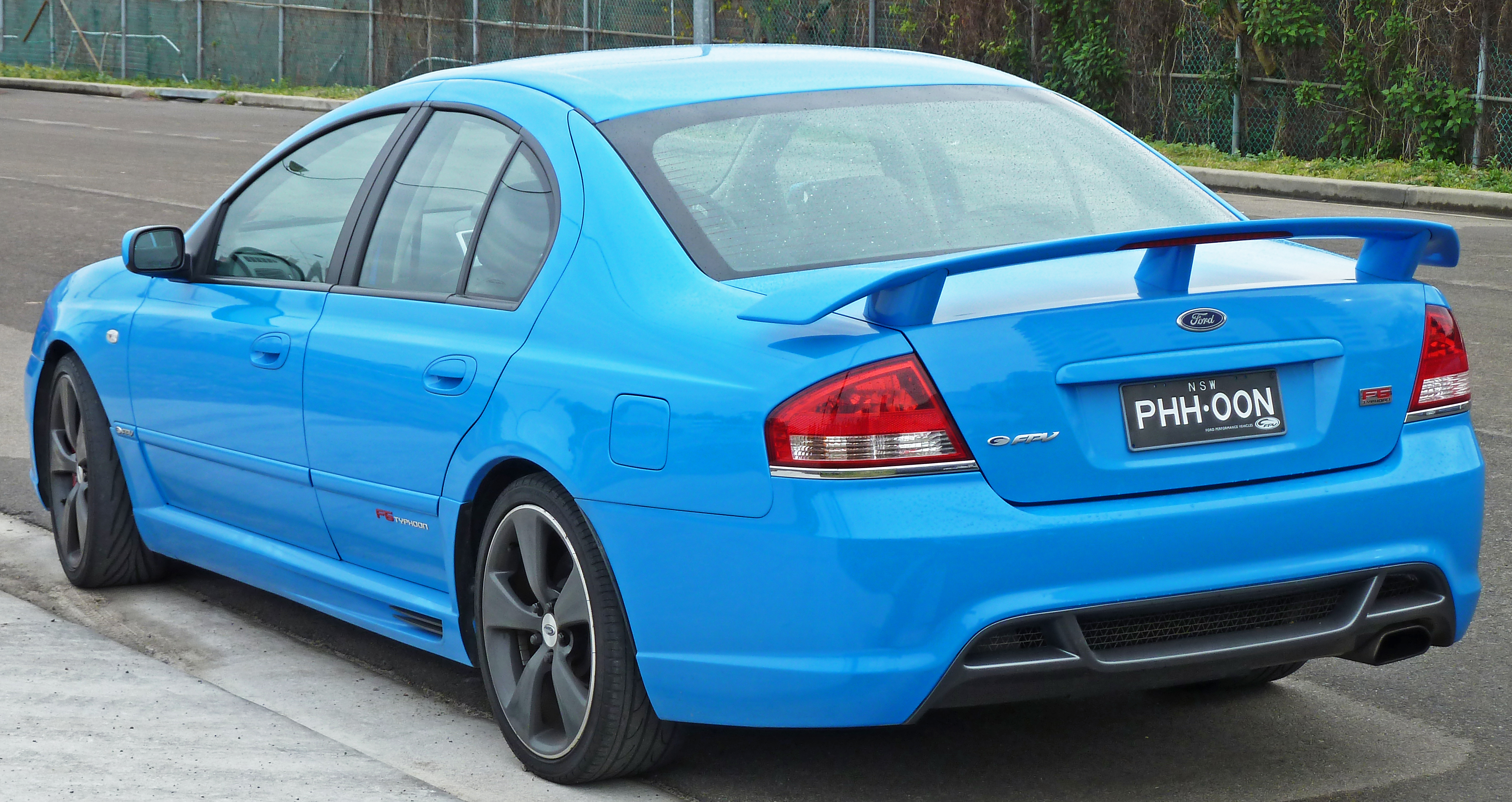
FPV F6 Typhoon (BF Mk II)

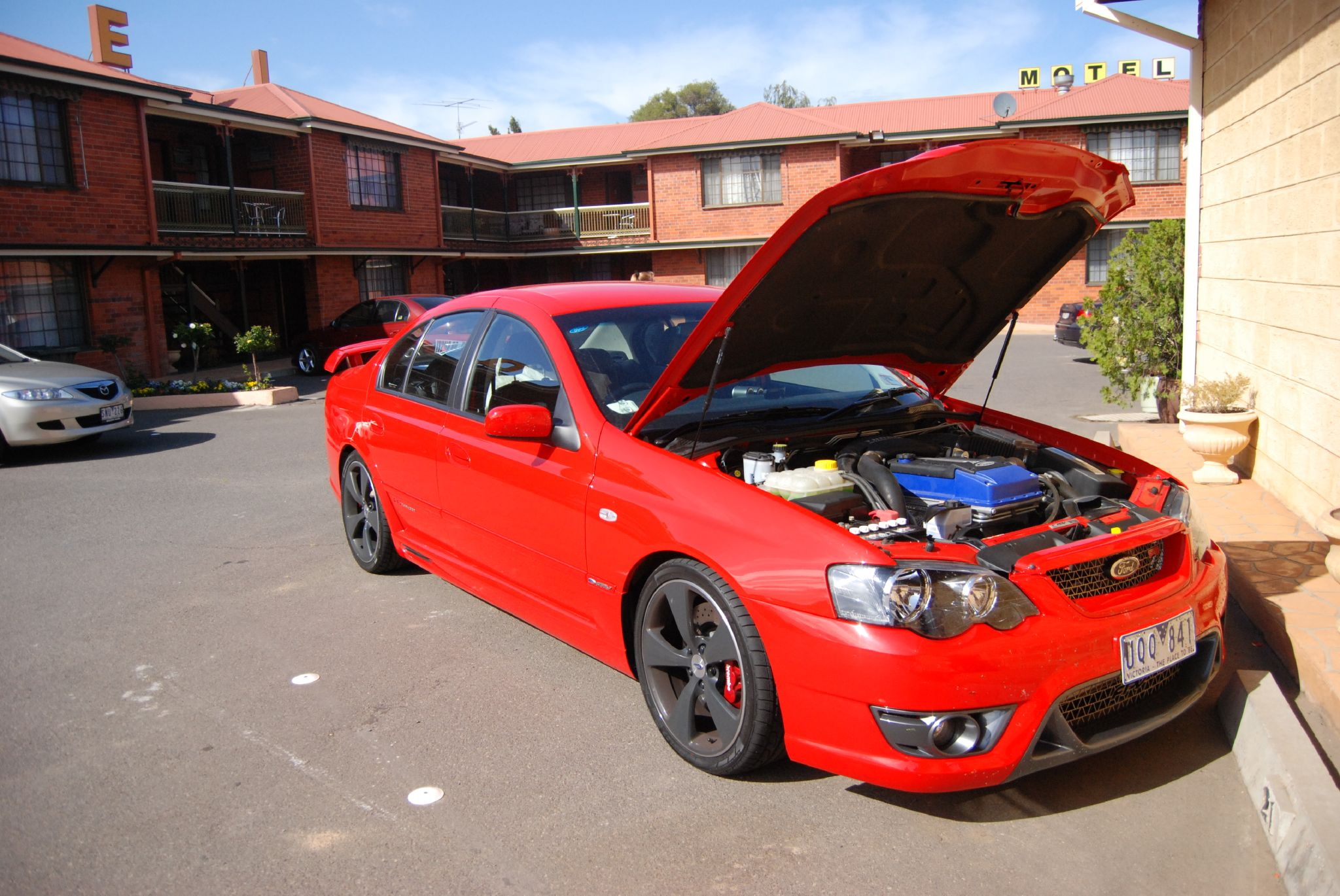
FPV F6 Typhoon R-Spec (BF)

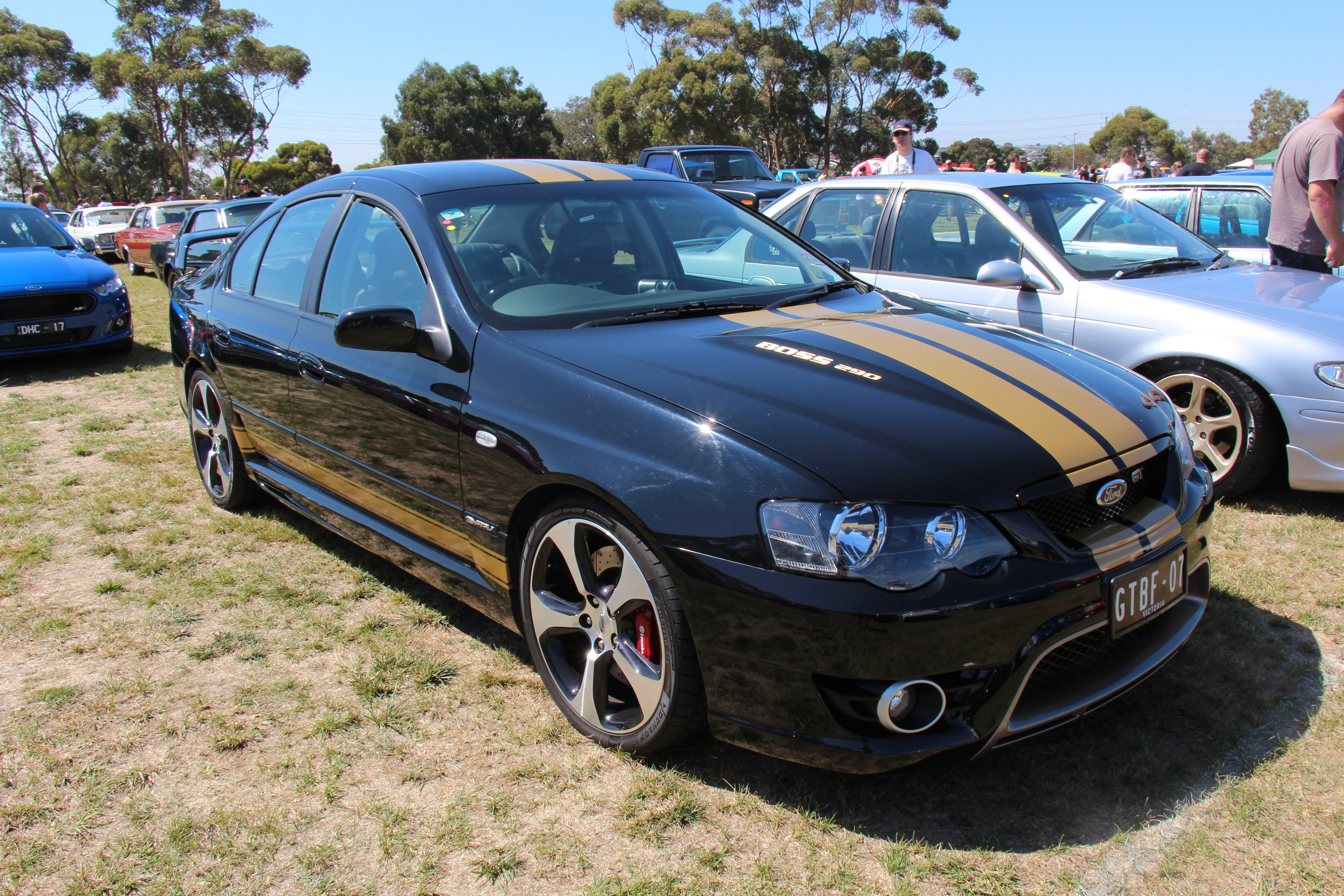
FPV GT 40th anniversary (BF)

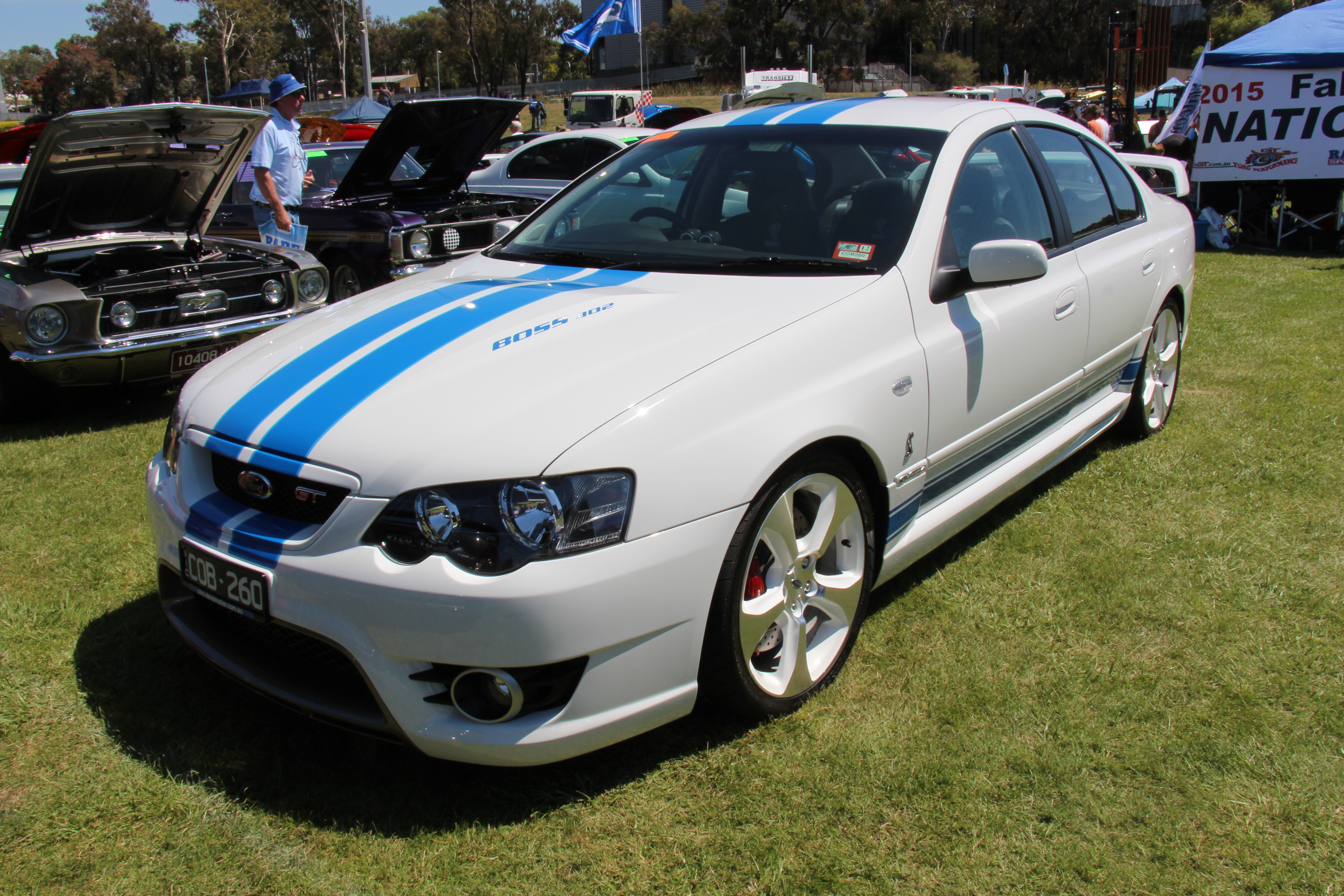
FPV GT Cobra (BF)

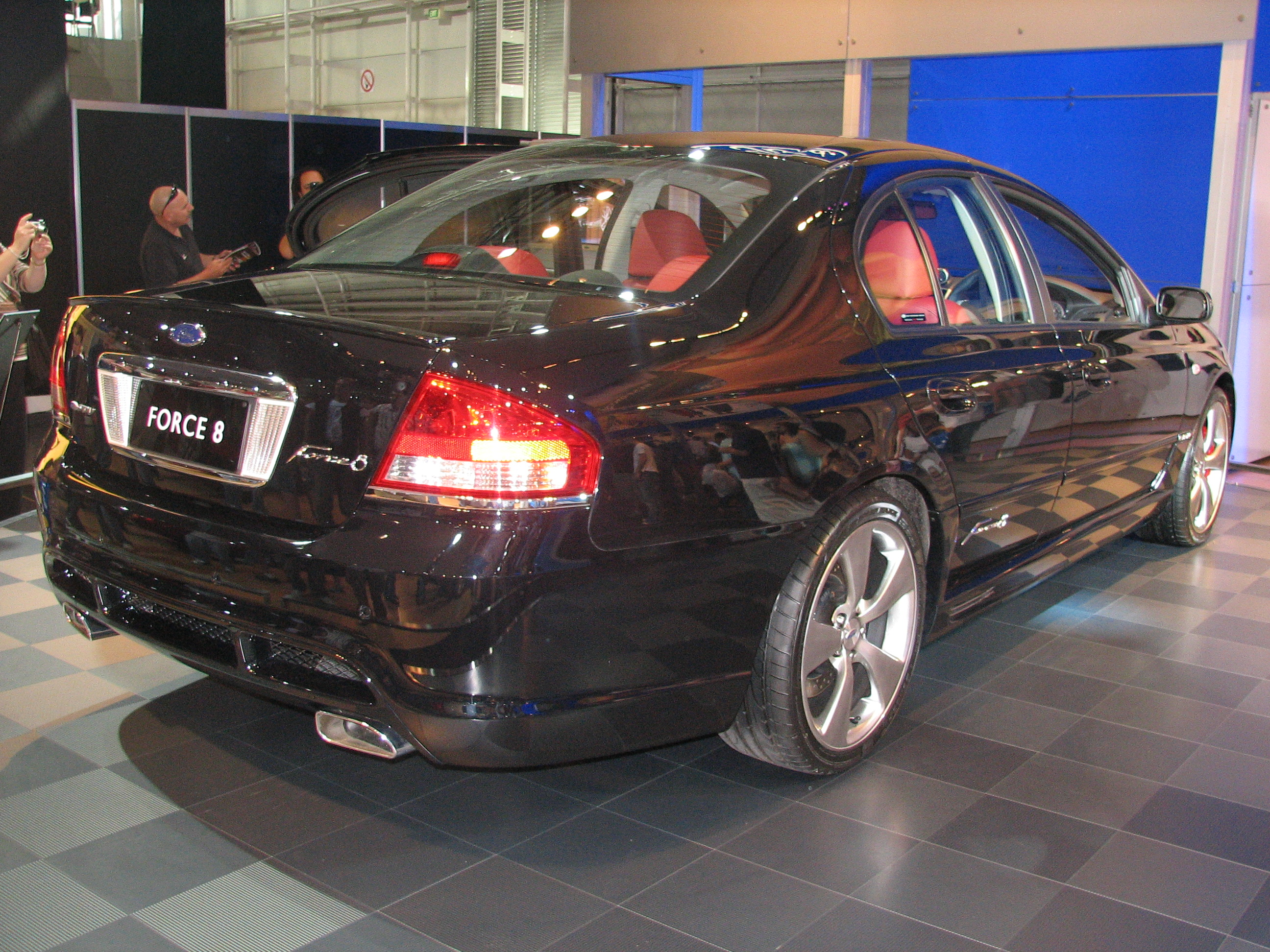
FPV Force 8 (BF)

=== FG ===
The FG series FPV was launched in 2008, based on the FG Falcon. The Typhoon and Tornado names were dropped for the F6.

4 limited editions GT's were released during the FG series, the first being the GT 5th Anniversary, celebrating 5-years since the start of FPV. The "Black Edition" followed, and the R-Spec and GT-F arriving in the MkII update.

Featured Models

- F6
- F6 E
- GT
- GT E
- GT-P
- Pursuit
- Super Pursuit

Special editions

- GT 5th anniversary
- GS

==== MY10 update ====
In October 2010 (before the FG MkII update), the 5.4 L V8 was replaced with the new 5.0 L Supercharged (Miami) V8. The GT range now produces 335 kW (449 hp) and the GS 315 kW (428 PS; 422 bhp). It is capable of a sub 5 second 0–100 km/h (0-62 mph) time, surpassing the HSV GTS in both power and torque. The decision was brought about because of pressure to convert to Euro IV emissions, which the 5.4 L was unable to pass.

The Pursuit was dropped in 2010.

Featured Models

- F6
- F6 E
- GS
- GT
- GT E
- GT-P

Special editions

- GT Black

==== MkII Update ====
The FPV range received the updates from the Falcon (FG) MkII range in December 2011, however, the GS sedan and utility received the cosmetic updates from the XR-series. In 2012 the Pursuit model was brought back as a limited-edition model.

FPV released the track focused version of the R-spec in 2012, using the current GT with its 335 kW (449 hp)/570 N⋅m (420 lb⋅ft) supercharged 5.0-litre V8 engine, creating Australia's fastest accelerating production car.

The GT-F 351 marked the end for the Ford Falcon GT / FPV GT model lines, the "F" standing for Final, and "351" paying homage to Falcon GTs of the 1960s and 1970s. It features a retuned version of the Coyote 5.0 litre V8 to produce 351 kW (471 hp), with over 400 kW (536 hp) available through over-boost when the conditions allow, the GT-F also gain's the handling upgrades from the R-spec. The exterior is identified through black highlights on the mirrors, spoiler and door handles, as well as a unique stripe package including a stripe running over the top of the car.

Featured Models

- F6
- F6 E
- GS
- GT
- GT E
- GT-P

Special editions

- GT R-spec
- Pursuit (in both R-spec and GT-F visuals)
- GT-F 351

GT-F "351"

Presented in June 2014, the GT-F 351 is the last Falcon-based GT sedan and last FPV model (along with the Pursuit Utility), with a total production of 500 reserved for Australia at $77,990 and another 50 for New Zealand. Its nomenclature was chosen to mean "F" for final whereas "351" is this GT-F's engine output in kW as well as a homage to the iconic 351 cu in (5.8 L) engine capacity of the 1970s GT Falcon (XW to XB series). Mechanically, the GT-F features launch control, standard Brembo six-piston front and four-piston rear brakes, the suspension and 275/35 R19 Dunlop Sports Maxx 9in rear tyre package from the limited edition GT R-spec and a retuned version of the supercharged Coyote "Miami" 5.0 L V8 engine (embossed "GT-F 351" instead of "Boss 335") developing a minimum of 351 kW (477 PS; 471 bhp) at 6,000 rpm of power (or, depending on prevailing conditions, over 400 kW (544 PS; 536 bhp) for 15–20 seconds thanks to a transient overboost function) but an unchanged 570 N⋅m (420 lb⋅ft) at 2,500-5,500 rpm of torque that is, however, available across a broader range. Inside, the GT-F is characterised by darker finishes, orange accents throughout (e.g. trim stitching, instrument facia and GT-F seat embroiding) and a build number plate complemented by a certificate. The exterior features stealth or black accents (specifically, the headlight and foglight bezels are black, as are the external mirrors, door handles, rear spoiler and diffuser, alloy wheels) and a unique GT-F stripe package (including over the roof of the car) that is available in different colours depending on exterior paints, which are Winter White, Silhouette (black), Kinetic (blue), Octane (orange) and Smoke (grey).

The NSW highway patrol acquired one of these last FPV GT sedans (build number 88 out of 500 allocated to the domestic market) which, as a unique special, had the engine tuned by Ford racing legend Dick Johnson to 600 kW (805 hp; 816 PS). This gave it far more power than Australian racing V8 Supercars and it is, as of 2015, Australia's most powerful police vehicle. It was commissioned by the NSW police force as a promotional car, although it is a fully equipped and operational highway patrol police vehicle.

FPV auctioned build number 001 and the last (for Australia) build number 500 on eBay, with a view to donate proceedings to the National Breast Cancer Foundation. These cars were sold for $236,100 and $157,600 and attracted 84 and 106 bids, respectively.

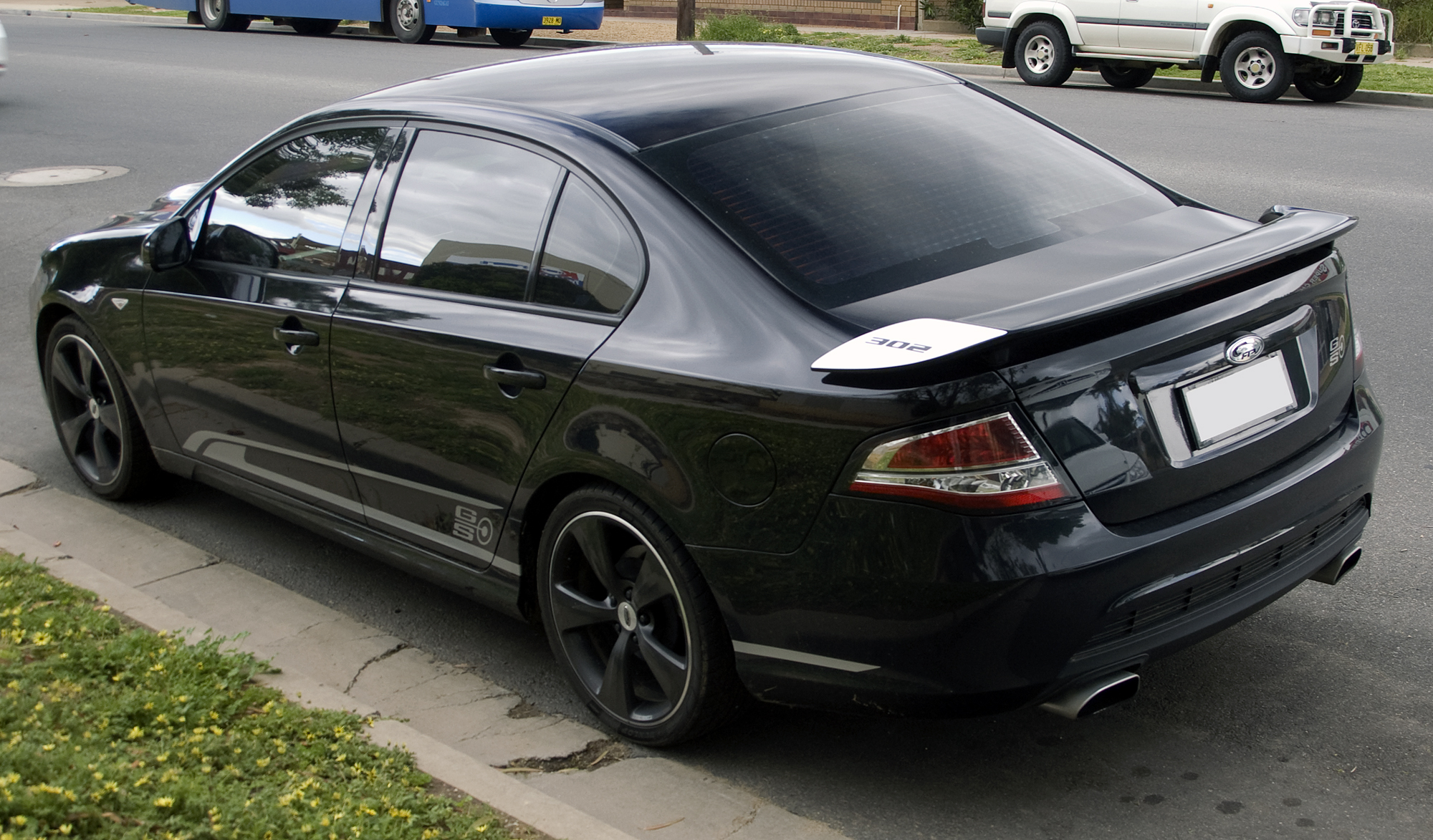
FPV GS (FG)

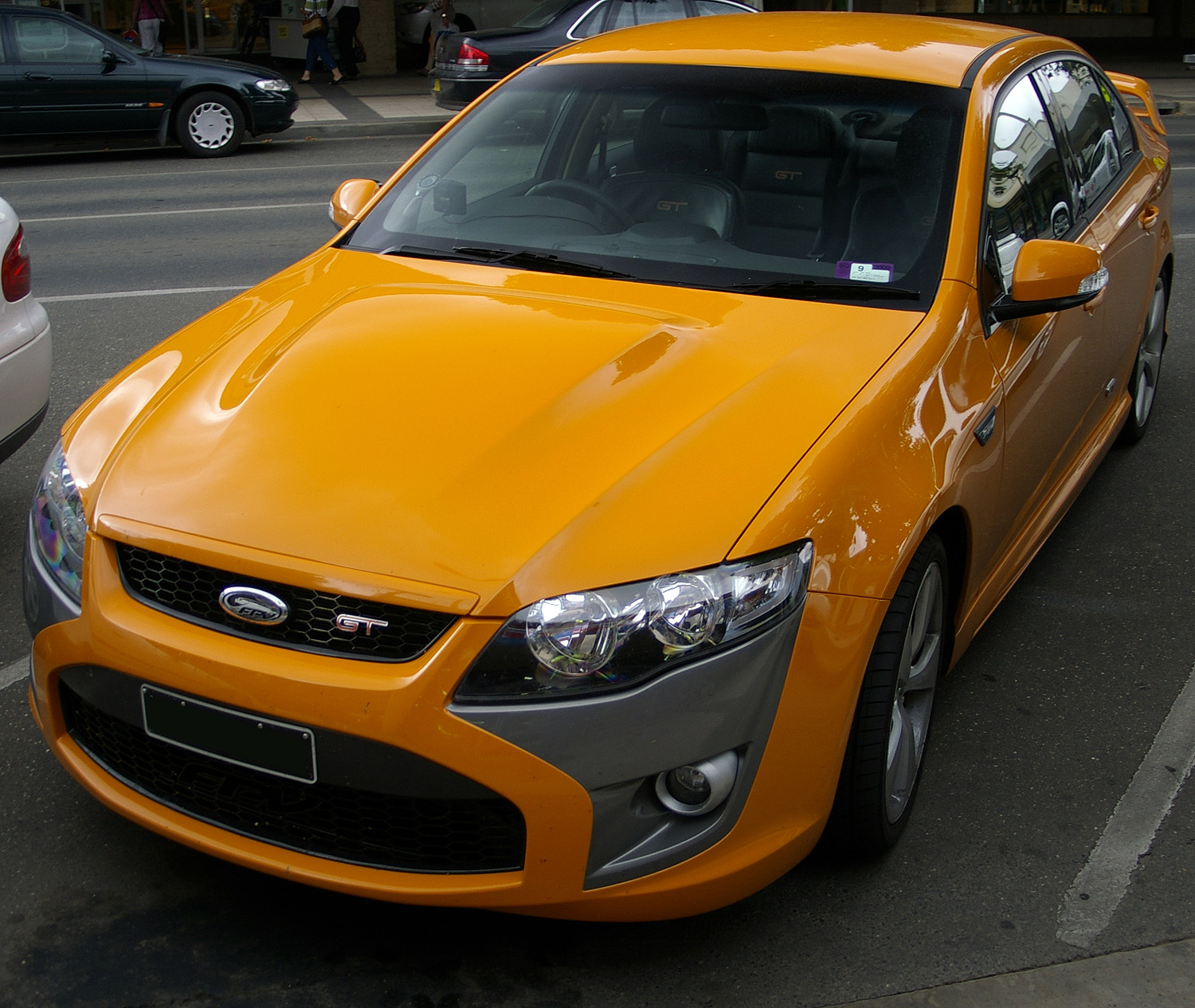
FPV GT (FG)

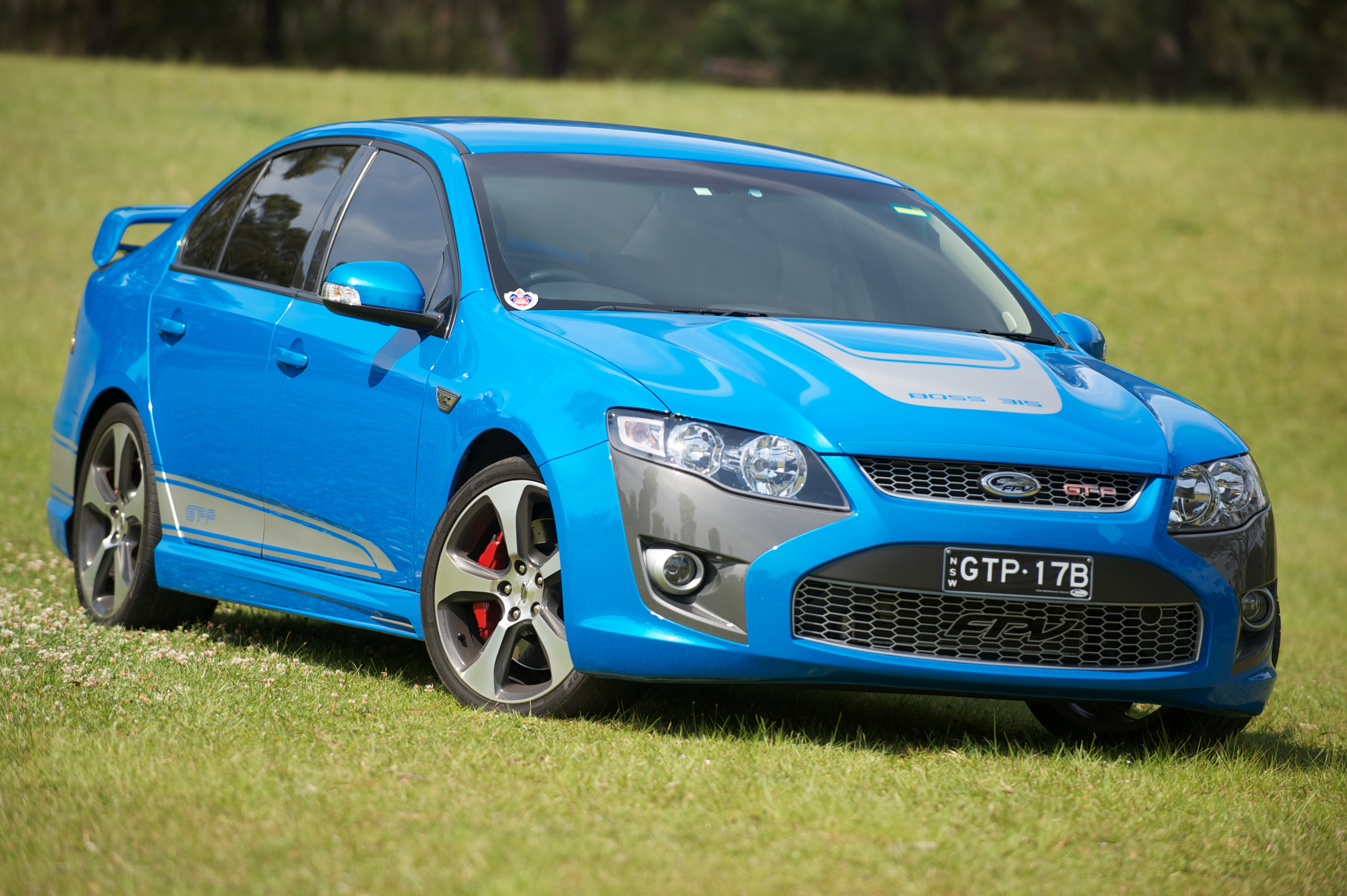
FPV GT-P (FG)

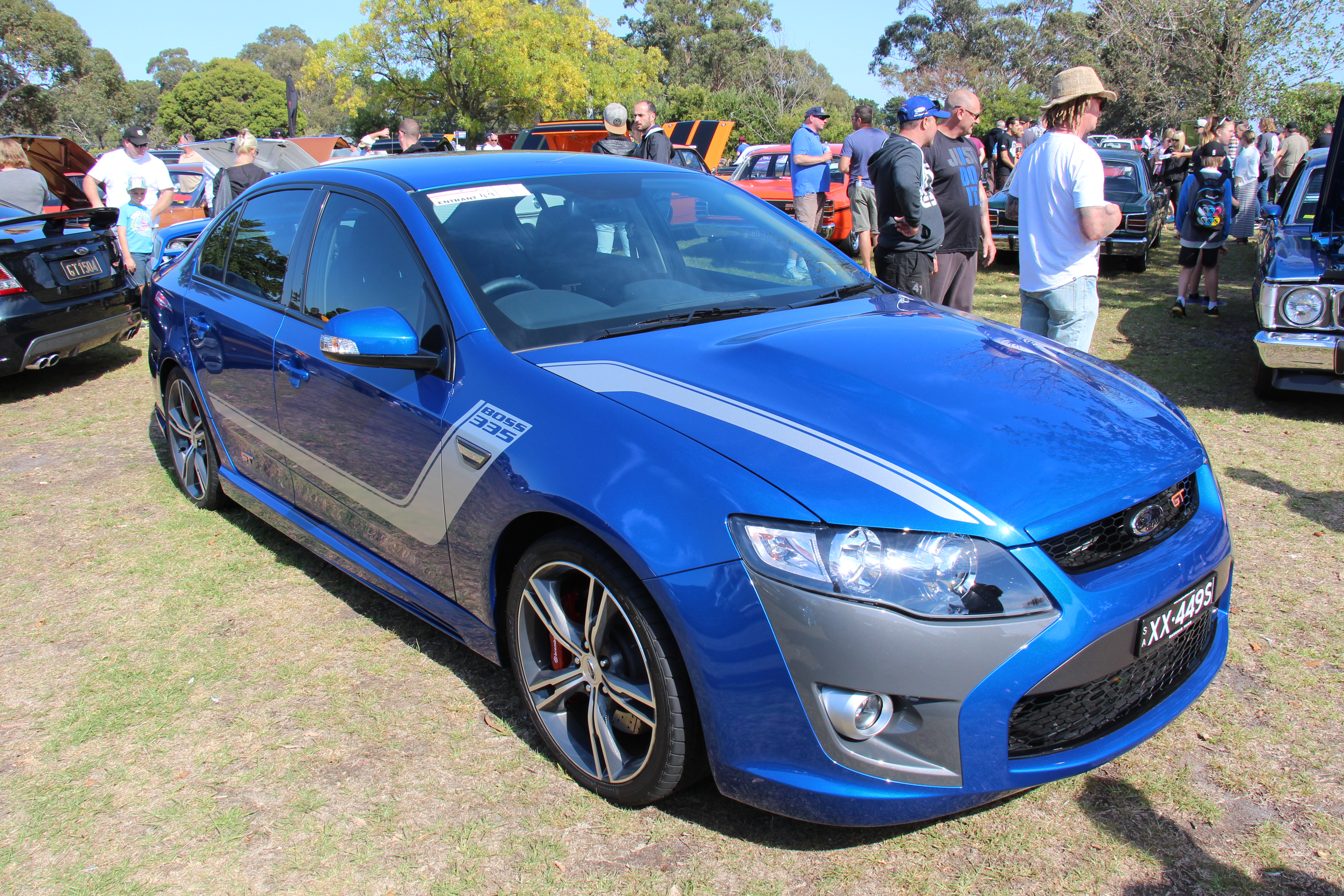
FPV GT (FG Mk II)

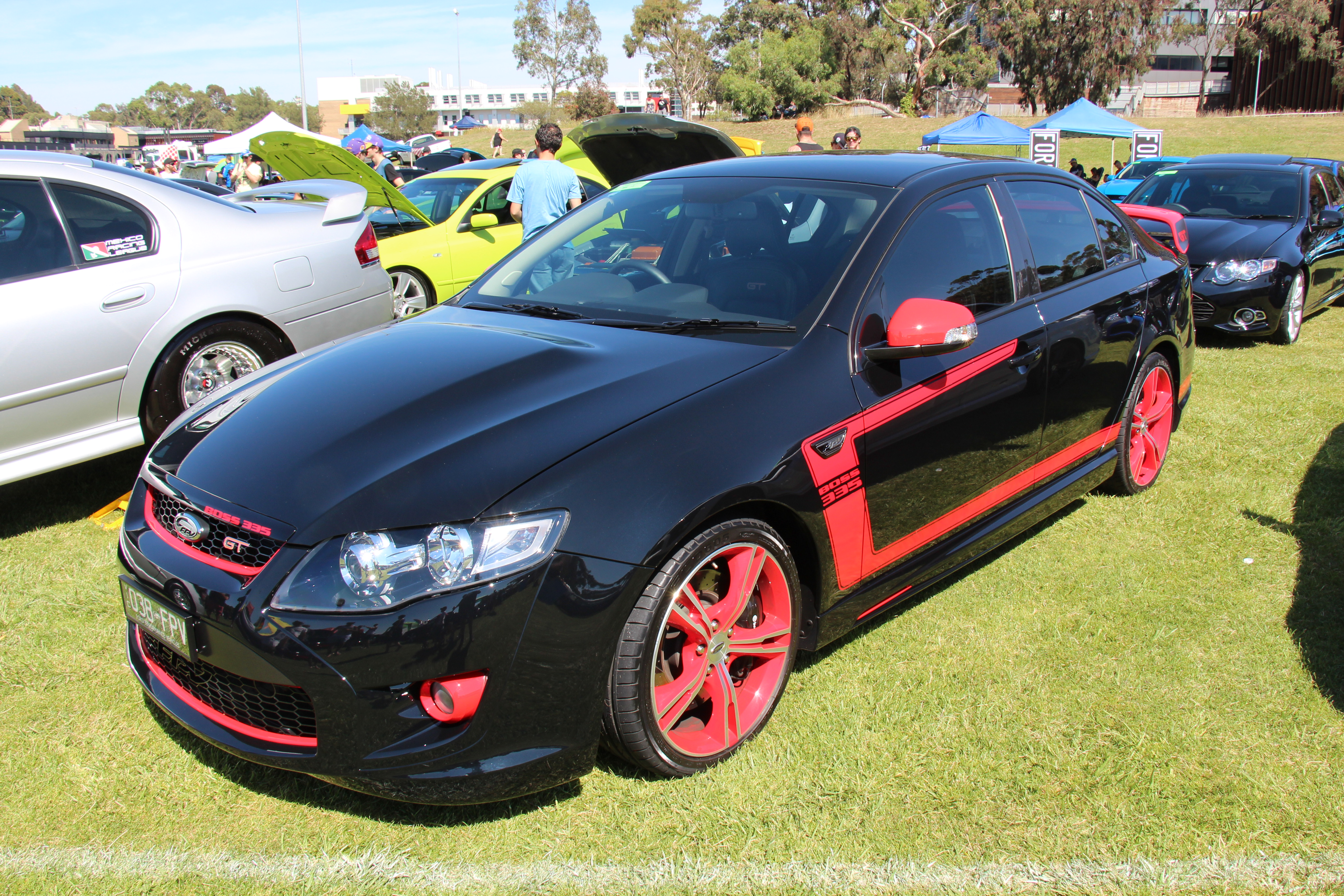
FPV GT R-Spec (FG)

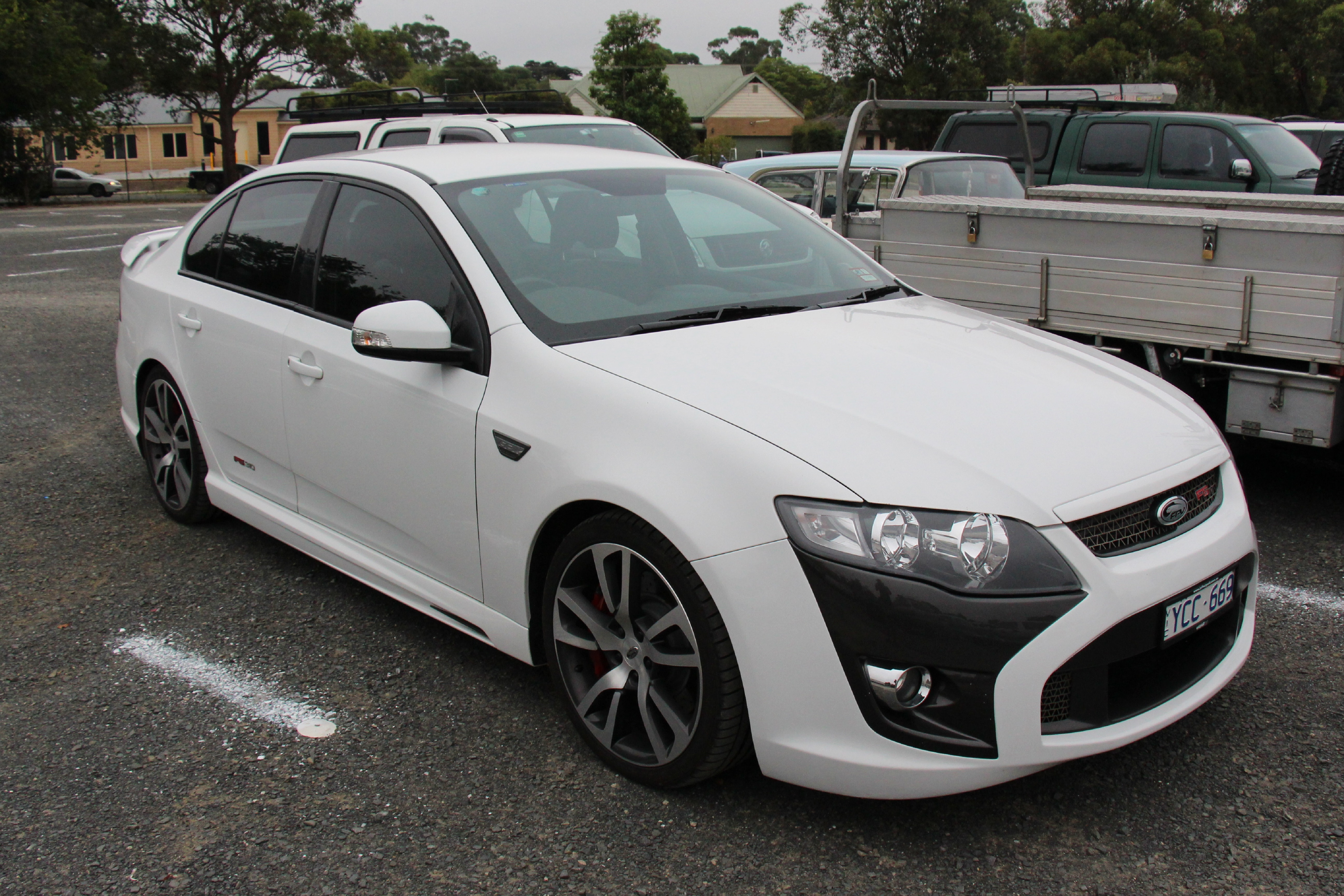
FPV F6 (FG)

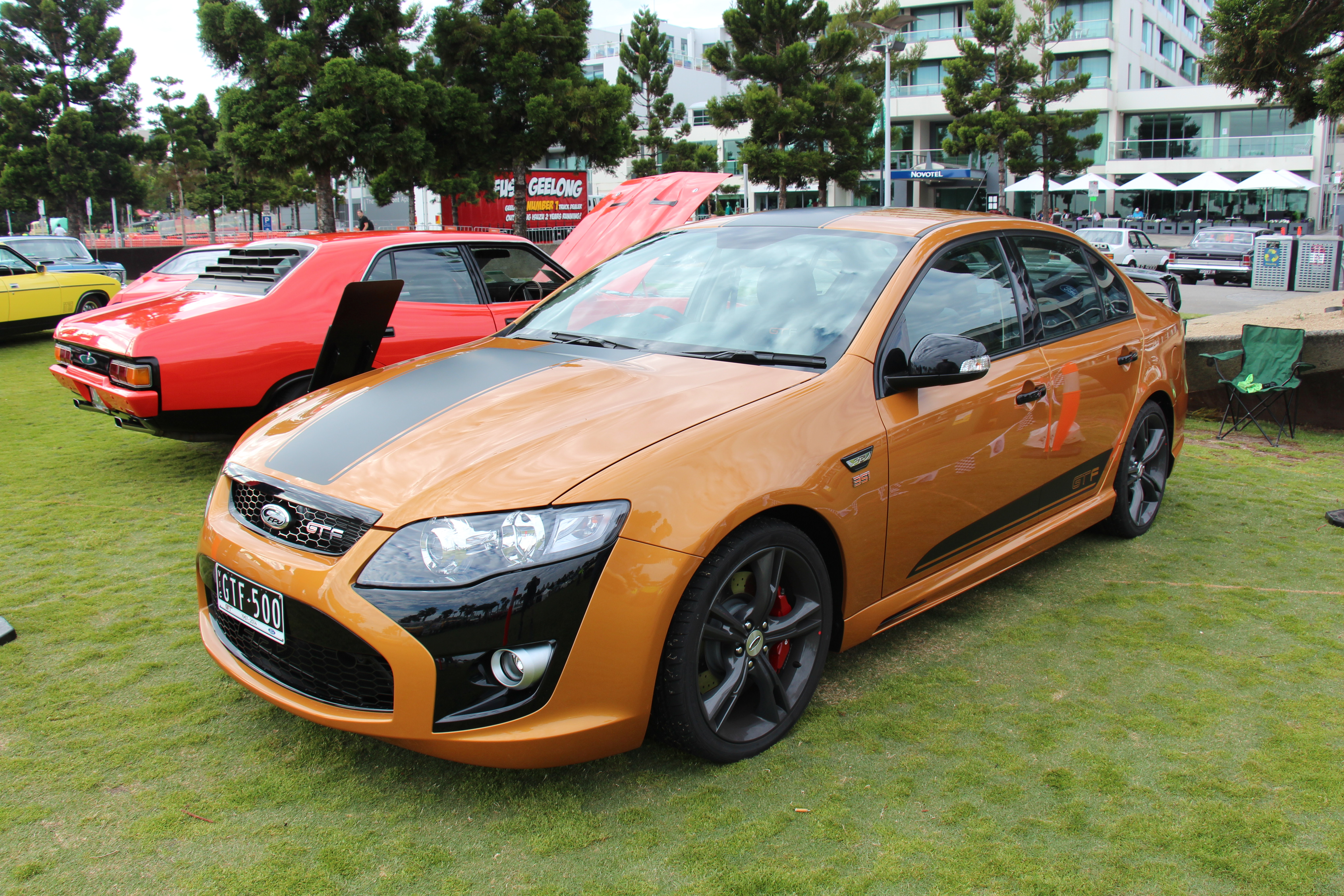
FPV GT-F (FG)

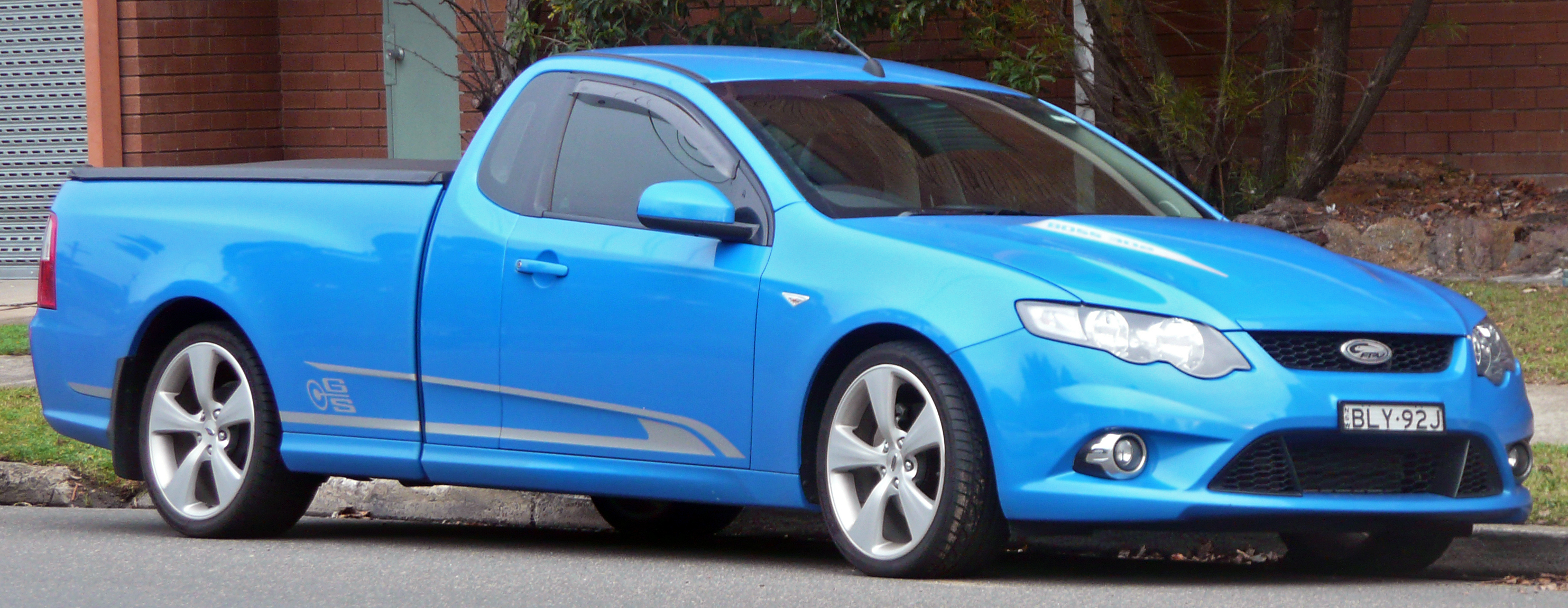
FPV GS utility (FG)

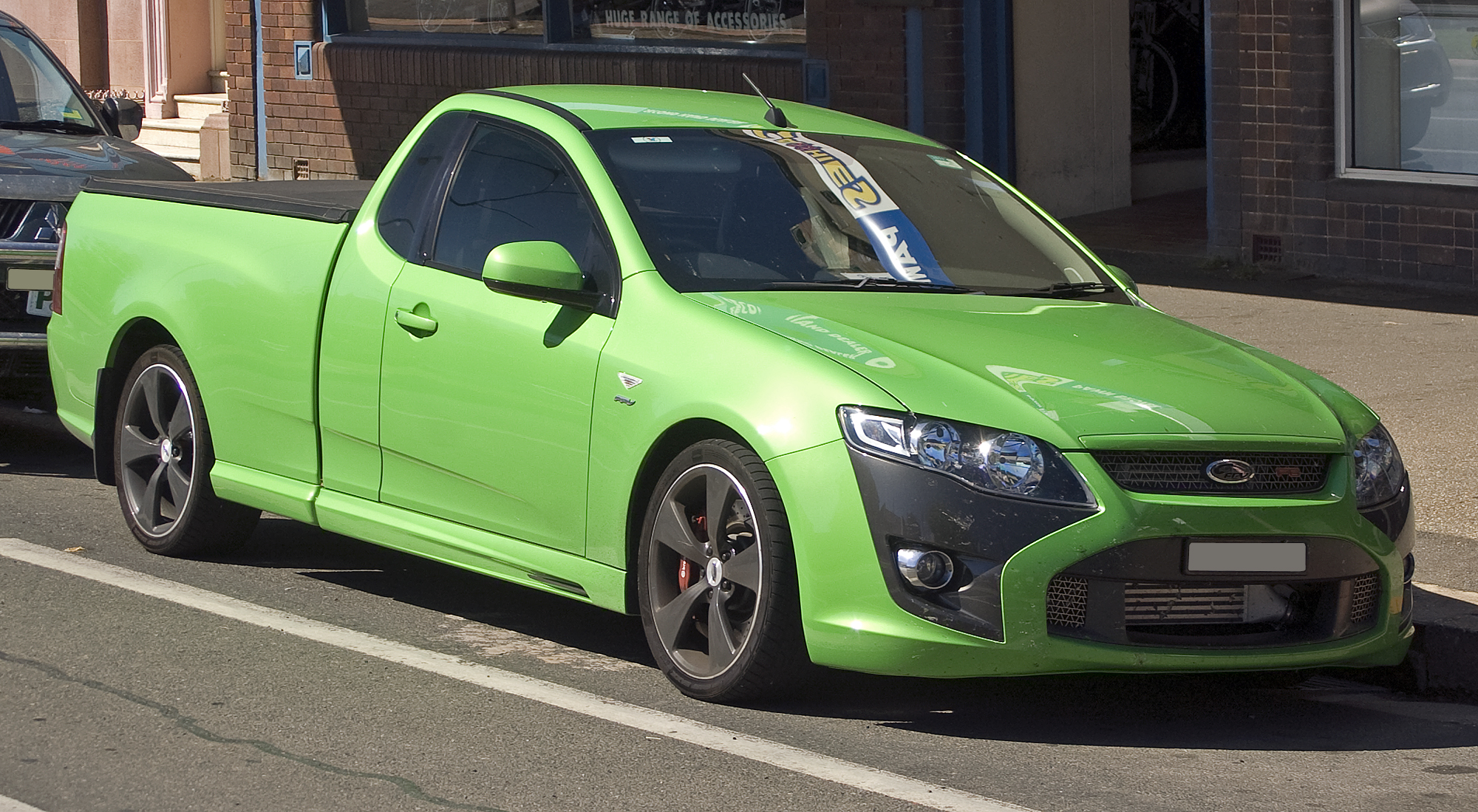
FPV F6 utility (FG)

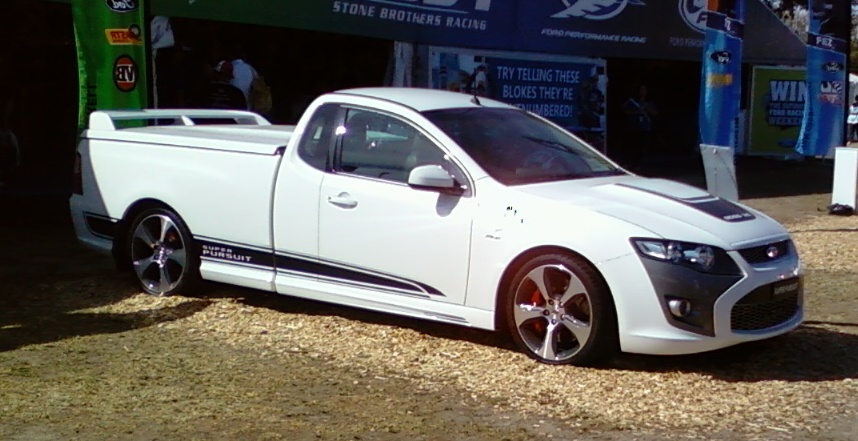
FPV Super Pursuit utility (FG)

=== SY ===
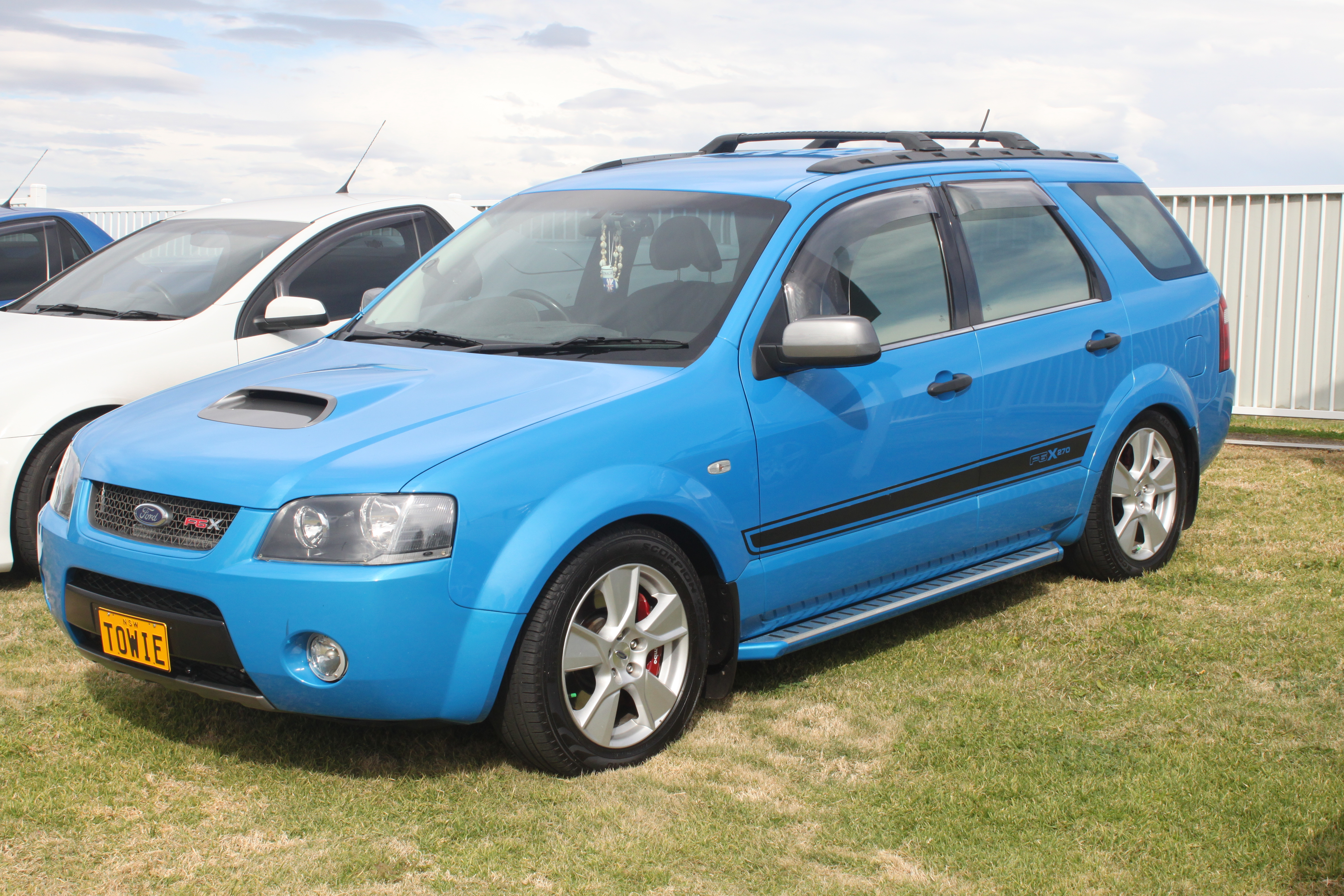
FPV F6X

In January 2008, Ford Performance Vehicles unveiled the FPV F6X, a SUV, the first non-Falcon-based model to be produced by FPV, with a turbocharged Barra engine producing 270 kW (367 PS; 362 bhp) and 550 N⋅m (406 lb⋅ft). The F6X was discontinued in 2009.

== Concept Cars ==
Galaxie 540

During a 2004 FPV open day, FPV had a clay model of a Fairlane on display. It Featured a custom front end with GT headlamps and bonnet, and a custom bodykit.

Territory P-SUV

For a 2007 open day, FPV had a Territory-based concept on display. The P-SUV had an open rear section behind the rear seats. The floor of the open rear section and its extension was covered in machine finish metal sheets with the same material covering the fold-down rear seat backs.

GT "Black Edition" concept

For the 2011 Melbourne motor show, FPV displayed the "FLPV concept" (commonly known as the "Black Edition"), based on the just released supercharged 335 kW (449 hp) GT series. It featured an all-black appearance, and a unique front bumper and staggered wheel design at the time considered to be available on future FPV products. However, these failed to make an appearance, with only the use of wider rear wheels making the R-spec and GT-F limited editions.

== Engines ==
=== 5.4L Modular "Boss" V8 ===
Boss 290

Based on the cast iron 4V DOHC Boss short blocks sourced from Windsor, Ontario, the Boss engines include some locally sourced parts such as intake and pistons coupled with DOHC 4-valve cylinder heads from the Mustang Cobra R engine. FPV named this uniquely tuned engine as the Boss 290 because of its power output. It produced 290 kW (394 PS; 389 bhp) at 5,500 rpm and 520 N·m (380 lb·ft) of torque at 4,500 rpm.

Boss 302

For the BFII FPV GT Cobra special edition, the Boss 302 was created. The GT Cobra motor produced 405 hp (302 kW) and 398 lb·ft (540 N·m)). The Boss 302 motor was also added to all V8-powered FPV models until the release of the FG in 2008.

Boss 315

For the FG MkI, the 5.4 was further tuned to produce 315 kW (428 PS; 422 bhp) and 551 N·m (406 lb·ft). FPV achieved this through a new camshaft profile, new camshaft timing, strengthened piston assembly and a higher compression ratio (10.5:1 to 10.8:1). A 302kw detuned version of this engine was used for the limited edition FPV GS in the FG range.

=== 5.0L Coyote "Miami" V8 ===
In October 2010 FPV retired the 5.4L Boss V8, in favour of a new supercharged 5.0L V8. The project, codenamed "Miami", is based on the Coyote 5.0 litre V8 and is a supercharged alloy quad cam engine. It has cost FPV $40 million and has taken 3 years to develop. The engine was offered in three versions, Boss 315, 335 and finally 351.

With the closure of FPV, the Boss 335 engine was used in the returning XR8 model with the FG-X range. Another variation was developed for the special edition XR8 sprint, that developed 345 kW (463 hp; 469 PS).

Boss 315

Used in the entry level GS sedan and ute, the Boss 315 produces 315 kW (428 PS; 422 bhp) at 5,750 rpm and 545 N·m (402 lb·ft) between 2,000 - 5,500 rpm.

Boss 335

Available in the GT range, the Boss 335 kW (455 PS; 449 bhp) between 5,750 - 6,000 rpm and 570 N⋅m (420 lb⋅ft) between 2,200 - 5,500 rpm. The latter is offered in the GT range, which includes GT, GT-P, and GT-E. Fuel economy was improved dropping 4.5% to 13.7 L/100 km for the auto and 13.6 L/100 km for the manual.

Boss 345

Exclusive to the FG X XR8 Sprint, the Boss 345 developed 345 kW of power and 575 Nm of torque, with base torque figures being just 1 Nm shy of the XR6 Sprint. In favourable atmospheric conditions, overboost mode raised the output to 400 kW / 650 Nm, being equal with the figures produced by the FPV GT-F. The Boss 345 had the build number inscribed onto the top of the engine, instead of any reference to power figures as with previous iterations.

Boss 351

This is a specially tuned variant of the 5.0L unique to the GT-F, similar to the Cobra before it, the 351 is a reference to the Cleveland engines offered in the Falcon in the past. The engine is capable of up to 15 per cent more power and torque, equivalent to over 400 kW (536 hp; 544 PS) and 650 N⋅m (479 lb⋅ft), when the conditions allow.

=== 4.0L "Barra" I6 ===
Barra 270

For the BA/BF F6 Typhoon and Tornado models, the boost from the Garrett GT3540 turbocharger was increased over the Barra 240, producing 270 kW (362 hp; 367 PS) at 5,250 rpm and 550 N⋅m (406 lb⋅ft) of torque at 2,000-4,000 rpm

Barra 310

With the FG series, the Garret GT3540 was retained as opposed to the smaller GT3576 used in the FG XR6 Turbo. This is the most powerful engine with 310 kW (416 hp; 421 PS) at 5,250 rpm and 565 N⋅m (417 lb⋅ft) of torque at 1,950-5,200 rpm (and the first to produce more than 100 hp (75 kW) per litre) manufactured in Australia. As a result, the F6's rolling acceleration from 80–120 km/h (50–75 mph) is 2.8 seconds.

Barra 325

Exclusively fitted to the FGX XR6 Turbo Sprint. It was essentially a Barra 270T with a Garrett GT3540 and revised carbon fibre intake.

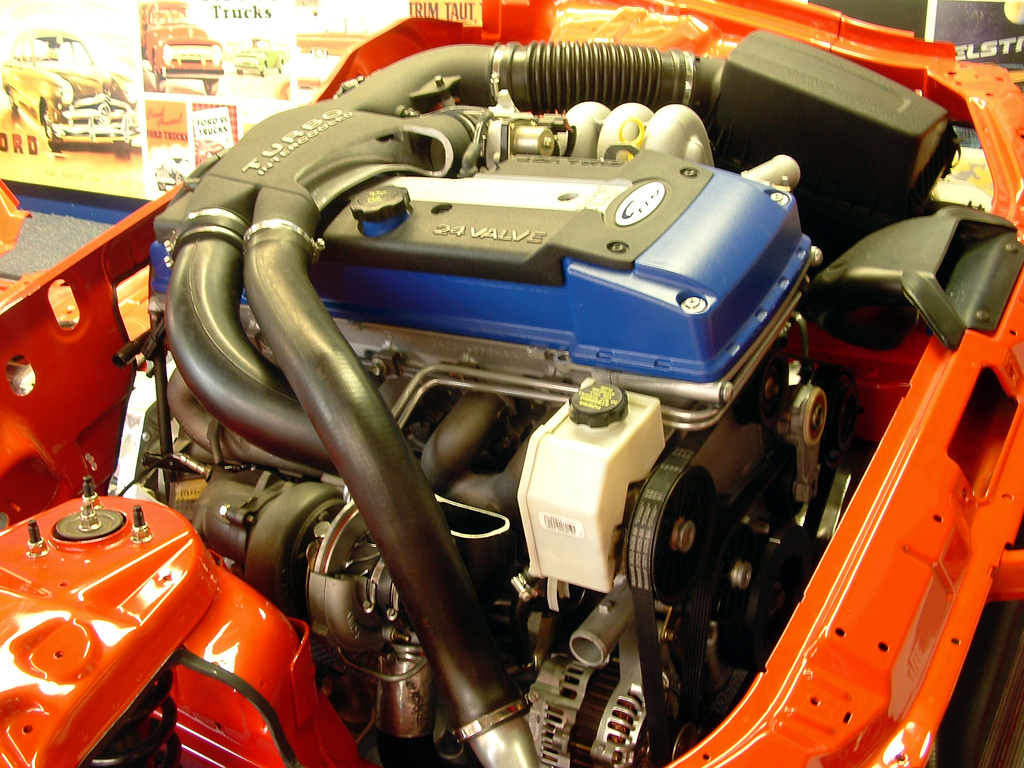
FPV Barra 270T 6-cylinder

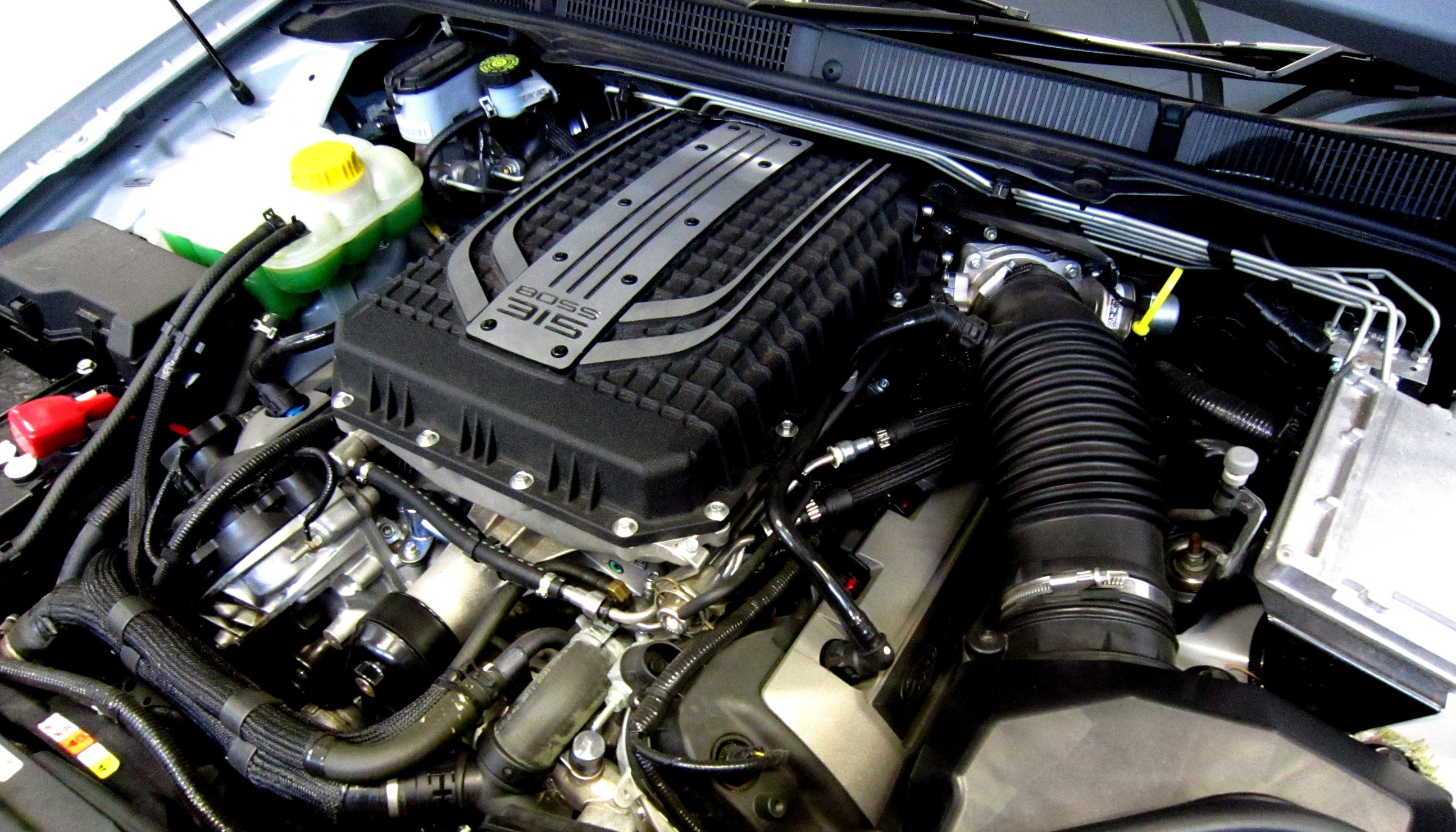
2011 FPV GS BOSS 315

== Motorsport ==
=== V8 Supercars ===
Ford Performance Racing (FPR) was created by Prodrive in 2003 to establish a link between the FPV road car range and the Ford Falcon V8 Supercars. Given the team's massive budget, its early results were disappointing but a form reversal in 2006 saw the team finish second in the Teams' standings. Mark Winterbottom also placed second in the Drivers Championship in 2008. In January 2013 the team was sold by Prodrive to Rusty French and Rod Nash. The team achieved their first Bathurst 1000 victory in 2013 with Mark Winterbottom and Steven Richards driving a Falcon FG. In 2015, Ford Performance Racing was renamed as Prodrive Racing Australia as a result of Ford's decision to progressively withdraw its V8 Supercars support by 2016.

FPR drivers have included Craig Lowndes, Glenn Seton, Greg Ritter, David Brabham, David Besnard, Jason Bright, Mark Winterbottom, Steven Richards and Will Davison.

=== Drifting ===
FPV created a show car dubbed the 'DRIF6' - an F6 Typhoon with modifications making the car suitable for competitive drifting. The car was entered into the national-level Drift Australia Series in 2006, where it was driven by Adam 'Newtonmeter' Newton. One of the car's main objectives was to expose the FPV brand to a younger audience than its usual, traditional V8-driving crowd.

Apart from Adam Newton, only Gary Myers of Summernats Burnout fame has driven the car. Gary drove the F6 for Street Machine Magazine, and commented the vehicle had incredible power.

The F6 drift car managed to score a best qualifying position of 5th at Mallala Motorsport Park in Adelaide, South Australia. In the Queensland Round of racing, the car suffered damage when Warren Luff, a professional race driver, took to the wheel for a few demo laps. Under Warren's control the car only made the end of the back straight of Queensland Raceway before it was turned passenger side first into the wall and Warren ended up in hospital with a fractured nose.

The damaged vehicle made an appearance in China to bolster one of its sponsors agendas. Ford Australia brought the vehicle back to Australia and it can be seen at the Ford Australia Discovery Centre in Geelong Victoria.

== See also ==
- Tickford Vehicle Engineering
