= FPV F6 =

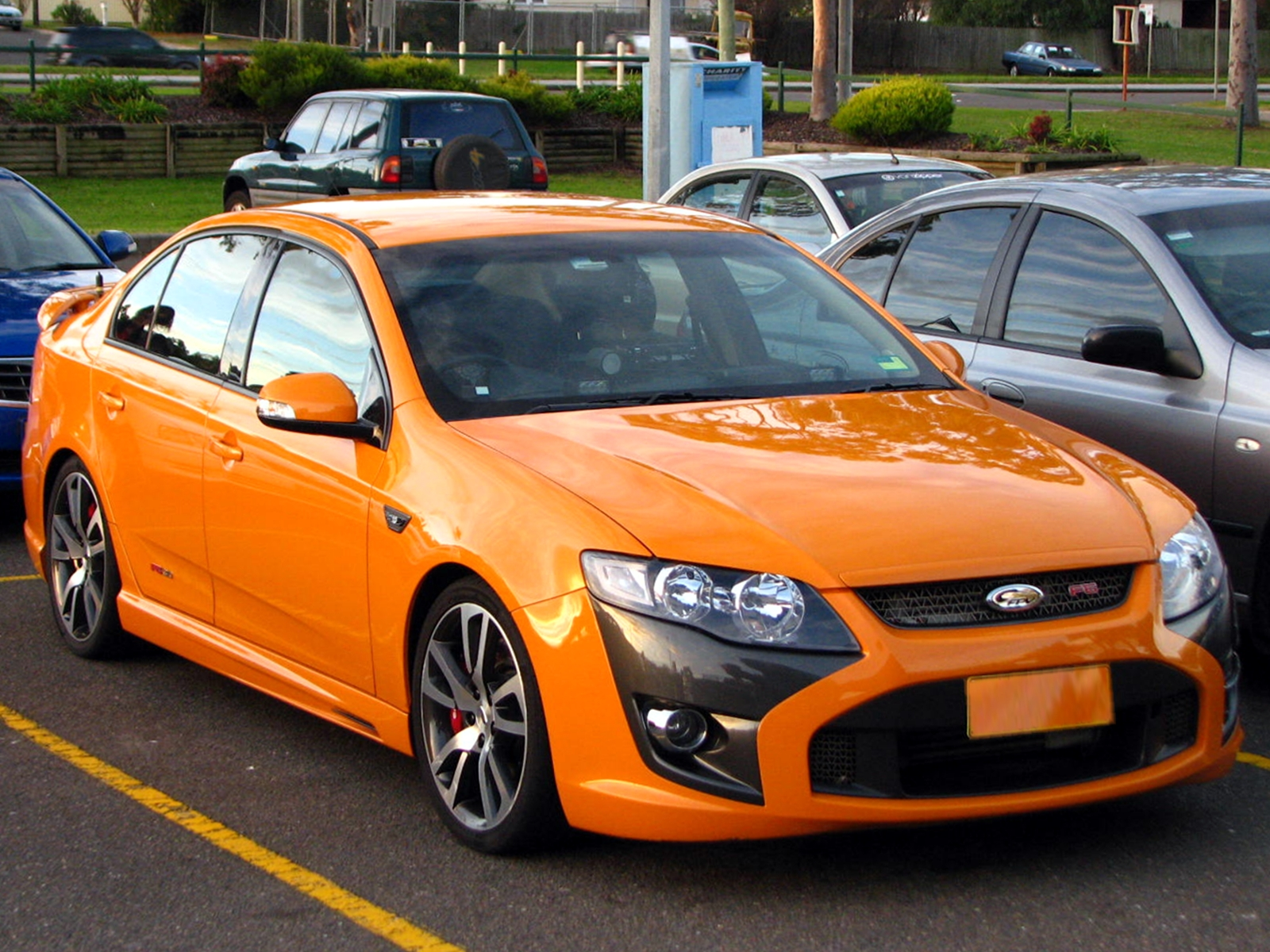
- FPV F6 (FG)

Overview
- Manufacturer: Ford Performance Vehicles
- Production: 2004–2014

Body and chassis
- Class: Full-size car
- Body style: 4-door sedan 2-door utility
- Related: Ford Falcon; FPV GS; FPV GT; FPV Pursuit

Powertrain
- Engine: 4.0 L Barra 270T I6; 4.0 L Barra 310T I6
- Transmission: 6-speed (Borg-Warner T56) manual 6-speed (Tremec TR6060) manual 6-speed (ZF 6HP26) automatic

The FPV F6 is a full-size sedan and coupé utility by produced Ford Performance Vehicles from 2004 until 2014.

== Models ==
The FPV F6 was introduced in 2004, based on the Ford Falcon BA MkII sedan and utility. In the BA and BF series the F6 sedan and utility were called the Typhoon and Tornado respectively. The Typhoon and Tornado names were dropped with the FG series.

FPV also developed the Force 6 as a luxury orientated version of the F6, and a Territory-based F6-X.

=== BA Series ===
BA MKII (2004–2005)

The FPV F6 was launched in 2004 as part of FPV's BA Mk II series. It was powered by the 4.0-litre turbocharged inline-six (I6) Ford Barra engine called 'Barra 270T', producing 270 kW (362 hp) at 5250 rpm and 550 N⋅m (406 lbf⋅ft) of torque at 2000-4000 rpm. It was only offered with a 6-speed Tremec T-56 manual gearbox, bonnet scoop, 18-inch (460 mm) alloy wheels, no stripes on the body, PBR 325 mm (12.8 in)/2-piston brakes, and optional Brembo brakes. The sedan and utility were called the Typhoon and Tornado respectively.

=== BF Series ===
BF MKI (2005–2006)

The FPV BF F6 was launched in 2005, with the 'Barra 270T' engine at 270 kW (362 hp) and 550 N⋅m (406 lbf⋅ft). A ZF 6HP26 6-speed automatic gearbox, as well as 19-inch (480 mm) wheels.

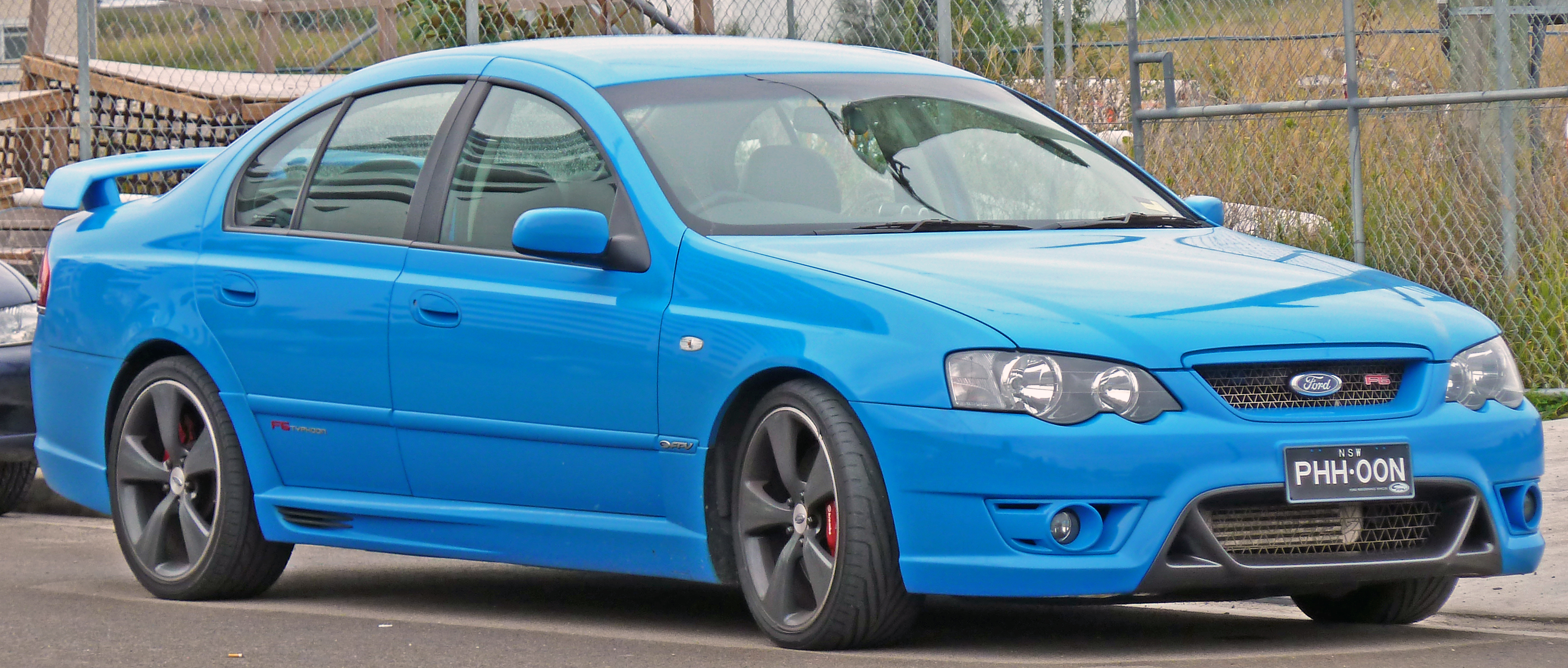
2005–2006 FPV F6 Typhoon (BF)

BF MkII (2006–2008)

The BF MkII F6 was introduced in late-2006, adding 19 in (483 mm) wheels. In 2007 the limited run "R Spec" Typhoon was released, 300 units were produced.

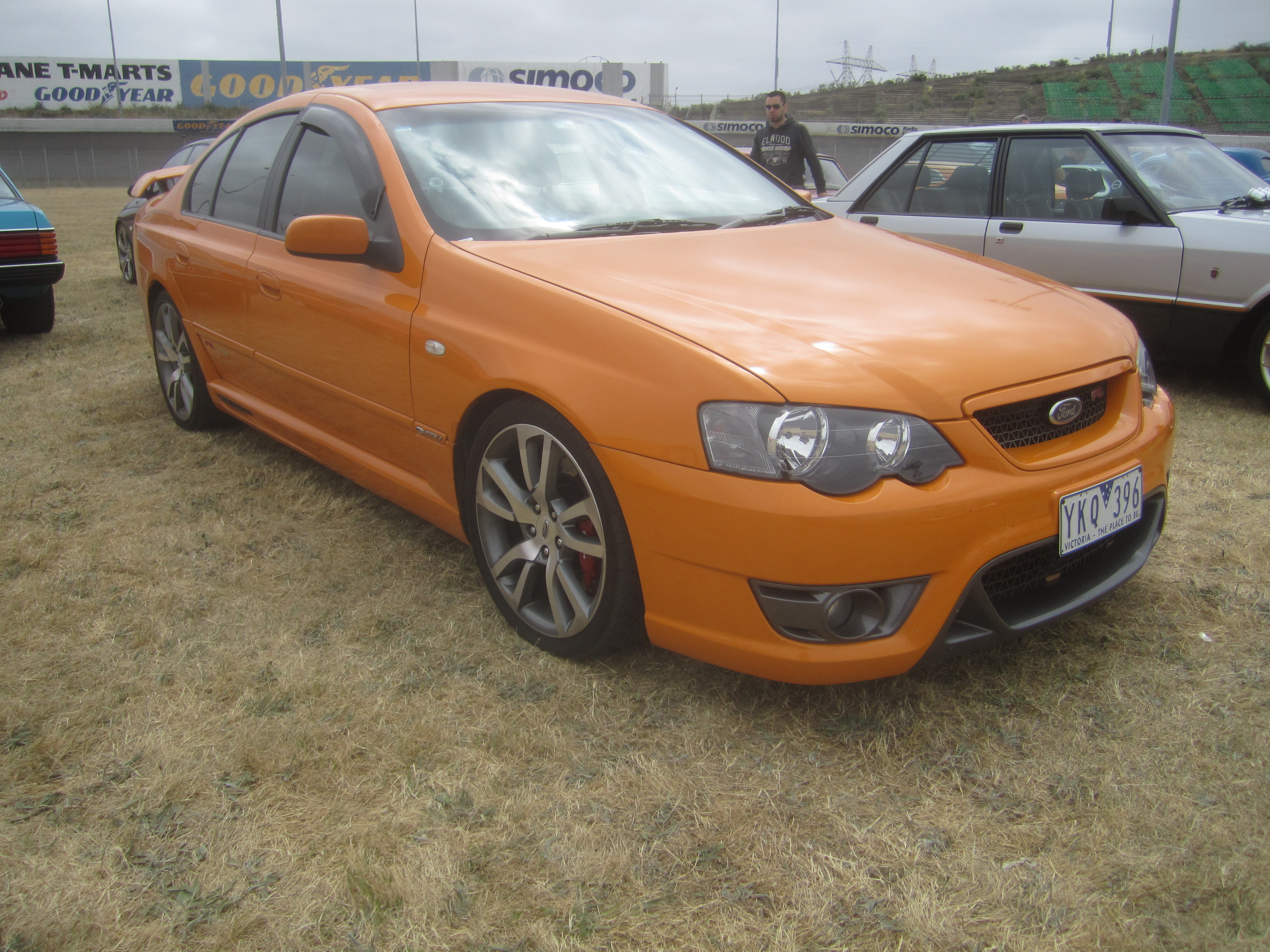
FPV F6 Typhoon R Spec (BF MkII)

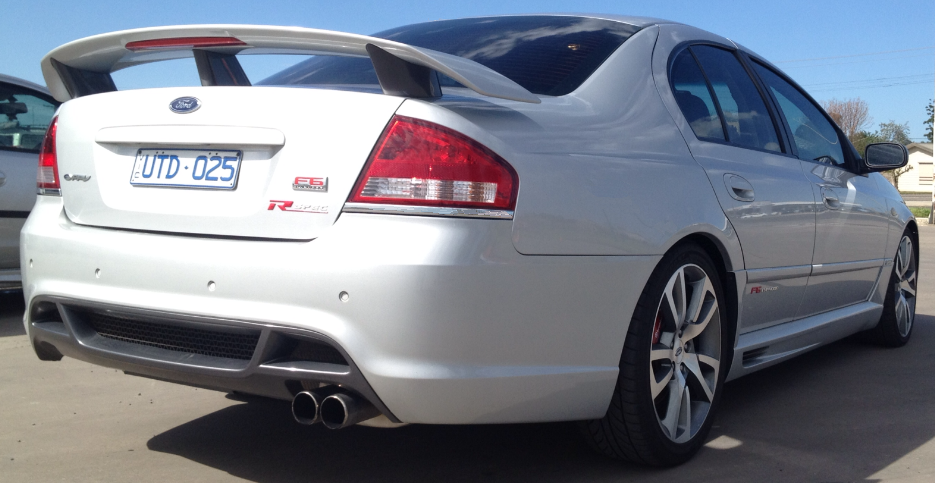
FPV F6 Typhoon R Spec (BF MkII)

=== FG Series ===
FG MKI (2008–2011)

The FG F6 was introduced in 2008, with a 'Barra 310T' I6 at 310 kW (416 hp) and 565 N⋅m (417 lb⋅ft) of torque. It used the Tremec TR-6060 manual gearbox. The "Typhoon" and "Tornado" nameplates were dropped in the FG series.

The F6 E was introduced in 2009, as an executive variant of the F6. Brembo brakes came standard, it otherwise mechanically unchanged from the F6. It came with wood grain dash, a reversing camera and leather seats.

FG MKII (2011–2014)

The FPV FG MkII F6 was introduced in 2011. It revised the front fascia and grille and fascia, with an integrated reversing camera via an eight-inch touch screen. The F6 was discontinued in 2014.

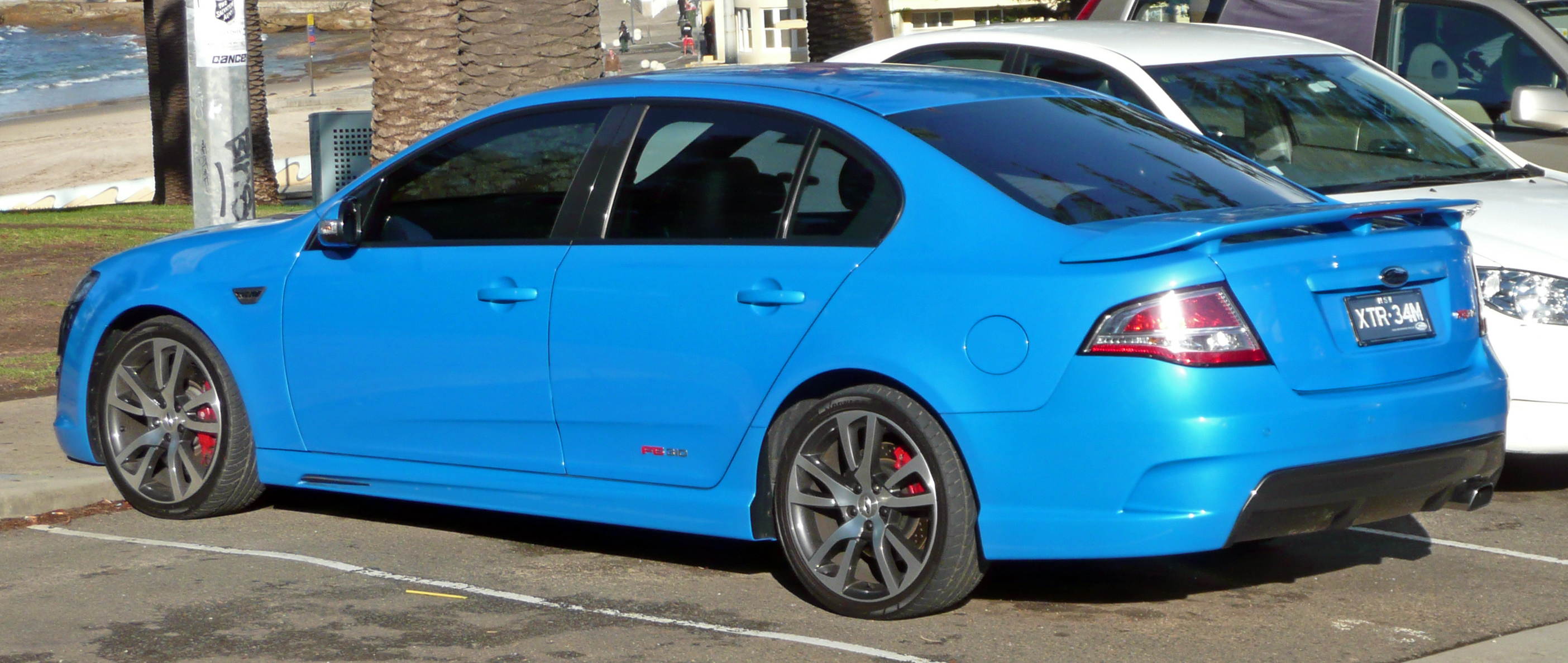
2008–2010 FPV F6 (FG) Sedan

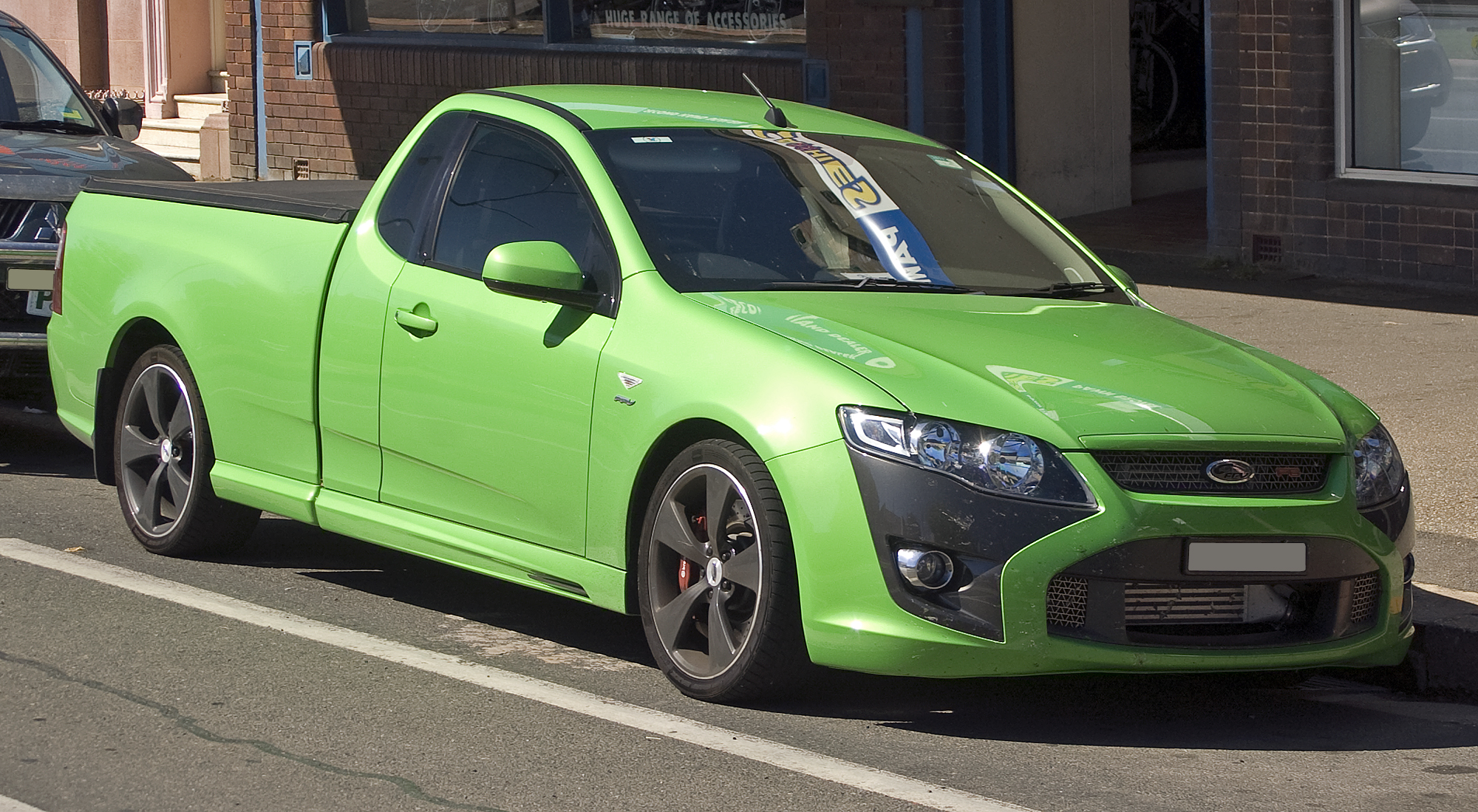
2008–2010 FPV F6 (FG) Ute

== Recall ==
In 2005 the FPV F6 Typhoon was recalled due to clutch failures. The problem was noticed by Motor Magazine during testing, but it was initially dismissed by Ford Performance Vehicles as driver abuse.
