= FPV Pursuit =

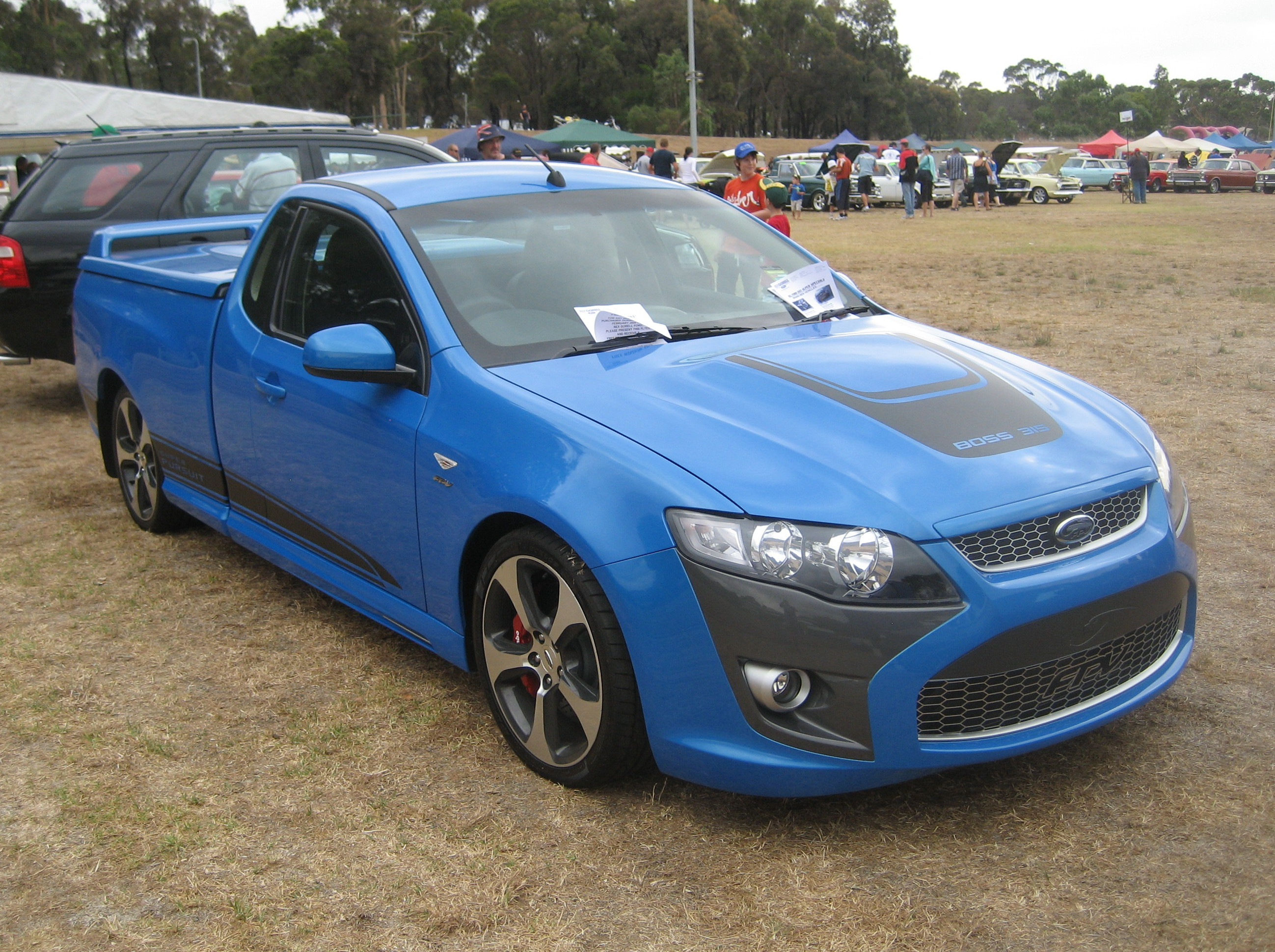
- FPV Super Pursuit (FG)

Overview
- Manufacturer: Ford Performance Vehicles
- Production: 2003–2014

Body and chassis
- Class: Full-size car
- Body style: 2-door coupé utility
- Related: Ford Falcon; FPV F6; FPV GS; FPV GT

Powertrain
- Engine: 5.4 L Boss 290 V8; 5.4 L Boss 302 V8; 5.4 L Boss 315 V8

The FPV Pursuit is a coupé utility produced by Ford Performance Vehicles from 2003 to 2010, with limited numbers being produced in 2012.

== Models ==
=== BA Series ===
The FPV BA Pursuit was introduced in 2003, with a Boss 290 producing 290 kW (389 hp) at 5500 rpm and 520 N⋅m (384 lb⋅ft) of torque at 4500 rpm. It had a leaf spring live axle suspension, the front brakes had twin-piston brake calipers and 325mm rotors, and the back had single-piston calipers and 303mm discs. The Super Pursuit released in June 2005, as a luxury variant of the Pursuit.

=== BF Series ===
The FPV BF Pursuit was released in 2005. It had a six-speed Tremec T-56 manual gearbox, six-speed ZF 6HP 26 automatic gearbox, and 19 inch alloy wheels, and six-piston front callipers by Brembo.

=== FG Series ===
The FPV FG Pursuit was released in 2008, powered by a Boss 315 V8 producing 315 kW (422 hp) at 6500 rpm and 551 N⋅m (406 lb⋅ft) of torque at 4750 rpm. It had four-piston front calipers, and single-piston rear calipers.

The FPV Pursuit nameplate was discontinued in 2010, being brought back as a limited-production model in 2012.
