= 2005 Australian Performance Car Championship =

Seasons
- ← 2004 2006 →

The 2005 Australian Performance Car Championship was an Australian motor sport competition for Performance Cars. It was sanctioned by the Confederation of Australian Motor Sport as a National Championship with GT Performance Racing Pty Ltd. appointed as the Category Manager. It was the first time that the Australian Performance Car Championship name had been used, although similar titles had been run in the two previous years as the Australian GT Performance Car Championship.

Peter Floyd won the championship by 39 points driving a HSV GTS. Garry Holt finished second with 2003 Australian GT Performance Car champion Mark King third.

== Calendar ==
The championship was contested over a seven round series with three races per round.

Round	Circuit	State / Territory	Date	Winning driver	Car
1	Adelaide Parklands Circuit	South Australia	17–20 March	Chris Alajajian	Subaru Impreza WRX STi
2	Wakefield Park Raceway	New South Wales	13–15 May	Mark King	Mitsubishi Lancer Evo VIII
3	Eastern Creek International Raceway	New South Wales	27–29 May	Peter Floyd	HSV VYII GTS 300
4	Hidden Valley Raceway	Northern Territory	1–3 July	Garry Holt	Mitsubishi Lancer Evo VIII
5	Oran Park Motorsport Circuit	New South Wales	12–14 August	Ric Shaw	Mazda RX-7
6	Symmons Plains International Raceway	Tasmania	11–13 November	Steve Cramp	HSV GTS
7	Phillip Island Grand Prix Circuit	Victoria	25–27 November	Beric Lynton	BMW M3 E46

== Points system ==
Points were awarded on a 30-24-20-18-17-16-15-14-13-12-11-10-9-8-7-6-5-4-3-2-1 basis to the first 21 classified finishers in each race. An additional 3 points were awarded to the driver setting the fastest qualifying time at each round.

== Results ==
Position	Driver	No.	Car	Entrant	Points
1	Peter Floyd	98	HSV VYII GTS 300 kW	www.Kawasaki-fp.com / BP Ultimate	445
2	Garry Holt	21	Mitsubishi Lancer Evo VIII	Eastern Creek International Raceway	406
3	Mark King	34	Mitsubishi Lancer Evo VIII	King Springs / Delphi	362
4	Beric Lynton	23	BMW M3 E46	Bruce Lynton BMW	321
5	Barry Morcom	11	Mitsubishi Lancer Evo VIII	Rondo Building Services	288
6	Steve Cramp	19	HSV VX GTS; HSV VZ GTS	CVW Engineering	282
7	John Falk	87	FPV BA MkII GT	Fibreglass International	243
8	Barrie Nesbitt	5	HSV VY GTS; HSV Coupe GTO	Donut King	226
9	James Philip	3	FPV BA MkII GT	First Auto Parts Plus	192
10	Peter Boylan	7	BMW M3 E46	Aussie Hire / DBA	188
11	Chris Alajajian	22	Subaru Impreza WRX STi	Jack Hillermans Smash / Bilstein	188
12	Michael Brock	88	Mitsubishi Lancer Evo VIII	Coopers Pale Ale	181
13	Gary Young	4	Mitsubishi Lancer Evo VIII	Readymix	169
14	Ric Shaw	35	Mazda RX-7	Ric Shaw Performance / Sennheise	123
15	Dean Lillie	18 & 15	HSV VY GTS	Wake-Up! Backpacker Hotel	122
16	Anthony Alford	12	Nissan 200SX; HSV Coupe GTO	Donut King	116
17	Graham Alexander	57	Mitsubishi Lancer Evo VII	Corio Auto Parts	116
18	Barry Sternbeck	69	HSV VY GTS 300 kW	Hanson / AVJennings	98
19	Lynne Champion	8	Mitsubishi Lancer Evo VIII	Steve Knight	96
20	Mike Fitzgerald	42	Nissan 350Z	Aussie Hire	86
21	Bruce Williams	16	Subaru Impreza WRX STi	Bruce Williams Motorsport	74
22	Trevor Haines	17	FPV BA MkII GT	Team GT	70
23	Anton Mechtler	9	Mitsubishi Lancer Evo VII	Mek-Tek Motorsport	60
24	Rod Dawson	87	FPV BA MkII GT	Fibreglass International	44
25	Trevor Sheumack	300	HSV GTS	www.Kawasaki-fp.com / BP Ultimate	43
26	Geoff Morgan	41	BMW M3 E46	Aussie Hire / DBA / Somersets	43
27	Adam Beechey	13	Nissan 200SX GT	Donut King	38
28	Peter Leehmuis	14	Nissan 200SX; HSV VY GTS	Donut King Racing	34
29	Craig Dontas	45	HSV VX GTS 300 kW	CSA Alloy Wheels/Straightline	28
30	Mark Cohen	44	HSV VY GTS	MGC Racing	22
31	Stephen Hoinville	60	FPV BA F6 Typhoon	Robinson Racing / Snickers	21
32	Andrew Taplin	6	Mitsubishi Lancer Evo	Andrew Taplin	19
33	John McIlroy	60	FPV BA F6 Typhoon	Ford Dealers	16
34	John Woodberry	57	Mitsubishi Lancer Evo VII	Corio Auto Parts	10
35	Dennis Cribbin	41	BMW M3 E46	Aussie Hire / DBA	9
36	Brett Youlden	60	FPV BA F6 Typhoon		7
37	Warren Millett	18	HSV VX GTS 300 kW	Wake-Up Backpacker Hotel	2

Note: Race 1 of Round 7 at Phillip island was stopped following a first lap collision between championship leader Peter Floyd and his teammate Trevor Sheumack. No points were awarded for this race and the points awarded for Race 2 and Race 3 were adjusted to compensate.
