= 2007 Australian Performance Car Championship =

Seasons
- ← 2006 2008 →

The 2007 Australian Performance Car Championship was a CAMS sanctioned national motor racing championship, organised by GT Performance Racing Pty Ltd. It was the third championship to be contested under the Australian Performance Car Championship name, with similar titles having been contested in both 2003 and 2004 as the Australian GT Performance Car Championship. The 2007 championship was won by Gary Young, driving a Mitsubishi Lancer EVO VIII RS.

== Calendar ==
The championship was contested over a six round series. Each round was held over three races.

Round	Circuit	State	Date	Round winner	Car
1	Winton	Victoria	18–20 May	Mark King	Mitsubishi Lancer EVO VIII RS
2	Eastern Creek	New South Wales	9–10 June	Gary Young	Mitsubishi Lancer EVO VIII RS
3	Hidden Valley	Northern Territory	22–24 June	Barrie Nesbitt	HSV VY GTS Coupe
4	Oran Park	New South Wales	17–19 August	Gary Young	Mitsubishi Lancer EVO VIII RS
5	Bathurst	New South Wales	4–7 October	Peter Floyd	HSV VYII GTS
6	Symmons Plains	Tasmania	16–18 November	Gary Young	Mitsubishi Lancer EVO VIII RS

Note: The proposed opening round at Wakefield Park was conducted as a non-championship event.

Note: The Hidden Valley and Symmons Plains rounds carried double championship points.

== Results ==
Position	Driver	No.	Car	Entrant	Points
1	Gary Young	8	Mitsubishi Lancer EVO VIII RS	Salta Constructions / Westgate	380
2	Mark King	34	Mitsubishi Lancer EVO VIII RS	King Springworks	366
3	Peter Floyd	98	HSV VYII GTS	Samsung Communications Centre	340
4	Graham Alexander	57	Mitsubishi Lancer EVO VIII RS	Corio Auto Parts	335
5	Barrie Nesbitt	5	HSV VY GTS Coupe	Donut King	318
6	Tim Poulton	16	Lotus Exige	Simply Sports Cars	267
7	Tony Alford	12	HSV VY GTS Coupe	Donut King	264
8	Tony Loscialpo	37	HSV VYII GTS	Tempest Air & Mechanical	224
9	Jim Pollicina	4	HSV VYII GTS	Excelerate Motorsport	224
10	Mark O'Connor	10	Lotus Exige	Xracecam	191
11	James Phillip	3	FPV BF GT; FPV BF F6 Typhoon	First Auto Parts Plus	183
12	Peter Leemhuis	28	Nissan 200SX GT	Donut King	114
13	Sam Walter	47	HSV VYII GTS	Melbourne Performance Centre	104
14	Beric Lynton	23	BMW M3 E46	Donut King	93
15	Brian Smallwood	26	Subaru Impreza WRX STi	Wilson Bros Racing	88
16	Mike Hannon	89	HSV VYII GTS	www.1300kawasaki.com	74
17	Richard Buttrose	13	Lotus Exige	Balmain Commercial Property Finance	72
18	Peter Boylan	7	BMW M3 E46	STS Turbo	61
19	Renato Loberto	25	Subaru Impreza WRX STi	Wilson Bros Racing	53
20	Gary MacDonald	15	HSV VYII GTS	Interior Logistics	52
21	Steve Cramp	19	HSV VYII GTS	Manta Racing Services	48
22	Andre Morris	6	Lotus Exige	Witches Chase Cheese Co	43
23	Paul Freestone	20	HSV VYII GTS	Donut King	31
24	Martin Miller	55	HSV VT Clubsport R8	Martin Miller	31
25	John Pagonas	77	Lotus Exige		30
26	Luke Searle	30	BMW 130i	SAE College	27
27	Andrew Fisher	99	Lotus Exige	Bryden Compensation Lawyers	26
28	Paul Ryan	22	Lotus Exige	Choice Petroleum	26
29	Bob Brewer	60	HSV VY Clubsport R8	Professional Traffic Solutions	21
30	Drew Russell	27	Mazda RX-7 Series 8 RS	Go Karts Go Australia	20
31	Rob Thomson	68	Lotus Exige	QueenslandHoseandLand.com	17
32	Denis Cribbin	66	BMW M3 E46	Cribbin Blencowe Real Estate	15
33	Bob Pearson	33	Mitsubishi Lancer EVO VIII RS	Pro - Duct Motorsport	14
34	Stephen Kent	2	HSV VX Clubsport R8	Metalair Pty Ltd	6

=== Privateers Cup ===
Position	Driver	No.	Car	Entrant	Points
1	Jim Pollicina	4	HSV VYII GTS	Excelerate Motorsport	448
2	Tony Loscialpo	37	HSV VYII GTS	Tempest Air & Mechanical	440
3	Peter Leemhuis	28	Nissan 200SX GT	Donut King	289
4	Martin Miller	55	HSV VT Clubsport R8	Martin Miller	93
5	Paul Ryan	22	Lotus Exige	Choice Petroleum	85
6	Bob Brewer	60	HSV VY Clubsport R8	Professional Traffic Solutions	82
7	Rob Thomson	68	Lotus Exige	QueenslandHoseandLand.com	59
8	Drew Russell	27	Mazda RX-7 Series 8 RS	Go Karts Go Australia	57
9	Luke Searle	30	BMW 130i	SAE College	56
10	John Pagonas	77	Lotus Exige		54
11	Denis Cribbin	66	BMW M3 E46	Cribbin Blencowe Real Estate	51
12	Stephen Kent	2	HSV VX Clubsport R8	Metalair Pty Ltd	39

Privateers Cup cars were restricted to grooved Pirelli tyres, whereas Outright Class cars could use slick tyres.
