= 2006 Australian Performance Car Championship =

Seasons
- ← 2005 2007 →

The 2006 Australian Performance Car Championship was a CAMS sanctioned Australian motor racing championship for production-based touring cars. It was the second championship to be contested under the Australian Performance Car Championship name with similar titles having been run in 2003 and 2004 as the Australian GT Performance Car Championship. GT Performance Racing Pty Ltd was appointed by CAMS as the Category Manager for the 2006 championship.

The championship was won by Gary Holt driving a Mitsubishi Lancer RS Evo VIII. It was Holt's first title after racing in various categories of high performance sedans from V8 Supercars to Production Cars since 1999. Beric Lynton was second in a BMW M3 with defending champion Peter Floyd third in a HSV GTS.

== Calendar ==
The championship was contested over a seven round series.

Round	Circuit	State	Date	Format	Round winner	Car
1	Oran Park Raceway	New South Wales	6-7 May	3 races	Barry Morcom	Mitsubishi Lancer RS Evo VIII
2	Wakefield Park Raceway	New South Wales	26-28 May	2 races	Garry Holt	Mitsubishi Lancer RS Evo VIII
3	Eastern Creek International Raceway	New South Wales	8-9 July	3 races	Garry Holt	Mitsubishi Lancer RS Evo VIII
4	Phillip Island Grand Prix Circuit	Victoria	19-20 August	3 races	Peter Floyd	HSV VYII GTS
5	Mallala Motor Sport Park	South Australia	15-17 September	3 races	Graham Alexander	Mitsubishi Lancer RS Evo VIII
6	Symmons Plains International Raceway	Tasmania	10-12 November	3 races	Graham Alexander	Mitsubishi Lancer RS Evo VIII
7	Eastern Creek International Raceway	New South Wales	25-26 November	2 races	Beric Lynton	BMW M3 E46

== Classes ==
Car competed in two classes, Outright and Privateer. The latter class was for non-current model vehicles running on a control tyre.

== Points system ==
Championship points were awarded on the results of each race as per the following table:

Race position	1st	2nd	3rd	4th	5th	6th	7th	8th	9th	10th	11th	12th	13th	14th	15th	16th	17th	18th	19th	20th	21st
Rounds with two races	45	36	30	27	25.5	24	22.5	21	19.5	18	16.5	15	13.5	12	10.5	9	7.5	6	4.5	3	1.5
Rounds with three races	30	24	20	18	17	16	15	14	13	12	11	10	9	8	7	6	5	4	3	2	1

In addition, 3 points were awarded to the driver gaining Pole Position for Race 1 at each round.

The same points score structure was applied for the Privateers Cup award.

== Results ==
Position	Driver	No.	Car	Entrant	Points
1	Garry Holt	21	Mitsubishi Lancer RS Evo VIII	Century 21 Real Estate	447.5
2	Beric Lynton	23	BMW M3 E46	Bruce Lynton BMW/Donut King	425.5
3	Peter Floyd	300 & 98	HSV VYII GTS	www.kawasaki-fp.com	413
4	Barry Morcom	11	Mitsubishi Lancer RS Evo VIII	Rondo Building Services	396.5
5	Dean Lillie	15	HSV VYII GTS	LPGAS 1	342
6	Steve Cramp	19	HSV VYII GTS	Manta Racing Services	308.5
7	Graham Alexander	57	Mitsubishi Lancer RS Evo VIII	Corio Auto Parts	280.5
8	Tony Alford	12	HSV VY GTS Coupe	Donut King	158.5
9	Andrew Moffat	9	FPV BF F6 Typhoon	Australian Motor Finance	156
10	James Philip	3	FPV BF GT	First Auto Parts Plus	130
11	Barrie Nesbitt	5	HSV VY GTS Coupe	Donut King Racing	115
12	Sam Walter	99	HSV VYII GTS	www.kawasaki-fp.com	46
13	Gary Young	8	Mitsubishi Lancer Evo	Salta / Westgate	43.5
14	Adam Beechey	60	Nissan 200SX GT	Beechey's Service Centre	18
15	John Falk	87	FPV BA GT	Fiberglass International	15
Privateer's Cup
Position	Driver	No.	Car	Entrant	Points
1	Drew Russell	27	Mazda RX-7; Honda S2000	Go Karts Go	422
2	Mark Cohen	44	HSV VX GTS	MGC Racing	350.5
3	Jim Pollicina	4	HSV VX GTS	Excellerate Motorsports	145
4	Martin Miller	58	HSV VT GTS	Ferntree Gully Holden	92
5	Steve Knight	3	Mitsubishi Lancer RS Evo VI	Steve Knight	90
6	Chris Alajajian	2	Subaru Liberty GT	Jack Hillermans/Elf Oil	61.5
