= Callaway Cars =

American specialty vehicle manufacturer

Callaway Cars Inc.
- Type: Private
- Industry: Specialty vehicle and automotive products manufacturer
- Founded: 1977
- Founder: Reeves Callaway
- Headquarters: Old Lyme, Connecticut, United States
- Key people: Reeves Callaway, Founder Peter Callaway, General Manager Michael Zoner, Managing Director Patrick Hodgins, Chief Engineer Scott Rawling, Engineering Group Manager
- Owner: Reeves Callaway
- Website: www.callawaycars.com

Callaway Cars Inc. is an American specialty vehicle manufacturer and engineering company that designs, develops, and manufactures high-performance product packages for cars, pickup trucks, and SUVs. They specialize in Corvettes and other General Motors (GM) vehicles. New GM vehicles are delivered to Callaway facilities where special packages and components are installed. Then the vehicles are delivered to GM new car dealers where they are sold to retail customers, branded as Callaway. Callaway Cars is one of four core Callaway companies, including Callaway Engineering, Callaway Carbon and Callaway Competition.

== History ==
In 1973 Reeves Callaway (full name Ely Reeves Callaway III), son of Callaway Golf founder Ely Callaway Jr., was not in a financial position to start the racing career he was aspiring to. Instead, he went to work as a driving instructor at Bob Bondurant's racing school. While using the newly launched BMW 320i as a school car, he became familiar with its intricacies and deficiencies, and later convinced BMW to let him take one of its cars to his garage in Old Lyme, Connecticut, to tune it for more power.

As a result, Callaway constructed and installed his first prototype turbocharger system and offered Car and Driver journalist Don Sherman the opportunity to drive the car resulting in a one-page article, giving the modified car great acclaim. Realizing its commercial potential, he told Sherman that he could make turbocharger kits available to the BMW community despite not having the necessary equipment to manufacture the components, including a drill press. In 1977, he founded Callaway Cars, Inc.

Over the years, Callaway developed turbocharger kits for BMW, Volkswagen, Porsche, Audi and Mercedes-Benz. He also developed the HH IndyCar V8 engine and later produced twin turbo conversions of the Alfa Romeo GTV6 for Alfa Romeo USA—35 Twin Turbo GTV6 were produced, most of which still exist in 2023. This attracted the attention of GM engineering, which led Callaway to become famous in 1987 when they adapted the twin turbo conversion for the Corvette. Built under Regular Production Option (RPO) B2K, the Callaway Twin Turbo Corvette was available through Chevrolet dealers as a factory option. Callaway sold 510 of them over a period of five years.

Callaway was also commissioned by Aston Martin to design new cylinder heads for the Aston Martin Virage 5.3 L V8 engine, which led to him managing the engine program for its AMR1 Group C racer.

Callaway Cars headquarters is in Old Lyme, Connecticut with West Coast facilities in Temecula, California, and European facilities in Leingarten, Germany. Its current projects are the Corvette Z06-based Callaway Corvette SC757, Stingray-based Callaway Corvette SC627, Callaway Tahoe/Suburban, Yukon/Yukon XL and Escalade/Escalade ESV SC480 and SC560, Callaway Camaro SC630 and SC750, and Cadillac-based Callaway CTS-V SC740.

Reeves Callaway died on July 11, 2023, at the age of 75.

== Projects ==
Callaway tend to refer to each project with a C, followed by a project number.

=== C1 (Callaway Turbo Systems) ===
The Callaway Turbo Systems was the name of the development program and subsequent sale of the developed product, aftermarket turbocharger systems for BMW, VW, Porsche, Audi and Mercedes-Benz. The Callaway C1 VW turbo kit was contracted to Drake Engineering for the design. In exchange for the design, Drake Engineering concurrently sold the kit under their own name for the first two years of production; thereafter, Callaway retained exclusive rights. This was the first of the Callaway's projects, running from its company's foundation in 1977 to 1984.

=== C2 (Callaway HH Indy Car Engine) ===
The Callaway HH Indy Car Engine was a project to build a racing engine for IndyCar specifications from semi-scratch as an eleven-months-long program between 1980 and 1981. It was intended to show Callaway's capability to design and implement a complex high-performance engine program. The "HH" design engineer was a famed BMW and now freelance engine designer, Hans Hermann. The HH Indy Car engine V8 block was designed to fit two Hermann-designed, Drake Engineering water-cooled Volkswagen 16-valve cylinder heads.

=== C3 (Alfa Romeo Callaway Twin Turbo GTV-6) ===
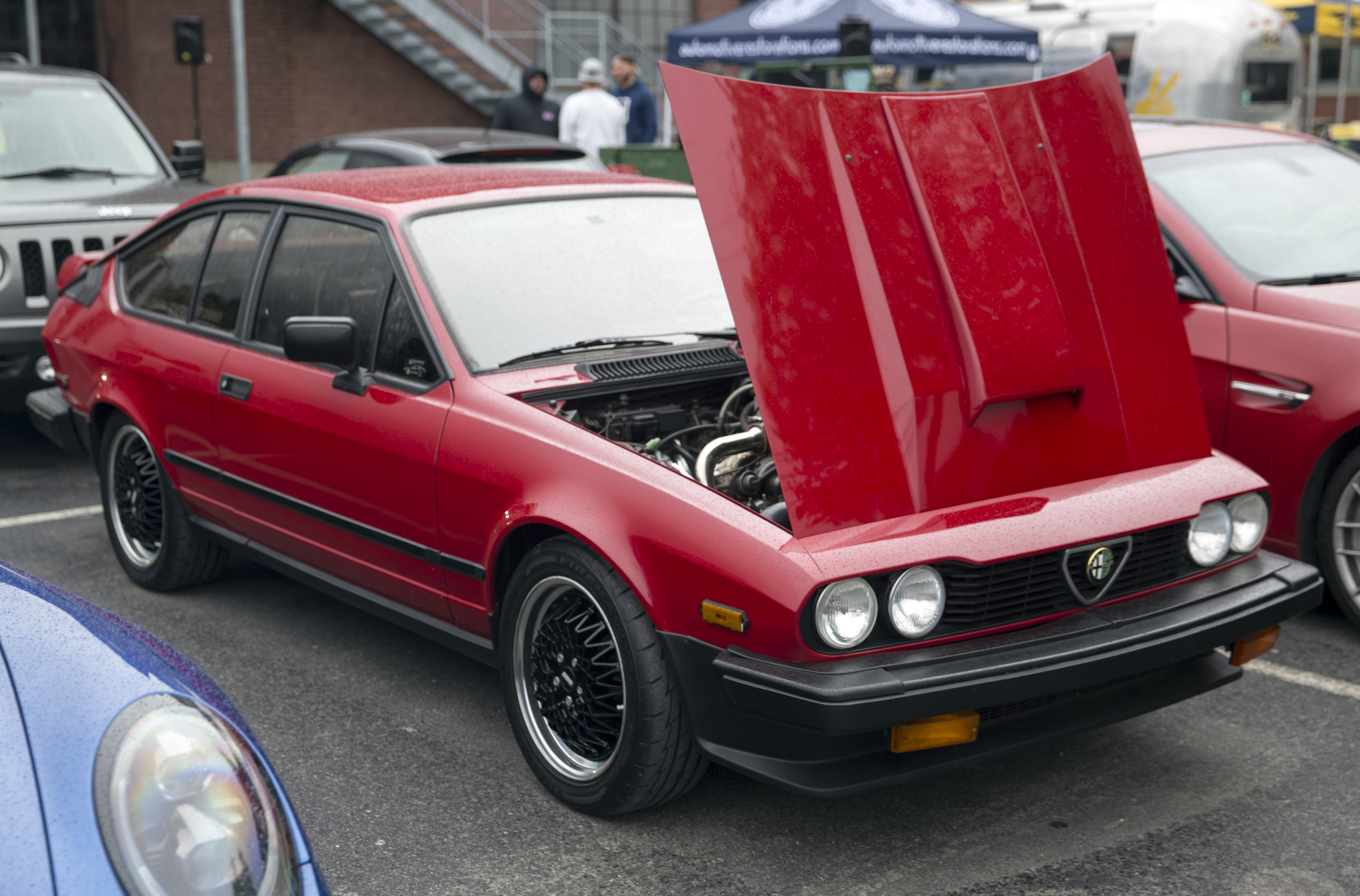
Alfa Romeo GTV6 Callaway Twin Turbo

Callaway's success with turbocharger kits led to a commission from Alfa Romeo to produce a higher end version of its 2.5-liter GTV-6 coupé. Between thirty and thirty-six examples were built between 1983 and 1986, with the first prototype being sold and titled as a 1984 model, the subsequent four prototypes as 1985 models and the remainder (i.e. the "regular production") being sold as 1986 model year cars. In addition to numerous small component upgrades, the Callaway GTVs included a much revised suspension, improved brakes and a twin-turbocharger system, boosting performance to near-exotic levels. The C3 received a rear spoiler and a different hood with a large scoop.

The car's performance caught the attention of Dave McLellan, Chief Engineer of the Corvette, which would subsequently lead to the Callaway-Corvette association it would become famous for.

=== C4 (RPO B2K Callaway Twin Turbo Corvette) ===
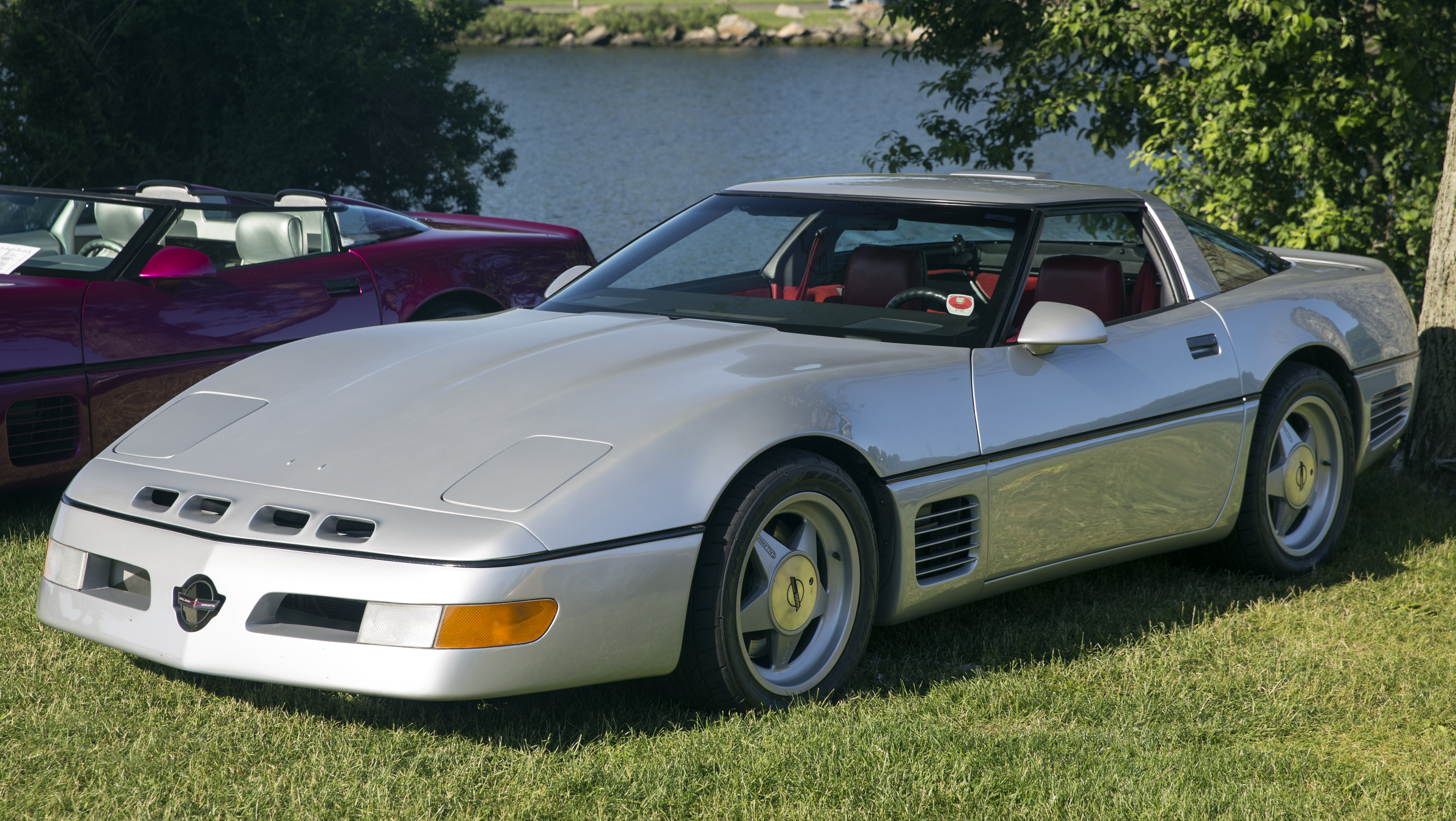
Callaway Twin Turbo Corvette with the Aerobody, based on the Corvette C4.

The special edition Callaway Twin Turbo Corvette was available from 1987 to 1991 as Regular Production Option (RPO) B2K and could be ordered from select dealers in the US. Corvette orders with the B2K option selected were shipped to Callaway Cars in Old Lyme, Connecticut, for the Twin Turbo conversion directly from the Bowling Green assembly plant.

Once converted and tested, the Callaway Corvettes were then shipped to their ordering dealers for final delivery to their respective owners. Dealer repairs of the Callaway Twin Turbo Corvettes were covered by the standard GM 12-month/12,000 mile warranty, with Callaway Cars, Inc. reimbursing dealers for time and materials on repairs to the added components. This was the only time GM allowed a factory-orderable non-GM performance enhancement on the Corvette.

The ultimate Callaway Twin Turbo Corvette is known as the Sledgehammer Corvette. Until 1999, the Callaway Sledgehammer Corvette held the World Street Legal speed record of 254.76 mph (410.00 km/h). It is an emissions-compliant, street-legal vehicle with all the creature comforts, like air conditioning, radio, etc. that a customer would find in any production street Corvette. Built using production chassis 1988–051, it achieved its World Record Title in November 1988 at the Ohio Transportation Research Center (TRC). In addition to Callaway's engine performance improvements, the Sledgehammer Corvette used modified body panels to reduce drag and improve stability. This body modification, known as the Callaway AeroBody, was designed by Automotive Designer Paul Deutschman. The Callaway AeroBody was later available as an appearance enhancement option for Callaway Corvettes beginning in the 1989 model year.

On the performance side, the 1987 production version of the Callaway Twin Turbo B2K option provided 345 hp (257 kW) and 465 lb⋅ft (630 N⋅m) of torque, with a top speed of 178 mph (286 km/h), at a price of just over $50K. In those days, this brought the Callaway Corvette into the performance category of Ferrari and Lamborghini, which cost in the range of $100–$175K. According to National Corvette Museum records, 188 Corvettes were built that model year, with the Callaway Twin Turbo (B2K) option on 167 cars.

As a footnote to 1987 production, one 1986 Callaway Twin Turbo Corvette was built at the very start of production. This sole 1986 Callaway Corvette, was built using one of the fifty Malcolm Konner Commemorative Edition Corvette Coupes (RPO Code 4001ZA) built that year and counted under 1986 Callaway Corvette production.

For 1988, Callaway increased the stock performance of the Twin Turbo Corvette to yield 382 hp (285 kW) and 562 lb⋅ft (762 N⋅m) of torque. That year, 125 Callaway Twin Turbo Corvettes were built, with 105 ordered with the RPO B2K option.

The 1989 Callaway Twin Turbo option provided the same power output as the 1988. However, after the World Record run of the Callaway Sledgehammer, the AeroBody became an option for the Callaway Twin Turbo Corvette. A total of 51 (B2K) Callaway Twin Turbo Corvettes were ordered that year with a total of 68 cars produced.

In 1990, GM finally introduced their ZR-1 Corvette, which obtained similar performance characteristics as the 1989 Callaway Twin-Turbo option. Although power was up to 390 hp (291 kW) and 562 lb⋅ft (762 N⋅m) of torque, 1990 saw the lowest number of (B2K) Callaway Twin Turbo Corvettes ordered: 59 were ordered, with only 58 actually built.

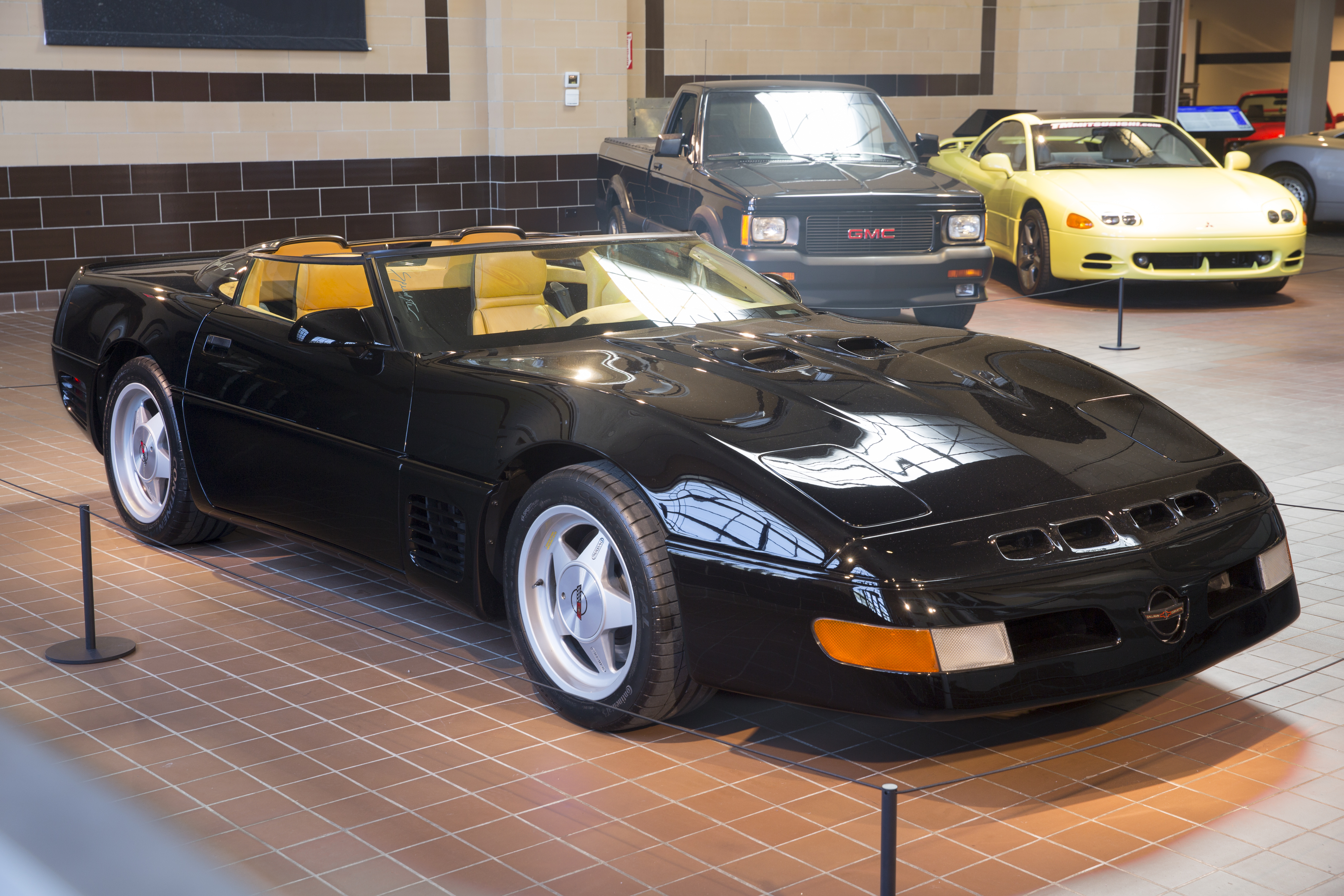
1991 Callaway Corvette Twin Turbo Speedster

To counter the ZR-1, for the 1991 model year, Callaway was able to bring up the output of the B2K option up to 402 hp (300 kW) and 582 lb⋅ft (789 N⋅m) of torque. 1991 would be the last year of the L98 engine, which was the base engine of the Callaway Twin Turbo Corvette. There were 62 ordered in this last year of Twin Turbo production. In total, 497 (B2K) Callaway Twin Turbo Corvettes were ordered through the normal sales channels. However, before the Callaway Twin Turbo option went away, Callaway and Deutschman went to work to provide yet another more powerful and stunning car, the Callaway Speedster. A small amount of the final twin turbo cars and the Speedsters—including 10 Series 1 Speedsters with the L98 Twin Turbo—were designated 500 Series Callaway Twin Turbo Corvettes. These unique cars came with OZ Racing wheels and Bridgestone Potenza tires, a "500 Series" dash plaque, a "500 Series" intercooler badge, a special car bra, a car cover, and floor mats.

Regarding the "production" of the Callaway Sledgehammer, Reeves Callaway built it using a production Callaway Twin Turbo Corvette (chassis 1988–051). The car was, in fact, a production car, with all options found in other Corvettes of the same model year.

=== C5 (Aston Martin Virage V8 and AMR-1 Group C Engine) ===
Aston Martin retained Callaway to help it re-engineer its then 30-year-old Tadek Marek-designed, two-valve V8 engine for the upcoming Aston Martin Virage. Callaway's brief was for four-valve cylinder heads, increased power, and single-configuration worldwide emissions compliance. The Virage road car debuted in 1989 and the project was successful enough that Aston chose to rely on Callaway to supply a race version of the road car engine for their 1989 Group C prototype, the AMR-1. It finished eleventh in its first and only appearance at Le Mans.

=== C7 (Callaway C7) ===
The C7 is an ill-fated supercar built for GT1 category racing, developed between 1993 and 1996. Callaway attempted but failed to pre-qualify the C7 at the 1996 24 Hours of Le Mans. It was subsequently entered into the Daytona Rolex 24 Hour race, where it held the lead at the 12‑hour point. However, an electrical failure, which led to an oil system failure, prevented it from finishing its first real long-distance test.

=== C8 (SuperNatural Camaro) ===
Approximately 55 SuperNatural Camaros were created and approximately 18 Callaway C8s. In order to be an official C8, the engine and bodykit had to be installed. Brembo brakes, various suspensions, and an upgraded interior were all available options. The first SuperNatural Camaro is a 1993 Indy pace car replica (one of the 633 wearing the same decals and such as the two actual cars that paced the race). The first production (and completed) C8 is a red 1994 convertible. The silver prototype used in many advertisements and marketing materials is not considered a production C8, but may be considered one of those 18.

For 2002, Callaway produced a limited run of Commemorative C8s, based on the 1998–2002 Camaro. Although only two were produced to this specification, one 1996 Callaway C8 was upgraded to the Commemorative body kit by the company. Although this brings the total number of C8s with this kit to three, Callaway only recognises the two originally built. Only the silver Commemorative C8 is a 2002 model; the other is Cayenne Red metallic and is a 1998. The most noticeable difference between a Callaway C8 and a Commemorative C8 is the different nose.

=== C9 (Callaway Impala SS) ===
The Callaway SS integrated the 400 bhp, 383 cid SuperNatural engine used in Callaway Corvettes and Camaros with the Chevrolet Impala SS. The Callaway SS also included suspension, braking, wheel and tire enhancements.

=== C10 (Limited Edition Corvette Ski Boat) ===
The Callaway-designed and built 383 cid engine was based on the Chevrolet Vortec V8, which in final tune produced 400 bhp at 5,250 rpm and 437 lb-ft at 4,000 rpm. It was then claimed as the fastest production ski boat in the world, with production runs limited to only 125 per year.

=== C11 (Limited Edition Range Rover 4.6 HSE) ===
The top-of-the-line model in 1999 was a limited edition Range Rover 4.6 HSE modified by Callaway in Old Lyme, Connecticut. A total of 220 were made and each one was numbered with "Callaway" stickers on the dash. They were available in Niagra Gray, Epsom Green, or Rutland Red. They had much of the black plastic painted body color and a special dual exhaust system. The high performance Callaway engine with 240 bhp (180 kW) at 5,000 rpm and peak torque of 285 ft⋅lbf (386 N⋅m) at 3,500 rpm improved the 4.6 HSE acceleration 0-60 mph from 9.7 seconds to 8.6 seconds. The Callaway 4.6 HSE sold for $75,000.

The "short block" of the engine is the same as other Land Rover 4.6 HSE models. Short blocks used for the 4.6L Callaway engines were stamped with a 9.60:1 compression ratio marking from Land Rover. The increase of 0.25 points, up from the standard 4.6L compression ratio of 9.35:1 was achieved by a modification to the cylinder heads. The cylinder heads were also modified to improve the airflow into and out of the combustion chambers. The inlet manifold gasket front valley clamp was changed to accommodate the heater hose positioning on the bottom front of the Callaway manifold. The ram pipe housing was modified by shortening the ram pipe tube lengths. The intake runner lengths were tuned to increase both power and torque. The black plastic air inlet tube was replaced with a larger diameter fancy looking carbon fiber inlet tube to match the larger throttle bore in the plenum. The air cleaner box base was modified to increase the airflow. The Lucas GEMS ECU was calibrated to support the mechanical changes to the Callaway engine (the Callaway engine had the same basic FI as in 1998 and did not have the Bosch system that was on other 1999 HSEs).

The Callaway drivetrain was also modified. The automatic transmission used in the Callaway 4.6 HSE Range has a different torque converter and the transmission control unit (TCU) was recalibrated to take advantage of the increased torque and power of the engine. The shift points in both "normal" and "sport" modes were changed to match the engine's increased power.

The electronic shift transfer case has a new ratio sprocket set and chain. The resulting new ratios provide a high range ratio of 1.294:1 and a low range ratio of 3.481:1. The ratio change improves acceleration performance in the high range while also providing improved off-road crawl performance and coast-down rates in the low range.

The front axle shafts used on the Callaway 4.6 HSE were strengthened to withstand the increased torque applied to the front wheels from the engine and transmission changes. A material change in the axles ensures durability will be maintained for the front axle half shafts.

Callaway decided to use a four-pin front differential to accommodate the increased torque rather than the two-pin front differential used on standard production Range Rovers. After working with Callaway on the four-pin front differential, Land Rover decided to put them in all of the 1999 Range Rovers since the 4-wheel traction control that added ABS-regulated traction control to the front axle in 1999 also put extra stress on the front differential (Range Rovers from 1993 to 1998 only had traction control on the rear axle).

The Callaway dual exhaust had reduced backpressure and was similar to the dual exhaust that all NAS Range Rovers received in the 2000 model year. Changes to the exhaust system were made rearward of the catalyst "Y" pipe. The exhaust system backpressure was reduced by 43 percent, and the interior sound level in the passenger cabin was virtually unchanged. The center silencer provides reduced backpressure and is constructed from stainless steel. A twin tail pipe system was selected to provide a performance look and sound. The straight exit twin outlets are accented by T-304 stainless steel resonator tips to visually differentiate the Callaway 4.6 HSE from other Range Rovers. The pipes are welded onto the stock mufflers, and the rear bumper has cutouts for the tailpipes like it had in 1995 and 1996 (the stock single muffler pointed down, and the rear bumper did not have any cutout on the 1997, 1998 and non-Callaway 1999 Range Rovers). The exterior of the Callaway 4.6 HSE Range Rover had painted body color components. The exterior components painted to match the body color are the entire front bumper cover, the front grill, left and right headlamp trim, left and right door mirror casings, and rear bumper including area with exhaust tip openings.

All Callaway Range Rovers came with the "Proline" 18-inch five-spoke alloy wheels. Body colors were available in Niagara Gray, Epsom Green, and Rutland Red.

The vehicles are badged with "CALLAWAY" on the upper engine plenum, and on the lower rear tailgate under the 4.6 HSE logs. Some examples also have Callaway stickers on the front fenders.

Inside, the Callaway Range Rovers received some additional wood surrounding the power window switches and HVAC controls, wood and leather steering wheels, and most had GPS.

=== C12 (Callaway C12 and IVM C12) ===
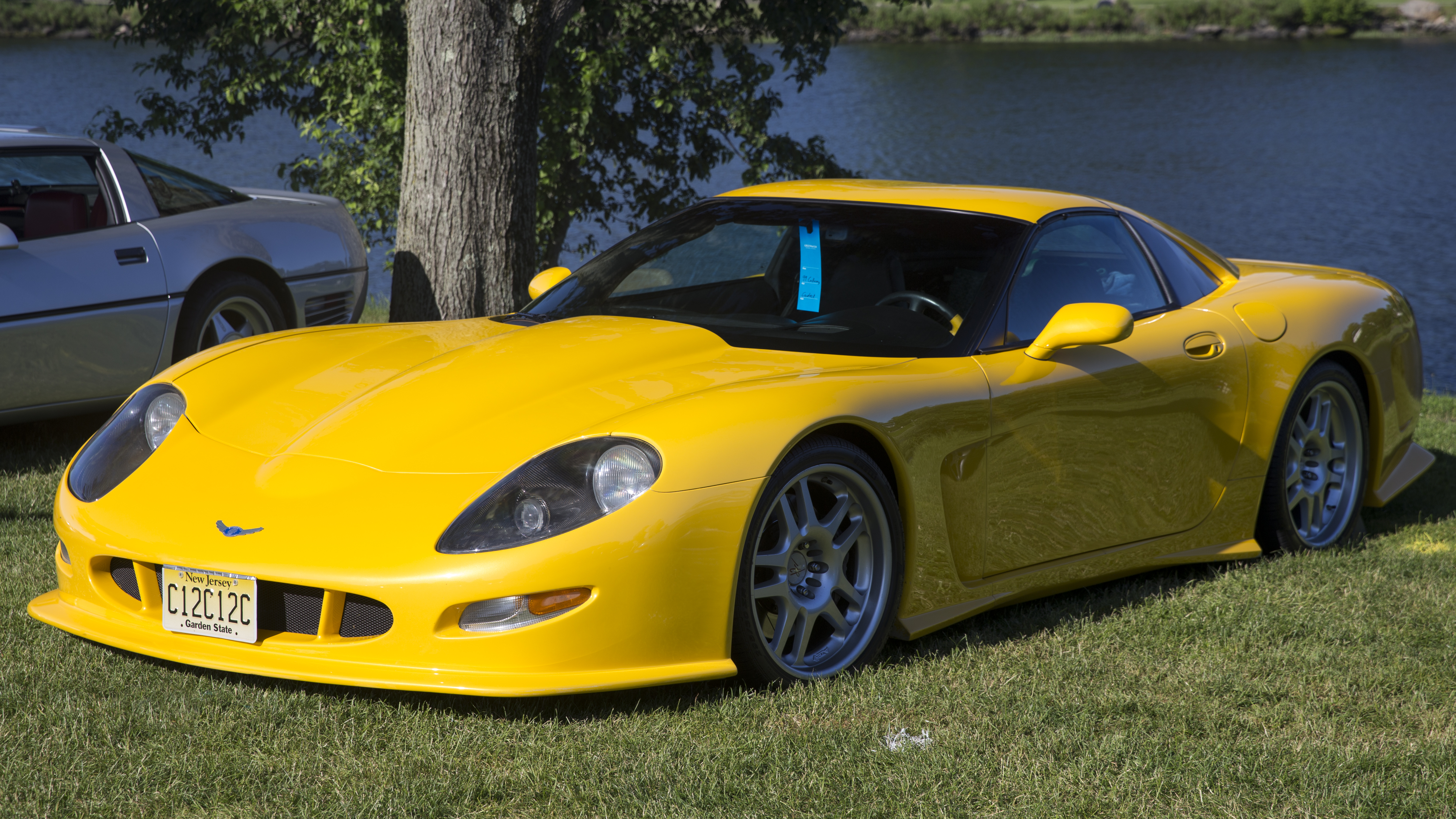
1999 Callaway C12

With the unveiling of the completely redesigned coach-built fifth-generation Corvette, Callaway went back to the drawing board as well. Produced from 1997 to 2001, Reeves Callaway sought to compete in the GT2 Class at the famous Le Mans race. The race car's crowning achievement was a pole position in the 2001 race. On the street, Callaway's C12 was a complete reworking of its C5 Corvette brother with only the roof and greenhouse left untouched. In total, 20 cars were produced with exposed headlights, two taillights as opposed to the traditional four, and complete leather-covered interiors dyed to the owner's specifications. The street-legal sports car model was also built in Bad Friedrichshall, Germany, by IVM Automotive as the IVM C12.

=== C13 (Holden Special Vehicles GTS Coupe) ===
Holden Special Vehicles (HSV) produced the HSV GTS 300 from 1999 to 2002. The GTS 300, named so because its engine's output was 300 kW (408 PS; 402 hp), was available in both HSV Coupe and HSV GTS bases. It was powered by a 5.7-litre Callaway-tuned C4B engine, based on the LS1 V8. At the time it was the most powerful Australian-made production car. Only 300 were produced by HSV, from 1999 to 2002, in Melbourne, Australia. There were 200 four-door GTS sedans and 100 Coupe GTS.

Callaway received production-line 5.7 L engines from GM's engine plant and replaced the original equipment cylinder heads, camshaft and valvetrain components with Callaway-designed parts, then shipped the engines back to Michigan where they were exported to Australia as Chevrolet RPO C4B engines. They were conservatively tuned and badged as 300 kW (408 PS; 402 hp) with a T56 six-speed manual transmission and four-piston caliper disc brakes all around; they were the flagship of Holden Special Vehicles.

Technical Specs

Once the original ECU was remapped, valve springs were replaced with performance double springs, titanium retainers were replaced, slightly shorter pushrods used, and the air intake and exhaust systems were modified, they produced in excess of 340 kW (462 PS; 456 hp). Camshaft specs: 224°/230° duration, .581" intake lift, .588" exhaust lift, 114 degrees overlap (red line at 6700 rpm) and using Shell 98/100 octane V-power gasoline, realized an increase in power to 375 kW (510 PS; 503 hp) or (503 bhp) at the flywheel and around 440 ft⋅lbf (600 N⋅m) to 460 ft⋅lbf (620 N⋅m) of torque) – approximately 298 kW (405 PS; 400 hp) to 310 kW (421 PS; 416 hp) at the rear wheels. Zero to 62 mph (100 km/h) in 5.2 secs, standing 1/4 mile ET of 13.9 seconds and an estimated top speed at 5000 rpm in 6th gear of approx. 284 km/h (176 mph).

C4B GTS cam is 212°/222°, .560"/.569", 116.9° LSA (as per Comp Cams check organized by Sonny from Marranos Enhancement Division, Sydney Australia).

=== C14 (Mazdaspeed Protegé) ===
Callaway Engineering was contracted to develop and apply a turbocharger system to the Mazda Protegé. Approximately 4,500 examples were built (1,750 2003MY and 2,750 2003.5MY), thus launching the MazdaSpeed Program to a commercial success.

- Developed using an MP3 edition Mazda Protegé, Callaway designed a compact turbo system which bumped power to 170 hp (over the MP3 Edition's 140 hp).
- Mazda used the same suppliers from the MP3 Program: Racing Beat, RacingHart, and Kenwood. But they included Callaway Cars to add turbocharging to the Protegé's powertrain.
- Callaway adapted a Garrett T25 ball-bearing turbo with an integral wastegate, and developed a unique turbine housing for this application.
- Manual 5-speed transmissions were the only way this vehicle could be had.
- Upgrades to the drivetrain included heavier (24 mm vs. 22mm stock) half-shafts and a Tochigi Fuji Sangyo KK Super limited-slip differential.
- Wheels were 7.0 × 17-inch aluminum alloys from RacingHart, wearing Z-rated 215/45 Bridgestone Potenza RE040 tires.
- Larger brakes were fitted, and a larger radiator for cooling.
- Colors were limited to Black and Spicy Orange, initially. Later, with the mid-year revision, Titanium Gray, Laser Blue, Sunlight Silver and Blazing Yellow were made available.

=== C15 (FIA Corvette GT3) ===
The Callaway Project C15 was originally known as the Corvette Z06.R GT3, a competition version of the Corvette C6 Z06 built to compete in the FIA GT3 category of GT racing. The cars are built at Callaway Competition's facility in Leingarten, Germany and raced in the FIA GT3 European Championship. With Chevrolet's 2014 Corvette model change, Callaway Competition began development of the C7 GT3-R racecar. The new car made its debut at the Hockenheimring in Germany in October 2015. The Chevrolet Division of General Motors granted exclusive authorization to construct, homologate and sell Corvette C7 GT3-Rs worldwide, except North America where Cadillac Racing campaigned in GT3. For the 2018 racing season, Chevrolet expanded their exclusive authorization to include North America, as the Cadillac Racing program was terminated.

The first three Z06.Rs were built for Callaway Competition themselves, followed by the rest for privateers. As of 2007, ten were built to compete in FIA GT3, as well as the ADAC GT Masters and Belcar series.

In 2007, the Callaway Competition team, competing under the Martini-Callaway title in the FIA GT3 European Championship, earned three race victories and three second-place finishes and won the Teams Championship. Drivers Luca Pirri and Jürgen von Gartzen took the runners-up in the GT3 Driver's Championship.

In 2010, Callaway drivers Christian Hohenadel and Daniel Keilwitz finished the season as FIA GT3 champions, taking four victories to secure the title with a round to spare. The knowledge and experience learned from the race program was used in the Callaway C16 series of road-going sports cars.

Except for 2011, Callaway Competition has been competing in the ADAC GT Masters series. The Callaway Corvette C6 and C7 racecars have also been active in other series. For the 2017 race season, Callaway and its drivers captured the ADAC GT Masters Teams Championship, Drivers Championship, Junior Championship and second place in the Trophy Championship.

=== C16 (Callaway C16) ===
Callaway C16
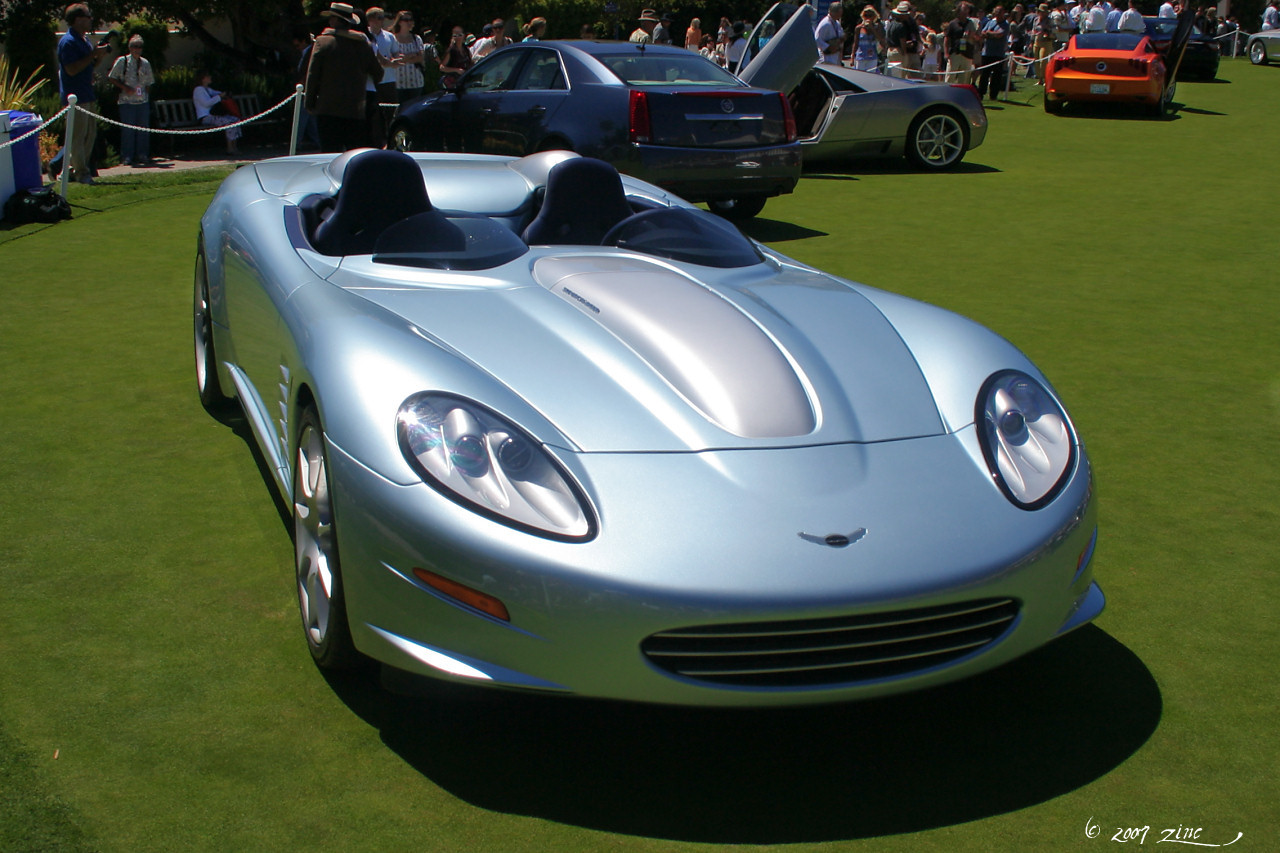

Overview
- Manufacturer: Callaway Cars
- Production: 2007
- Assembly: Irvine, California; Old Lyme, Connecticut; Leingarten, Germany
- Designer: Paul Deutschman

Body and chassis
- Class: Sports car
- Body style: Cabrio; Coupé; Speedster
- Layout: FR layout
- Platform: Fiberglass body on GM Y platform
- Related: Chevrolet Corvette C6

Powertrain
- Engine: 6.2 L (378 cu in) LS3 supercharged V8
- Transmission: 6 speed manual automatic paddle-shift transmission

Dimensions
- Wheelbase: 268.5 cm (105.7 in)
- Length: 410.0 cm (161.4 in)
- Width: 184.4 cm (72.6 in)
- Height: 122.2 cm (48.1 in)
- Curb weight: 1,530.9 kg (3,375 lb)

Chronology
- Predecessor: Callaway C12

The Callaway C16 is a bespoke automobile based on the C6 Corvette. The C16 is marketed as an alternative to the Porsche 911 GT3, the Lamborghini Murciélago, the Ferrari F430, or the 599 GTB and is offered in three different body styles: cabrio, coupé, and speedster.

It was unveiled at the Greater Los Angeles Auto Show in 2006. Production began in 2007. The car was sold fully equipped with a set of coordinated features such as the supercharged engine, full leather interior, proprietary Callaway/Eibach suspension system, the LeMans brakes, and carbon-magnesium wheels. Options included the selection of a comfort seat or a sportseat, carbon ceramic brakes, and fitted luggage. Cars were built to order, where the owner chooses the interior leathers and the exterior color. All cars were sold by Callaway directly and were supported by a five-year/50,000-mile powertrain warranty.

Like the Callaway C12, the only body panels the car retains from the C6 are the roof panel, the rear hatch and the rear view mirrors. The engine is a 6.2-liter (378 cu in) Callaway-modified LS3 V8, powered by an Eaton supercharger with air/liquid intercooler integral to intake manifold. Maximum manifold pressure is 50 inches HgA, or 10 psi (0.69 bar), producing 650 bhp (SAE). The engine has a cast aluminum block and heads with six-bolt cross-bolted main caps.

The bore and stroke are 4.060 × 3.622 inches, the compression ratio being 10.4:1. Maximum torque (SAE) is 585 ft·lbf at 4,750 rpm, with the redline at 6,500 rpm. Standard horsepower is 650 for the C16 Coupe and Cabrio, and 700 for the Speedster.

=== C17 (Callaway Corvette) ===
C17 represents the C6 Callaway Corvette Program through the 2013 model year. It was offered through select Chevrolet dealers around the United States and Canada:

- 2006–2007 Callaway Corvettes were offered in SC560 and SC616 (horsepower) levels.
- 2008–2013 Callaway Corvettes were offered in SC580, SC606, and SC652 (horsepower) levels.

A special model was offered in 2009, called the Reeves Callaway Signature Edition (RCSE). Featuring 606 hp (452 kW), the RCSE debuted the SC606 package and the RCSE interior group. Only 29 of the RCSE models were planned to be built and were only offered in Cyber Gray, Crystal Red, and Blade Silver. All wore Callaway nine-spoke aluminum wheels and introduced the new Carbon Fiber hood from Callaway.

In 2012, Callaway was reissued RPO B2K by Chevrolet Division to identify a very limited run of 25 Corvette Grand Sport Corvettes, both coupes and convertibles, automatics and manuals. A total of 26 cars were built, including #00, the pilot car. Each car was numbered, #00–#25, and had identical equipment, including special wheels, interior components, and a higher horsepower engine, developing 620 bhp. When tested by Motorweek TV, it was proclaimed as the quickest vehicle they have ever tested, running the 1/4 mi in 10.8 seconds at 128 mph.

=== C18 (2009–Present Callaway Camaro) ===
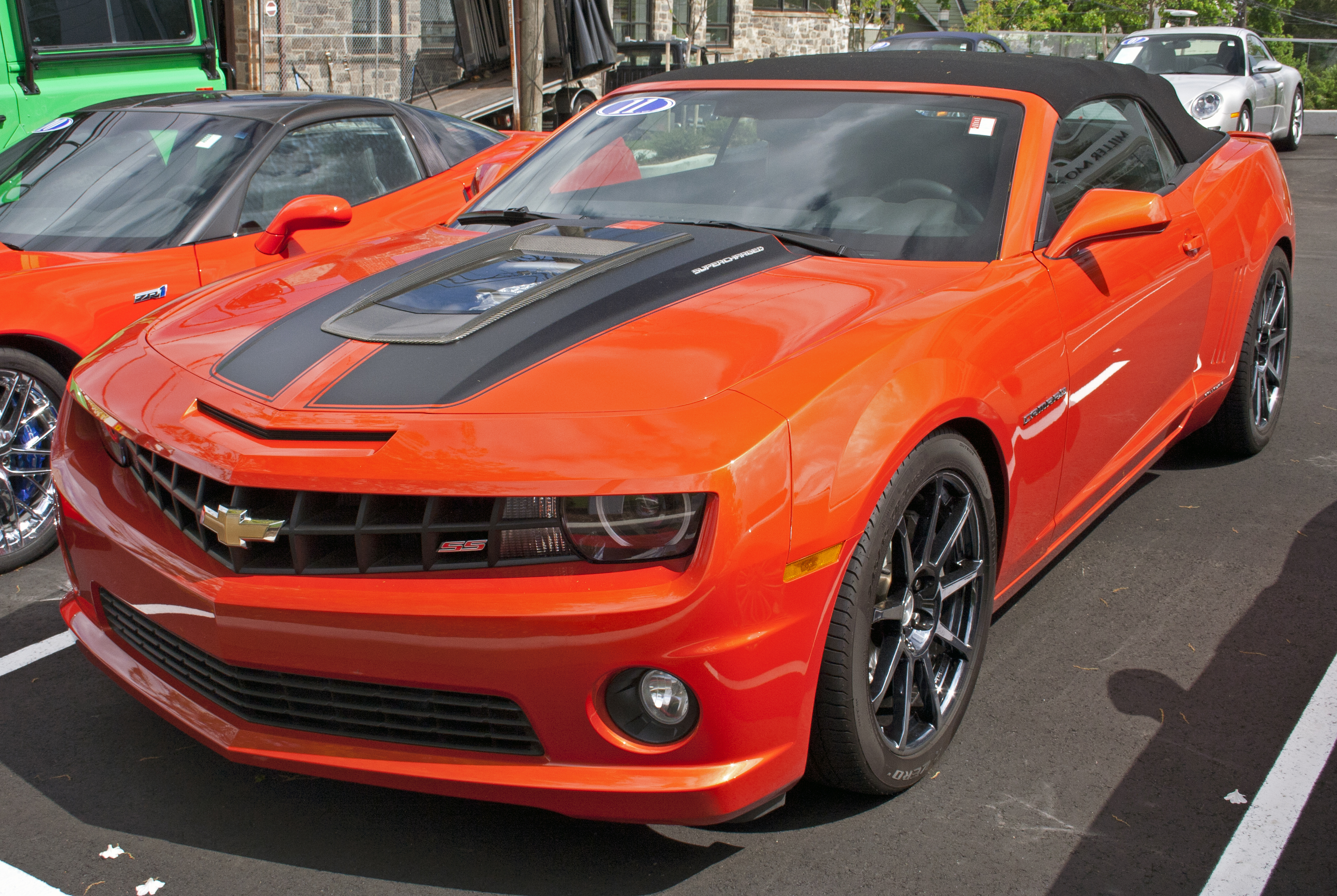
2011 Callaway Camaro SS Convertible (SC572)

C18 represents the Callaway Camaro vehicle and its specific components.

Initially, Callaway SC572 (manual) and SC552 (automatic) Camaros were offered. The alpha-numeric moniker designates the horsepower output of each. A tempered glass covered opening, surrounded in carbon fiber trim in the bonnet allows for a view of the engine.

Models for 2014–2015 included the SS variants in SC582 and SC562 trim (manual and automatic), along with the Z/28-based Callaway SC652 Camaro. The Callaway SC652 Z/28 Camaro represented the most powerful of all Callaway Camaros to date.

In 2016, the Callaway SC630 Camaro was introduced based on the Camaro SS. It is rated at 630 bhp at 6400 rpm, 610 lb-ft torque at 4400 rpm. Dragstrip results indicated a 0-to-60 mph time of 3.6 seconds and a quarter-mile mile performance of 11.6 seconds at 125 mph. The following year, the 2017–present Callaway SC750 Camaro ZL1 was introduced, and it is the most powerful of all Callaway Camaros to date, as of mid-2018: 750 bhp at 6500 rpm and 739 lb-ft torque at 3650 rpm (SAE). Dragstrip results indicated a 0-to-60 mph time of 3.2 seconds and a quarter-mile performance of 11.0 seconds at 128 mph.

=== C19 (Callaway SportTruck) ===
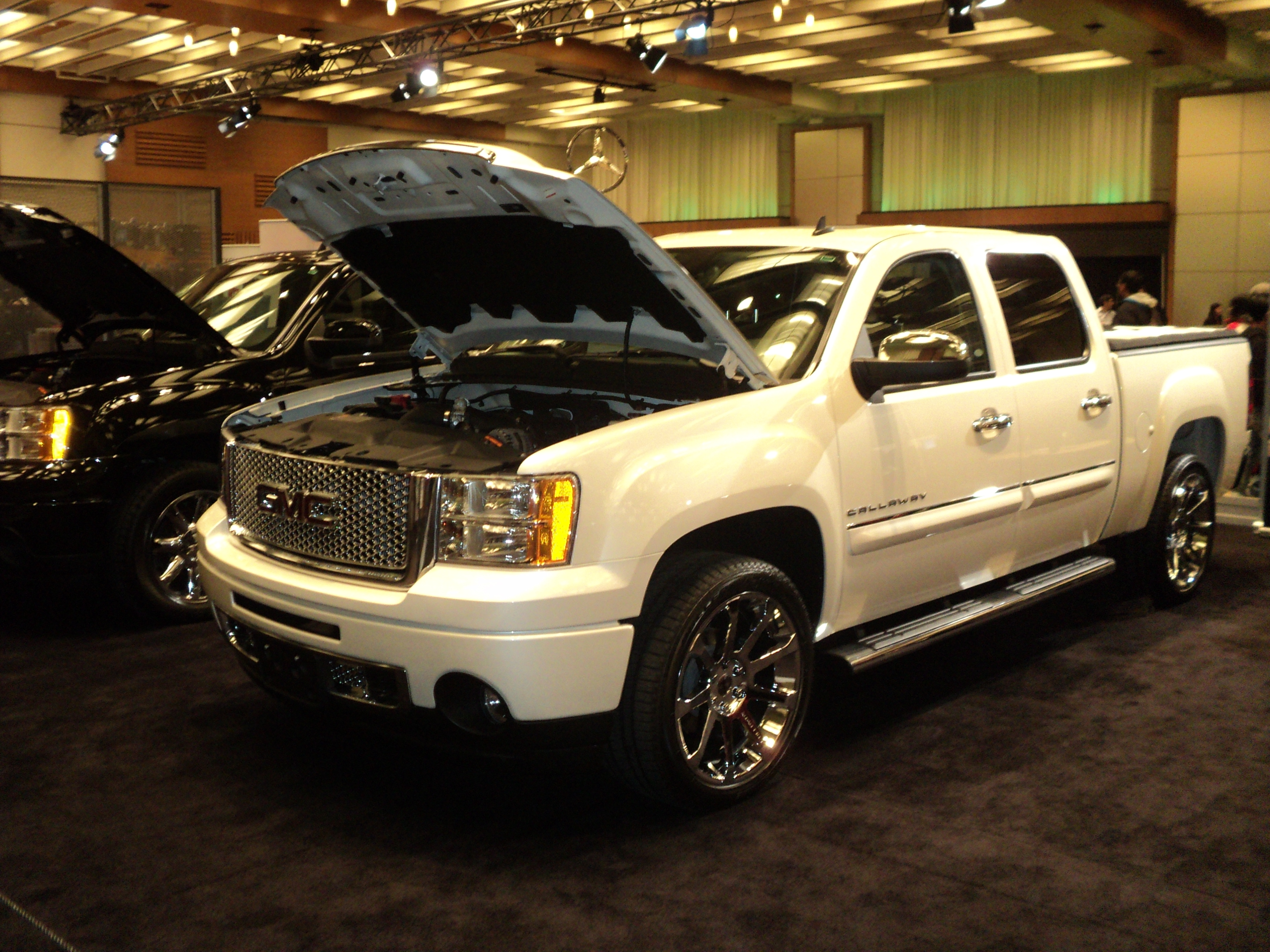
Callaway Sport Truck, 2013 model shown in Toronto.

C19 represents the Callaway SportTruck Program from 2011–present.

SC450, SC490, and SC540 Callaway SportTrucks were introduced in 2011, built upon the Silverado, Avalanche LTZ, Tahoe, Suburban, and (gasoline-engine) 2500HD-series trucks.

For the 2014 model year, the SportTruck series gained power with the new GM Direct Injection V8 engines as the basis. The 5.3 L engines were up from 450 hp to 460 hp. The 6.2 L V8 remained at 540 hp, but felt much quicker from the responsiveness of the new DI V8.

In mid-2015, Callaway replaced the original supercharger design with their new GenThree supercharger from the 2014 Callaway SC Stingray, adapting to the 5.3 L and 6.2 L direct injection V8 engines. Consequently, power was increased with the new Callaway supercharger. The 5.3 L-powered pickup trucks and SUVs produce 480 horsepower, while the 6.2 L equipped pickups and SUVs are rated at 560 horsepower.

For the 2015 model year, Callaway partnered with premier lift truck manufacturer, Rocky Ridge Trucks of Franklin Springs, Georgia, to build Callaway Edition Rocky Ridge pickups and SUVs. Rocky Ridge debuted their new Callaway edition truck at the Texas Motor Speedway on October 31, 2014. Chase and Bill Elliott were on hand to pull the cover from the truck at the official unveiling. In 2018, the business arrangement was terminated between the two companies.

During 2017, the "SportTruck" terminology was discontinued and Callaway pickups and SUVs began to be marketed with their individual model names: Chevrolet Silverado, Suburban and Tahoe; GMC Sierra, Yukon and Yukon XL; Cadillac Escalade and Escalade ESV.

=== C20 (Callaway Corvette) ===
Callaway unveiled the Callaway SC627 Corvette Z06 in April, 2015. The car has a number of bolt-on engine modifications, including the new GenThree supercharger that is 32% larger than the factory unit, as well as a new TripleCooled intercooler system and high flow intake systems to deal with the added power. Unlike the stock unit in the C7 Z06, the Callaway supercharger protrudes from the hood. When paired with the LT1 in the standard Stingray, the SC627 package creates 627 horsepower and 610 lb-ft of torque. The SC757 package creates 757 horsepower and 777 lb-ft of torque when paired with the LT4 of the Z06.

The Callaway Corvette package also includes emblems, badging and plaques bearing the Callaway name as standard equipment. Callaway provides a three-year, 36,000 mile warranty on Callaway components, which also covers any GM-supplied components that fail due to a failure of the Callaway parts. Warranty coverage can be upgraded to a 5-year, 60,000-mile powertrain service contract at an extra cost.

=== C21 (Callaway AeroWagen) ===
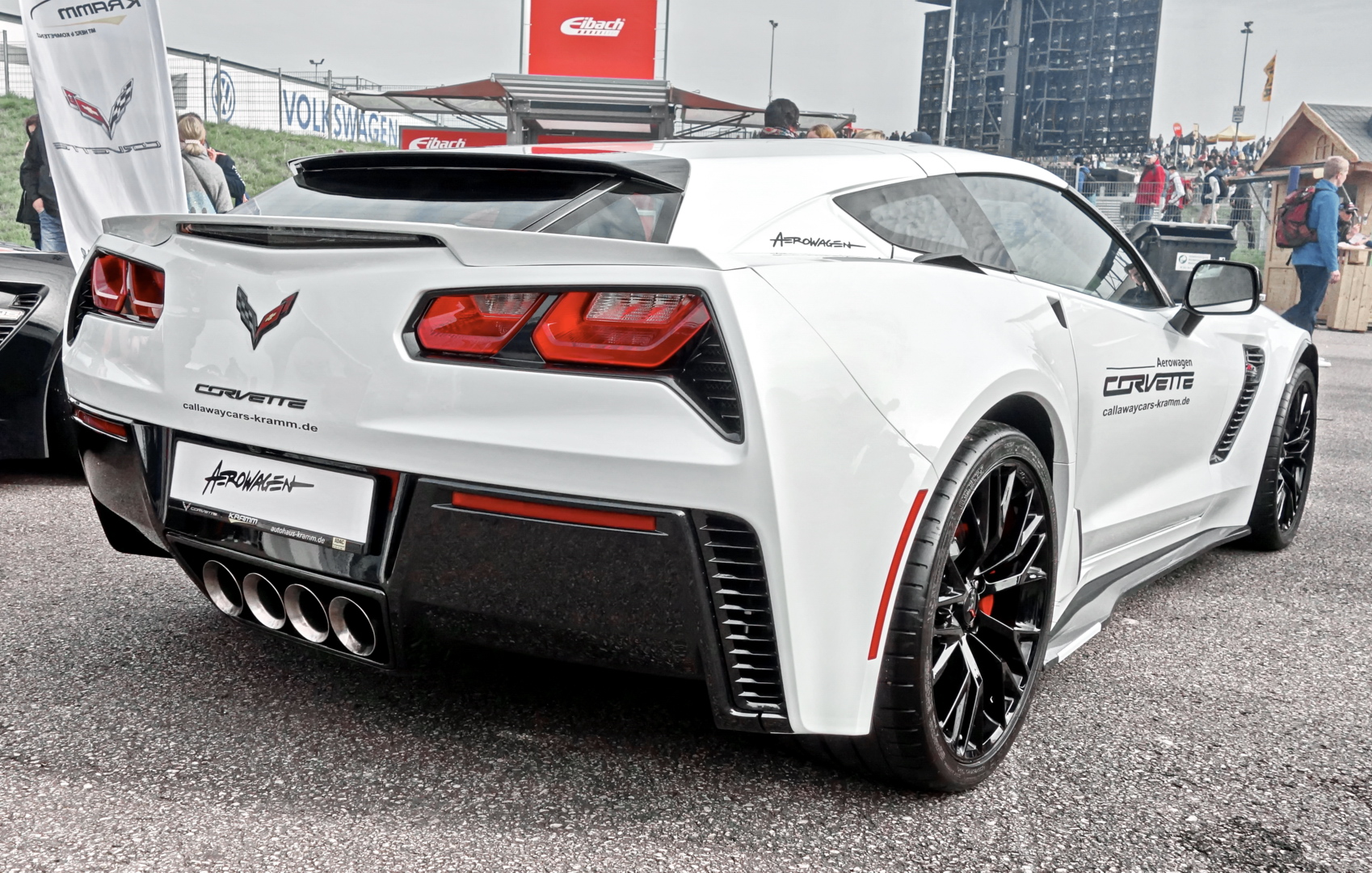
Callaway AeroWagen

In 2017, Callaway began producing the AeroWagen package. It was offered in the tradition of coach-built shooting brakes for any version of the C7 Corvette Coupe. Its components can be fitted to the standard production C7, the Callaway SC627 Stingray or Grand Sport, or the Callaway SC757 Z06. The AeroWagen hatch assembly is a part-for-part replacement of the original equipment Corvette rear hatch, using the original hardware and latching mechanisms. It operates in an identical fashion.

=== Un-numbered projects ===
==== Mercedes Benz 240D, 1983 ====
- Initially created for Callaway's own personal 240D
- Boosted stock power from 67 hp (50 kW) to an estimated 95 hp (71 kW)
- Covered in detail by Motor Trend in May 1983

==== Kohler Turbocharged Generator Sets, 1985 ====
Kohler Generator Division asked Callaway to increase the power output of a genset by 50%. Most standby generators are housed in rooms that are not easy to resize, yet the demands for standby, emergency, and backup power increase. If the same frame size could potentially produce more power, the economics are clear. Callaway supplied the development, testing, and subsequent production turbocharger systems to Kohler.

==== ISO Rivolta Grifo 90 Prototype, 1990–1991 ====
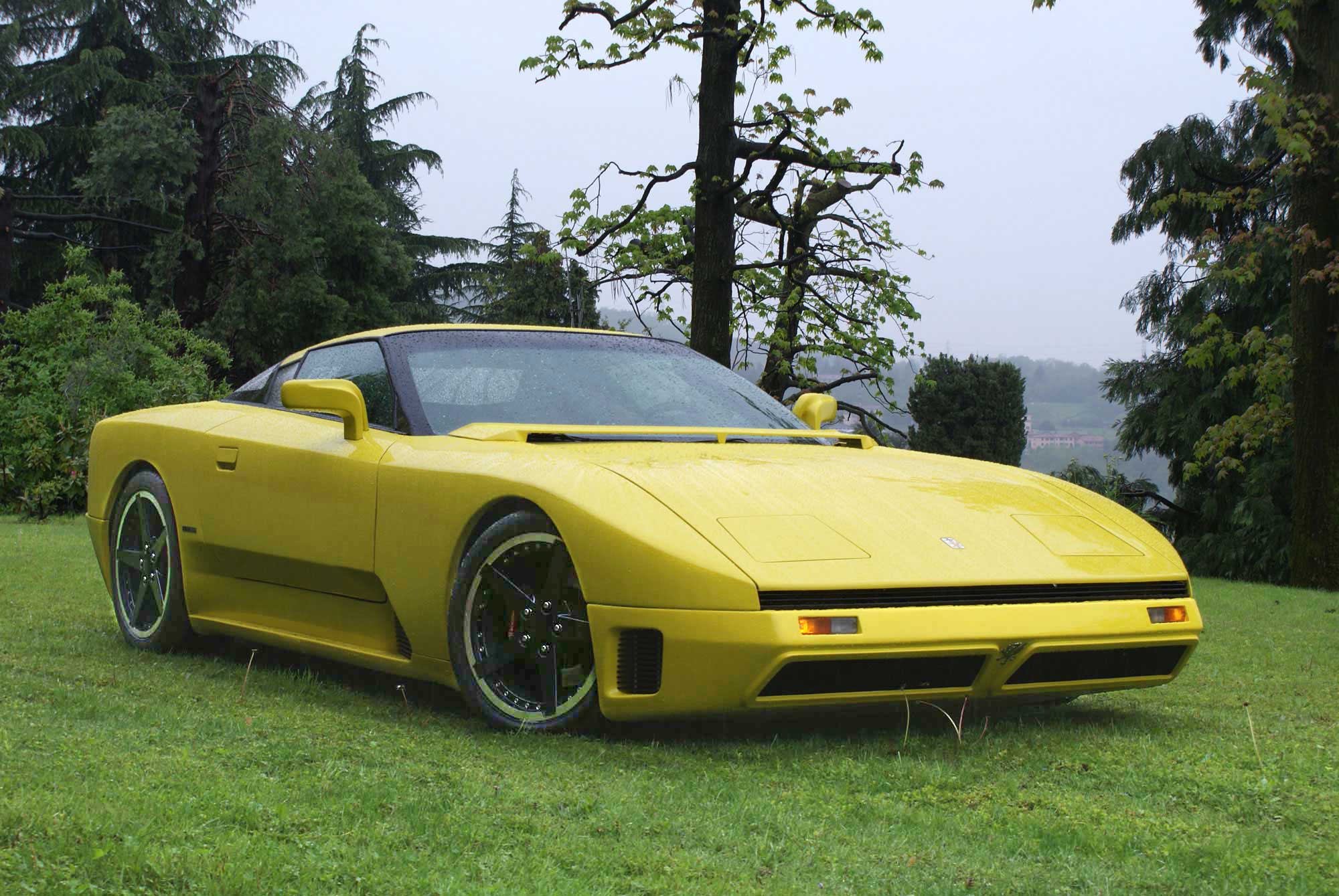
ISO Grifo 90

In 1990, Renzo Rivolta's son, Piero, asked Callaway to be the engine supplier to his new ISO Rivolta Grifo 90, a revival of the ISO Rivoltas from the 1960s and 1970s. The ISO Rivolta cars had DNA that included Italian coachwork and American V8 engines. The challenge was to create a powerful, modern, 1990s design and restart the car company. Three elements were brought together: Marcello Gandini (designer of the Lamborghini Miura, among others), Giampaolo Dallara (Dallara formula cars) and Callaway to be the contributors to the Grifo 90 Project. The design was penned, the full-size clay commissioned, and the car was presented to the press in Italy in the spring of 1990. The economics of the time prevailed and the promises of government financing never materialized, and the project halted.

==== Speiss Twin Turbo V8, 1991–1992 ====
The Speiss Supercar was commissioned by Robert Speiss to be constructed in his private factory in Gemmingen, Germany. Already a successful supplier of generators to industry, Mr. Speiss hired Karl Heinz Knapp to engineer and produce the world's first all-carbon composite sports GT car. Callaway was hired to design and produce the engine package based on its experience with the twin-turbo Corvette program for GM. Full compliance with EC regulations, 600 bhp and 600 lb-ft torque, bespoke configuration and production quality control were all requirements of the program. Unique intake manifolding, twin AiResearch turbochargers, and specially cast exhaust manifolds resulted in a svelte package. The project was cancelled before production began. However, the vehicle did meet all of its technical objectives.

==== Ruger-Stutz DV32 Turbo, 1993–2001 ====
William Ruger Sr., of arms-making fame, was in love with the Stutz DV32 in his youth. He challenged Callaway Engineering with the assignment: "If you were Harry Stutz, and you suddenly awakened knowing what is now known about engine technology, what would you do to the DV32?" Callaway's answer was a turbocharged, fuel injected version of the original Stutz 5.0-liter DOHC straight eight that made more than 300 bhp at 3800 rpm. The modernized engine drove a GM Turbo-Hydramatic 4L80E. Suitable power and torque for a 6000-pound automobile.

==== Callaway Cyclone V16, 2004– ====
The Callaway Cyclone V16 is a prototype engine for a future Callaway project.

Specifications:

- 16 cylinder, 90° V-angle, aluminum cylinder block with iron liners, aluminum cylinder heads
- 3,993.46 cc (243.7 cu in), naturally aspirated, electronic fuel injection
- Bore: 75.50 mm (2.972″)
- Stroke: 55.75 mm (2.195″)
- Compression ratio: 11.5:1
- Valvetrain: DOHC, 5 valves per cylinder, patented camshaft drive system
- Maximum horsepower: 550 bhp (410 kW) at 10,000 rpm (2.26 bhp/cid, 138 bhp/L)
- Peak torque: 340 lb⋅ft (461 N⋅m) at 8,500 rpm
- Maximum engine speed: 10,500 rpm
- Length: 926 mm (36.45″)
- Width: 540 mm (21.25″)
- Height to top of throttle body trumpets: 500 mm (19.70″)
- Dry weight: 152 kg (335 lb)
- Dry sump lubrication, triple plate 5.5″ diameter clutch, electronic coolant pump

== Notable models ==
=== 2012 RPO B2K Callaway 25th Anniversary Limited Edition Corvette ===
In 2012, Chevrolet re-released the RPO B2K for use with the Callaway 25th Anniversary Limited Edition Corvette.

The legendary RPO, which was first used on the 1987–1991 Callaway Twin Turbo Corvettes, returned for use on the Corvettes, commemorating 25 years of Callaway's relationship with the Corvette.

=== SledgeHammer Corvette ===
Callaway SledgeHammer Corvette

Overview
- Manufacturer: Callaway Cars Inc.
- Also called: Project SledgeHammer
- Assembly: Old Lyme, CT
- Designer: Paul Deutschman

Body and chassis
- Class: modified car
- Body style: coupé
- Layout: FR layout

Powertrain
- Engine: 5733 cc / 349.8 cu in V8 Callaway Twin Turbo; Dual Bosch fuel pumps feed the system
- Transmission: 6-speed manual (updated from 5-speed manual installed at time of record run)

Dimensions
- Wheelbase: 2,443 mm (96.2 in)
- Length: 4,483 mm (176.5 in)
- Width: 1,803 mm (71.0 in)
- Height: 1,186 mm (46.7 in)
- Curb weight: 1,589 kg (3,503 lb)

In a Car and Driver test event known as “Gathering of Eagles” (1987), Callaway drove a specially-modified Callaway Twin Turbo Corvette (C4), known as the "Top Gun" project, to a top speed of 231 mph (372 km/h), winning the magazine's shootout. A production Callaway managed a best of 187.95 mph (302.48 km/h).

Callaway wanted to push the top speed record further, while still maintaining good street manners, so the Callaway team developed the SledgeHammer Corvette. Reeves Callaway commissioned Paul Deutschman of Deutschman Design to develop the Callaway AeroBody for aerodynamic stability as well as for underhood air management. The engine that was used for the record run was built by Callaway. While very "streetable", it was highly modified, compared to the production Callaway Twin Turbo engines. Intercoolers were relocated from both sides of the intake manifold to the front of the engine, behind the bumper. Overall output was 898 horsepower (670 kW) at 6200 rpm, with 772 lb⋅ft (1,047 N⋅m) of torque at 5250 rpm. The car retained road car features such as power windows and locks, Bose radio, electronic air conditioning and, power sport seats with necessary race car safety modifications such as roll cage.

On October 26, 1988, and driven by John Lingenfelter, the car reached 254.76 mph (410.00 km/h) at the Transportation Research Center, Ohio, and was then driven back to Old Lyme, Connecticut.

The Callaway AeroBody would become commercially available. This would become the first of the partnerships with Deutschman Design; Paul also penned Callaway's later models such as the Speedster, SuperNatural, C7, C12 and C16.

==== Performance ====
- Power: 898 bhp (670 kW) at 6200 rpm
- Torque: 772.2 lb⋅ft (1,046.96 N⋅m) at 5250 rpm
- BHP/liter: 157.54 bhp (117.48 kW; 159.73 PS)/Liter
- Power-to-weight ratio: .6 hp/kg
- Top speed: 254.8 mph (410 km/h)
- 0–60 mph (97 km/h) acceleration: 3.9 seconds
- 1/4 mile: 10.6 seconds
