= Gessmann =

German manufacturing company

W. Gessmann
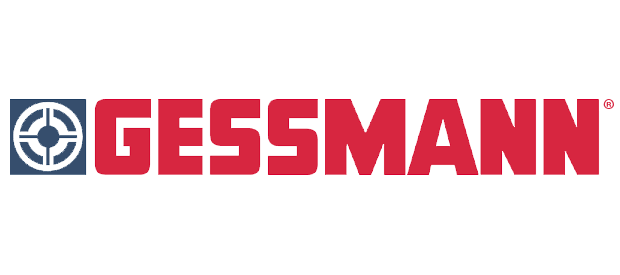
- Gessmann logo
- Company type: GmbH
- Industry: Manufacturer
- Founded: 1930, in Stuttgart, Germany
- Founder: Wilhelm Gessmann
- Headquarters: Leingarten, Heilbronn, Germany
- Area served: China, India, North America, UK, Poland
- Products: Industrial products
- Number of employees: 650
- Website: www.gessmann.com

W. Gessmann GmbH is a German worldwide manufacturer company of control devices for industrial applications.

It develops master controllers and joysticks for rail and industrial applications.

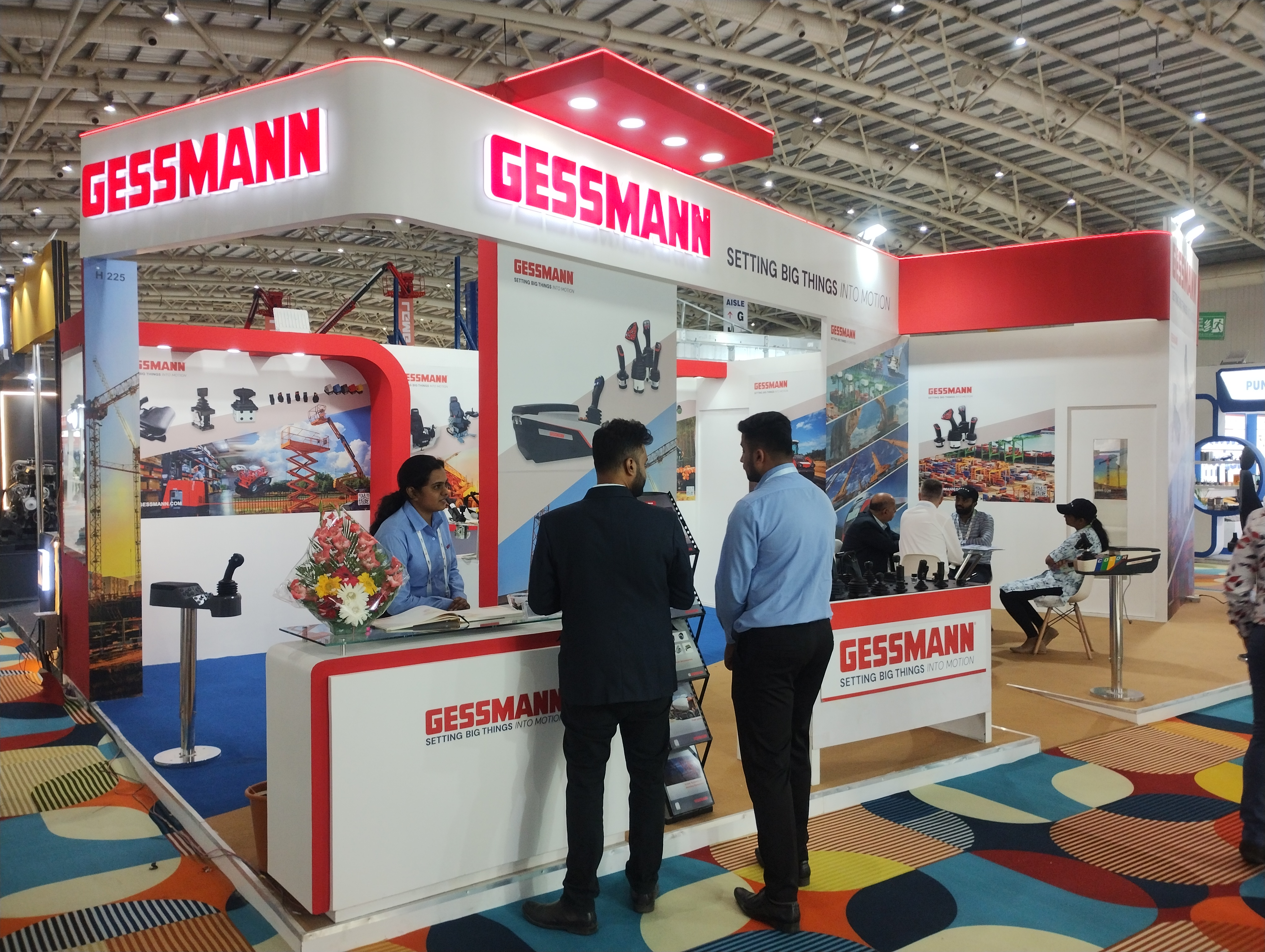
Gessmann at EXCON 2025, BIEC
