= Australian Performance Car Championship =

Motor racing title

The Australian Performance Car Championship was a CAMS sanctioned motor racing title for drivers of production based, high-performance coupes and sedans racing with limited modifications. It was staged as the Australian GT Performance Car Championship in 2003 and 2004 and as the Australian Performance Car Championship from 2005 to 2007.

== History ==
In 2001, the Australian GT Production Car Championship was, for the first time, contested in two divisions, GT Performance & GT Production. The former was for high-performance vehicles and the latter for less exotic production cars. For 2003 the divisions were formally awarded their own separate titles, namely the Australian GT Performance Car Championship and the Australian Production Car Championship. Following the demise of its category management company PROCAR Australia during the 2004 season, the Australian GT Performance Car Championship was renamed the Australian Performance Car Championship for 2005. The newly renamed title was contested for the last time in 2007 before being merged into the Australian Production Car Championship.

== Results ==
Championship	Champion	Car
2003 Australian GT Performance Car Championship	Mark King	Mitsubishi Lancer Evo VII
2004 Australian GT Performance Car Championship	Justin Hemmes	Subaru Impreza WRX STi
2005 Australian Performance Car Championship	Peter Floyd	HSV VYII GTS 300
2006 Australian Performance Car Championship	Gary Holt	Mitsubishi Lancer RS Evo VIII
2007 Australian Performance Car Championship	Gary Young	Mitsubishi Lancer RS Evo VIII
