= 2003 Australian GT Performance Car Championship =

Motor racing competition

Seasons
- ← 2002 2004 →

The 2003 Australian GT Performance Car Championship was a CAMS sanctioned national motor racing title for production based cars. Procar Australia was appointed as the category manager for the championship, which was staged as part of the 2003 Procar Championship Series. It was the inaugural Australian GT Performance Car Championship, GT Performance Cars having previously competed in the Australian GT Production Car Championship as a separate class.

The 2003 Drivers’ Championship was won by Mark King, driving a Mitsubishi Lancer Evo VII and the Manufacturers’ Trophy was awarded to Mitsubishi.

== Calendar ==
The championship was contested over an eight round series.

Round	Circuit	State	Date
1	Adelaide Parklands Circuit	South Australia	22 & 23 March
2	Symmons Plains International Raceway	Tasmania	27 April
3	Wakefield Park	New South Wales	1 June
4	Queensland Raceway	Queensland	15 June
5	Oran Park Grand Prix Circuit	New South Wales	13 July
6	Phillip Island Grand Prix Circuit	Victoria	10 August
7	Winton Motor Raceway	Victoria	21 September
8	Surfers Paradise Street Circuit	Queensland	23 & 24 October

Rounds were contested over three races except for the Oran Park round, which was contested over two races.

== Points system ==
Points towards the Drivers Championship were awarded in each race as per the following table.

Position	1st	2nd	3rd	4th	5th	6th	7th	8th	9th	10th	11th	12th	13th	14th	15th
Points	30	20	16	13	11	10	9	8	7	6	5	4	3	2	1

In addition, three championship points were awarded to the driver who obtained Pole Position for Race 1 at each round.

Points towards the Manufacturers' Trophy were awarded on the same scale as applied to the Drivers' Championship.

== Results ==
=== Drivers Championship ===
Position	Driver	No.	Car	Entrant	Points
1	Mark King	34	Mitsubishi Lancer Evo VII	Delphi / King Springs	350
2	Wayne Boatwright	60	Subaru Impreza WRX STi	Establishment Hotel Bilstien	311
3	Garry Holt	2	Mitsubishi Lancer Evo VII	Nepean EFI	222
4	Peter Floyd	300	HSV VX GTS; HSV VY GTS	Floyd Motorsport	219
5	Justin Hemmes	50	Subaru Impreza WRX STi	Establishment Hotel Bilstien	206
6	John Falk	87	Subaru Impreza WRX STi; FTE TE50	FRP Pools	200
7	Steve Cramp	27	BMW M Coupe	C.V.W Engineering/Scouts Aust	179
8	Graham Alexander	57	Mitsubishi Lancer Evo VII	Corio Auto Parts Plus	177
9	Barry Morcom	11	HSV VX GTS	Rondo Building Services	162
10	Bob Pearson	33	Mazda RX-7 Series 8	Pro-Duct Motorsport	158
11	Ian Box	666	Subaru Impreza WRX STi	BT Lift Trucks	134
12	Steve Knight	23	Mitsubishi Lancer Evo VI	Steve Knight	127
13	Bob Hughes	15	Mitsubishi Lancer Evo VI	Bob Hughes Special Vehicles	114
14	Gary Deane	91	Subaru Impreza WRX STi	G.P. Motorsport	98
15	Peter Boylan	7	BMW M3 E46	Quirks Refrigeration	94
16	Barrie Nesbitt	5	HSV VY GTS	Mortgage House	73
17	Robert Ogilvie	10	Mitsubishi Lancer Evo V	Driving Force	72
18	Beric Lynton	123	BMW M3 E46	Bruce Lynton BMW	55
19	Ric Shaw	35	Mazda RX-7 Series 6	Ric Shaw Performance	53
20	Aaron McGill	75	Nissan 200SX GT	Dux Hot Water	52
21	Paul Stokell	21	Volkswagen Golf R32	Volkswagen Dealer Racing	42
22	Mark Cohen	44	HSV VX GTS	Mark Cohen	31
23	Nathan Pilkington	77	Nissan 350Z	Nathan Pilkington	27
24	Michael Brock	88	Mitsubishi Lancer Evo VI	Michael Brock	23
25	Anton Mechtler	9	Mitsubishi Lancer Evo VII	Mek Tek Motorsport	22
26	Bruce Stewart	3	Mazda RX-7 Series 8	Pro-Duct Motorsport	16
27	Mike Fitzgerald	42	Nissan 200SX GT	Aussie Hire Building Equipment	15
28	Jim Stewart	41	Subaru Impreza WRX STi	Jim Stewart Racing	13
29	Trevor Haines	17	FTE TE50; FPV BA GT	FPV/Yamaha	12
30	Kenny Habul	75	BMW M Coupe	Go Karts Go	10
30	Ross Almond	6	Mitsubishi Lancer Evo VII	Nepean EFI	10
32	Dennis Gilbert	38	HSV VY GTS	Castran Gilbert Pty Ltd	8
32	John Grounds	16	Subaru Impreza WRX STi	Donut King	8
34	Anthony Alford	12	Nissan 200SX GT	Donut King	7
35	Stewart McColl	20	Volkswagen Golf R32	Volkswagen Dealers Australia	2
35	Warren Millet	18	HSV VX GTS	Wake-Up	2

=== Manufacturers’ Trophy ===
Position	Manufacturer	Points
1	Mitsubishi	1117
2	Subaru	831
3	HSV	495
4	BMW	338
5	Mazda	227
6	Ford	173
7	Nissan	108
8	Volkswagen	44

FTE and FPV models were considered to be Fords for the Manufacturers’ Trophy.
