= 2004 Australian GT Performance Car Championship =

Seasons
- ← 2003 2005 →

The 2004 Australian GT Performance Car Championship was a CAMS sanctioned Australian motor racing title, organised by Procar Australia as part of the PROCAR Championship Series and open to high performance coupes and sedans, racing with minimal modifications. It was the second running of the Australian GT Performance Car Championship.

During the running of the championship, PROCAR relinquished its Category Management rights back to the Confederation of Australian Motor Sport.

Justin Hemmes won the championship driving a Subaru Impreza WRX, defeating semi-factory Volkswagen Golf R32 driver Paul Stokell by 90 points. Mitsubishi Lancer driver Garry Holt was third.

== Calendar ==
The championship was contested over a seven round series.

Round	Circuit	State	Date	Format
1	Adelaide Parklands Circuit	South Australia	20–21 March	Three races
2	Oran Park Grand Prix Circuit	New South Wales	18 April	Three races
3	Sandown International Motor Raceway	Victoria	14–16 May	Two races
4	Winton Motor Raceway	Victoria	20 June	Three races
5	Eastern Creek International Raceway	New South Wales	16–18 July	Two races
6	Wakefield Park	New South Wales	6–8 August	Three races
7	Mallala Motor Sport Park	South Australia	17–19 September	Three races

== Points system ==
Points were awarded on a 30-24-20-18-17-16-15-14-13-12-11-10-9-8-7-6-5-4-3-2-1 basis to the top 21 classified finishers in each race except for the two rounds run over two races, where the second race was worth double points. An additional 3 points were awarded to the driver setting the fastest qualifying time at each round.

== Results ==
Position	Driver	No.	Car	Entrant	Points
1	Justin Hemmes	50	Subaru Impreza WRX STi	Merivale / Falken / Bilstein	433
2	Paul Stokell	22 & 2	Volkswagen Golf R32	Volkswagen Group Australia	343
3	Garry Holt	21	Mitsubishi Lancer Evo VIII	Eastern Creek International Karting	312
4	Ric Shaw	35	Mazda RX-7 Series 8 BMW M Coupe	Ric Shaw Racing	302
5	Beric Lynton	123	BMW E46 M3	Bruce Lynton BMW	276
6	Tim Leahey	2	Volkswagen Golf R32	Volkswagen Group Australia	260
7	Gary Young	4	Mitsubishi Lancer Evo VIII	Gary Young Racing	250
8	Peter Floyd	300	HSV VY GTS	kawasaki-fp.com	233
9	Steve Knight	23	Mitsubishi Lancer Evo VII; Mitsubishi Lancer Evo VIII	Mitsubishi Electric	217
10	Mark King	1	Mitsubishi Lancer Evo VIII	King Springs / Delphi	209
11	Barry Morcom	11	Mitsubishi Lancer Evo VIII	Nepean EFI	205
12	Steve Cramp	19	HSV VX GTS	CVW Engineering	190
13	Bob Hughes	15	Mitsubishi Lancer Evo VIII	Bob Hughes Special Vehicles	167
14	John Falk	87	FTE AUIII TE50; FPV BA GT	Team GT	154
15	Michael Brock	88	Mitsubishi Lancer Evo VIII	Coopers Pale Ale Racing	148
16	Ross Almond	26	Mitsubishi Lancer Evo VIII	Nepean EFI	139
17	Graham Alexander	57	Mitsubishi Lancer Evo VII	AC DELCO	132
18	Ian Box	666	Subaru Impreza WRX STi	BT Lift Trucks	109
19	Grant Park	55	Subaru Impreza WRX STi	Merivale / Falken / Bilstein / JVC	103
20	Warren Millett	301	HSV VY GTS	Wake Up!	101
21	Anton Mechtler	9	Mitsubishi Lancer Evo VII	Anton Mechtler	86
22	Nathan Pilkington	77; 2	Nissan 350Z; Volkswagen Golf R32	Tempt Gourmet; Volkswagen Group Australia	76
23	Peter Boylan	7	BMW E46 M3	Quirk's Refrigeration	70
24	Bob Pearson	33	Mazda RX-7 Series 8	PRO-DUCT Motorsport	68
25	Gary Jackson	28	BMW E46 M3	Bruce Lynton BMW	67
26	Barrie Nesbitt	5	HSV VY GTS	Barrie Nesbitt	60
27	Chris Alajajian	55	Subaru Impreza WRX STi	Merivale / Falken / Bilstein / JVC Mobile Entertainment	56
28	Craig Dontas	27; 45	BMW M Coupe; HSV VY GTS	Jack Hillerman Smash Repairs; Brice Metals Youthworks	40
29	Trevor Haines	17	FPV BA GT	Team GT	38
30	Mark Cohen	44	HSV VY GTS	Mark Cohen	36
31	Wayne Boatwright	60	Subaru Impreza WRX STi	Falken / Bilstein / JVC	28
32	Paul Mitolo	63	Mazda RX-7 Series 8	Novatec Construction Systems	24
33	Trevor John	6	Mitsubishi Lancer Evo VIII	Toshiba	23
34	Charlie Kovacs	45	HSV VX GTS	Charlie Kovacs	23
35	Don Pulvar	96	Nissan 200SX GT	Advanced Power	21
36	Mark Brame	6	Mitsubishi Lancer Evo VIII	Toshiba	13
37	Dennis Gilbert	38	HSV VY GTS	Castran Gilbert / The Age	12
38	Hugh Harrison	147	Alfa Romeo 147 GTA	Monza Motors	11
39	John Grounds	16	Nissan 200SX GT	Donut King	5
40	Richard Catchlove	200	Nissan 200SX GT	Donut King	2
