= Dautel =

German manufacturer

Dautel is a German company, headquartered in Leingarten, manufacturing hydraulic tail lifts and dumpers for trucks. It is one of the several German companies that returned production back to Germany in the mid-2000s.

== History ==
The blacksmith Ernst Dautel did fitting work for horse driven wagons. His son, Emil Dautel learned the trade from him and founded the manufacturing company in 1933. The company profited heavily by the demand in construction work after the World War II.
