= Leingarten =

- Town
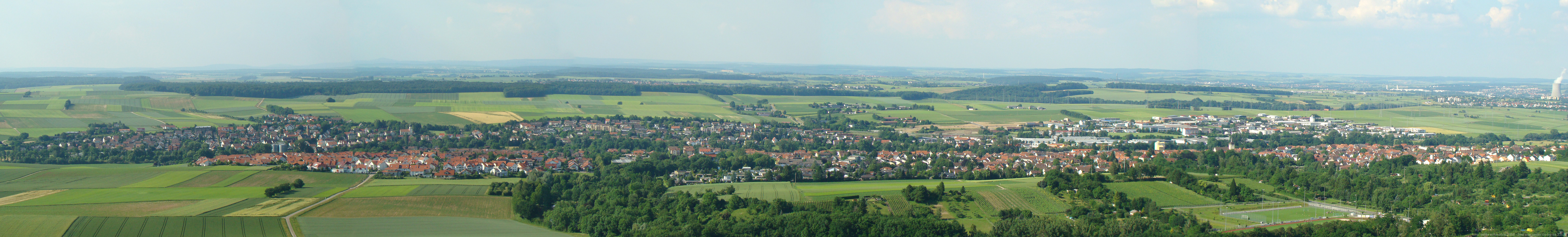
- Panorama view

- Coat of arms

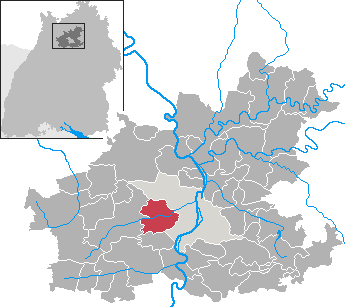
- Location of Leingarten within Heilbronn district
- Interactive map of Leingarten
- Location within Germany Location within Baden-Württemberg
- Coordinates: 49°9′N 9°7′E
- Country: Germany
- State: Baden-Württemberg
- Admin. region: Stuttgart
- District: Heilbronn
- Subdivisions: 2

Government
  - Mayor (2018–26): Ralf Steinbrenner

Area
  - Total: 23.48 km^{2} (9.07 sq mi)
- Elevation: 168 m (551 ft)

Population (2025-12-31)
  - Total: 11,595
  - Density: 493.8/km^{2} (1,279/sq mi)
- Time zone: UTC+01:00 (CET)
  - Summer (DST): UTC+02:00 (CEST)
- Postal codes: 74211
- Dialling codes: 07131
- Vehicle registration: HN
- Website: www.leingarten.de

Leingarten (German: [ˈlaɪnɡaʁtn̩]) is a town in the district of Heilbronn, Baden-Württemberg, Germany. It is situated 7 km west of Heilbronn. It was formed 1 January 1970, when the municipalities of Großgartach and Schluchtern merged.

== Geography ==
=== Location ===
Leingarten is situated in the west of the district of Heilbronn at the Lein, a feeder of the river Neckar, at the base of the Heuchelberg.

Leingarten consists of the formerly independent municipalities Großgartach und Schluchtern, both have grown seamlessly together since they merged.

Neighbouring cities and municipalities are (clockwise, beginning in the east): Heilbronn, Nordheim (Württemberg) and Schwaigern.

== Main sights ==
Visible from afar is Leingarten's trademark, the Heuchelberger Warte (Heuchelberg Watch), built 1483 by Duke Eberhard I of Württemberg.

In 2011 major renovation work began on Leingarten's city hall which included installing a new facade on the historically important building.

== Twin municipalities ==
Leingarten's is twinned with:

- Lésigny, France, since May 1975
- Asola, Italy, since 30 October 2004

== Notable people ==
=== Honorary citizen ===
- Hermann Eppler (born 1937), longtime mayor of Leingarten (1970-2002), honorary citizen of Leingarten since 2012

=== Other persons associated with the place ===
- Ortwin Czarnowski (born 1940 in Tempelberg), former cyclist and teacher, lives in Leingarten

== See also ==
- Dautel
