= HSV Coupé =

Australian sports car

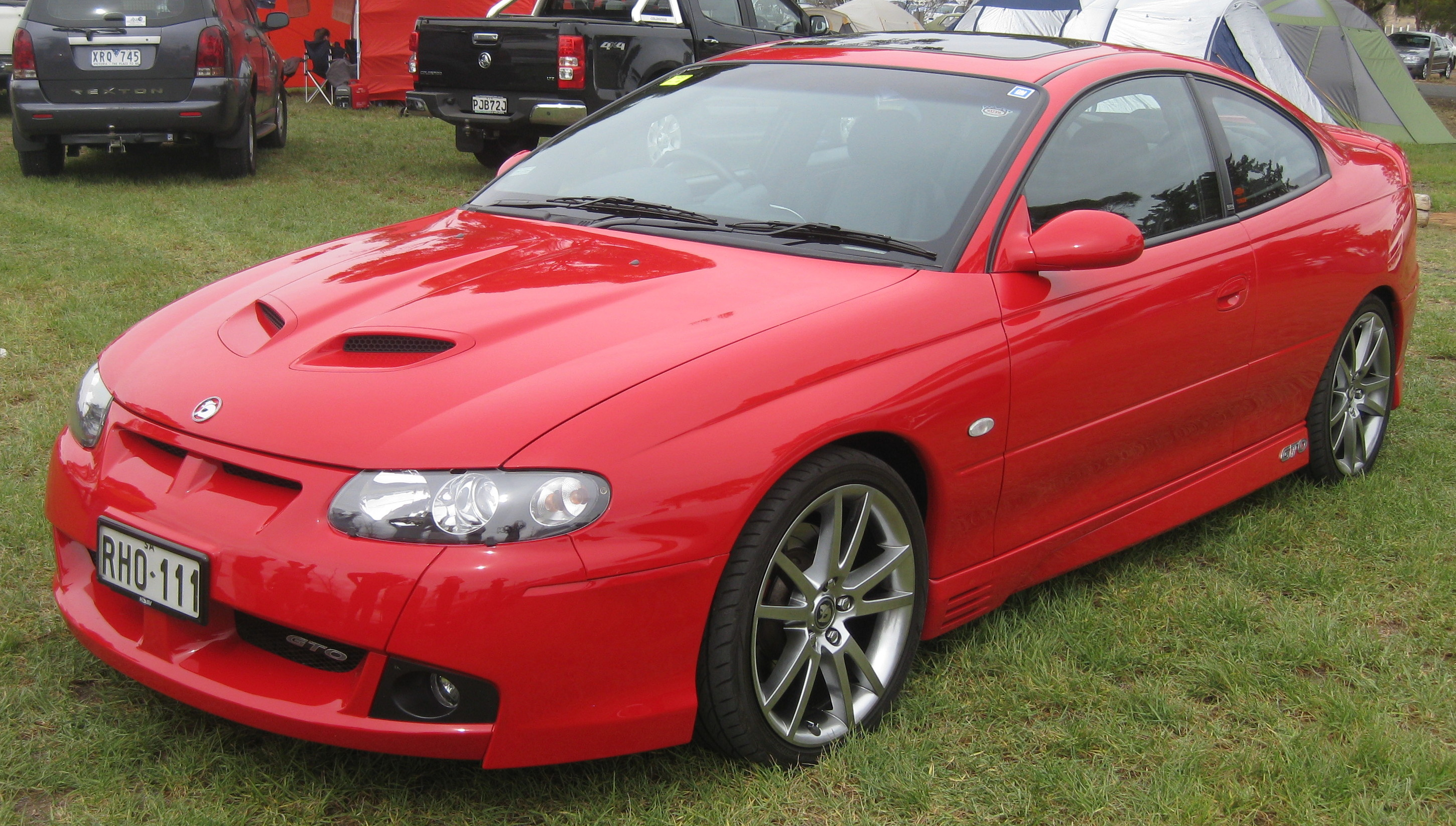
- HSV Z-series Coupé GTO

Overview
- Manufacturer: Holden Special Vehicles
- Production: 2001–2006
- Assembly: Australia: Clayton, Victoria

Body and chassis
- Class: Sports car
- Body style: 2-door Coupé
- Layout: Front-engine, rear-wheel-drive Front-engine, all-wheel-drive (Coupé 4)
- Platform: GM V platform
- Related: Holden Monaro; Pontiac GTO

Powertrain
- Engine: 5.7 L LS1 V8; 5.7 L C4B V8; 6.0 L LS2 V8
- Transmission: 4-speed automatic 6-speed Tremac T56 manual

The HSV Coupé is a sports car based on the Holden Monaro and produced from 2001 to 2006 by Holden Special Vehicles, Holden's designated performance vehicle division. An all-wheel drive, luxury variant called the Coupé4 was released in 2004.

== Coupé ==
The HSV Coupé GTO was the entry level variant, was released in 2001 and is powered by a 5.7-litre LS1 V8 engine producing 255 kW (342 hp). The Coupé GTS was released in February 2002, and is powered by a 5.7-litre LS1 V8 tuned by Callaway Cars called the C4B producing 300 kW (402 hp) and 510 N⋅m (376 lb⋅ft). A four-speed automatic transmission was optional in the GTO, with the GTS only available with a 6-speed Tremac T56 manual transmission until 2003.

In March 2003 the Coupé GTO Series II was released, increasing the power to 260 kW (349 hp). The Coupé GTO Series III was released in September 2003, it increased the power to 285 kW (382 hp) and 510 N⋅m (376 lb⋅ft), with the first 100 units were designated as a limited edition GTO LE. The Coupé GTS became special order only from February 2004 onwards, and was discontinued in 2004, with the release of the Coupé4.

The Z-series Coupé GTO released in October 2004, and is powered by a 6.0-litre LS2 producing 297 kW (398 hp) and 530 N⋅m (391 lb⋅ft). In 2006 the special edition Signature Coupé was released, limited to 70 units, as well as the limited edition GTO LE. Production of the Monaro ended at the Holden Elizabeth Plant in December 2005, with production of the HSV Coupé continuing until 14 June 2006. A total of 423 GTS Coupé units were produced.

== Coupé 4 ==
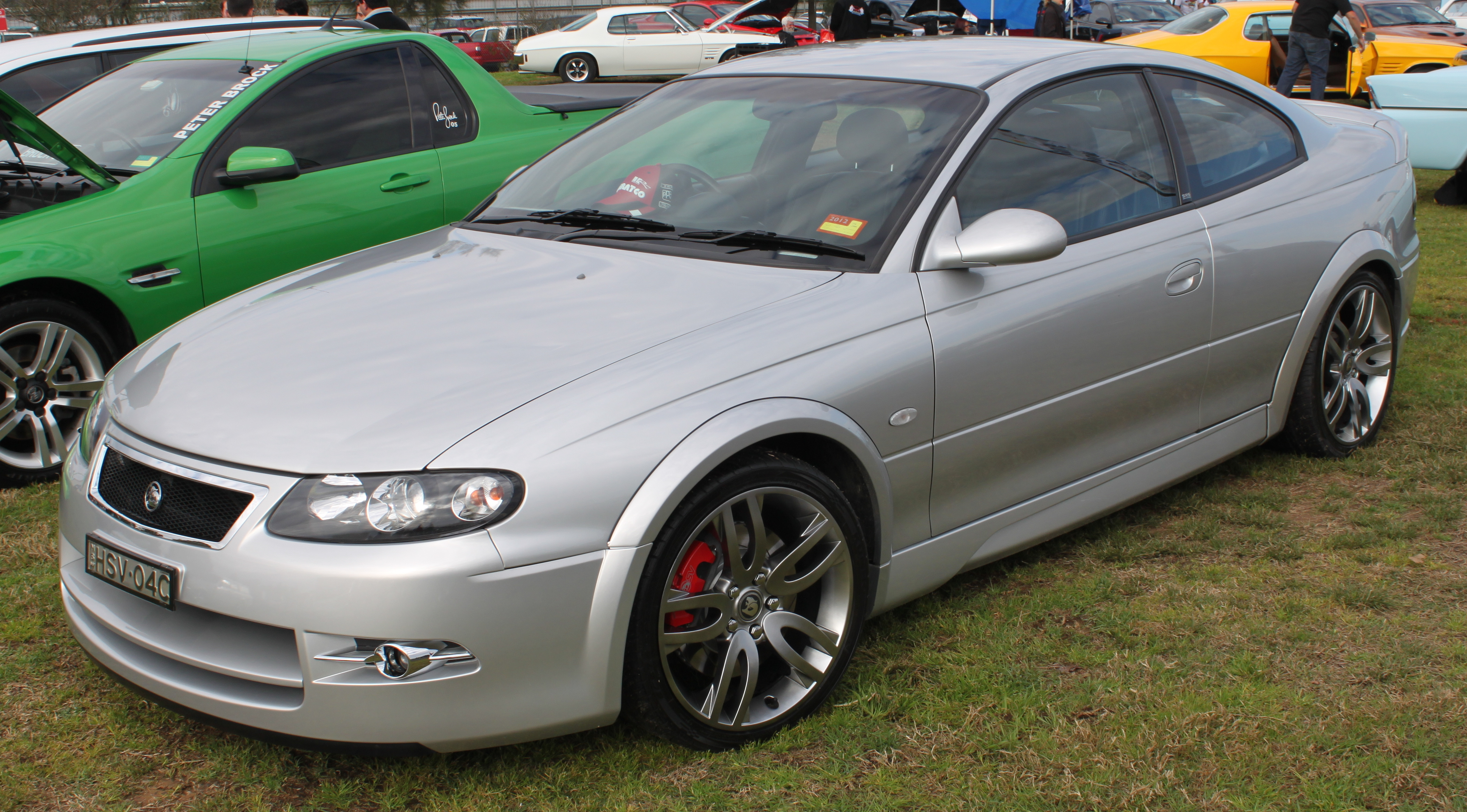
HSV Coupé4 (V2)

The HSV Coupé 4 was first shown at the 2003 Sydney Motor Show, and was released in July 2004. It was a grand tourer, and targeted the sports-luxury segment.

It was powered by a 5.7-litre LS1 V8 producing 270 kW (362 hp) and 475 N⋅m (350 lb⋅ft), paired with a four-speed automatic transmission, with a permanent all-wheel drive system.

The Coupé4 was based on the body of a Pontiac GTO in left-hand drive, chosen for the GTO's quad exhaust system. The all-wheel drive system was derivied from the Holden Adventra, replacing the CV joint with flexible coupling from the Adventra's system for the rear differential. It was rear-biased with a 38:62 split of torque and 55:45 front to rear weight distribution. A production line with a multi-million dollar robot was installed in Holden Special Vehicle's Clayton, Victoria facility to build the Coupé4, adding the car's flares, installing the mounting points and crossmembers for the all-wheel-drive system, and converting the car from left-hand drive to right-hand drive. A total of 132 Coupé4 units were produced.

== Concepts ==
=== HRT 427 concept ===
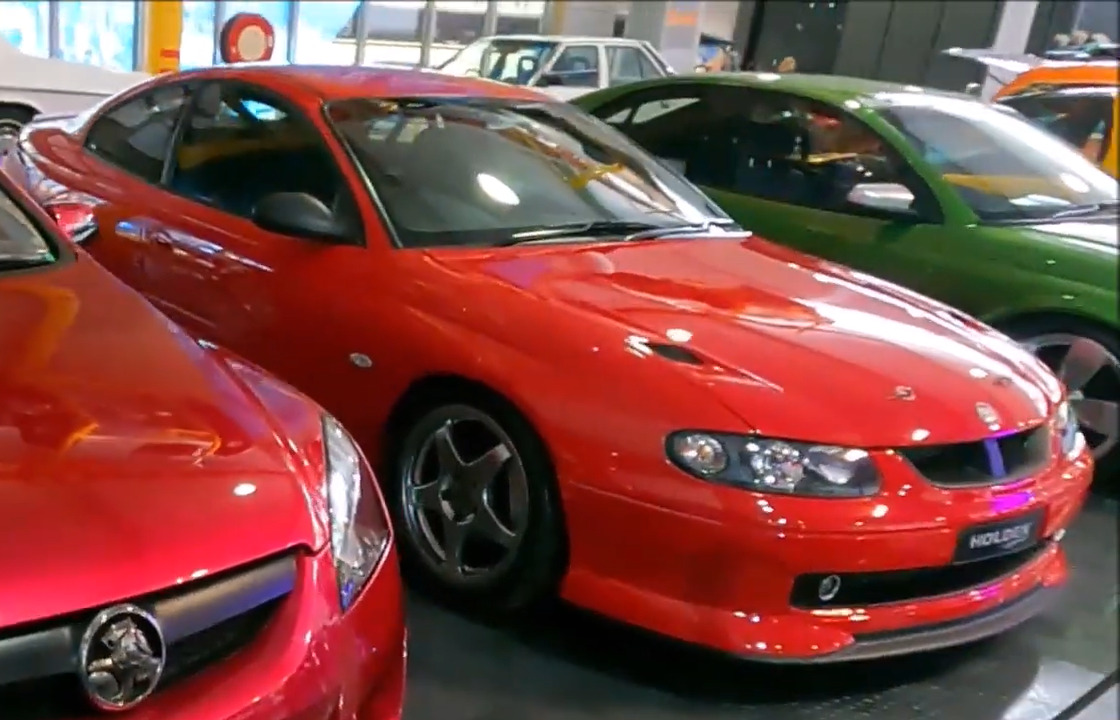
HRT 427 concept

The HRT 427 concept was unveiled at the 2002 Sydney Motor Show, named after Holden Racing Team (HRT) and its engine displacement of 427 cubic inches (7 litres), it was planned to sell 50 units for $215,000 AUD each. The concept never made it to production, with only two units being made.

The 7.0 L V8 was derivied from one used in the Chevrolet Corvette C5R, using unique pistons and cylinder-heads, it produced 420 kW (563 hp) and 780 N⋅m (575 lb⋅ft) of torque, paired to a six-speed T56 manual transmission. It weighed 100 kg (220 lb) less than the Coupe GTS, by using magnesium wheels, a carbon fibre bonnet, and removing the rear seats and air conditioning.

=== GTS-R concept ===
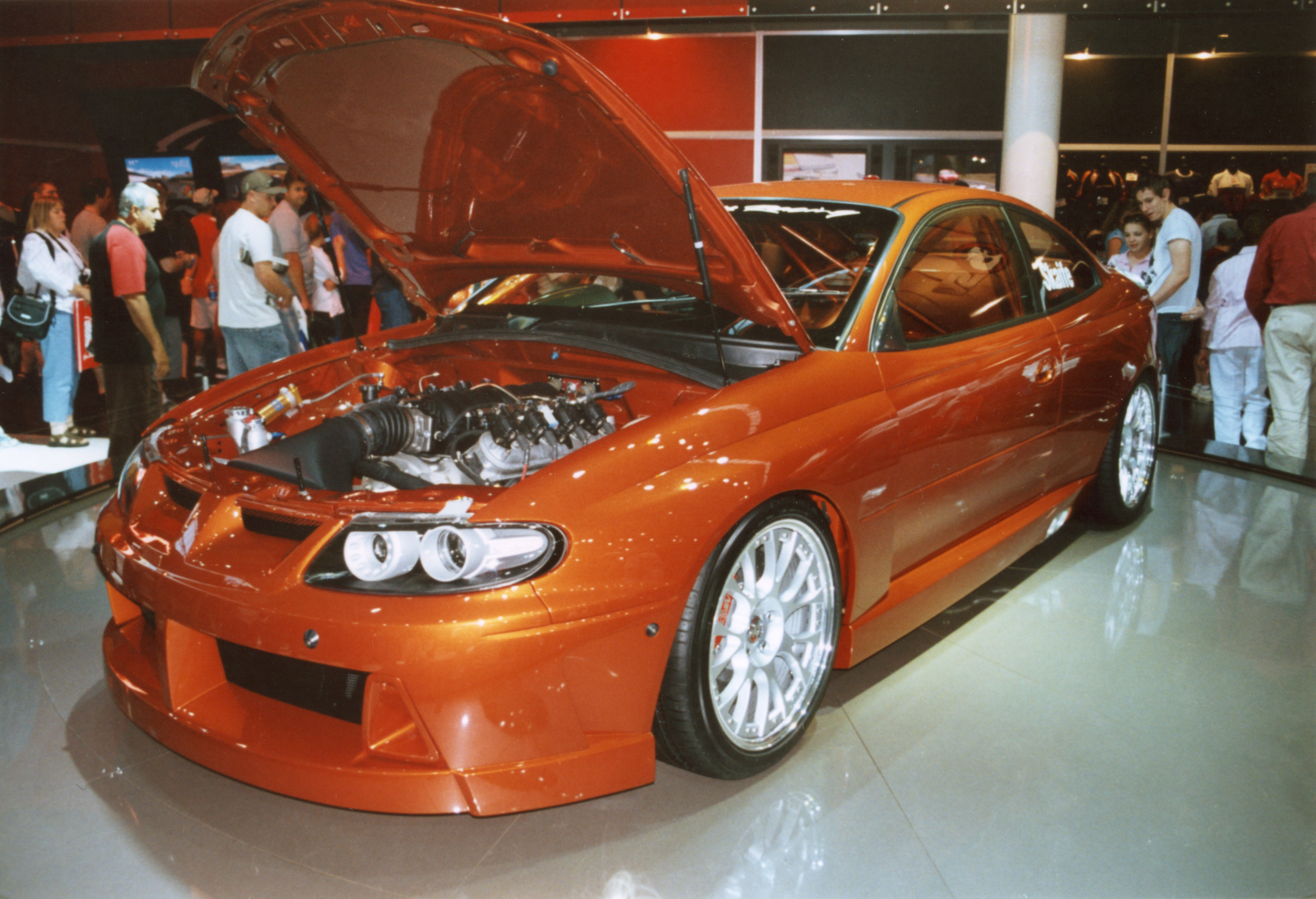
GTS-R concept

The Coupe GTS-R concept was unveiled at the 2004 Sydney Motor Show, and was intended as a track car. It was powered by a 6.0 L LS2 V8 producing 335 kW (449 hp) and 605 N⋅m (446 lb⋅ft) of torque, paired with a six-speed manual transmission. It featured a roll cage made of chromoly, ceramic matrix composite brakes, and remote reservoir dampers.
