= FPV GT =

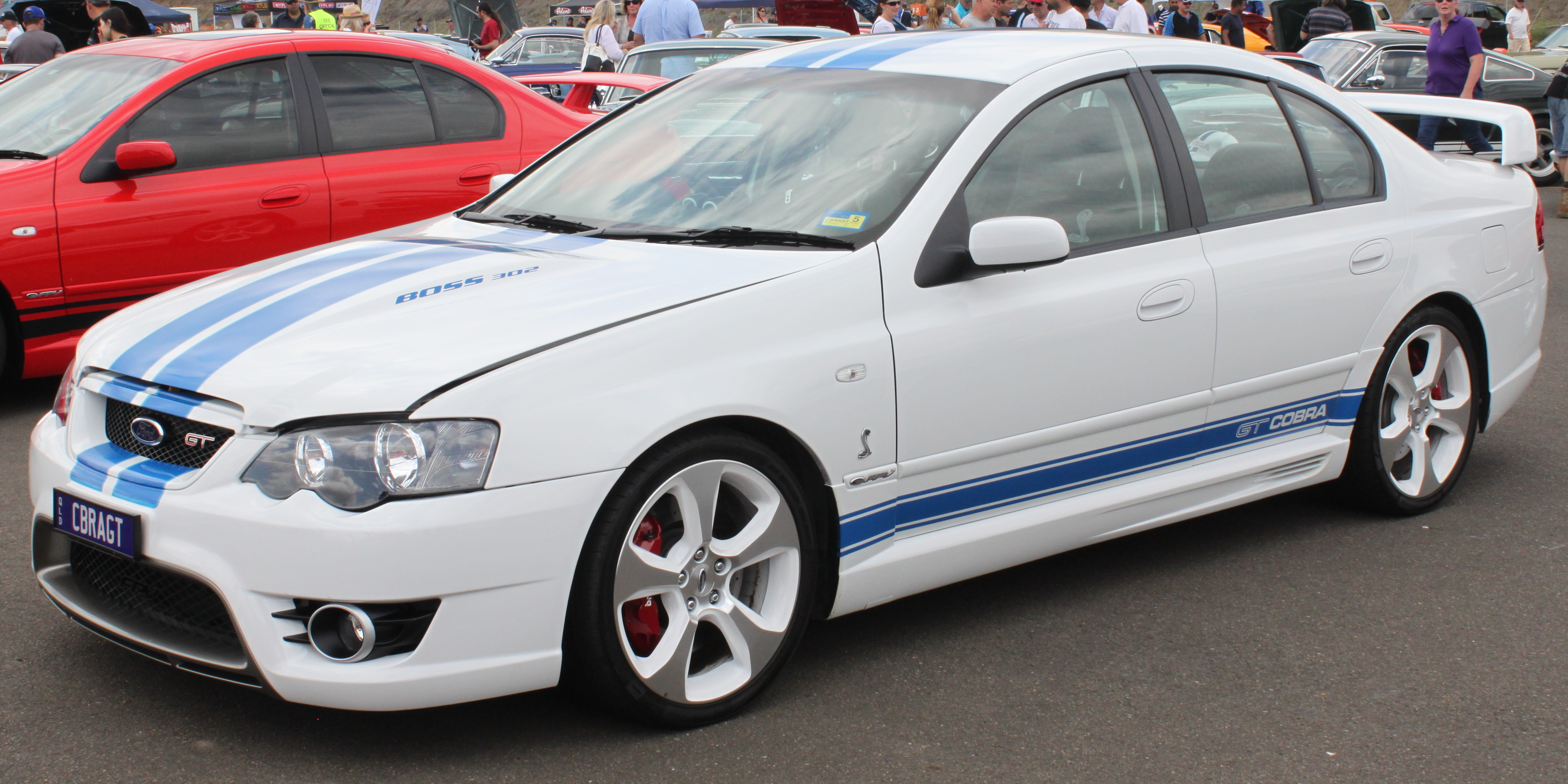
- FPV GT Cobra (BF)

Overview
- Manufacturer: Ford Performance Vehicles
- Production: 2004–2014

Body and chassis
- Class: Full-size car
- Body style: 4-door sedan
- Related: Ford Falcon; FPV F6; FPV GS; FPV Pursuit

Powertrain
- Engine: 5.4 L Boss 290 V8; 5.4 L Boss 302 V8; 5.4 L Boss 315 V8; 5.0 L Miami supercharged V8

Chronology
- Predecessor: Ford Falcon GT

The FPV GT is an full-size sedan produced by Ford Performance Vehicles from 2003 until 2014.

== Models ==
=== BA Series ===
The FPV BA GT was introduced in 2003, with a 5.4-litre Boss 290 V8 at 290 kW (389 hp) at 5500 rpm and 520 N⋅m (384 lb⋅ft) of torque at 4500 rpm. It had a 5-speed TR-3650 manual transmission, standard 325mm front rotors by PBR, with optional 355mm front discs by Brembo. The GT-P was based on the BA Fairmont, it came with dual-zone air conditioning, Brembo brakes, and a trip computer.

=== BF Series ===
The FPV BF GT was introduced in 2005. It had four-piston front and single-piston rear callipers by Brembo, with the GT-P having six-piston front callipers and four-piston rear callipers.

In April 2007 the FPV GT "40th Anniversary" released, all were produced with a black exterior with gold stripes. In 2008 the FPV GT "Cobra" (also called the "Cobra R-Spec") released, all were produced with a white exterior and blue stripes. It had a 5.4-litre Boss 302 V8 producing 302 kW (405 hp) and 540 N⋅m (398 lb⋅ft) of torque. 400 GT Cobras were produced, 100 Cobra Utes based on the FPV Super Pursuit were also produced.

=== FG Series ===
The FPV FG GT was introduced in 2008. It had a 5.4-litre Boss 315 producing 315 kW (422 hp) at 6500 rpm and 551 N⋅m (406 lb⋅ft) of torque at 4750 rpm. In 2008 the GT-E was released, a luxury variant of the GT.

In 2010 the supercharged Miami V8 replaced the Boss engines in FPV's vehicles, in the GT range it produced 335 kW (449 hp) and 570 N⋅m (420 lb⋅ft) of torque.

In 2012 the FPV GT R-Spec was released, all were produced in black with red highlights.

The FPV GT-F 351 was released in 2014, it was powered by a 5.0-litre supercharged Miami V8 producing 351 kW (471 hp) at 6000 rpm and 551 N⋅m (406 lb⋅ft) of torque at 2500-5500 rpm. It had six-piston front brakes, four-piston rear brakes by Brembo, and was speed limited to 250 km/h.

In 2014 the FPV GT-F 351 set the record for fastest Australian production vehicle, reaching a top speed of 297 km/h. Wheels magazine brought a GT-F 351 to Stuart Highway with its speed limiter removed for the record, being driven by the racing driver John Bowe.
