= HSV GTS =

Australian performance car

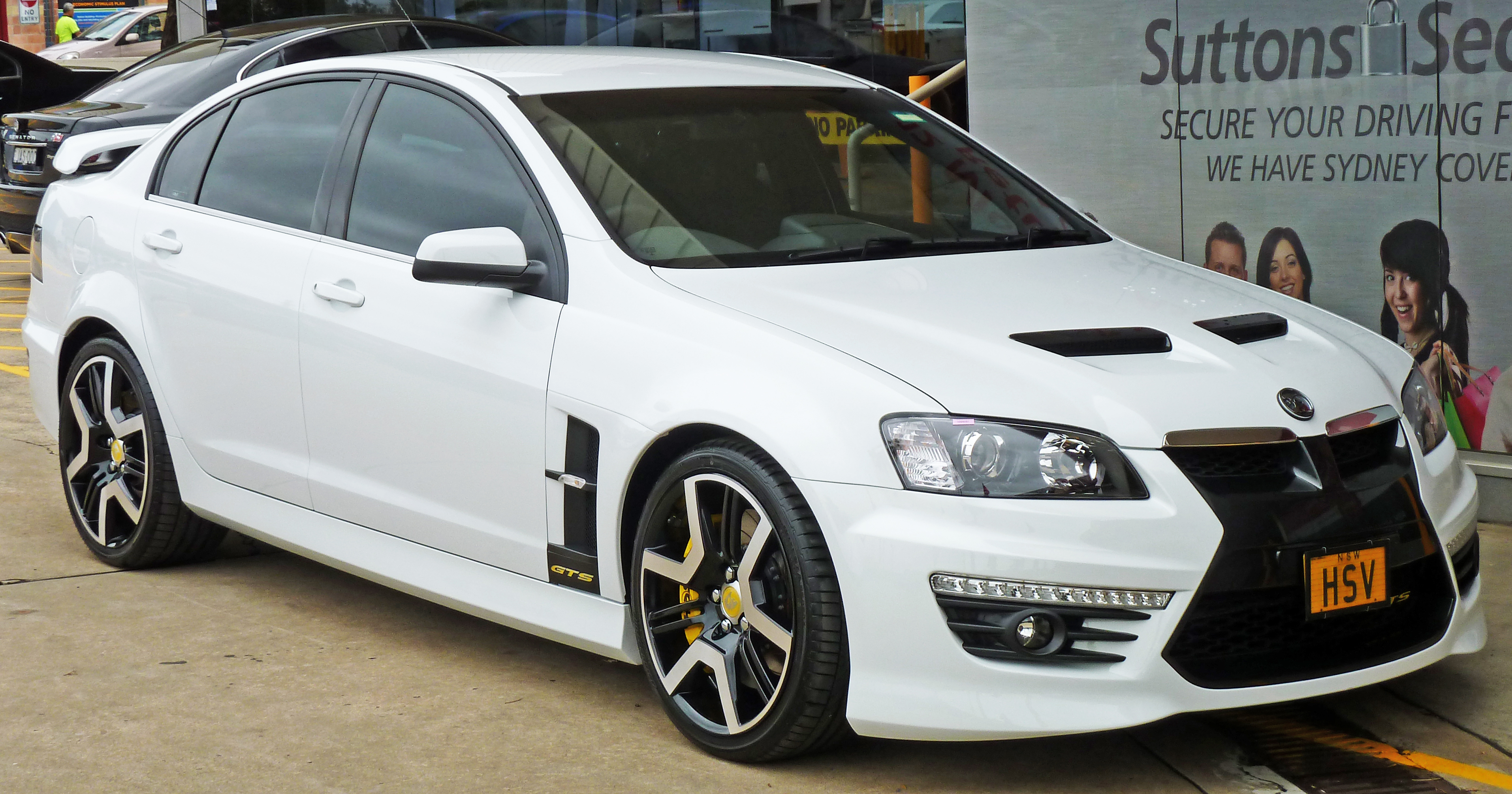
- 2010 HSV GTS (VE Series 3)

Overview
- Manufacturer: Holden Special Vehicles
- Also called: Vauxhall VXR8
- Production: 1992–2017
- Assembly: Australia: Notting Hill, Victoria; Clayton, Victoria

Body and chassis
- Class: Full-size
- Body style: 4-door sedan
- Platform: GM V platform (1992–2006); GM Zeta Platform (2006–2017)
- Related: Holden Commodore

Powertrain
- Engine: 5.0 L 5000i HEC V8; 5.7 L HSV stroker V8; 5.7 L LS1 V8; 6.0 L LS2 V8; 6.2 L LS3 V8; 6.2 L LSA supercharged V8; 6.2 L LS9 supercharged V8 (GTSR W1)
- Transmission: 5/6-speed manual 4/6-speed automatic

Chronology
- Predecessor: HSV VL SS Group A SV; Holden HZ GTS (GTS nameplate)

The HSV GTS is a performance vehicle produced by Australian company Holden Special Vehicles, the performance division of Holden, from 1992 to 2017. It was HSV's flagship model.

== History ==
Before the introduction of the HSV GTS in Australia the HSV GTS V6 was a New Zealand-exclusive export, launched in 1990 during the VN, continuing to 1992 with the VP series. Both models utilised the 3.8-Litre Buick V6 engine.

The HSV GTS was introduced in 1992 with the VP series as a flagship model for the HSV brand, featuring more luxury fittings, along a higher output 5.0-litre Holden V8 engine at 200 kW (268 hp) and stronger running gear.

The VR series GTS, introduced in 1994 used the 5.7-litre stroker 5000i Holden V8 at 215 kW (288 hp). The VS Series GTS, launched in April 1995 with the same power, improved the brakes, and added electronic rear suspension levelling.

In 1996, in the VS Series the HSV GTSR was released, as a limited production run featuring a worked engine, custom interior and unique XU3 Yellah paintwork. These cars have since sold for upwards of A$1,000,000.

In 1997 the VT series GTS released, originally with the 5.7-litre Holden V8 stroker at 220 kW (295 hp). The VT II series GTS 300 released in April 2000 with a Callaway-tuned C4B engine at 300 kW (402 hp), based on the LS1. Both the VX series, launched in November 2000 and Y series GTS, launched in 2002 retained the 300 kW (402 hp) C4B. There was no Z Series GTS made.

The E series GTS, launched in 2006 was offered with a LS2 at 307 kW (412 hp), shared with the rest of the HSV E series range. The E Series 2 GTS, launched in September 2009 was powered by a LS3 at 325 kW (436 hp), it also introduced twin bonnet scoops, daytime running lights, and a competition setting for the electronic stability control. The E Series 3, launched in September 2010 was powered with a LS3 at 325 kW (436 hp), and introduced a bi-fuel option using LPG and petrol.

The Gen-F GTS, launched in 2013 powered by a supercharged LSA at 430 kW (577 bhp). The HSV GTSR nameplate was returned for HSV's Gen-F 2 series in 2015, powered by a supercharged LS9 at 435 kW (583 hp).

In 2017, HSV announced the HSV GTSR W1, of which 275 examples (250 for Australia, 25 for New Zealand) were produced. The GTSR W1 featured a supercharged 6.2-litre LS9 at 474 kW (636 bhp), with custom carbon fibre parts, and interior. Additionally, four examples of the HSV GTSR W1 Maloos were produced. The GTS was discontinued in 2017.
