= Ford Territory (Australia) =

Australian mid-size crossover SUV

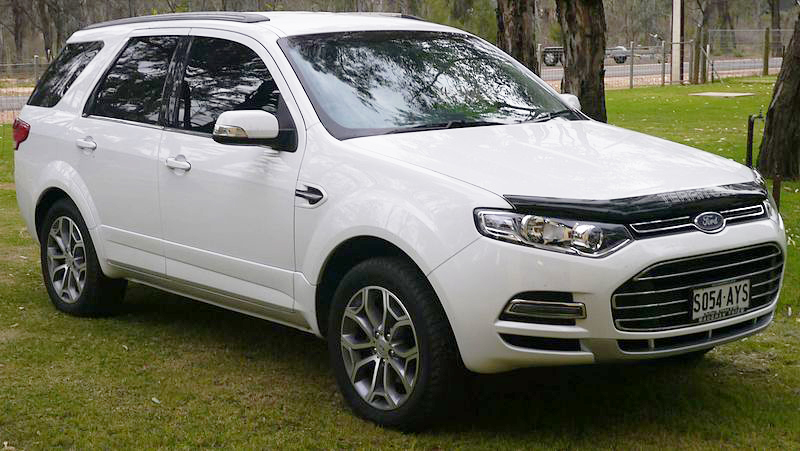
- 2013 Ford Territory (SZ) Titanium TDCi

Overview
- Manufacturer: Ford Australia
- Production: April 2004 – October 2016 (178,214 produced)
- Assembly: Australia: Melbourne, Victoria (Broadmeadows)
- Designer: Simon Butterworth (exterior); Marcus Hotblack (interior)

Body and chassis
- Class: Mid-size SUV (D-segment)
- Body style: 5-door crossover SUV
- Layout: Front-engine, rear-wheel-drive Front-engine, all-wheel-drive
- Related: Ford Falcon (Australia)

Dimensions
- Wheelbase: 2,842 mm (111.9 in)
- Length: 4,856 mm (191.2 in)
- Width: 1,898 mm (74.7 in)
- Height: 1,714 mm (67.5 in)
- Kerb weight: 2,015–2,045 kg (4,442–4,508 lb)

Chronology
- Predecessor: Ford Explorer; Ford Falcon wagon
- Successor: Ford Endura (2018–2020); Ford Everest (2015–present)

The Ford Territory is a mid-size SUV produced by Ford Australia from 2004 to 2016. It was the only SUV built in Australia and Ford's first large three-row crossover SUV.

It won various automotive awards and was the first SUV to win the Australian title of Wheels Car of the Year in 2004, due to its acceptable handling and child carrying capacity.

Ford Australia reportedly spent A$500 million on developing this vehicle over a four-year period. Many Australian toolmakers were lauded for their cost competitiveness in keeping this cost so low, not as cheap as the Japanese, but much lower than Detroit-based cars. Apart from being the first and only Australian-made SUV, it was also the first local vehicle to feature electronic stability control.

The Ford Territory was originally based upon the EA169 platform (codenamed E265) introduced in the AU Falcon for the SX, SY, and SY II models. Later models of the Territory were based on the E8 platform of the FG Falcon for the SZ and SZ II models (codenamed E265A).

== Design ==
Both rear-wheel drive (RWD) and all-wheel drive (AWD) configurations were available for the Australian market. AWD models had an optional Hill Descent Control that used the anti-lock braking system to control the car's motion downhill.

Reflecting its SUV design, seating capacity in the Territory was for either five (two rows) or seven (three rows) passengers, making it excellent for large families with children. All seating rows were arranged in a "theatre style", whereby the first row was the lowest and the last row was the highest. The middle and back rows folded flat into the floor to maximise cargo volume.

Ford introduced the Territory alongside the existing Falcon wagon, which was built on the same Broadmeadows Assembly Plant production line. Ford Australia senior executives had expected the Falcon wagon to be discontinued soon after the introduction of the Territory, surmising that Falcon wagon sales would substantially decline as fleet buyers migrated to the Territory. However, this did not happen because the Falcon wagon retained much of its fleet sales base and the Territory appealed mainly to large families. The production of the Falcon station wagon was terminated in September 2010. The Territory was never a serious replacement for it due to higher fuel consumption and increased weight.

== History ==
Between 2004 and 2016, the Territory had been manufactured adopting the same chassis and sold in a total of five series (SX, SY, SYII, SZ, and final SZ II). The launch of the FG Falcon, however, resulted in the Territory undergoing a major redesign inside and out, and unlike the donor sedan, receiving a turbodiesel powerplant, citing high fuel consumption of the six cylinder engines due to the high kerb weight.

== Ford R7 concept ==
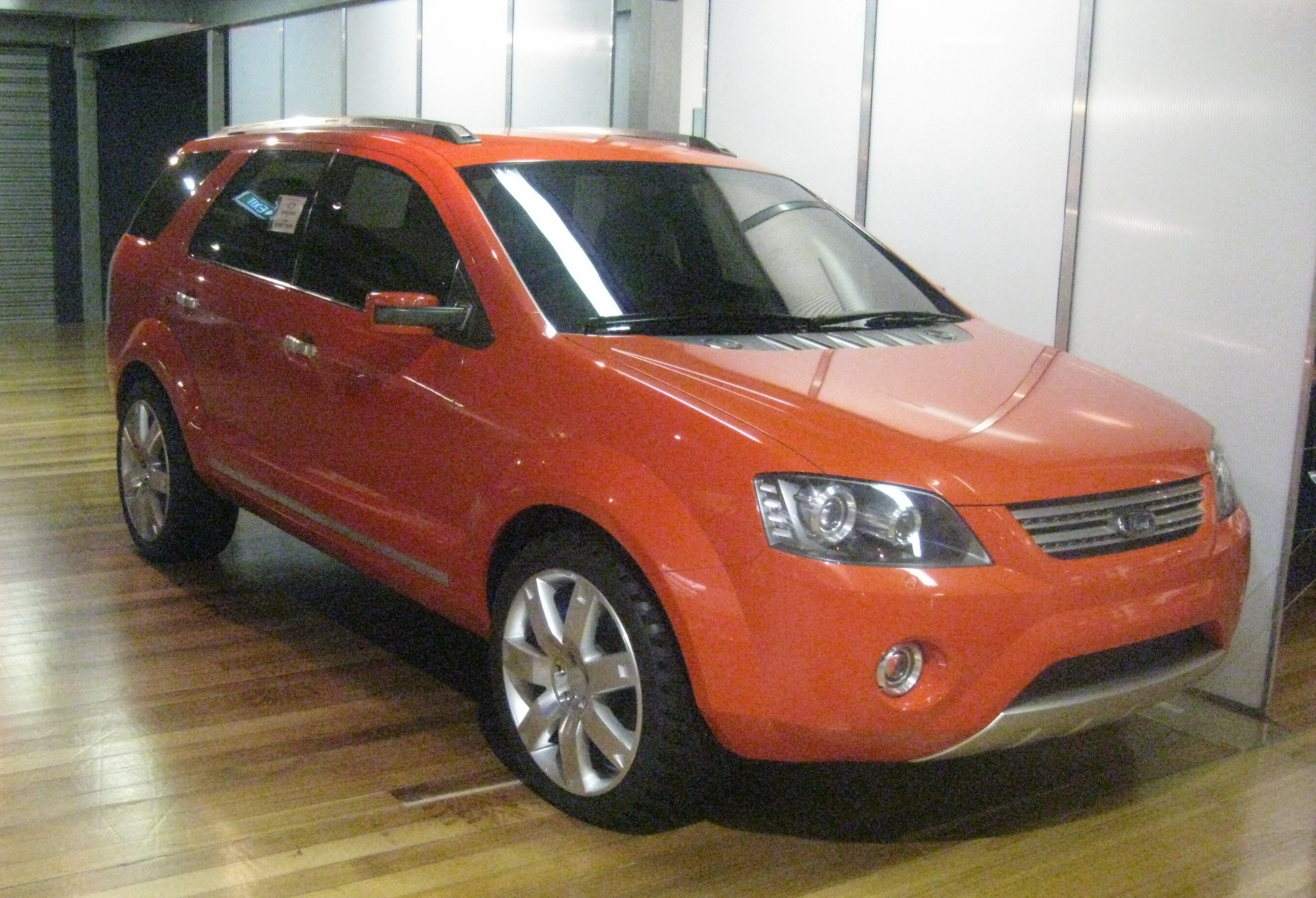
Ford R7 concept car exhibited at the former Ford Discovery Centre in Geelong, Australia

The Ford R7 was a concept SUV which was developed by Ford Australia under the leadership of the late Geoff Polites and was revealed at the 2002 Australian International Motor Show held in Melbourne. So great was the reception of the R7, that Ford fast tracked the development of the R7 into a full blown production model just two years later as the Ford Territory and it previewed the new front styling of the donor Ford Falcon (BA) range.

== First Generation (2004–2011) ==
First Generation
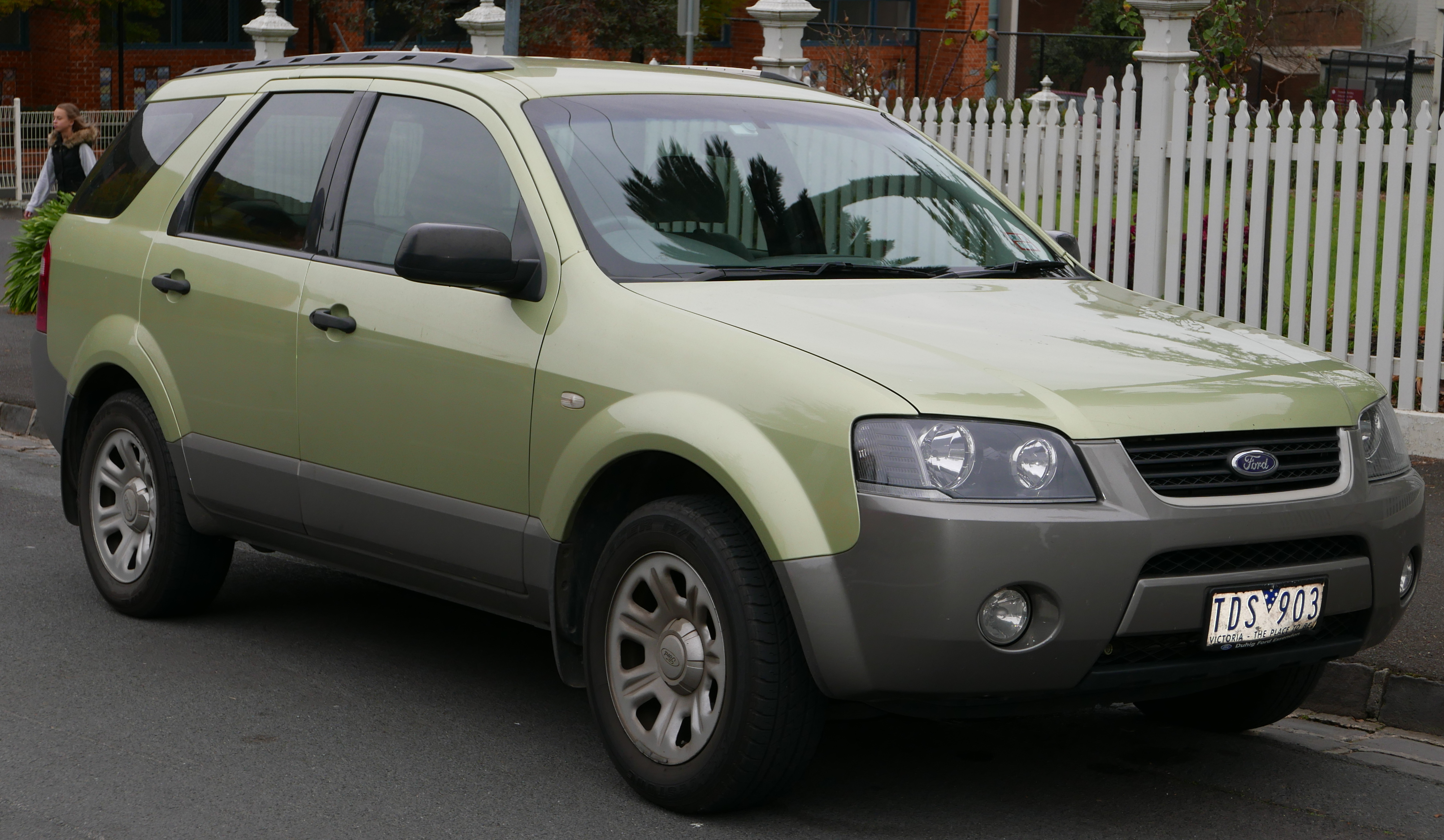
- 2004 Ford Territory (SX) TX RWD

Overview
- Manufacturer: Ford Australia
- Production: 2004–2011

Body and chassis
- Platform: Ford EA169
- Related: Ford Falcon (BA); Ford Falcon (BF)

Powertrain
- Engine: Petrol: 4.0 L Barra 182 I6 (SX); 4.0 L Barra 190 I6 (SY); 4.0 L Barra 245T turbo I6 (SY)
- Transmission: 4-speed M93LE automatic (SX; SY RWD, AWD); 6-speed 6HP 26 automatic (SY AWD)

=== SX (2004–2005) ===
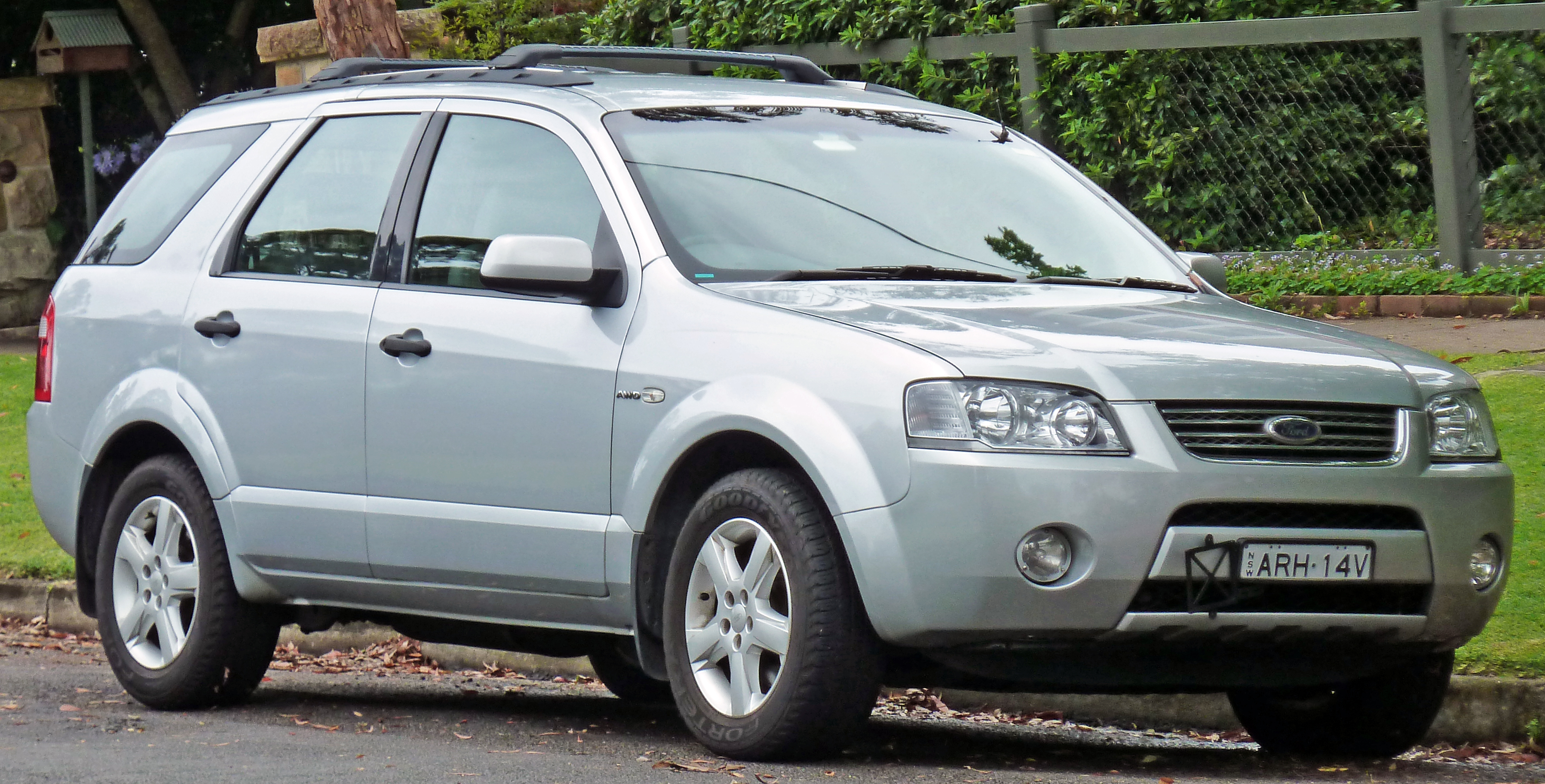
Ford Territory (SX) AWD

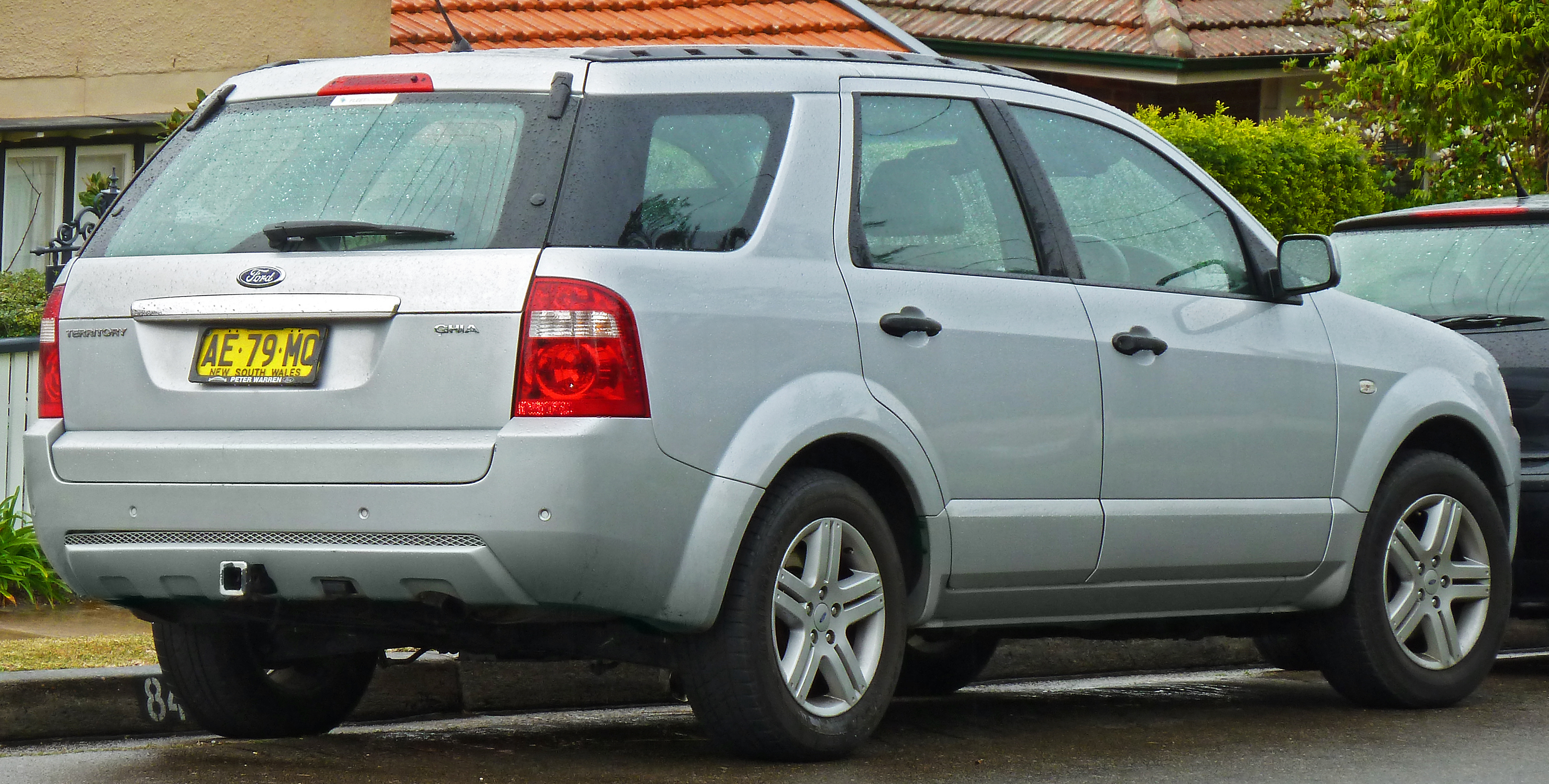
Ford Territory (SX) Ghia RWD

The first series, known as the "SX", was produced between April 2004 and September 2005.

Appearance-wise, the Territory adopted styling cues from the North American Freestyle/Taurus X, which proved to be a defining factor for the support of Ford executives at the head office in Dearborn, Michigan. Simon Butterworth, who was behind the major restyling of the Falcon that resulted in the 2002 BA series, styled the Territory. Marcus Hotblack worked on the Territory's interior, inspired by a knife. As a result, the Territory had such convenient features as flexing cup holders and a handbag holder to the side of the seat for female drivers.

The SX Territory was the first Australian-built vehicle to be fitted with an electronic stability control system. In addition, Territory was the first SUV to have won the Australian Wheels Car of the Year award, in 2004.

Its platform was available in RWD or AWD, solely powered by the 182 kW (244 hp), 380 N⋅m (280 lb⋅ft) 4.0-litre DOHC straight-six Barra petrol engine from the BA Falcon albeit slightly detuned via software, paired to a four-speed automatic gearbox. All models were renowned for very high fuel consumption, averaging between 14 and 18 L/100 km (17 and 13 mpg_{‑US}; 20 and 16 mpg_{‑imp}).

Model range

At launch, the SX range of models (and Australian retail prices) were: the TX, base package; TS, family safety package; Ghia, luxury package.

An Alpine DVD entertainment system for rear passengers, with 10.2-inch screen and infrared headphones, was offered as standard or optional depending on the model variant.

Australian and New Zealand SX series models were slightly different visually: all models sold in New Zealand had body-colour bumpers and alloy wheels, including the base model. Front light detail resembles that of women's jewellery in a black box. In New Zealand, the only RWD model was the base version and all other models had AWD; while in Australia, all models were available with both traction setups.

=== SY (2005–2011) ===
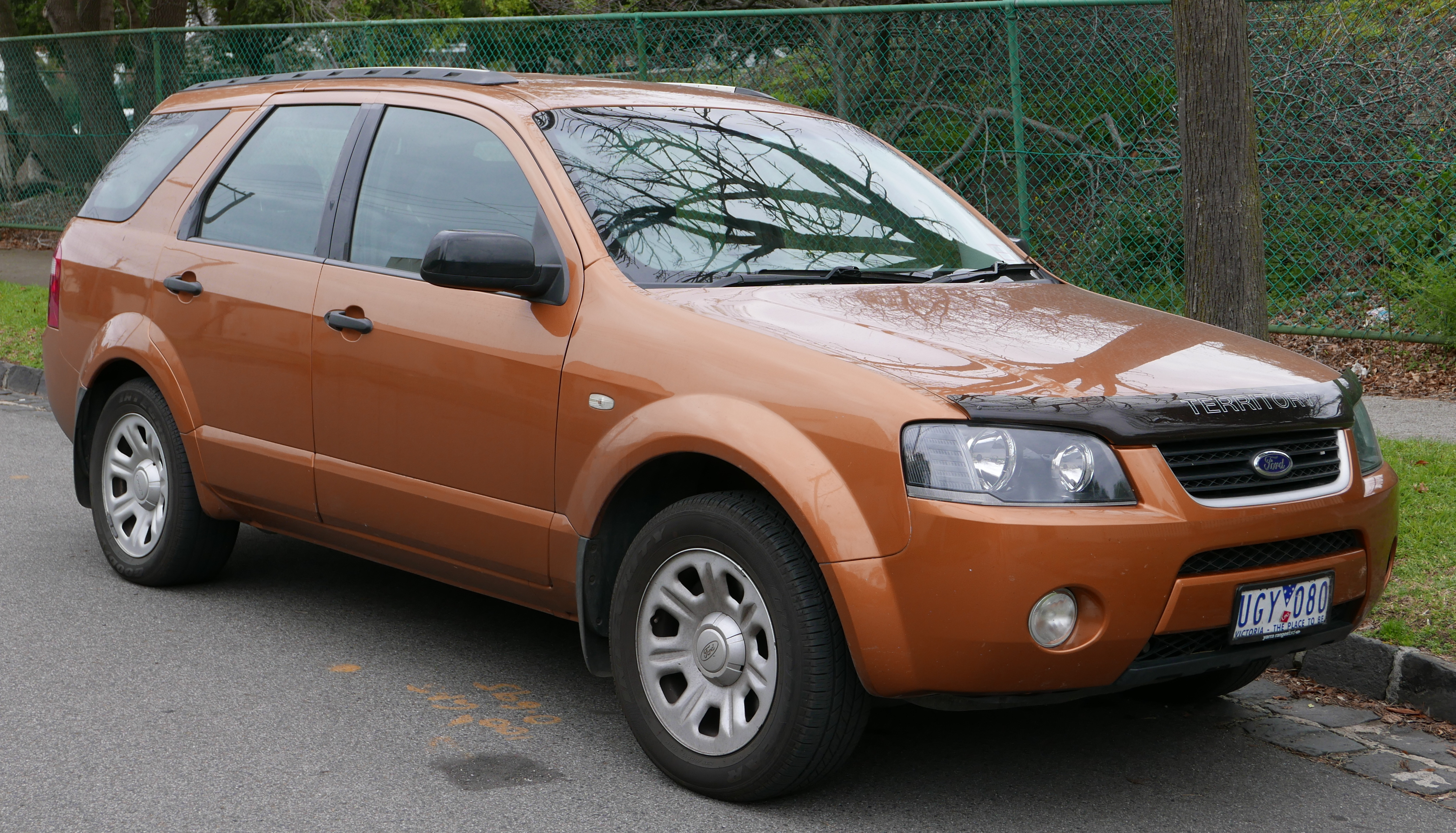
Territory TX RWD (SY)

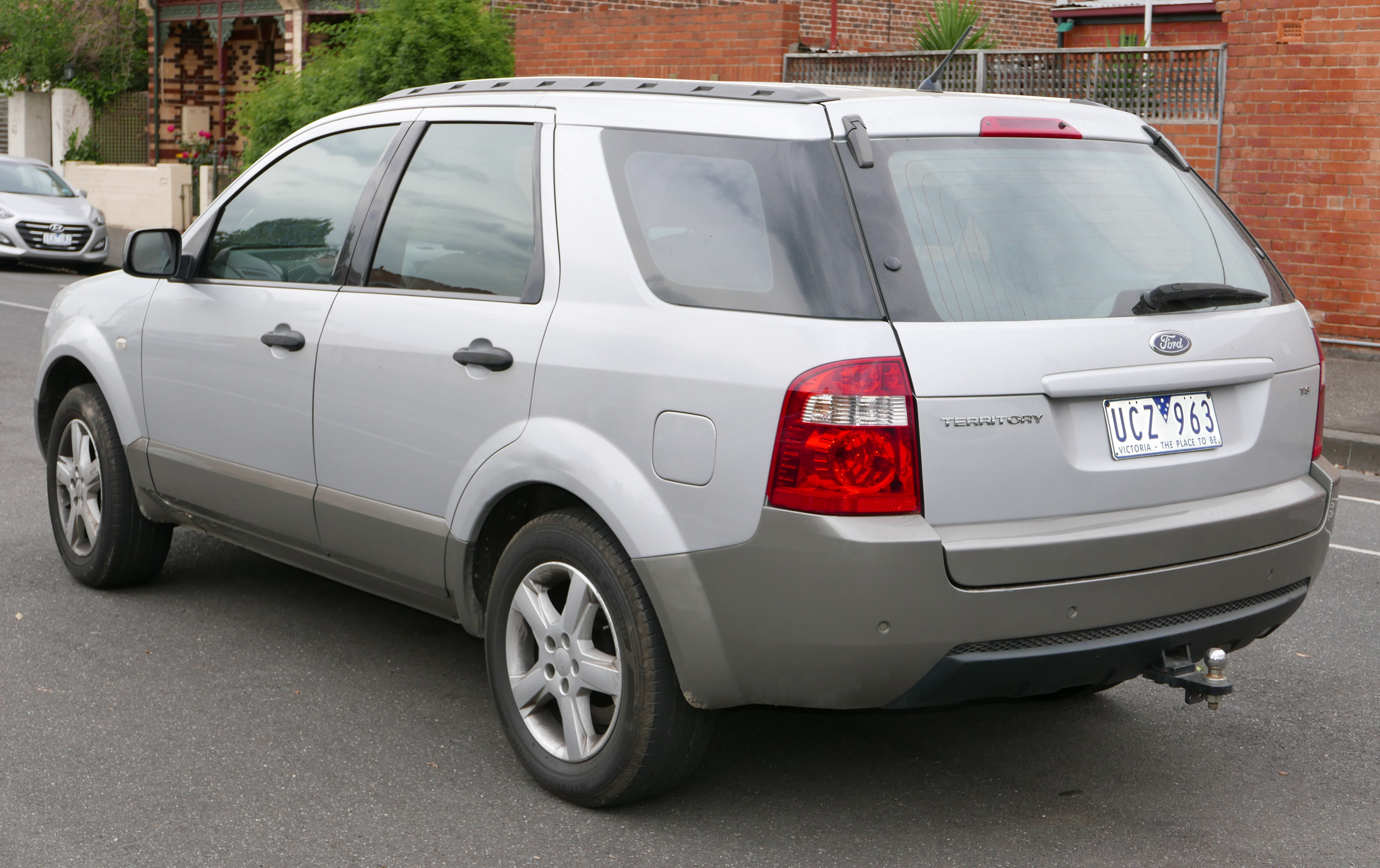
Territory TS RWD (SY)

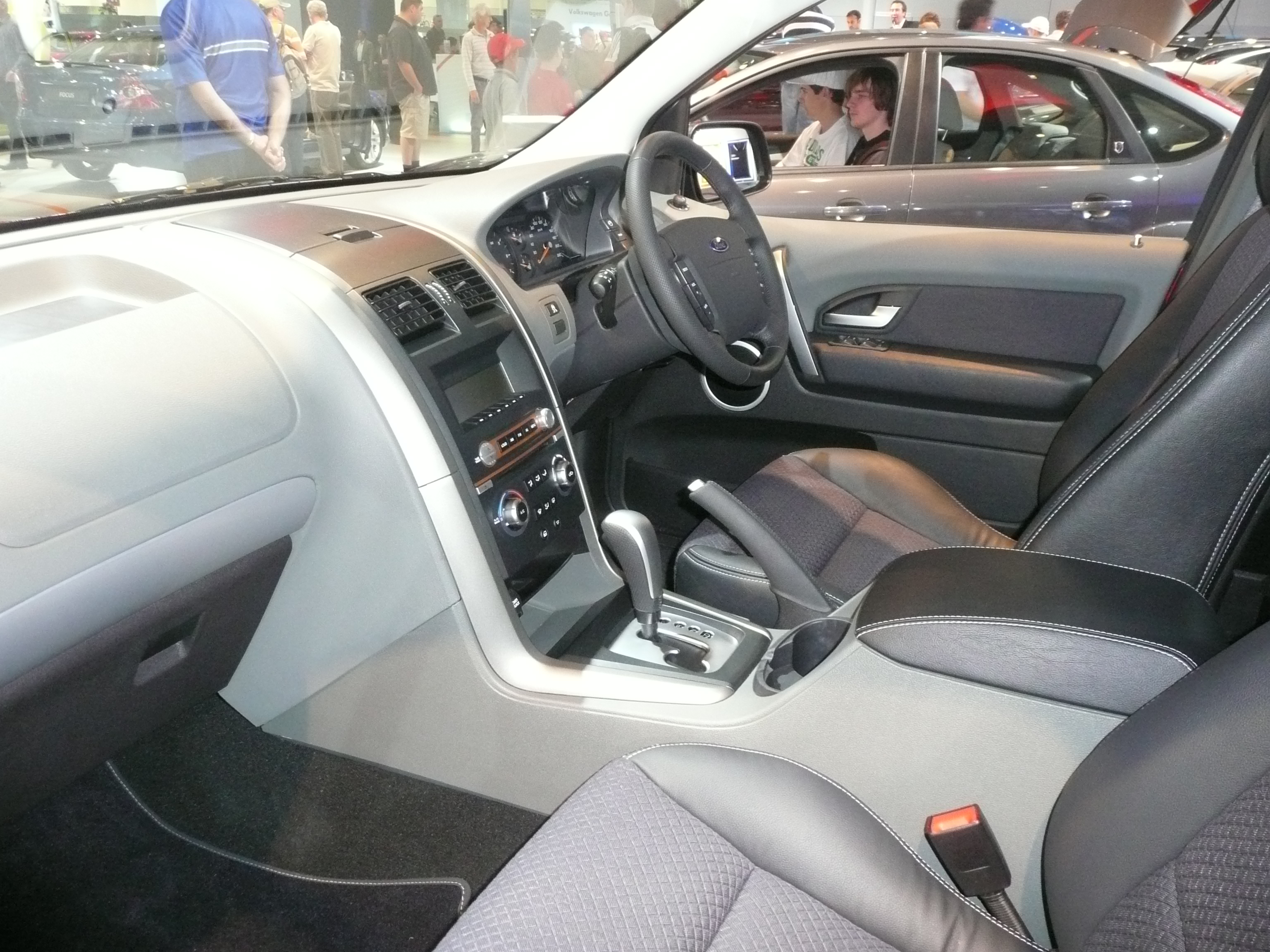
Interior (SY)

The SY, primarily a mechanical upgrade with no significant visual differentiation, was introduced in October 2005. Its key features included increased engine power 190 kW (255 hp), new automatic transmission for AWD models, and as a first for an Australian-built vehicle, a reverse parking camera (optional on the TS and standard on Ghia). The TS now featured standard reverse sensors. All models received a new key design, and on cars built after May 2006, the plastic rear cladding along the bottom edge of the rear tailgate changed to be pressed into the sheet metal.

Again, this Territory was solely powered by a revised 4.0-litre DOHC straight-six engine now producing 190 kW (255 hp) and 383 N⋅m (282 lb⋅ft). The previous DSI four-speed automatic transmission was retained with minor updates for RWD models; AWD models now featured the six-speed ZF 6HP 26 automatic transmission that contributed to slightly improved fuel consumption.

The 2006 Territory Turbo was AWD-only and its turbocharged version of the base model produced 245 kW (329 hp) and 480 N⋅m (354 lb⋅ft). Being AWD, it was only available with the then-new six-speed ZF automatic transmission.

Model range

The range remained unchanged except for the introduction, in mid-2006, of a Territory Turbo available in standard trim or luxury Ghia. It was powered by a turbocharged 4.0-litre DOHC straight-six version of the Barra engine that, due to costs considerations and the Australian market preference for performance variants, took priority over the introduction of a mooted diesel variant to curtail the high 6 cylinder fuel consumption.

At launch, the original SY range of models (and Australian retail prices) were: TX, TS, Ghia

The first Territory TX-based limited editions emerged:

- SR – released in February 2006, and re-released in June 2008
- SR2 – released in October 2008
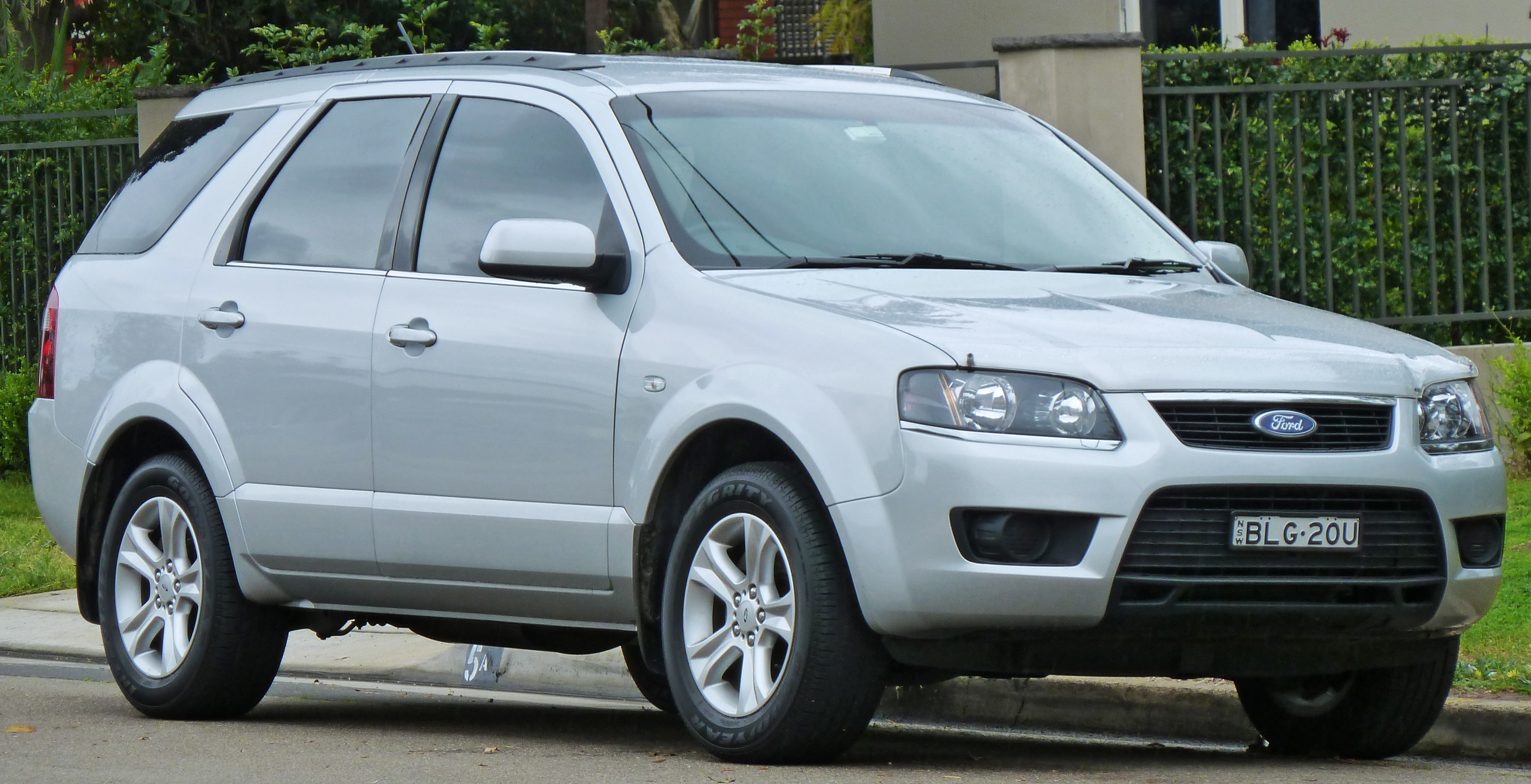
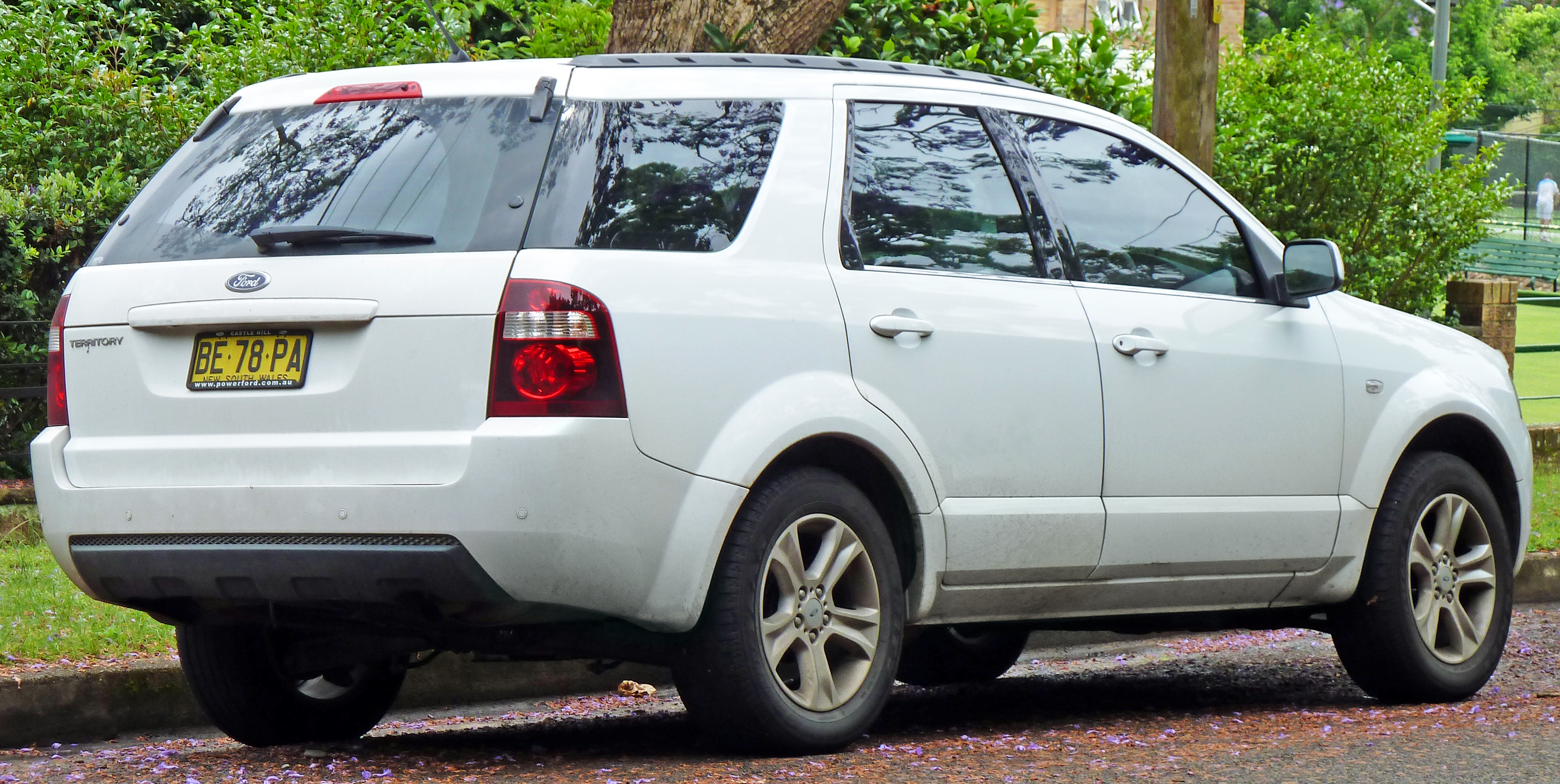
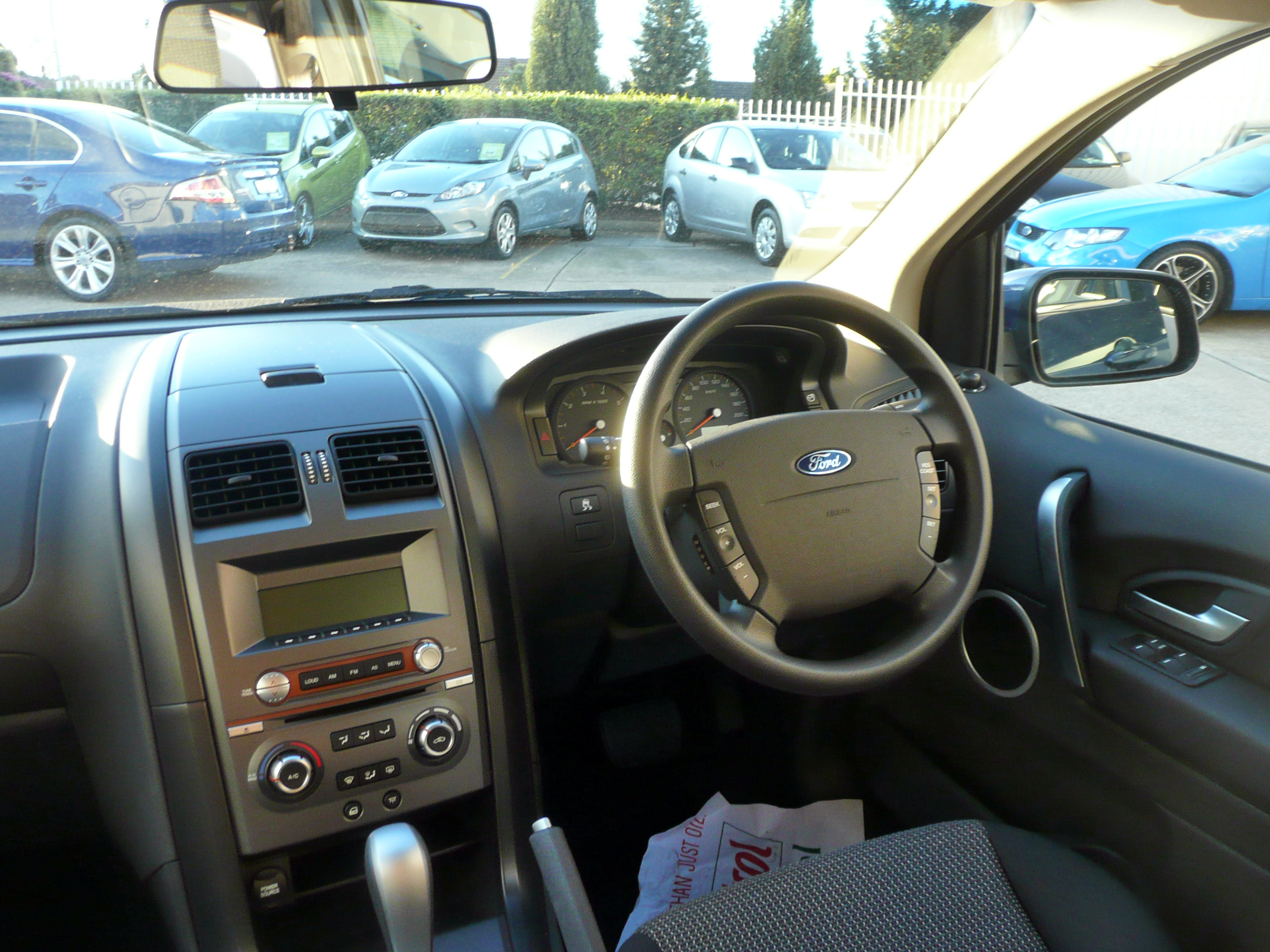
Territory TX (SY II)

The SY II series was a facelift revealed at the 2009 Australian International Motor Show held in Melbourne and went on sale that May. It featured a mildly restyled front end and other minor exterior changes, improved interior trim (with the previous upholstery colour schemes replaced by more contemporary ones) and improved suspension design. Powertrains remained unchanged, except for the axing of the 270 kW (362 hp) "FPV F6X". The BA/BF Falcon centre console and Interior Command Control (ICC) was again reused for the SY II despite the newer FG Falcon having a completely redesigned console and ICC.

The SY II received a revised front suspension to address a well-documented weakness in the front lower ball joints. Specifically, the original design had the ball joints under constant tension, which resulted in some catastrophic failures of the joint (causing the wheel to detach from the suspension and steering at high speeds) and premature wear requiring lower control arm replacements after as little as 30,000 kilometres (19,000 mi). With the new design, the lower ball joints were now under compression, thus eliminating the premature wear issue.

Model range

The SY II Territory range and upgrades (plus Australian retail prices at launch) were:

- TX: with body-coloured bumpers and alloy wheels standard
- TS: body-coloured bumpers, new alloy wheels, seven-seater with third-row standard
- Ghia: external mirrors mounted side indicators, new alloy wheels, privacy glass for the rear passenger and cargo windows

The Turbo was now available only in the latter luxury specification.

A TS Limited Edition was marketed in December 2009 and October 2010 to stimulate sales by providing Ghia-derived fittings.

Through the addition of a front passenger seatbelt warning chime implemented on cars produced from 11 January 2010, the entire Territory range qualified for a full five-star Australasian New Car Assessment Program crash test score. Models produced prior to this date only had a four-star rating.

=== Safety ===
The Ford Territory had safety features such as driver or passenger airbag, ABS, and seat belt.

ANCAP test results Ford Territory TX AWD variants (2006)
Test	Score
Overall	4 /5 stars
Frontal offset	12.57/16
Side impact	16/16
Pole	Not Assessed
Seat belt reminders	1/3
Whiplash protection	Not Assessed
Pedestrian protection	Not Assessed
Electronic stability control	Optional

ANCAP test results Ford Territory TS AWD variants (2006)
Test	Score
Overall	4 /5 stars
Frontal offset	12.57/16
Side impact	16/16
Pole	2/2
Seat belt reminders	1/3
Whiplash protection	Not Assessed
Pedestrian protection	Not Assessed
Electronic stability control	Optional

ANCAP test results Ford Territory all variants (2010)
Test	Score
Overall	5 /5 stars
Frontal offset	12.57/16
Side impact	16/16
Pole	2/2
Seat belt reminders	2/3
Whiplash protection	Not Assessed
Pedestrian protection	Not Assessed
Electronic stability control	Standard

== Second generation (2011–2016) ==
Second Generation
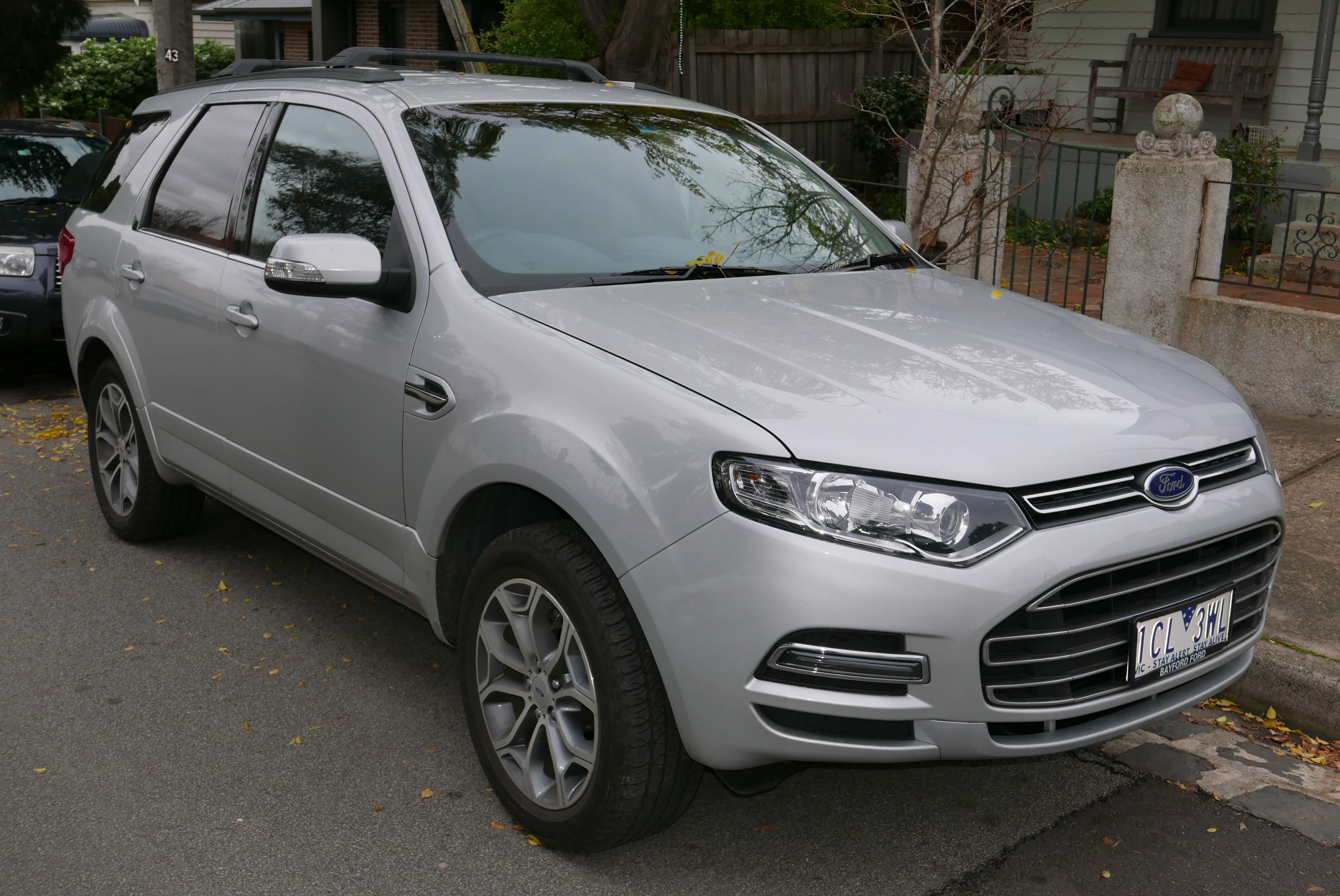
- 2014 Ford Territory (SX) Titanium RWD

Overview
- Production: 2011–2016

Body and chassis
- Platform: Ford E8
- Related: Ford Falcon (FG); Ford Falcon (FG X)

Powertrain
- Engine: Petrol: 4.0 L Barra 195 I6; Diesel: 2.7 L Lion turbo V6
- Transmission: 6-speed 6HP 21 automatic (SZ II petrol); 6-speed 6HP 26 automatic (SZ petrol); 6-speed 6R80 automatic (diesel)

=== SZ (2011–2016) ===
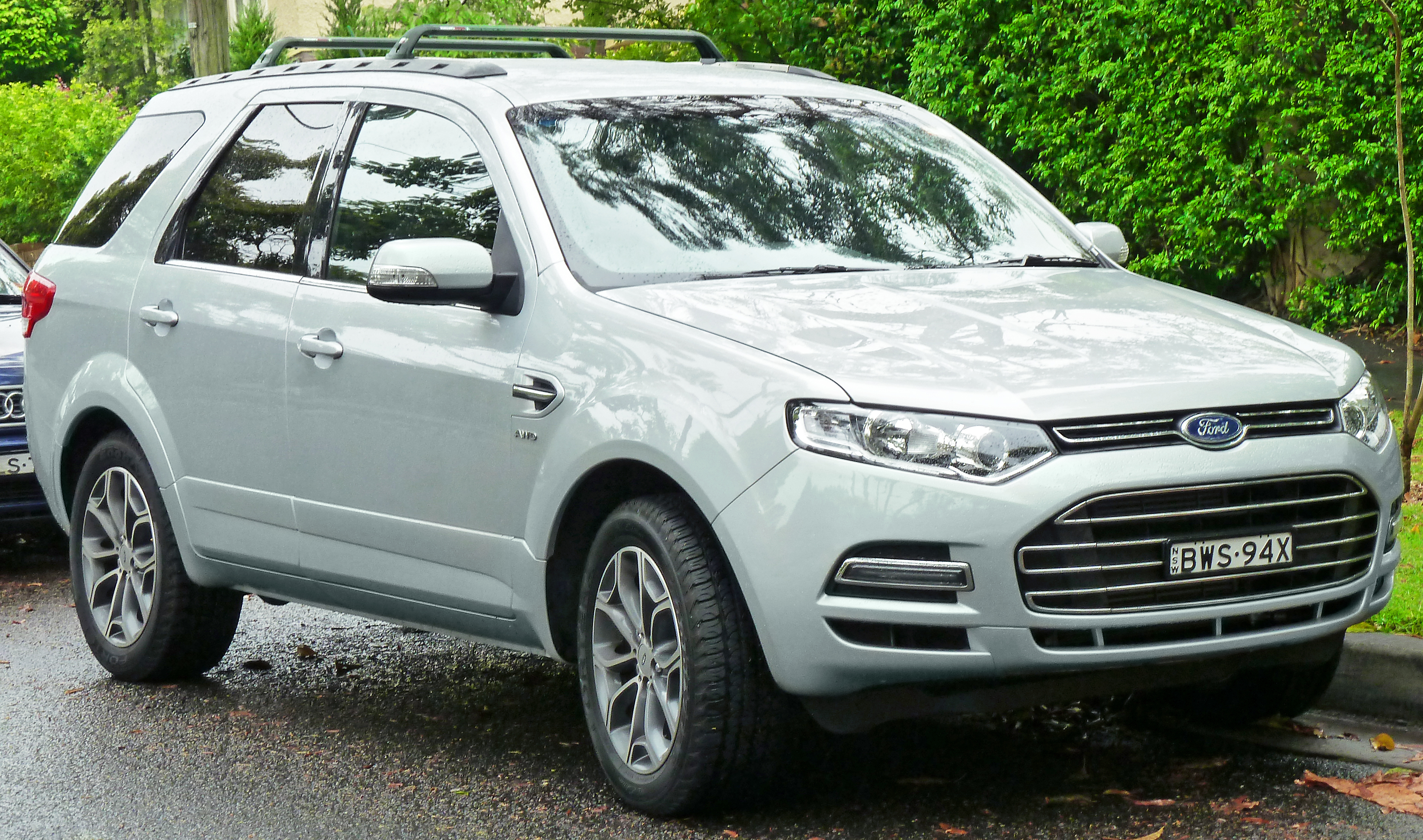
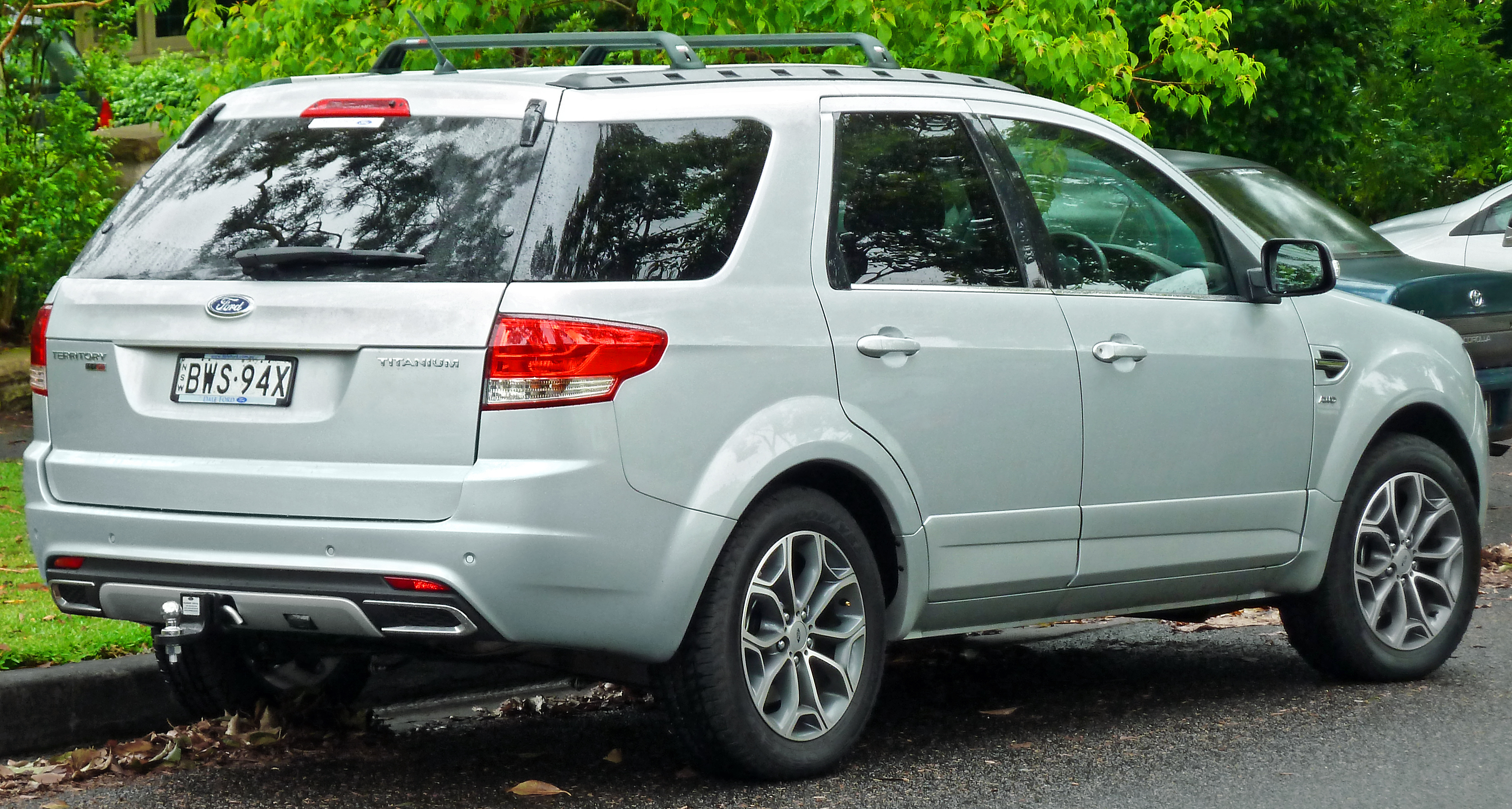
Territory Titanium RWD (SZ)

The SZ series Territory was released in April 2011. Ford Australia released official photos of this facelifted edition on 8 February 2011. Its development cost was some A$230 million. It was based on the E8 platform introduced in the FG Falcon, with the codename E265A.

In line with Ford's internationally adopted Kinetic Design, the car features a large lower air intake and thin upper grille. It has an estimated drag coefficient of Cd=0.38. Titanium models feature LED "position" lights, in lieu of the fog lights fitted on the mid-spec TS. At the rear, the car features horizontal tail lights, replacing the vertical lights on previous editions. On the inside, courtesy of the FG Falcon upgrades, the higher-range Territory models also inherited an eight-inch colour touch screen, which is central to the "SYNC" in-car entertainment and control system. New safety features include a driver's knee airbag and updated stability control system, now version 9.0 by Bosch incorporating an anti-roll-over function.

Mechanically, the SZ series introduced for the first time in Ford Australia's locally made vehicles, a diesel powerplant (whose cost and development in previous editions was postponed in favour of the turbo petrol variant of 2006). It also introduced an electric power-assist steering system used on the American Ford Mustang, which was also poised for introduction on the Falcon.

The engines range of the SZ series comprised the usual but further upgraded 4.0-litre DOHC straight-six petrol engine only for the RWD Territory, and a turbocharged, direct injection 2.7-litre 60-degree V6 diesel engine marketed as "Duratorq" for the RWD and AWD Territory models. Petrol-engined AWD models are no longer offered. The petrol engine, now compliant with Euro 4 emission standards, generates 195 kW (261 hp) and 391 N⋅m (288 lb⋅ft). At launch, the diesel engine was a seven-year-old Ford AJD-V6/PSA DT17 engine, which debuted in Australia with the Jaguar XF and Land Rover Discovery 3. It reportedly emits up to 25% less CO_{2} compared to the petrol engine.

Across the range, two types of six-speed automatic transmission became default depending on model variants. For petrol-engined RWD—the ZF 6HP26 transmission; for diesel-engined RWD and AWD the ZF-based, 6R80 transmission produced by Ford in the United States is used.

Interior-wise, finally the new Territory gained the centre console and ICC of the FG Falcon. Up until this time the Territory had continued to reused the 2002–2008 BA/BF Falcon interior and ICC.

Model range

The range remained the same except for the Titanium replacing the Ghia, reflecting a similar changes made to the related Ford Falcon (FG) range.

The SZ range and key features or upgrades (plus Australian retail prices at launch) were as follows:

- TX: 17-inch alloy wheels, iPod/USB integration, Bluetooth phone connectivity and cruise control). Available in RWD petrol, diesel, and AWD diesel
- TS: as above but with 18-inch alloy wheels plus four-way power adjustable driver seat, 8-inch colour touch screen, front fog lights, dual-zone climate control, premium audio system and reversing camera, standard 7-seat capacity. Available in RWD petrol, diesel, and AWD diesel
- Titanium: as above plus different 18-inch alloy wheels, LED "position" lights, external mirrors mounted side indicators, chrome detachable front grille, 6-way power adjustable driver seat with three memory settings, glass for the rear passenger and cargo windows, auto-dimming rear-view mirror, satellite navigation with Traffic Message Channel, Alpine DVD entertainment system for rear passengers with 10.2-inch screen and infrared headphones, leather seat trim (in "Shadow" black or "Cashmere" beige). Available in RWD petrol, diesel, and AWD diesel

The Titanium model has proven to be the most popular variant and the SZ series led Ford Australia to reach a significant manufacturing milestone by building 150,000th Territory (a white TX TDCi RWD model) in 2012.

The Titanium (in AWD 2.7-Litre TDCi specification) was also the only variant for exports to Thailand that resumed in late 2012.

A TX Limited Edition was marketed in August 2012 to stimulate sales by providing TS-derived fittings.

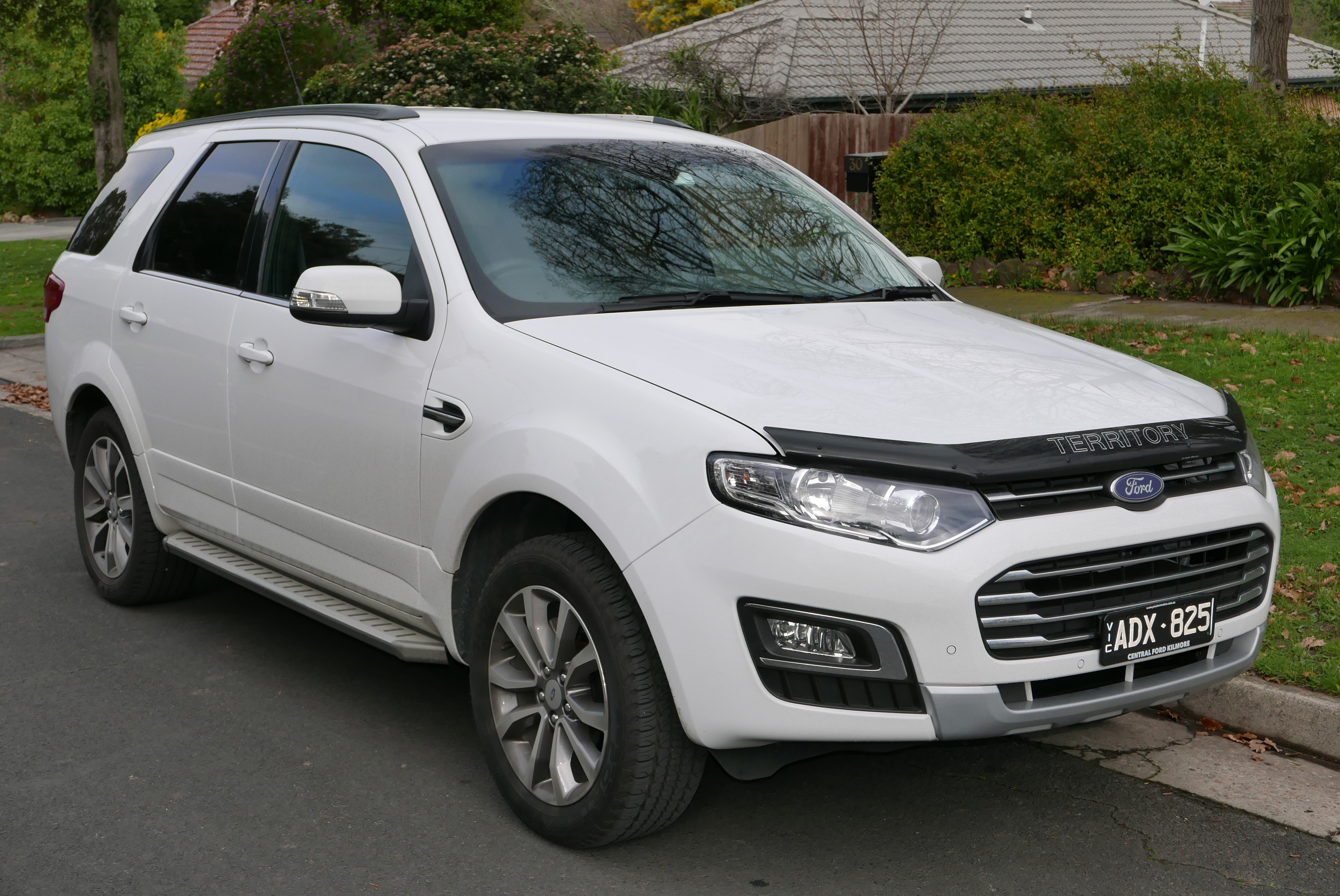

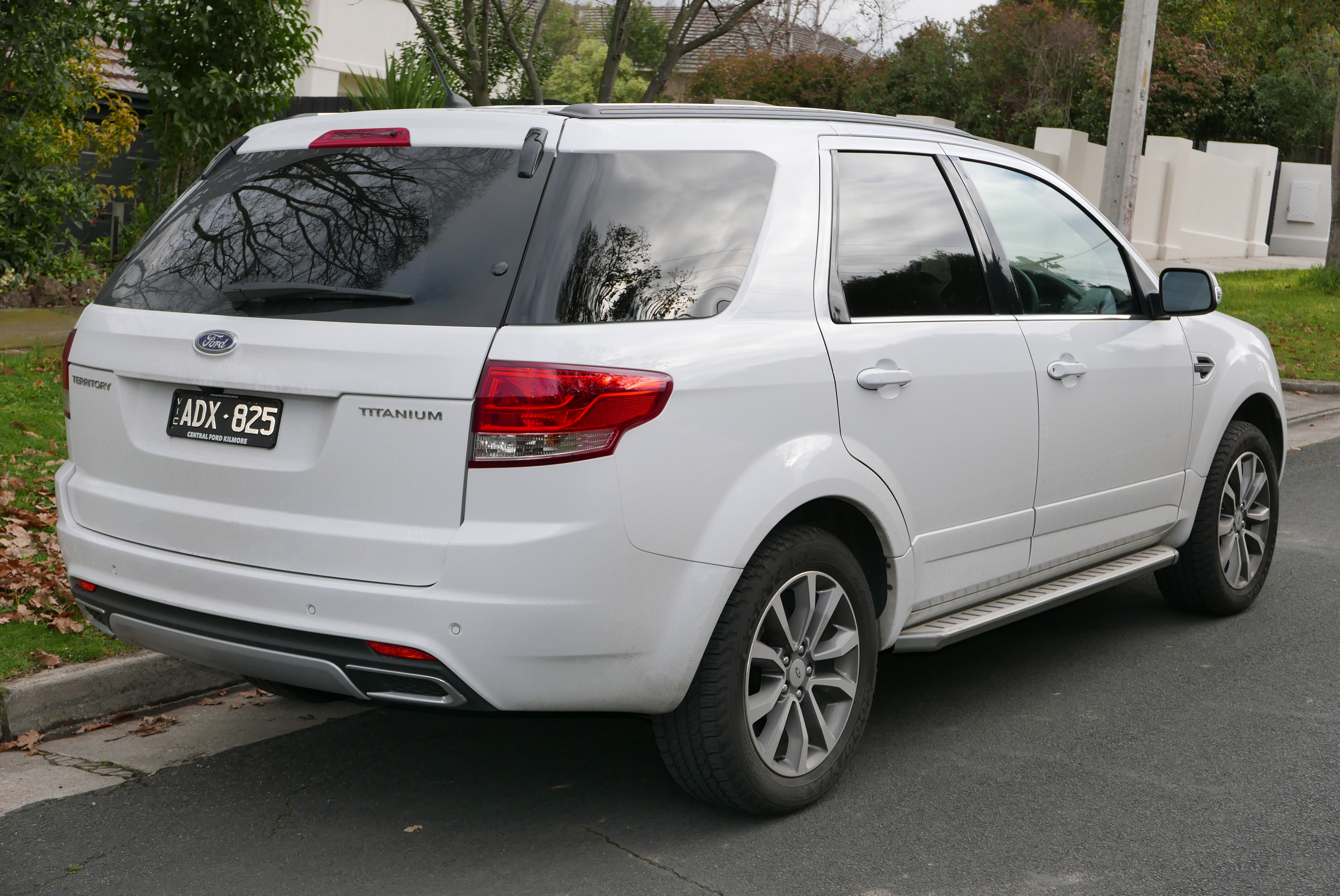
Territory Titanium RWD (SZ II)

After 10 years of production, the SZ II series represented the Territory before Ford Australia's full production (which also included the FG X Falcon sedan) ceased in October 2016.

The SZ II began production alongside the FG X Falcon on 20 October 2014 and went on sale in the Australian market in December 2014. Its model range remains unchanged relative to the SZ series but, externally, it features subtle styling revisions consisting of a new fascia and alloy wheels, with the Territory losing out its LED "position lights" in favour of more traditional foglights. Mechanically, the engine range also remains unchanged apart from transmission tweaks and aerodynamic improvements that deliver around 0.5% better fuel consumption. Inside, new trims colours feature along with an updated "SYNC2" touchscreen in-car entertainment and control system with voice command, Wi-Fi connectivity, DAB+ radio, and emergency call functionality.

=== Safety ===
ANCAP test results Ford Territory all variants (2011)
Test	Score
Overall	5 /5 stars
Frontal offset	12.57/16
Side impact	16/16
Pole	2/2
Seat belt reminders	2/3
Whiplash protection	Not Assessed
Pedestrian protection	Adequate
Electronic stability control	Standard

ANCAP test results Ford Territory all variants (2014)
Test	Score
Overall	5 /5 stars
Frontal offset	12.57/16
Side impact	16/16
Pole	2/2
Seat belt reminders	2/3
Whiplash protection	Good
Pedestrian protection	Adequate
Electronic stability control	Standard

== FPV F6X ==
FPV F6X
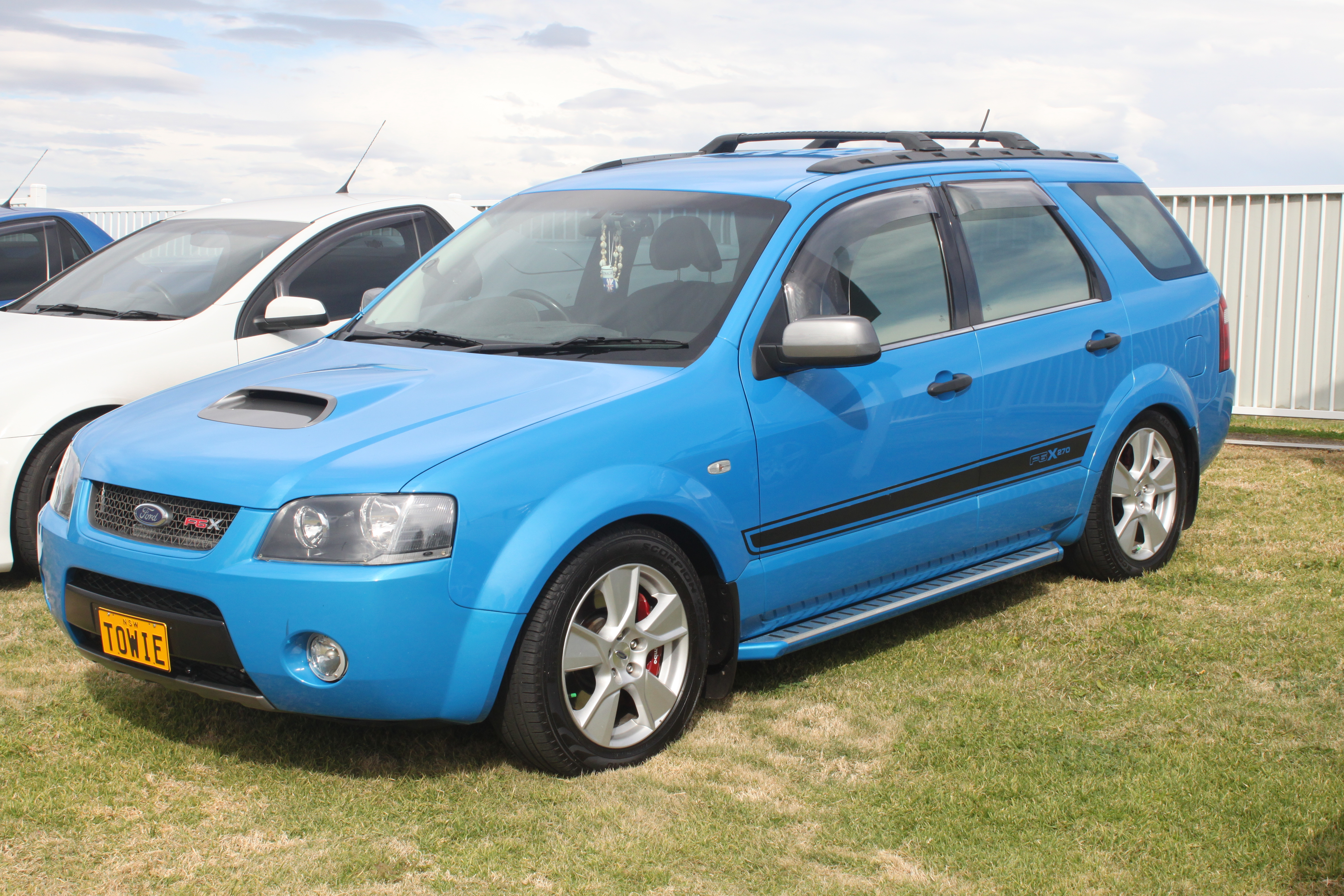
- FPV F6X AWD (SY)

Overview
- Manufacturer: Ford Performance Vehicles
- Production: 2008–2009

Body and chassis
- Layout: Front-engine, all-wheel-drive

Powertrain
- Engine: Petrol: 4.0 L Barra 270T turbo I6
- Transmission: 6-speed automatic

Dimensions
- Wheelbase: 2,842 mm (111.9 in)
- Length: 4,856 mm (191.2 in)
- Width: 1,898 mm (74.7 in)
- Height: 1,714 mm (67.5 in)
- Kerb weight: 2,155 kg (4,751 lb)

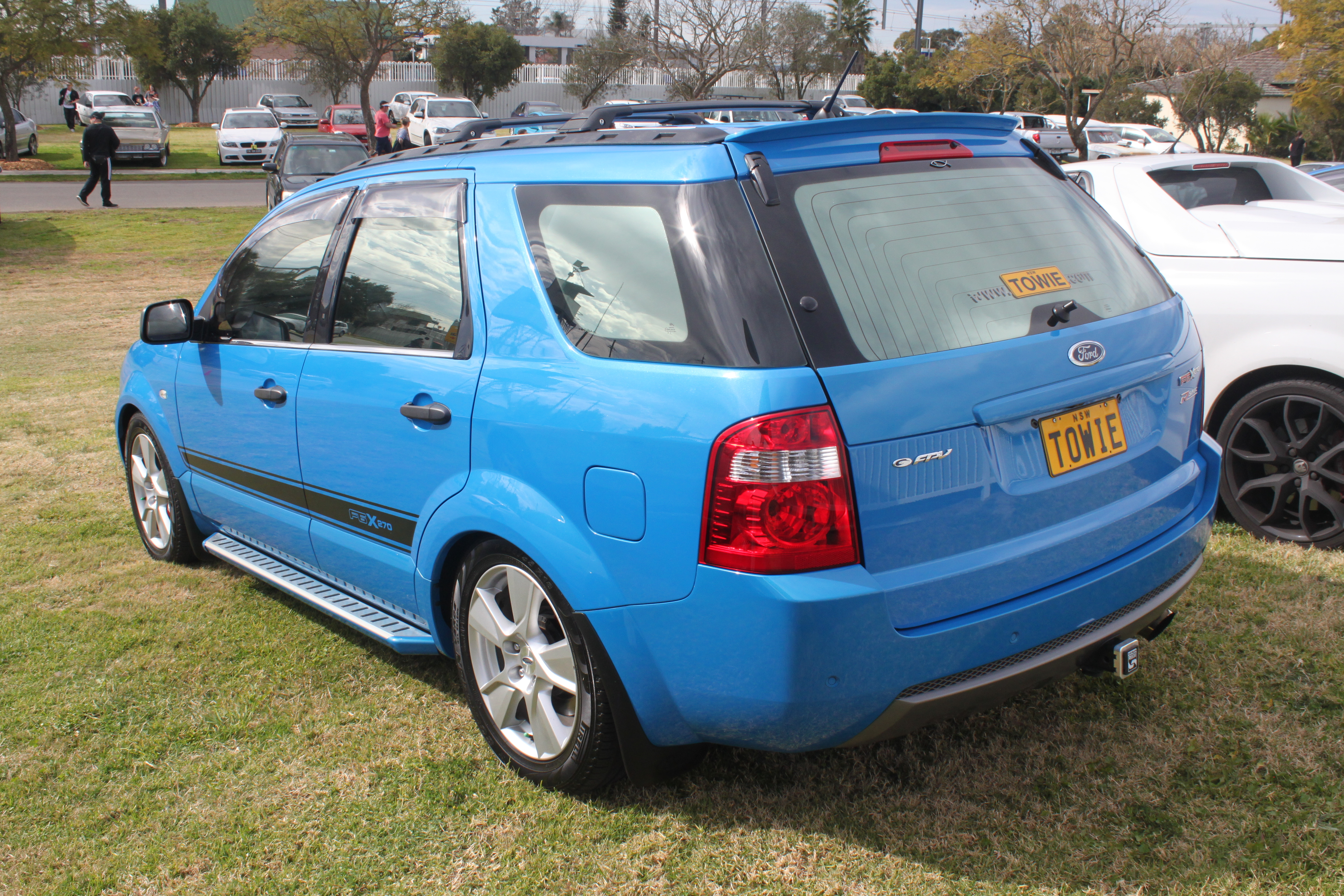
FPV F6X AWD (SY) rear

The FPV F6X is a performance-oriented SUV based on the SY Territory, Ford Performance Vehicles (FPV) launched it on 29 February 2008, it was the first and only non-Falcon vehicle sold by FPV.

Effectively a high-performance version of the Territory Turbo, it was only available in AWD and with a six-speed automatic transmission. It was badged "F6X 270" due to its engine output of 270 kW (362 hp) and 550 N⋅m (406 lb⋅ft), shared with the similarly engined and Falcon-based FPV F6 sedan. This resulted in this SUV being the most powerful SUV available at the time, with a fast 0–100 kilometres per hour (0–62 mph) acceleration time of 5.9 seconds.

FPV foreshadowed its intention to enter the SUV scene with the "P-SUV" concept car displayed at its Open Day in February 2007. This vehicle featured a pick-up body style and aggressive off-road styling. The final F6X concept was otherwise displayed at the October 2007 Australian International Motor Show in Sydney.

Aside from its high-performance engine, its other key features included 18-inch wheels, upgraded front Brembo brakes, and fittings such as seating (optional third row seat) and instrumentation styled to mirror those of the FPV sedans. Despite this, the lack of sufficient external differentiation with the donor Territory Turbo, its high price of A$75,990 and poor fuel consumption translated into a low sales success, with a total of 251 units built. As a consequence, production ceased in February 2009 and it was no longer available with the SY II series launched in June 2009.

It also featured datadot paint technology.

== Exports ==
=== New Zealand ===
The Territory was sold in New Zealand, with 12,000 units sold there.

=== South Africa ===
Exports to South Africa were made in 2005. Sales of the Territory began on June 22, 2005. The TX and Ghia AWD/RWD models were sold there. Prior to its debut, a Territory was sent to South Africa in 2004 for assessment by Ford's South African branch.

Around 2,300 units were exported.

=== Thailand ===
Exports of the Territory to Thailand was announced to go on sale in April 2006 with the Ghia 4WD model. Prior to that, the SY Territory appeared at the 2005 Bangkok Motor Show. A Thailand-Australia Free Trade Agreement was also in place at the time the exports started after 2005.

Around 100 units were sold to Thailand in August 2012 after Ford Australia showed interest in a diesel-powered version at the 2012 Bangkok Motor Show held in March 2012.

Concerns were raised that the Thai export program Ford Australia participated in could collapse due to high taxes imposed on imported vehicles. This was pointed out in 2013 after taxes were raised that it was expensive to purchase a Territory.

== Sales ==
Calendar year	Australian sales
2004	13,583
2005	23,454
2006	18,364
2007	17,290
2008	12,882
2009	10,884
2010	11,558
2011	13,866
2012	14,646
2013	14,261
2014	9,828
2015	8,902
2016	6,928
2017	1,764
2018	4
Total	178,214
