= Geoff Polites =

Australian automotive executive

Geoffrey Paul Polites (5 November 1947 – 20 April 2008) was an Australian automotive executive. He was notable for being the chief executive officer of Jaguar Land Rover and the president of Ford Australia.

== Early life and education ==
Polites was born in Melbourne, and educated at Cheltenham High School, before going on to study economics at Monash University, graduating with first class honours.

== Career ==
=== Ford ===
He joined Ford Australia in 1970 as a product planner and after two years, he joined the company's graduate training program in the United States, working in product planning and marketing plans before moving to Europe for further development in product planning.

In 1975 he was appointed marketing plans and research manager at Ford Australia. Two years later he became southern region country sales manager before returning to head office in 1979 as merchandising manager. He moved to Sydney in 1981 as eastern regional manager then returned again to head office in 1985 to become general sales manager.

=== City Ford ===
In July 1988, he took an unusual career move by resigning from Ford, to become the dealer principal of City Ford Dealership in central Sydney spending 11 years selling the products to customers against stiff opposition from Japanese imports. As a Ford dealer, he was named Ford Australia's Dealer of the Year on three occasions, and also won the coveted Ford President's Award three times. He also served on the Ford National Dealer Council for five years, and was the Council chairman in 1998.

=== Ford Australia ===
Following a phone call from future Ford CEO Jacques Nasser, he sold his interests in City Ford in 1999 and became president of Ford Australia where he shook things up, scrapping executive perks such as in-house executive lunches, car washes and refuelling service. He was responsible for getting Ford Australia back into motor racing and performance cars, including the highly regarded Falcon Turbo. He was personally involved in recruiting Holden V8 racing star Craig Lowndes, who defected to Ford in 2001. Under his tenure, he oversaw the revamping of the Ford Falcon range with the introduction of the 2002 Falcon (BA) which included the Falcon Turbo. He also personally championed the development of the Ford Territory softroader where in 2000, Polites travelled to Detroit with a scale model of the vehicle. From his time as a dealer, he saw a market for a vehicle with the roominess of a four-wheel-drive but which drove like a car. He did not come up with the idea but he asked for and got $500 million to fund the project at a time when Ford globally was rapidly losing money.

=== Ford of Europe ===
His efforts in Australia were recognised by Ford, who reassigned him to Ford of Europe in Cologne in April 2004, first as vice-president, European Sales Staff before becoming the vice-president of marketing, sales and service in October 2004, reporting to Lewis Booth, chairman and CEO of Ford of Europe.

=== Jaguar Land Rover ===
In September 2005, Polites was appointed CEO of Jaguar and Land Rover, reporting to Mark Fields, executive vice-president, Premier Automotive Group, a move he described as "a complete shock". He was tasked to turn around the operations, both of which had been unprofitable for many years. This included integrating their British manufacturing and back office operations as well as overseeing launches of new models such as the 2005 Range Rover Sport, 2006 Jaguar XK, 2006 Land Rover Freelander, and 2008 Jaguar XF. Under his leadership the combined JLR business returned to profit culminating in the sale of the marques to Tata Motors. He had intended to stay on with Jaguar Land Rover under Tata ownership.

== Death ==
Having battled bowel cancer for two years, Polites died in April 2008 on a visit to Australia. He had hoped to see the birth of his first grandchild but his health deteriorated rapidly, preventing that.

At the time, his contemporaries paid tribute to him:

Geoff's untimely passing robs his family and friends of a man who was a real inspiration to us all. His drive and determination, combined with his clear sense of vision for the business, played a huge role in turning round the business at Jaguar Land Rover and returning it to profitability. Geoff ensured that Jaguar Land Rover was not distracted and continued to focus on the fundamentals of the business during the recent sale process, despite at the time also fighting his own personal health battle. He was a trusted colleague and someone who was much respected not just by his peers but by all who had the privilege to work with him.

– Alan Mulally, President and CEO, Ford Motor Company

For many of us at Ford and Jaguar Land Rover, we've lost not just a respected colleague but a great friend. Geoff was always someone to look up to throughout his almost 40-year career in the automotive industry. His passion for the car business was legend, but the resolve he showed since taking over as CEO of Jaguar Land Rover in 2005 was something very special. His leadership of the team that has put the Jaguar Land Rover business back into profitability has been exceptional. Geoff has given Jaguar Land Rover the solid foundation and established the strong management team it needs for a successful future.

– Lewis Booth, Executive Vice-President, Ford Motor Company; Chairman and CEO, Ford of Europe and Premier Automotive Group

== Personal life ==
Australian Rules Football was a passion and in his spare time, Polites was a leading umpire, officiating in 39 senior Victorian Football League matches from 1976–1979. At one stage he was mentioned as a possible CEO of the AFL – and the Sydney Swans were a passion. For 12 years before he left Sydney, he had been a runner, selector and assistant coach at the Swans.

Polites was a fan of the band AC/DC, French singer Charles Trenet, and identified Winston Churchill, George Patton, Erwin Rommel, and John Walker as heroes.

He was married with two sons, and was fond of his Maltese Shih Tzu named Don. He had a brother, Colin, a lawyer and presidential member of the Australian Industrial Relations Commission, who also succumbed to bowel cancer in 2003, at 57.
