= Ford Barra engine =

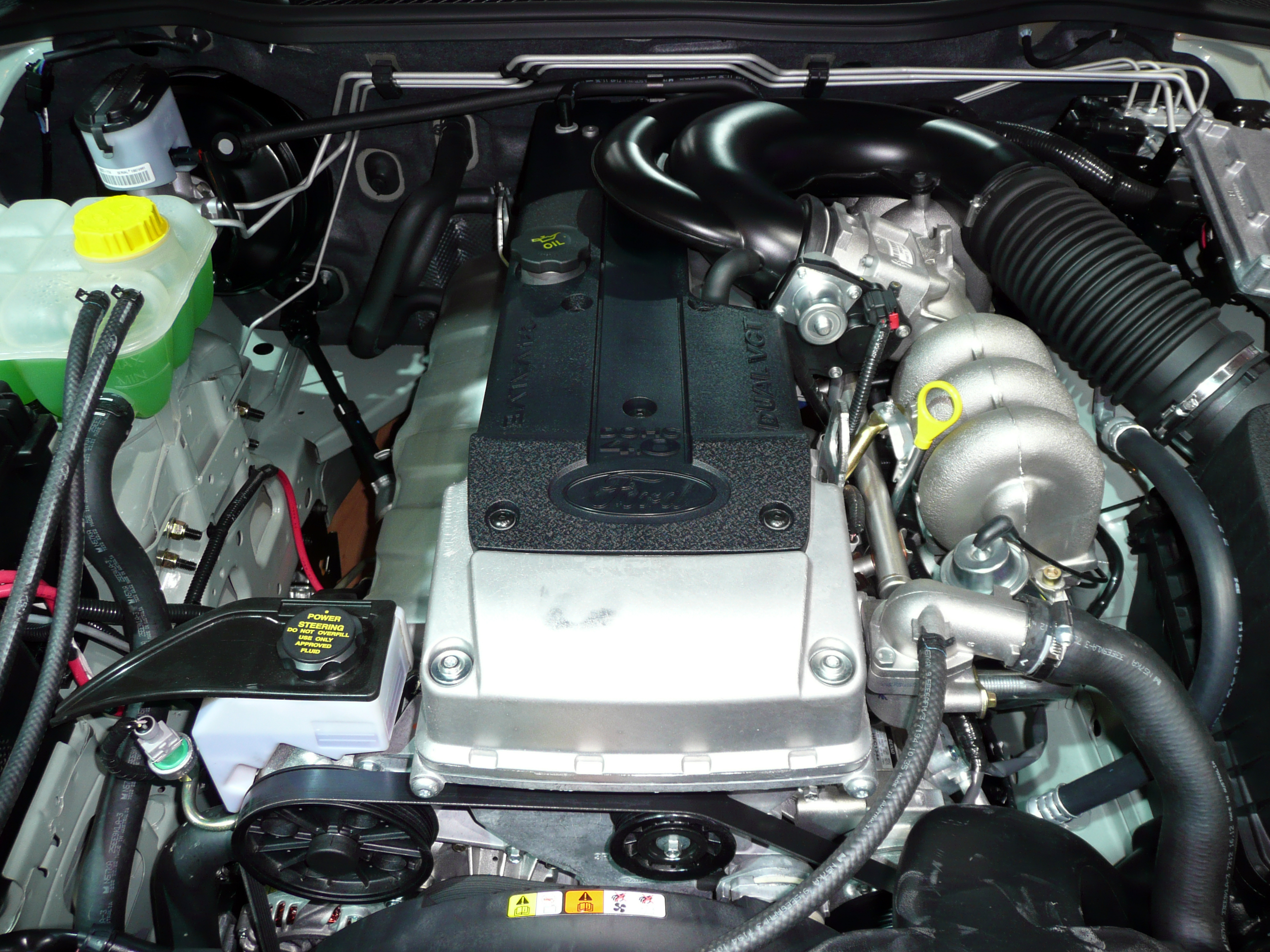
Barra 190 I6 in a Ford Fairmont Ghia (BF II)

Barra is a series of internal combustion engines manufactured by Ford Australia between 2002 and 2016. Barra engines comprise locally-developed and produced inline-six engines (I6s) and Canadian-produced V8 engines.

The Barra inline-six was developed by Ford Australia and built in Geelong, Victoria. It is a descendant of the original Falcon Six from 1960. It was utilised by the Australian manufactured Ford Falcon and Territory, first introduced in the Ford Falcon (BA) in 2002, continuing production until 26 September 2016, coinciding with the end of production of the Falcon and Territory on 7 October. It was produced in versions running on petrol, with a turbocharged variant, and liquefied petroleum gas.

The Barra V8s are versions of the Ford Modular engine, built at the Essex Engine Plant in Windsor, Ontario. It was introduced in 2002 with the BA Falcon and were discontinued with the release of the Ford Falcon (FG) in 2008.

== Inline 6 ==
Ford Barra inline-six
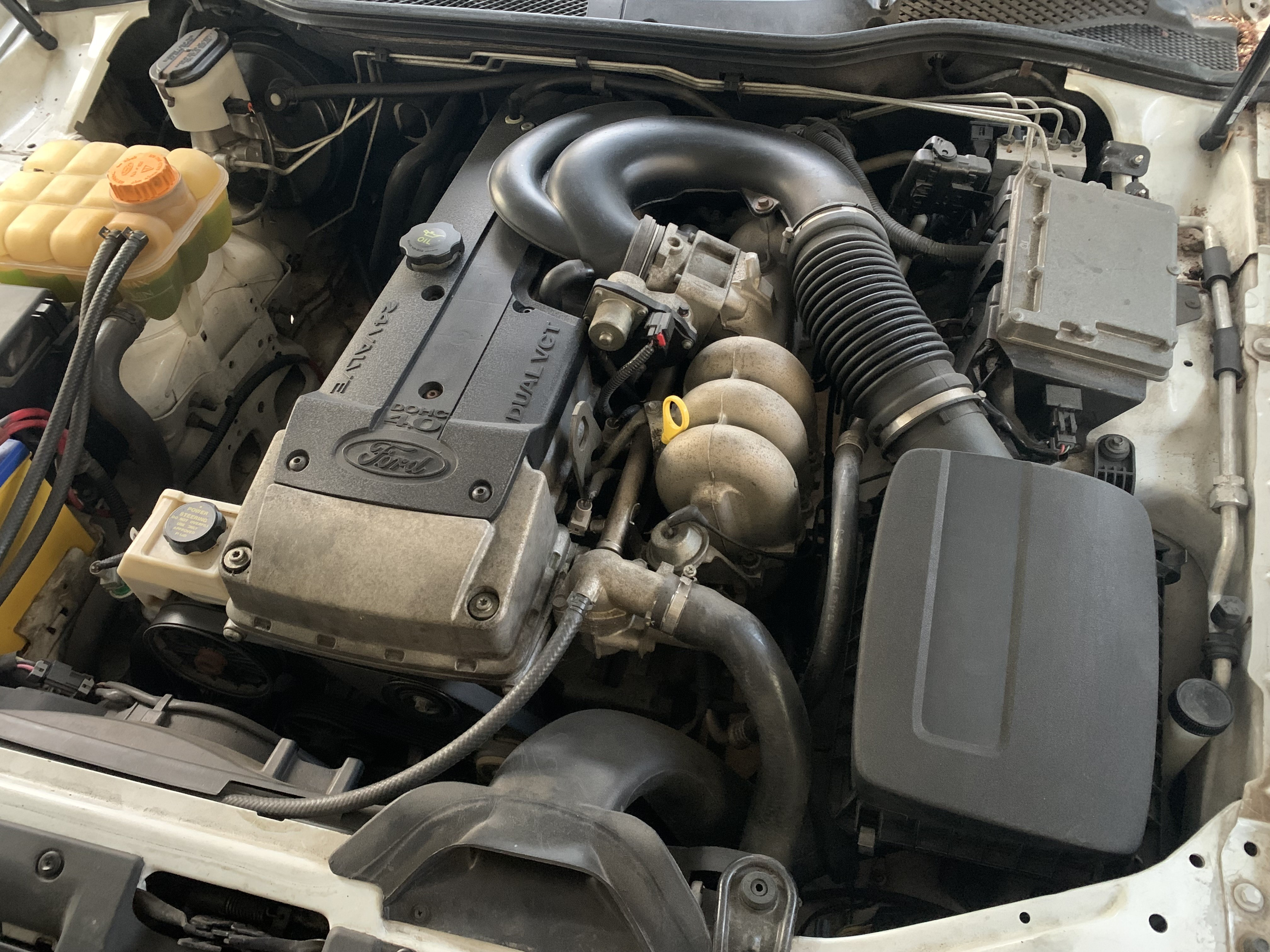
- Barra 190 in a Ford Falcon (BF)

Layout
- Displacement: 3,984 cc (243.1 cu in)
- Cylinder bore: 92.26 mm (3.632 in)
- Piston stroke: 99.31 mm (3.910 in)
- Cylinder block material: Cast iron
- Cylinder head material: Aluminium
- Valvetrain: DOHC 4 valves per cyl with VCT
- Valvetrain drive system: Timing Chain
- Compression ratio: 8.47:1 – 12.0:1

Combustion
- Fuel system: Multi-port fuel injection
- Fuel type: Unleaded; Autogas
- Oil system: Wet sump
- Cooling system: Water-cooled

Output
- Power output: 156–198 kW (209–266 hp) (autogas) 182–195 kW (244–261 hp) (petrol) 240–325 kW (322–436 hp) (turbocharged petrol)
- Torque output: 374–409 N⋅m (276–302 lb⋅ft) (autogas) 380–391 N⋅m (280–288 lb⋅ft) (petrol) 450–576 N⋅m (332–425 lb⋅ft) (turbocharged petrol)

The Barra inline-six engine was built by Ford Australia at their Geelong, Victoria engine plant. It has an engine displacement of 4.0-litres, dual overhead camshafts (DOHC), variable valve timing (VVT), variable camshaft timing (VCT), and contained 24 valves. It first debuted in 2002, with the BA Falcon. It was used in the Australian manufactured Ford Territory, Falcon, Fairmont and Fairlane. The Barra engine ended production 26 September 2016, coinciding with the end of production of the Falcon and Territory on 7 October.

It is a development of the single overhead camshaft (SOHC) Intech produced from 1998 to 2002, ultimately derived from the 2.4-litre Thriftpower Six from the original 1960 American Ford Falcon.

The autogas engines had green valve covers, FPV engines blue covers, and the turbocharged engines had red covers—excluding the Territory Turbo and FG X, which were black.

=== Petrol ===
==== Barra 182 ====
The Barra 182 was released in 2002, and was standard in the BA Falcon, Fairmont, and Fairlane. It was the standard engine in the SX Territory when it released in 2004. It was more powerful, had more torque, was six percent more efficient than the previous engine, and complied with Euro II emissions standards. It was also 20 percent more powerful than Holden's Ecotec (Buick V6 engine) in the VX II Commodore.

Power: 182 kW (244 hp)
Torque: 380 N⋅m (280 lb⋅ft)
Compression ratio: 9.7:1

==== Barra 190 ====
The Barra 190 was released in 2005, and was standard in the BF Falcon and SY Territory. It increased in compression ratio, power by 8 kW (11 hp), and torque by 3 N⋅m (2 lb⋅ft) and had dual independent variable camshaft timing. Efficiency was improved by two to six percent. In 2006 it was made compliant with Euro III emissions standards.

Power: 190 kW (255 hp) at 5250 rpm
Torque: 383 N⋅m (282 lb⋅ft) at 2500 rpm
Compression ratio: 10.3:1

==== Barra 195 ====
The Barra 195 was released in 2008, and was the final revision of the naturally aspirated inline-six. It was used in the FG Falcon, FG X Falcon, and SZ Territory. It had a plastic inlet manifold, replacing the previous 4 kg (9 lb) heavier alloy manifold, an electric throttle body, and a redesigned 'Fast Burn' cylinder head with a faster burn rate in the combustion chamber caused by an additional swirl. It increased the power by 5 kW (7 hp), torque by 8 N⋅m (6 lb⋅ft) and was more fuel efficient. In 2010 it was made compliant with Euro IV emissions standards.

Power: 195 kW (261 hp) at 6000 rpm
Torque: 391 N⋅m (288 lb⋅ft) at 3250 rpm
Compression ratio: 10.3:1

=== Turbocharged Petrol ===
==== Barra 240T ====
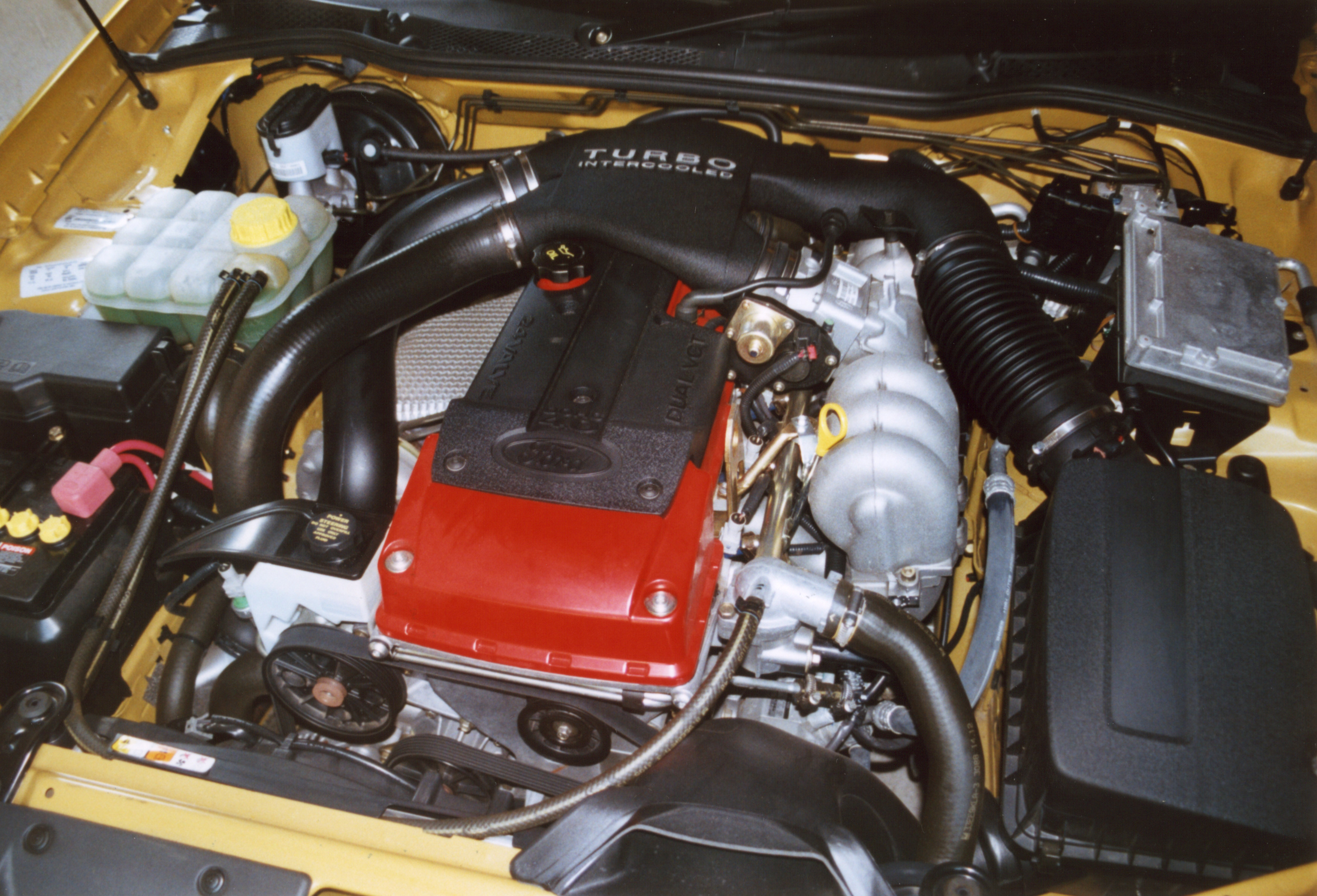
Barra 240T in a BA Falcon XR6 Turbo

The Barra 240T engine was introduced in 2002, in the BA Falcon XR6 Turbo. It is based on the Barra 182, it has a single Garrett GT3582R turbocharger with 6 psi (0.4 bar) of boost, different pistons lowering the compression ratio, higher fuel pressure, Inconel exhaust valve, and an intercooler.

Power: 240 kW (322 hp) at 5250 rpm
Torque: 450 N⋅m (332 lb⋅ft) at 2000–4500 rpm
Compression ratio: 8.7:1

==== Barra 245T ====
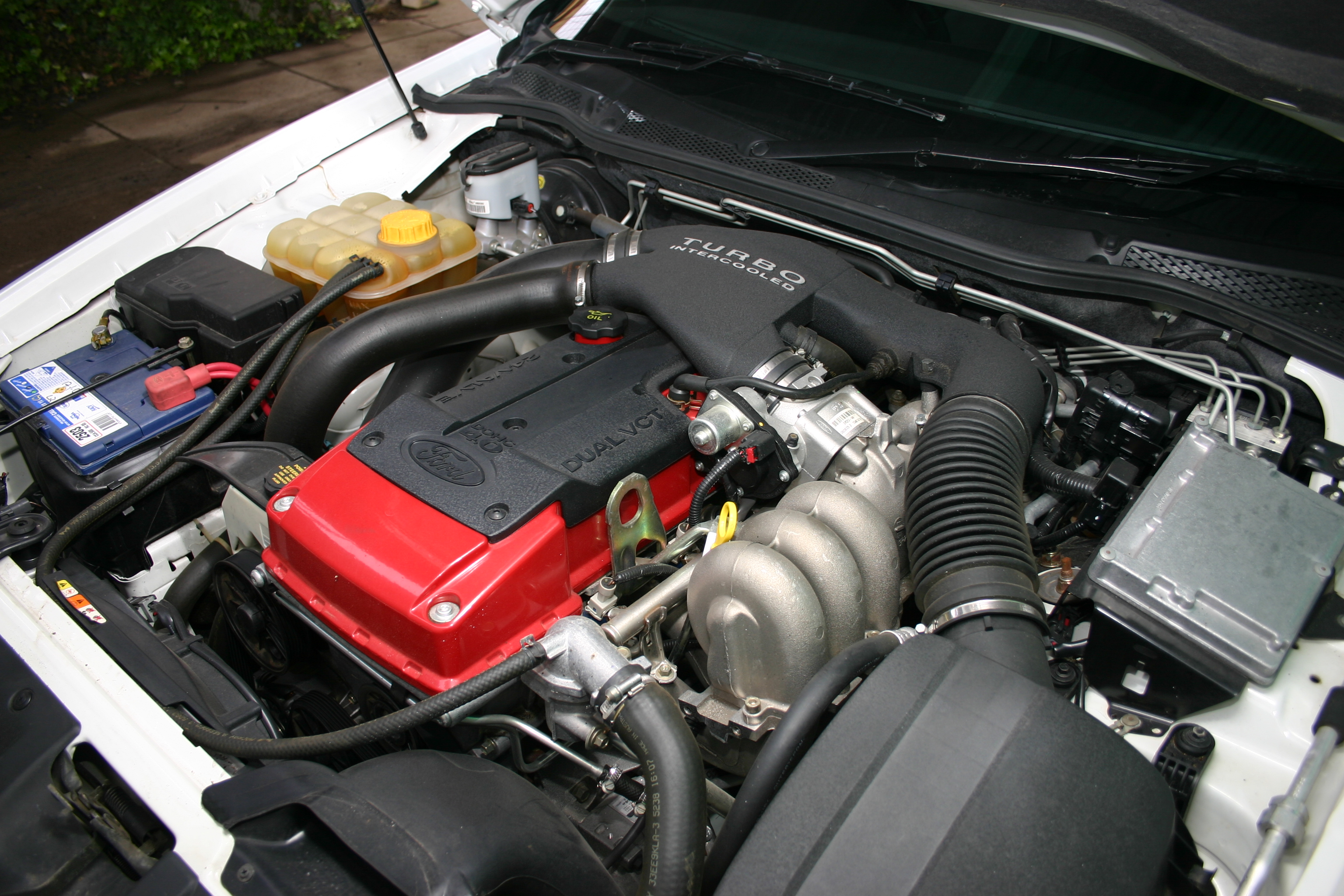
Barra 245T in a BF Falcon XR6 Turbo

The Barra 245T engine was introduced in 2005, in the BF Falcon XR6 Turbo. The power was increased by 5 kW (7 hp) and torque by 30 N⋅m (22 lb⋅ft), meets Euro III emissions standards, received stronger pistons, and a new, redesigned intake manifold, with the release of the BF series II the engine received strengthened connecting rods from the Barra E-Gas, and improved valve springs. It was also used in the 2006 to 2011 SY Territory Turbo, where it had a top-mounted intercooler, instead of a front-mounted one like the Falcon.

Power: 245 kW (329 hp) at 5250 rpm
Torque: 480 N⋅m (354 lb⋅ft) at 2000–4500 rpm
Compression ratio: 8.9:1

==== Barra 270T (FPV) ====
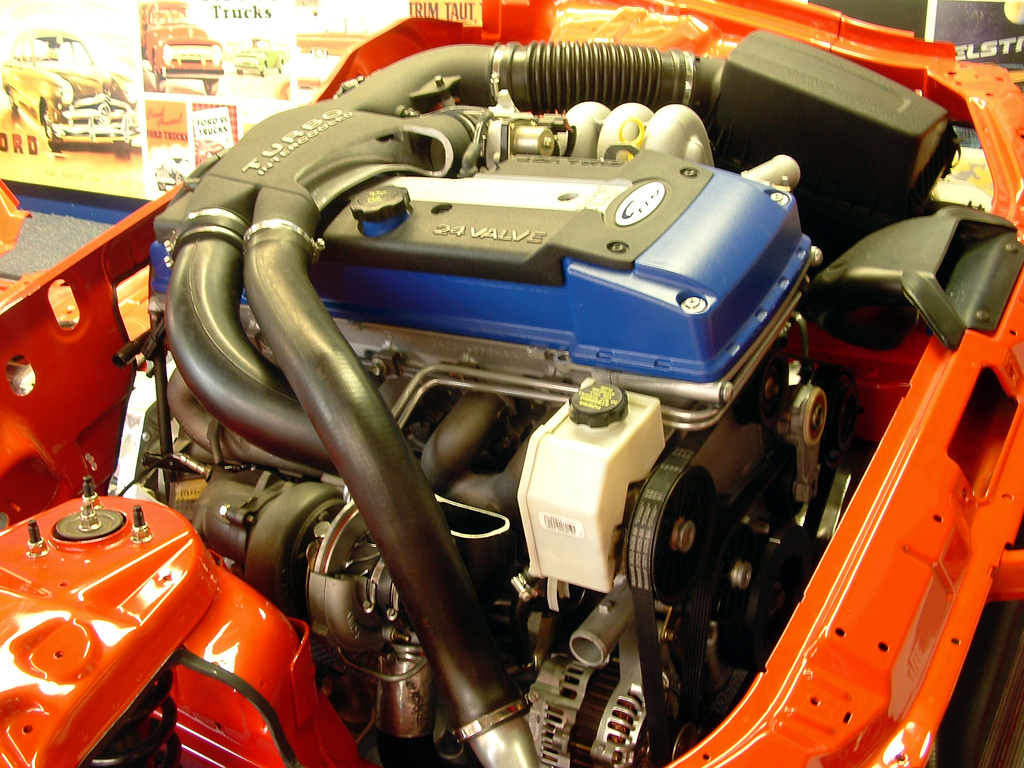
Barra 270T from a FPV Typhoon

The Barra 270T engine was used by Ford Performance Vehicles (FPV), in the BA and BF Falcon-based FPV F6 Typhoon and Tornado, and the SY Territory-based FPV F6X. It was based on the Barra 240T/245T, the increase in power is achieved through the use of improved pistons, larger intercooler, strengthened connecting rods and revised air intake. It was produced between 2004 and 2009.

Power: 270 kW (362 hp) at 5250 rpm
Torque: 550 N⋅m (406 lb⋅ft) at 2000–4250 rpm
Compression ratio: 8.7:1

==== Barra 270T (FG) ====
The Barra 270T engine was used in the FG and FG X XR6 Turbo, and was introduced in 2008. The turbocharger was changed for a smaller one which spools faster, with a smaller intercooler and injectors, a new intake and higher compression ratio, boost was increased to 10 psi (0.7 bar), the power was increased by 25 kW (34 hp) and torque by 53 N⋅m (39 lb⋅ft), with an overboost feature increasing the boost by 10 percent. In 2010 it was made compliant with Euro IV emissions standards.

Power: 270 kW (362 hp) at 5250 rpm
Torque: 533 N⋅m (393 lb⋅ft) at 2000–4750 rpm.
Compression ratio: 8.8:1

==== Barra 310T ====
The Barra 310T was used in the FG Falcon-based FPV F6, introduced in 2008. It increases the power by 40 kW (54 hp) and torque by 15 N⋅m (11 lb⋅ft), the boost was increased to 13.3 psi (1 bar). It was the first Australian engine to produce 100 hp (75 kW) per litre. It was updated in 2010 to be compliant with Euro IV emissions standards. It was discontinued in 2014, with Ford closing down Ford Performance Vehicles.

Power: 310 kW (416 hp) at 5500 rpm
Torque: 565 N⋅m (417 lb⋅ft) at 1950–5200 rpm
Compression ratio: 8.47:1

==== Barra 325T ====
The Barra 325T was used in the FG X XR6 Sprint in 2016, it was the final and most powerful Barra engine, and the most powerful six-cylinder engine built in Australia. It uses the turbocharger and fuel injectors from the Barra 310T, a larger intercooler and a carbon fibre air intake, it increased the power by 55 kW (74 hp) to 325 kW (436 hp) and torque by 43 N⋅m (32 lb⋅ft) to 576 N⋅m (425 lb⋅ft), with overboost increasing it to 370 kW (496 hp) and 650 N⋅m (479 lb⋅ft).

Power: 325 kW (436 hp) at 6000 rpm. Overboost: 370 kW (496 hp)
Torque: 576 N⋅m (425 lb⋅ft) at 2750 rpm. Overboost: 650 N⋅m (479 lb⋅ft)
Compression ratio: 8.8:1

=== Liquefied Petroleum Gas ===
==== Barra E-Gas ====
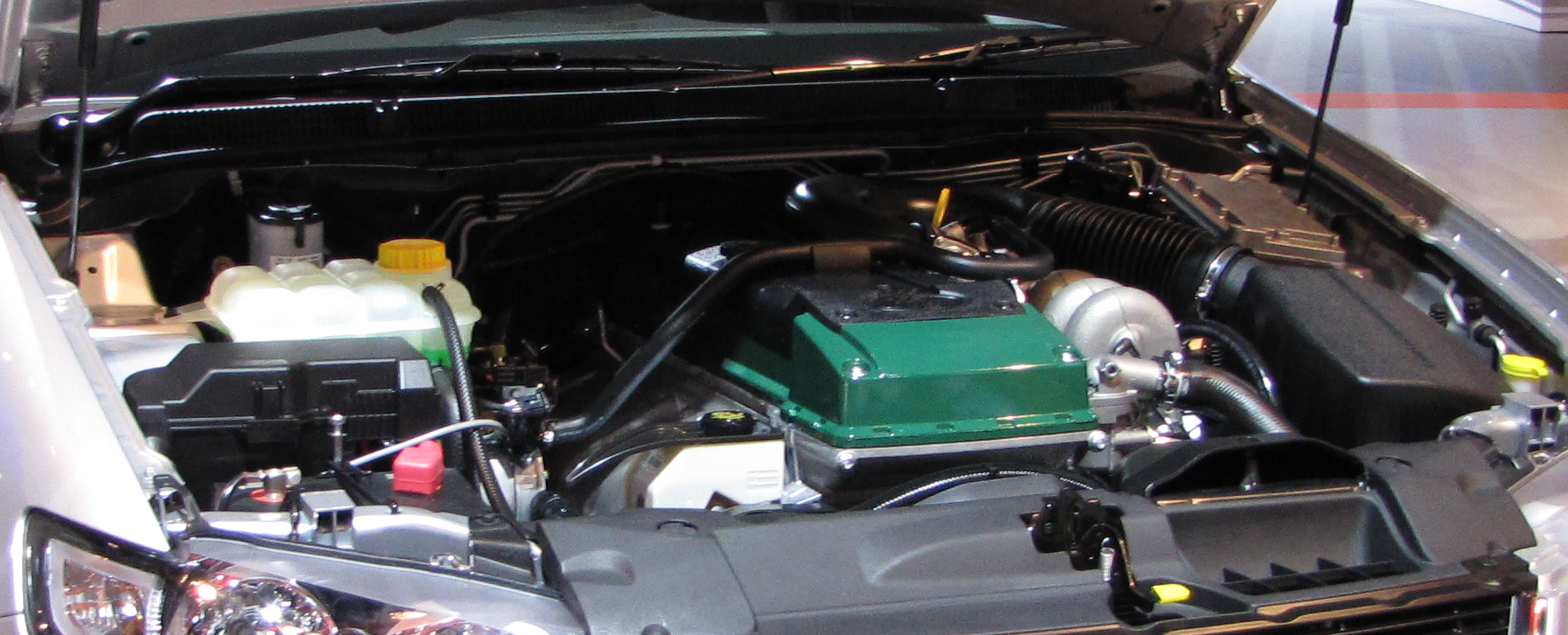
Barra E-Gas in a Ford Falcon (FG)

The Barra E-Gas was launched in 2002, with the BA Falcon. It was an autogas (LPG) only engine. It featured a Vialle venturi system, without any LPG injector system, and with stronger H-section connecting rods and valves. In 2005, with the release of the BF Falcon the torque was raised from 372 N⋅m (274 lb⋅ft) to 374 N⋅m (276 lb⋅ft). In the FG Falcon the durability of the engine was improved with revised seals and valves.

Power: 156 kW (209 hp) at 4750–5000 rpm
Torque: 372–374 N⋅m (274–276 lb⋅ft) at 2750–3000 rpm
Compression ratio (BA E-Gas): 10.7:1
Compression ratio (BF / FG E-Gas): 10.3:1

==== Barra EcoLPi ====
The Barra EcoLPi was launched in 2011 in the FG Falcon, and replaced the E-Gas engine. It features a liquid phase injection system. In the FG X Falcon the anti-roll bars for the EcoLPI were revised.

Power: 198 kW (266 hp) at 5000 rpm
Torque: 409 N⋅m (302 lb⋅ft) at 3250 rpm
Compression ratio: 12.0:1

=== Discontinuation ===
On 23 May 2013, Ford Australia confirmed that the Barra engine would be discontinued along with the Ford Falcon and Territory by October 2016. Ford Australia's engine manufacturing operations ceased on 26 September 2016 and car assembly on 7 October 2016. Ford Australia president Bob Graziano cited unprofitability due to high production costs and dwindling market share for the demise of local manufacturing.

=== Tuning community ===
The Barra engine is popular with tuners due to being able to handle large tuning potential, and its reliability when modified. With only minor modifications needed for a high amount of horsepower.

== V8 ==
Ford Barra V8
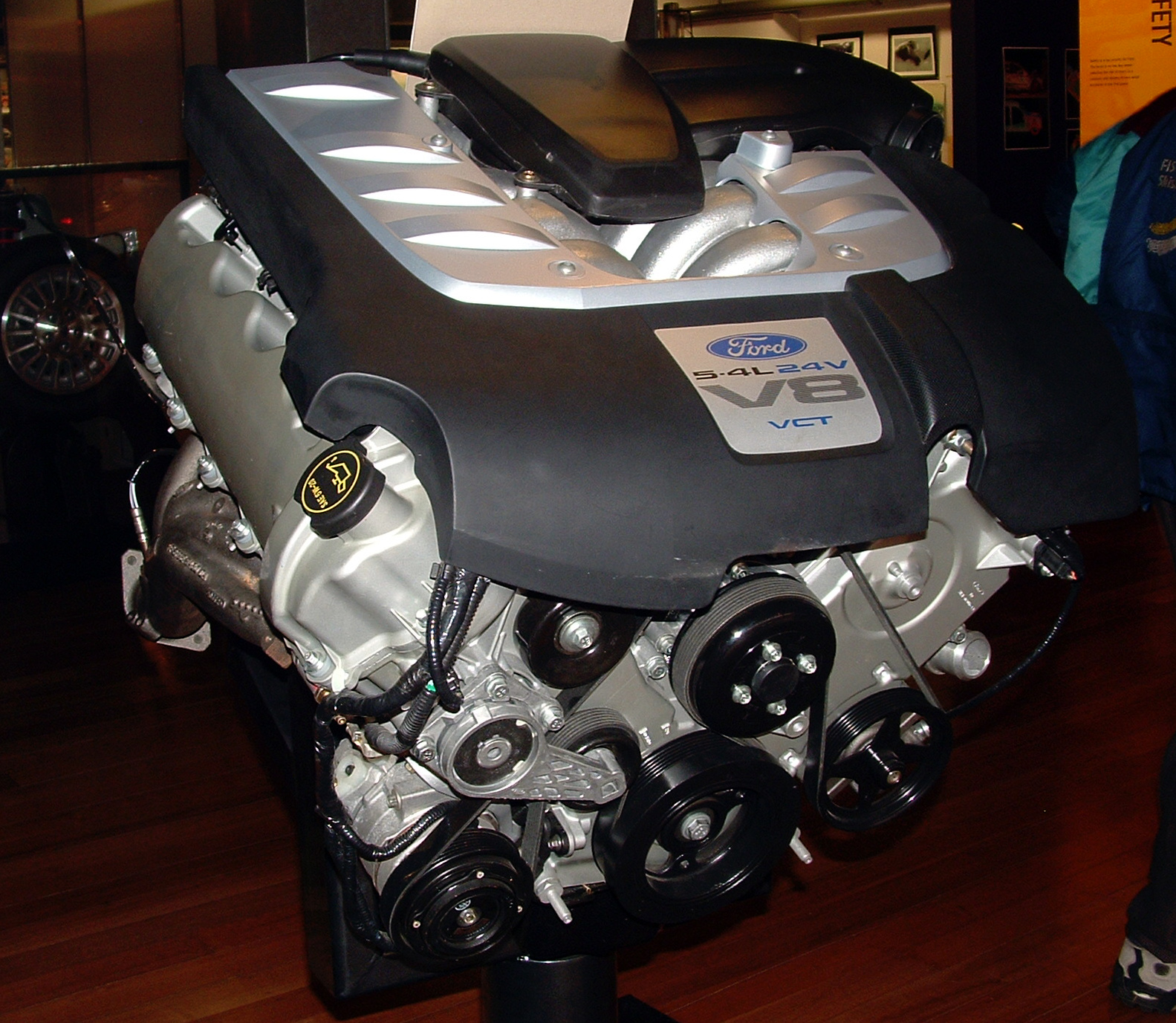
- Ford Barra 220 V8

Layout
- Displacement: 5,408 cc (330.0 cu in)
- Cylinder bore: 90.2 mm (3.55 in)
- Piston stroke: 105.8 mm (4.17 in)
- Cylinder block material: Cast iron
- Cylinder head material: Aluminium
- Valvetrain: SOHC 3 valves per cyl with VCT
- Compression ratio: 10.3:1

Combustion
- Fuel type: Unleaded

Output
- Power output: 220–230 kW (300–310 hp)
- Torque output: 470–500 N⋅m (350–370 lb⋅ft)

The Barra V8s were manufactured at the Essex Engine Plant in Windsor, Ontario, and was based on the Ford Modular engine. It had a displacement of 5.4 litres, and was SOHC with VCT incorporating 3 valves per cylinder. It was introduced in 2002 with the BA Falcon, and discontinued in 2008 with the release of the FG Falcon.

The Falcon was the first vehicle to use Ford's 5.4-litre, 3-valve V8 variant of the Modular V8.

=== Barra 220 ===
The Barra 220 was an optional engine on the BA Falcon, and standard for the Fairlane G220 and LTD. It was produced between 2002 and 2005.

Power: 220 kW (295 hp) at 4750 rpm
Torque: 470 N⋅m (347 lb⋅ft) from 3250 rpm

=== Barra 230 ===
The Barra 230 was an optional engine on the BF Fairlane and Falcon, and standard for the Fairlane G8 and LTD. It introduced a second knock sensor, more aggressive ignition calibration, and was made to comply with Euro III emissions standards. It was in production from 2005 until 2008, with the release of the FG Falcon.

Power: 230 kW (308 hp) at 5350 rpm
Torque: 500 N⋅m (369 lb⋅ft) at 3500 rpm

== See also ==
- Undersquare
- Ford of Australia modern V8s
