= Chevrolet Caprice =

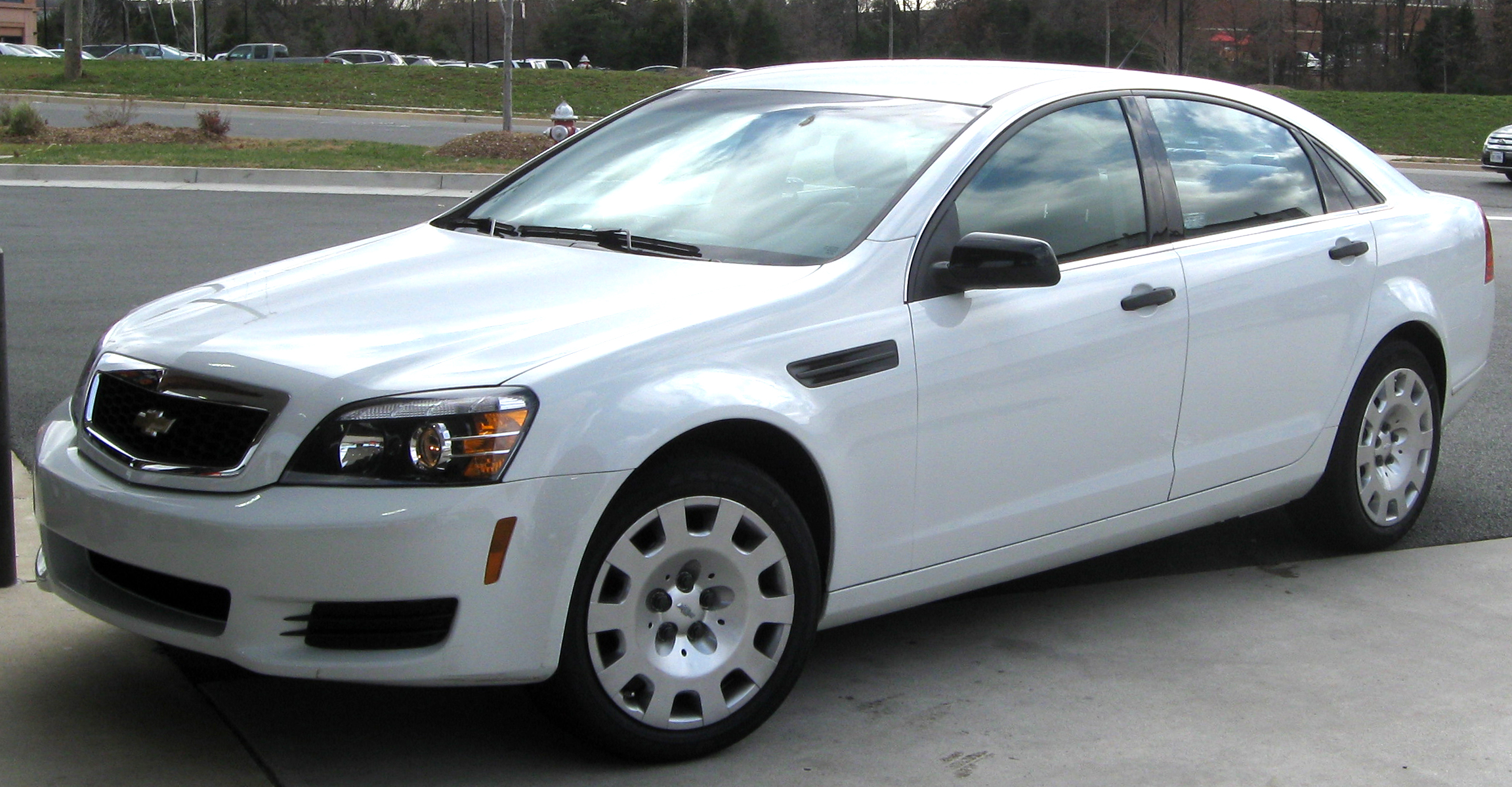
- 2011 Chevrolet Caprice PPV

Overview
- Manufacturer: Chevrolet (1964–1996); Holden (General Motors) (2000–2017)
- Production: 1965–1996; 2000–2017 (Holden)
- Model years: 1966–1996 (for civilian and police); 2000–2016 (Middle East); 2011–2017 (North America, PPV exclusive)

Body and chassis
- Class: Full-size
- Layout: FR layout
- Platform: B-body (1966–1996); V-body (2000–2006) (Middle East); Zeta platform (2007–2017) (Middle East) (2011–2017) (U.S.)

Chronology
- Predecessor: Chevrolet Impala (Argentina); Chevrolet Lumina (Mexico); Pontiac G8 (U.S.)

The Chevrolet Caprice is a full-size car produced by Chevrolet in North America from 1965 to the 1996 model years. All versions of the full-size Chevrolet models reached their peak in 1965, with over a million units sold. It was the most popular car in the U.S. in the 1960s and early 1970s, during a time when its production also included the Biscayne, Bel Air, and Impala trims.

Introduced in mid-1965 as a luxury trim package for the Impala four-door hardtop, Chevrolet offered a complete line of Caprice body style versions for the 1966 and subsequent model years, including a "formal hardtop" coupe and a station wagon. The 1971 through 1976 models are the largest Chevrolets built. The downsized 1977 and restyled 1991 models were awarded Motor Trend Car of the Year. Production ended in 1996.

From 2011 until 2017, the Caprice nameplate returned to North America as a full-size, rear wheel drive police vehicle, a captive import from Australia, built by General Motors' subsidiary Holden. The police vehicle is a rebadged version of the Holden WM/WN Caprice. The nameplate also had a civilian and police presence in the Middle East from 1999 until 2017, where the imported Holden Statesman/Caprice built by Holden was marketed as the Chevrolet Caprice in markets that included Saudi Arabia and the UAE.

== Early history ==
Differing accounts explain the origin of the Caprice name, including that the nameplate was given by Bob Lund, Chevrolet's General Sales Manager, after a classy restaurant he frequented in New York City. Another says the car was named after Caprice Chapman, the daughter of auto executive James P. Chapman.

A Caprice Custom Sedan option package (RPO Z18) was offered on the 1965 Chevrolet Impala 4-door hardtop, adding US$200 (equivalent to $2,043 in 2025) to the US$2,742 (equivalent to $28,014 in 2025) price tag. The Caprice option included a heavier frame, suspension changes, black-accented front grille and rear trim panel with Caprice nameplate, slender body sill moldings, Fleur-de-lis roof quarter emblems, color-keyed bodyside stripes and Caprice hood and dash emblems. Full wheel covers were the same as that year's Super Sport, but a Chevy bowtie emblem replaced the "SS" emblem in the spinner's center. The Super Sport's blackout rear trim panel was also used, but without the "Impala SS" nameplate. The interior featured a higher-grade cloth and vinyl seat and door trim (as well as thicker, higher-grade carpeting), faux walnut trim on the dashboard and door panels, pull straps on the doors, and extra convenience lights. A full vinyl roof was optional. A 283 cu in (4.6 L), 195 hp (145 kW) V8 engine was standard, as was a column-mounted shifter for the three-speed manual transmission.

The Caprice was intended to compete with the Ford LTD, Plymouth VIP, and AMC's Ambassador DPL. These models included luxuriously upholstered interiors with simulated wood dashboard and door-panel trim, thicker carpeting, sound insulation, courtesy lighting, and more upscale exterior trims.

== First generation (1966–1970) ==
=== 1966 ===
First generation
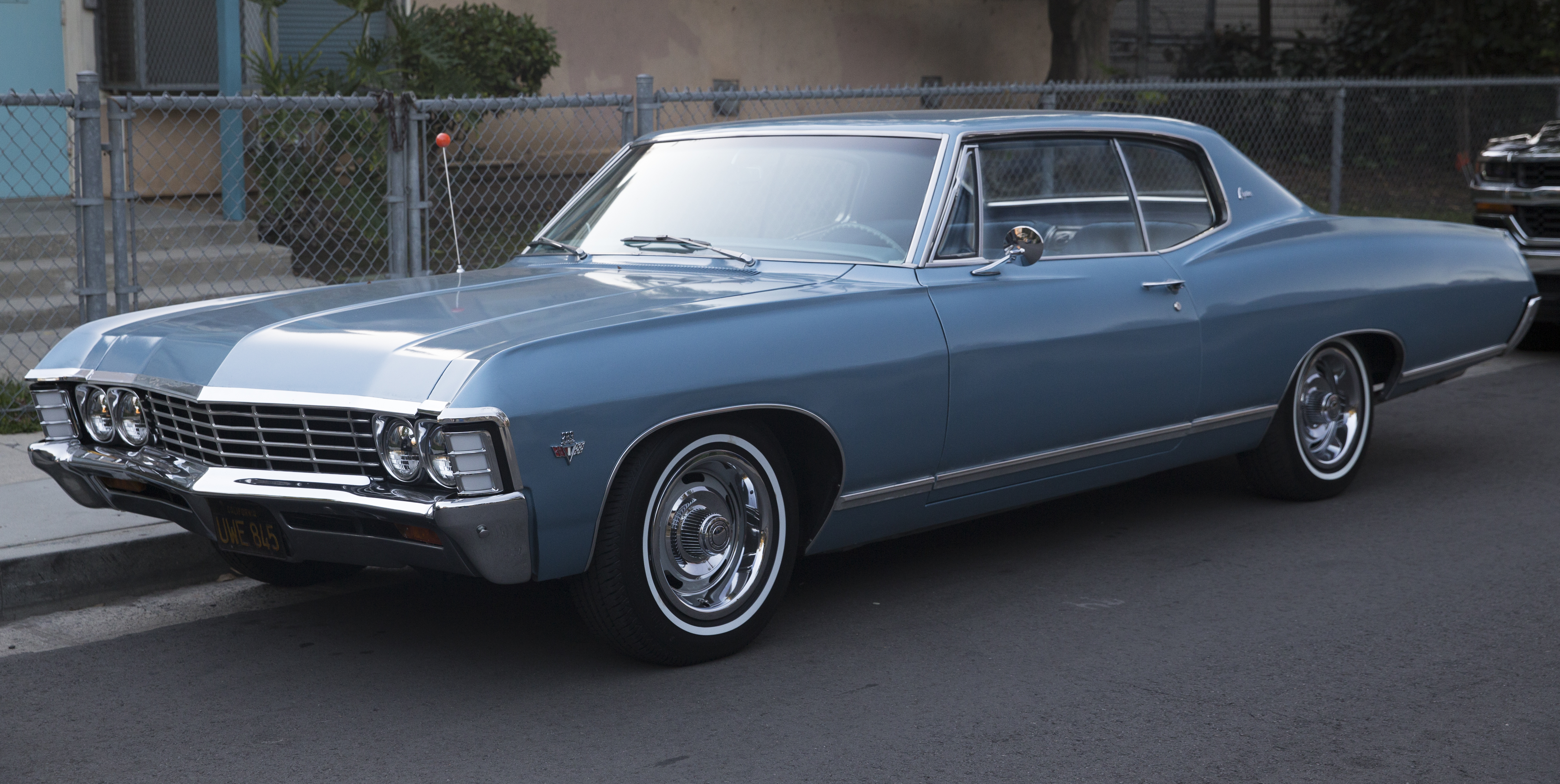
- 1967 Chevrolet Caprice Custom Coupe

Overview
- Production: 1965–1970
- Model years: 1966–1970
- Assembly: (main plant); Flint, Michigan, United States (Flint Truck Assembly); (branch assembly); Atlanta, Georgia, United States (Lakewood Assembly); Arlington, Texas, United States (Arlington Assembly); Doraville, Georgia, United States (Doraville Assembly); Janesville, Wisconsin, United States (Janesville Assembly); Lordstown, Ohio, United States (Lordstown Assembly); Norwood, Ohio, United States (Norwood Assembly); South Gate, California, United States (South Gate Assembly); St. Louis, Missouri, United States (St. Louis Truck Assembly); Tarrytown, New York, United States (North Tarrytown Assembly); Van Nuys, California, United States (Van Nuys Assembly); Wilmington, Delaware, United States (Wilmington Assembly); Oshawa, Ontario, Canada (Oshawa Car Assembly)

Body and chassis
- Body style: 2-door coupe; 4-door hardtop; 4-door station wagon
- Related: Buick LeSabre; Oldsmobile 88; Pontiac Bonneville

Powertrain
- Engine: 283 cu in (4.6 L) Small-Block V8; 307 cu in (5.0 L) Small-Block V8; 327 cu in (5.4 L) Small-Block V8; 350 cu in (5.7 L) Small-Block V8; 396 cu in (6.5 L) Big-Block V8; 400 cu in (6.6 L) Small-Block V8; 427 cu in (7.0 L) Big-Block V8; 454 cu in (7.4 L) Big-Block V8
- Transmission: 3-speed manual; 4-speed manual; Automatic Powerglide; Automatic Turbo Hydramatic

Dimensions
- Wheelbase: 119 in (3,023 mm)
- Length: 1966-67 wagon: 212.4 in (5,395 mm); 1966-67 others: 213.2 in (5,415 mm); 1968: 214.7 in (5,453 mm); 1970: 216.0 in (5,486 mm)
- Width: 79.6 in (2,022 mm)
- Height: Wagon: 55.3 in (1,405 mm); Others: 54.4–55.4 in (1,382–1,407 mm)

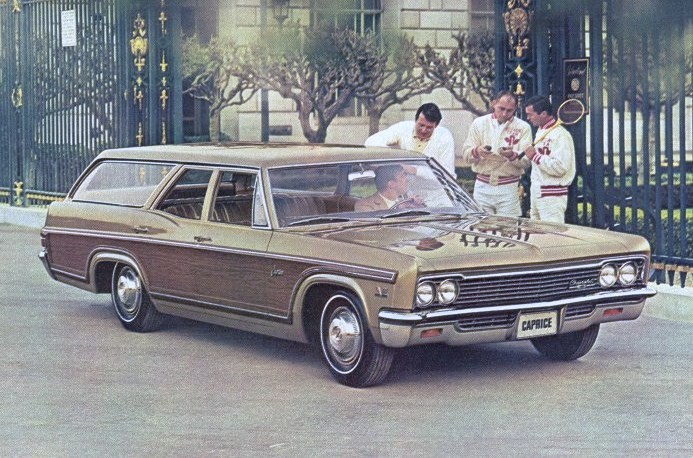
1966 Chevrolet Caprice Custom Estate

Caprice gained series status for the 1966 model year and was positioned as the top-line full-size Chevrolet. It included a four-door hardtop, six- or nine-passenger station wagon, and a two-door hardtop with a squared-off formal roofline in contrast to the Impala/SS Sport Coupe's fastback roof styling. All four Caprice models were marketed as "Caprice Custom."

The Caprice Custom Estate, a new station wagon model with simulated woodgrain exterior trim was the first Chevrolet with such a design since its real woodie wagon was offered in 1954 on the Chevrolet Bel Air. All wagons included an all-vinyl upholstered two-row bench seat interior with an optional third rear-facing seat for two. The Custom Estate became the full-sized station wagon when the Buick LeSabre Estate was discontinued in 1964. The 283 cu in (4.6 L) V8 engine was standard for Caprice models with the 325 hp (242 kW), 396 cu in (6.5 L) "Turbo Jet" V8 optional. It was possible to have Regular Production Option (RPO) L72, 425 hp (317 kW) 427 cu in (7.0 L) Turbo Jet V8 with solid lifters, special camshaft and carburetor, and 11 to 1 compression. An automatic transmission, power steering, white sidewall tires, and a vinyl top (on the hardtops) were extra-cost options, but most were built with them. Additionally, air conditioning, power windows, Cruise-Master speed control, power seats, an automatic headlight dimmer (1965 only) and stereo radios were available. The standard transmission was a Synchro-Mesh three-speed manual, mounted on the steering column. It remained standard throughout this generation.

The 1966 Caprice featured a revised grille and front bumper, and new rectangular taillights which replaced the Chevrolet-traditional triple round taillights used on Impalas since 1958, with the exception of the 1959 model. Lenses and silver trim on Caprices differed slightly from the other full-sized models. Sedans and coupe models included luxurious cloth and vinyl bench seats with a folding center armrest in the rear seat. Optional on both was a "Strato bench" seat which combined bucket-style seat backs and a center armrest with a bench cushion for six-passenger seating. Caprices had unique standard wheel covers, although some of the optional wheels and wheel covers on full-sized models were optional.

New options included the "Comfortron" air conditioning system where the driver could set a constant year-round temperature. A "Tilt/Telescopic" steering wheel option could be adjusted vertically in six positions, as well as be telescoped farther out from the steering column. Coupes could also be ordered with an all-vinyl interior featuring Strato bucket seats and center console with floor shifter, storage compartment, courtesy lighting, and full instrumentation at the front end of the console that was integrated with the lower instrument panel.

The 1965-70 GM B platform is the fourth best-selling automobile platform in history after the Volkswagen Beetle, Ford Model T, and the Lada Riva.

=== 1967–1968 ===
The 1967 Caprice received a restyling with more rounded body lines and revised grilles and taillights, optional front fender corner lamps which illuminated with the headlamps, as well as a revised instrument panel with round instruments and a new steering wheel. Taillamp lenses were all red as the backup lamps were relocated into the rear bumper, unlike in the lesser full-size models that had their backup lamps in the center of the taillamps. A dual-master brake cylinder was now included, while front disc brakes were optional. Other new options included a stereo 8-track tape player, power door locks, and a fiber optic exterior light monitoring system. The same seating selections continued as before with revisions to trim patterns plus the new addition of all-vinyl upholstery as a no-cost option for conventional and Strato bench seats in sedans and coupes. Engines and transmission offerings were carried over from the previous year. The exception was that the optional 425 hp (317 kW), 427 cu in (7.0 L) Turbo Jet V8 was no longer listed, leaving the 385 hp (287 kW) 427 as the top engine. The three-speed Turbo Hydramatic transmission that previously only available with the 396 cu in (6.5 L) and 427 V8s was now optional with the 275 hp (205 kW) 327 cu in (5.4 L) Turbo Fire V8. As with all 1967 cars sold in the U.S., Caprices featured occupant protection safety features that included an energy-absorbing steering column, soft or recessed interior control knobs, and front outboard shoulder belt anchors.

The "100 millionth GM car" was a light blue metallic 1967 Caprice coupe. It was assembled on April 21, 1967, at the Janesville, Wisconsin plant. It was actually the 100 millionth GM car built in the United States; production including Canadian plants had actually passed the 100 million mark in March 1966, with an Oldsmobile Toronado being the car in question.

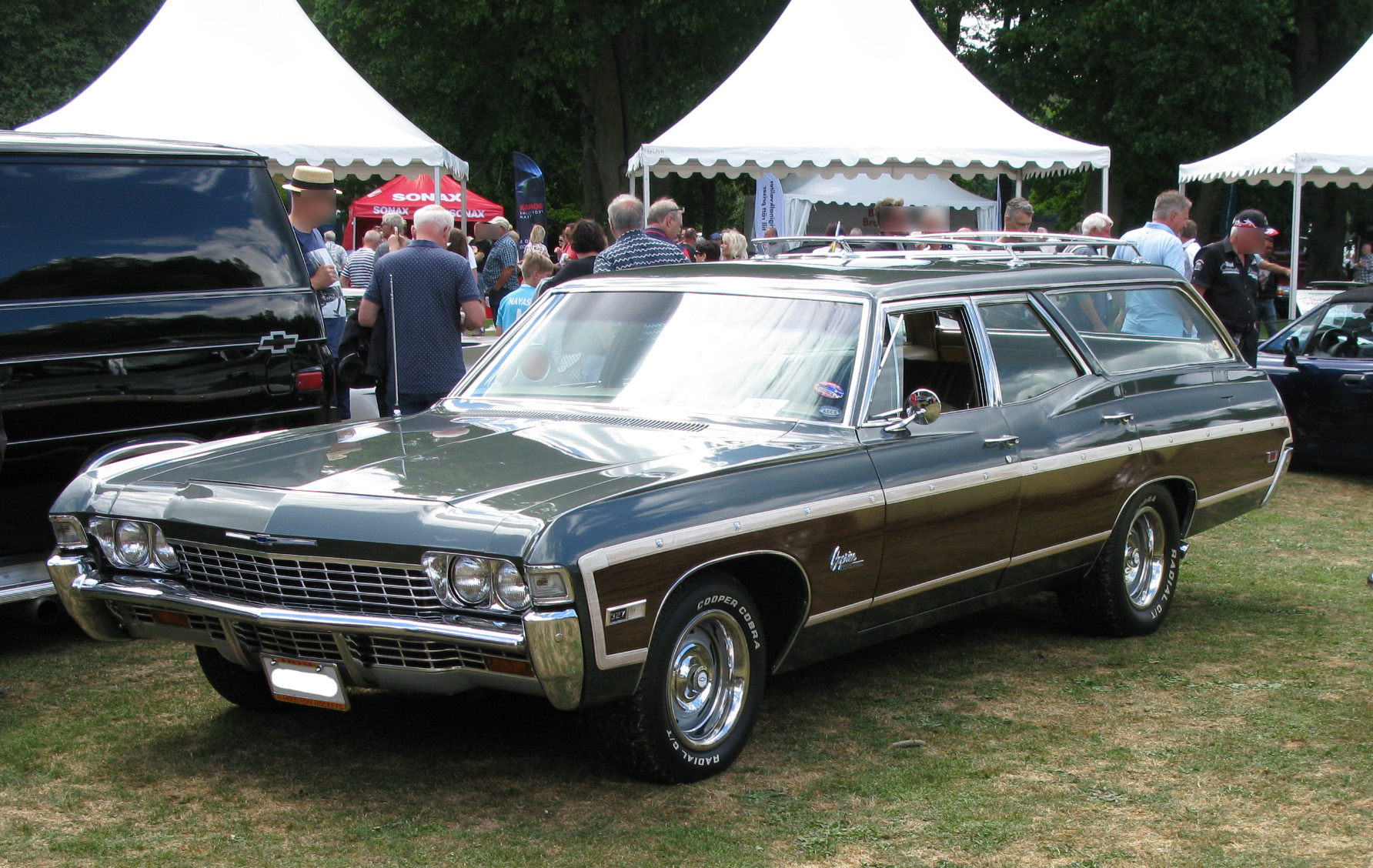
1968 Chevrolet Caprice Estate Wagon

The 1968 Caprice received a minor facelift that included a new grille with taillights set into the bumper and optional hidden headlamps. Caprice coupes now came standard with the new Astro Ventilation system, which included extra vents in the dash, and the removal of vent (wing) windows. Side marker lamps became standard on all U.S. cars and the Caprice carried over the optional white corner marker lamps at the forward edge of the fenders in addition to the amber parking lamps which were illuminated with the headlights. All 1968 Chevrolets got front side marker lamps on the fender; cars with an optional engine were identified with its cubic inch displacement listed on half the bezel; the lamp itself occupied the other half. The fiber optics monitoring system was offered again as an option. The Caprice Coupe got serious competition when Chevrolet offered the car's formal roofline in the Impala series as well. The Impala Custom Coupe became the best-selling model in the line. The L72 427 cu in (7.0 L) 425 hp (320 kW) Turbo-Jet V8 returned to the option list after a one-year hiatus. A new 307 cu in (5.0 L) Turbo Fire V8 rated at 200 hp (150 kW) replaced the 195 hp (145 kW) 283 cu in (4.6 L) small block as the standard engine. Inside, the instrument panel was revised with a return to the horizontal sweep speedometer and a revised three-spoke steering wheel. An optional instrument cluster had a narrow speedometer within its opening and flanking it with engine-turned instruments in the place of warning lamps. The fuel gauge, placed next to the speedometer within its own pod in the base models, was moved to its new place next to the speedometer. A tachometer took the place of the fuel gauge in the large opening left by the fuel gauge.

=== 1969–1970 ===
The 1969 Caprice and other full-sized Chevrolets were restyled with new body lines and front bumpers that wrapped around the grille (again with optional concealed headlamps, for which washers could be added as a new "one year only" option) along with ventless front windows on all models. The 119-inch (3,023 mm) wheelbase, inner bodyshell and framework were carried over from the 1965 model. The station wagon was renamed the Kingswood Estate and continued to use exterior wood grain trim along with the interior trim of the Caprice sedans and coupes. Front seat headrests were now standard equipment to meet federal safety standards and the ignition switch moved from the dashboard to the steering column and also locked the steering wheel when the key was removed. This was part of a Federal mandate for the 1970 models, but introduced a year earlier on all General Motors cars except the Corvair.

The 1969 Caprice also offered a new GM-designed variable-ratio power steering unit as optional equipment along with a seldom-ordered "Liquid Tire Chain" option, which was a vacuum activated button that would spray ice melt on the rear tires (UPC option code is "V75"). The standard engine was enlarged to a 235 hp (175 kW) 327 cu in (5.4 L) V8 with optional engine choices including a new 350 cu in (5.7 L) Turbo Fire V8 in 255 or 300 hp (190 or 224 kW) versions, a 265 hp (198 kW) 396 cu in (6.5 L) cubic-inch Turbo Jet V8, as well as a 427 cu in (7.0 L) Turbo Jet V8s rated at 335 hp (250 kW) or 390 hp (291 kW). All V8 engines were now available with the three-speed Turbo Hydramatic transmission for the first time though the two-speed Powerglide was still offered with the 327 and 350 V8s.

The 1970 Caprice received a minor facelift featuring a more conventional under the grille bumper replacing the wrap-around unit used in 1969, along with new triple vertical taillamps in the rear bumper. Power front disc brakes and fiberglass-belted tires on 15-inch wheels were made standard equipment along with a 250 hp (186 kW), 350 cubic-inch Turbo Fire V8. Optional V8s included a 300 hp (224 kW) 350 and a new 265 hp (198 kW) 400 cu in (6.6 L) Turbo Fire V8. The top engine was a new 454 cu in (7.4 L) Turbo Jet V8 offered in 345 hp (257 kW) or 390 hp (291 kW) versions. Both the 250- and 265-hp Turbo Fire engines were designed to use regular gasoline while the 300 hp (224 kW) 350 Turbo Fire and both 454 Turbo Jet engines required premium fuel. A three-speed manual transmission with column shift was standard equipment as in previous years but the floor-mounted four-speed manual with Hurst shifter was dropped from the option list for 1970 as were the Strato bucket seats and center console previously offered on coupes. Automatic transmission options included the two-speed Powerglide on 350 V8s and Turbo Hydra-Matic with all engines.

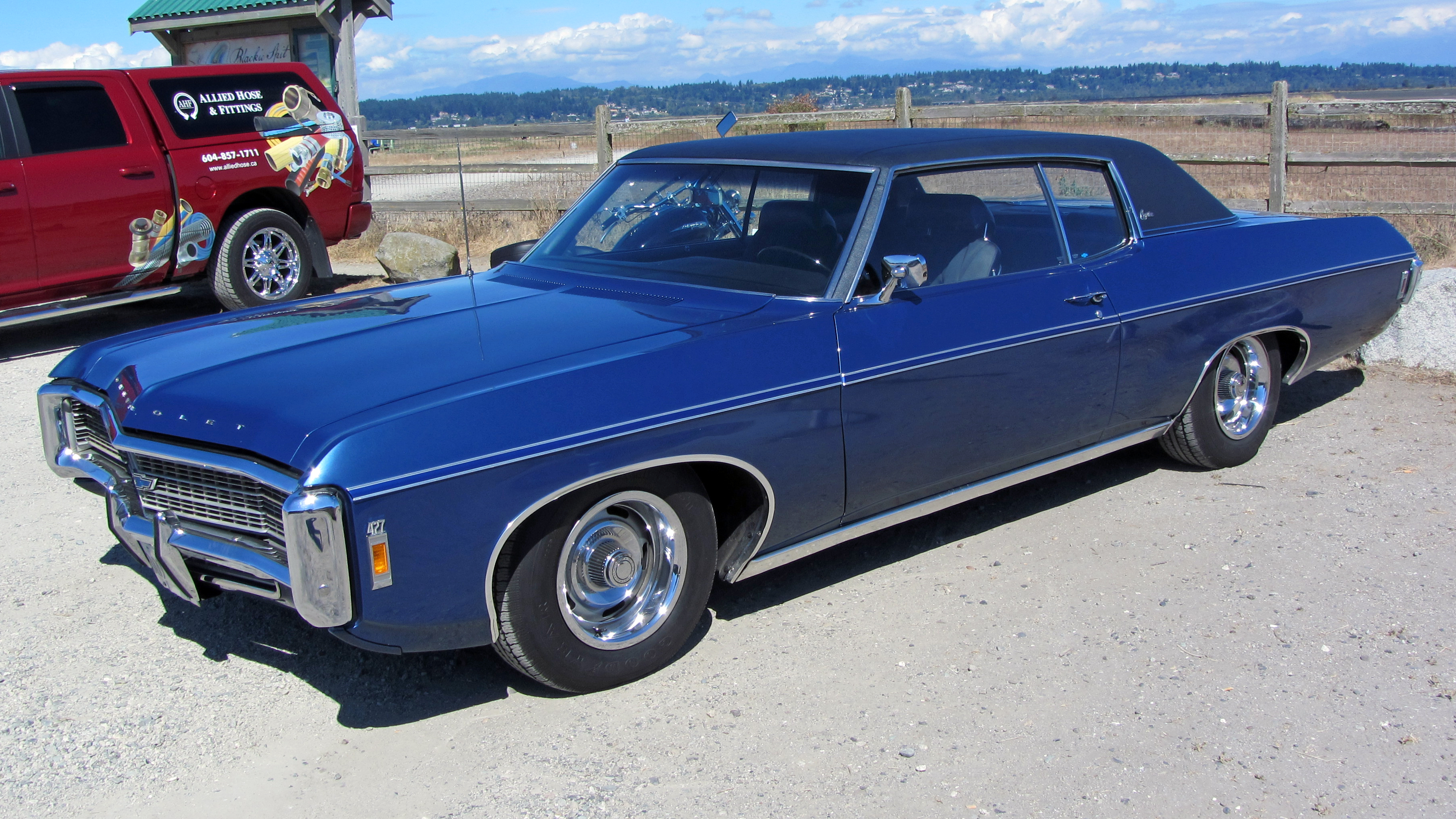
1969 Caprice Sport Coupe

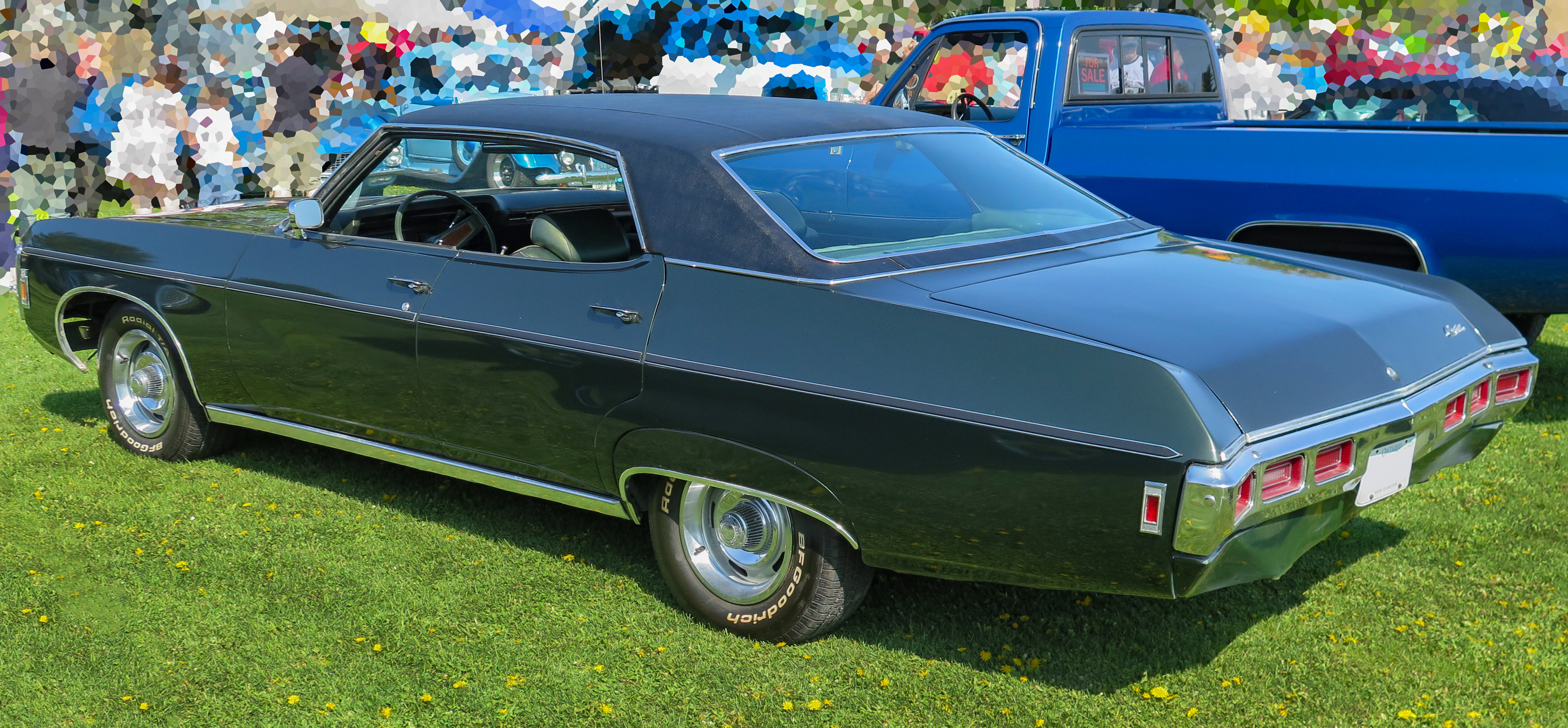
1969 Caprice hardtop sedan (rear)

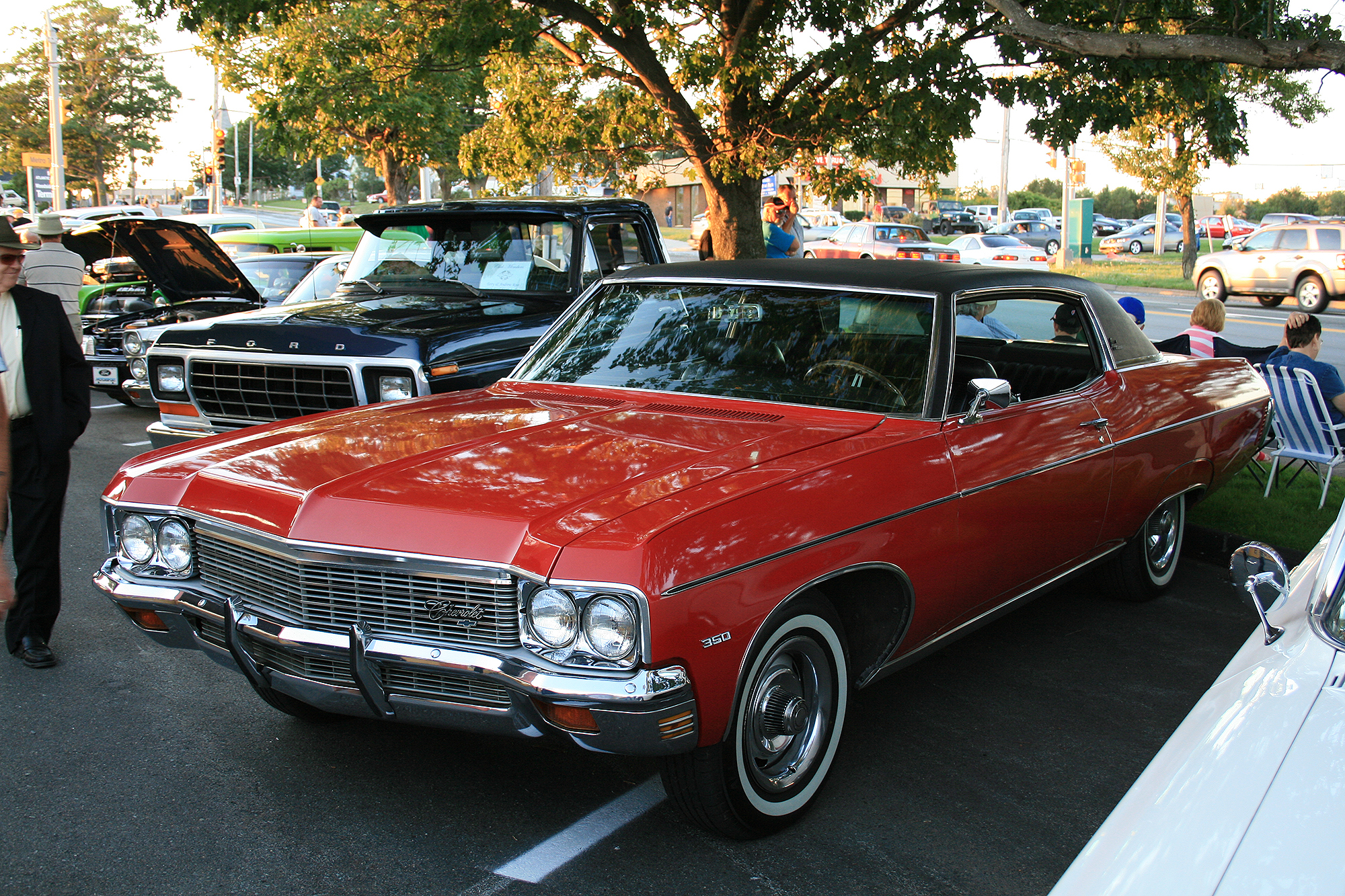
1970 Caprice Sport Coupe

== Second generation (1971–1976) ==
Second generation
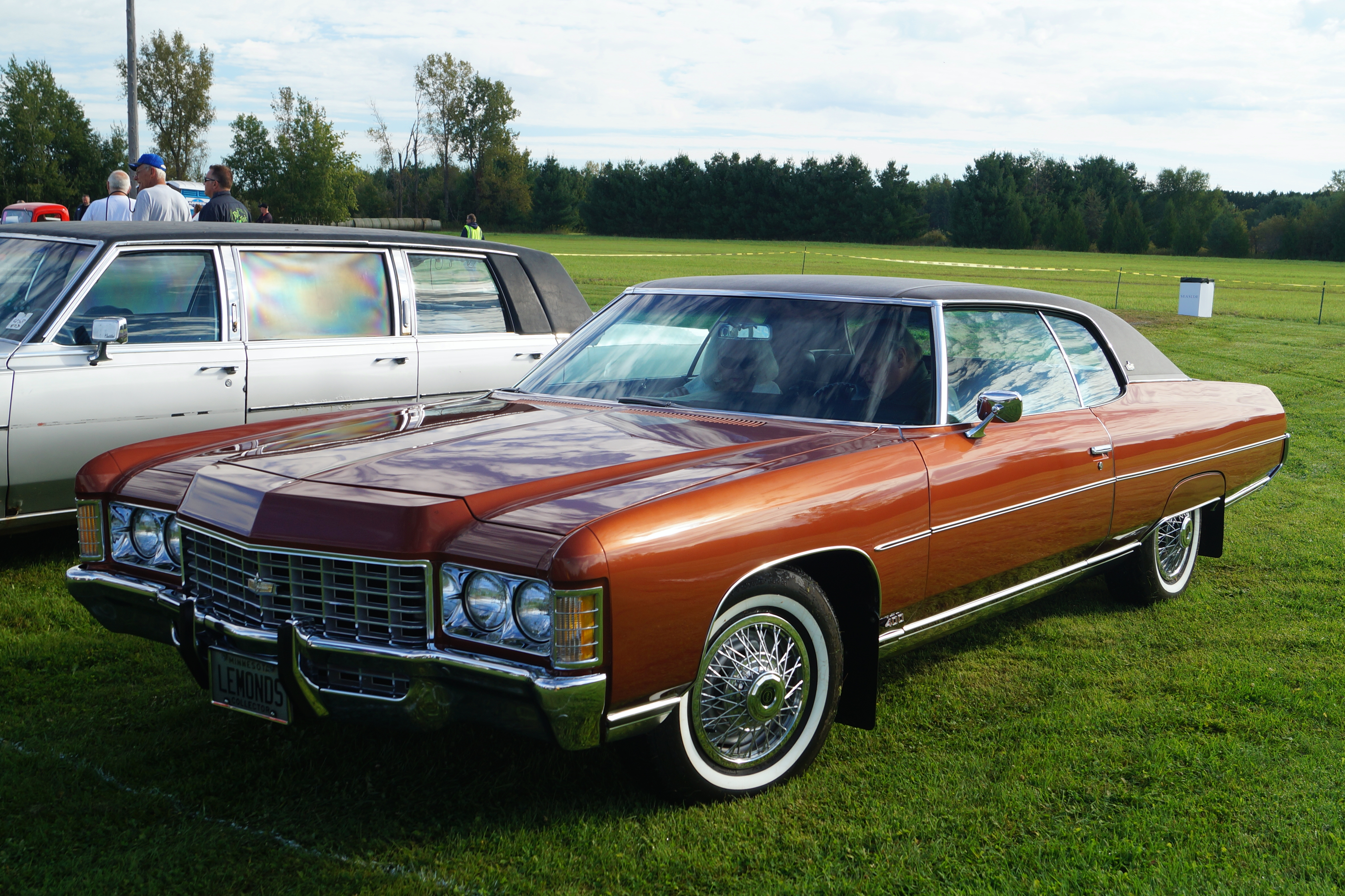
- 1971 Chevrolet Caprice Coupe

Overview
- Production: 1970–1976
- Model years: 1971–1976
- Assembly: Doraville Assembly, Doraville, Georgia; Janesville Assembly, Janesville, Wisconsin; St. Louis Truck Assembly, St. Louis, Missouri; South Gate Assembly, South Gate, California, United States; North Tarrytown Assembly, North Tarrytown, New York, United States; Wilmington Assembly, Wilmington, Delaware; Oshawa Car Assembly, Oshawa, Ontario, Canada
- Designer: Bill Mitchell

Body and chassis
- Body style: 2-door hardtop; 2-door coupe; 4-door hardtop; 4-door sedan; 4-door station wagon; 2-door convertible
- Related: (sedan); Chevrolet Biscayne; Chevrolet Bel Air; Chevrolet Impala; Chevrolet Brookwood; Chevrolet Townsman; Pontiac Catalina; Pontiac Parisienne; Pontiac Bonneville; Pontiac Grand Ville; Oldsmobile 88; Buick LeSabre; Buick Centurion; (station wagon); Chevrolet Kingswood; Pontiac Safari; Oldsmobile Custom Cruiser; Buick Estate

Powertrain
- Engine: 350 cu in (5.7 L) Small-Block V8; 400 cu in (6.6 L) Small-Block V8; 402 cu in (6.6 L) Big-Block V8; 454 cu in (7.4 L) Big-Block V8
- Transmission: 3-speed manual; 4-speed manual; 2-speed Automatic Powerglide; 3-speed Automatic Turbo Hydramatic

Dimensions
- Wheelbase: 121.5 in (3,086 mm)
- Length: 219.9 in (5,585 mm) (1972); 221.9 in (5,636 mm) (1973); 222.7 in (5,657 mm) (1974–75); 222.9 in (5,662 mm) (1976)
- Width: 79.5 in (2,019 mm)
- Height: 53.4–54.1 in (1,356–1,374 mm)

=== 1971–1972 ===
For 1971 the top-of-the-line Caprice was completely redesigned on a longer 121.5-inch (3,090 mm) wheelbase and featured bold, Chrysler-like fuselage styling. Flush exterior door handles and double-shell roofs were new on the Caprice – both features first appearing on the 1970½ Camaro and Pontiac Firebird. The new styling was highlighted by a Cadillac-like "egg-crate" grille with a "Caprice" emblem in the center and brushed metal trim surrounding the taillights on the rear deck. The "Full-Perimeter" frame and all-coil suspension were refined for improvements in ride and noise reduction.

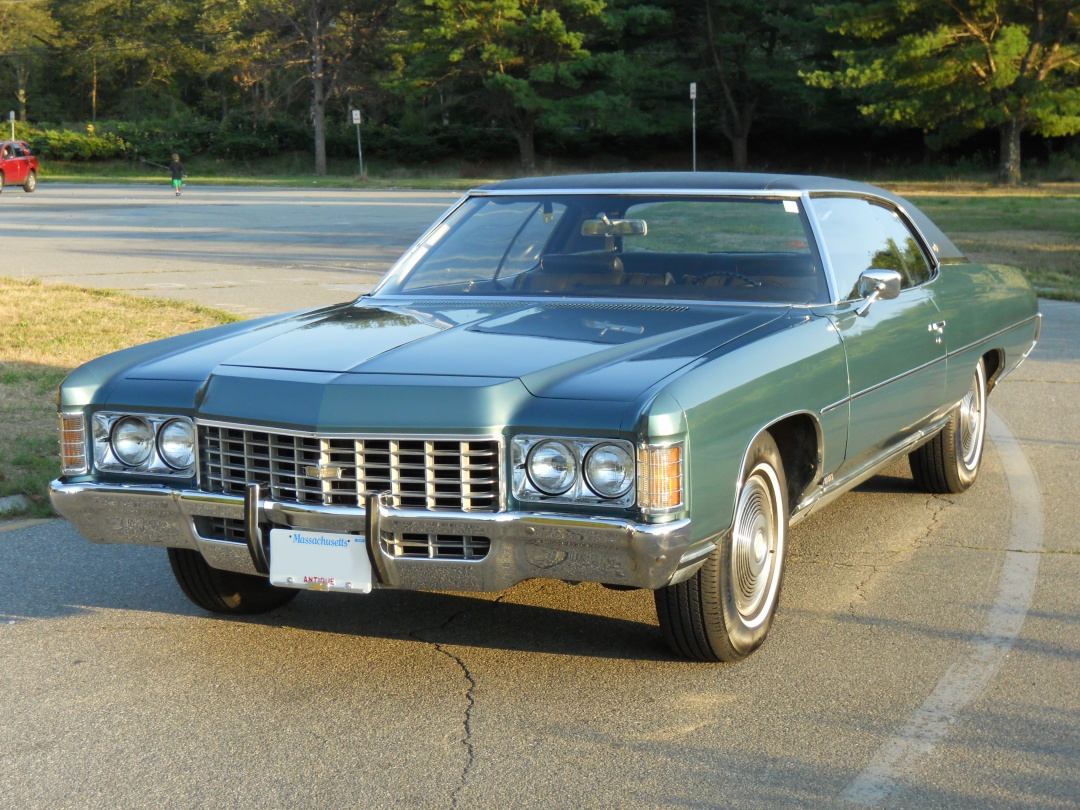
1971 Chevrolet Caprice Coupe

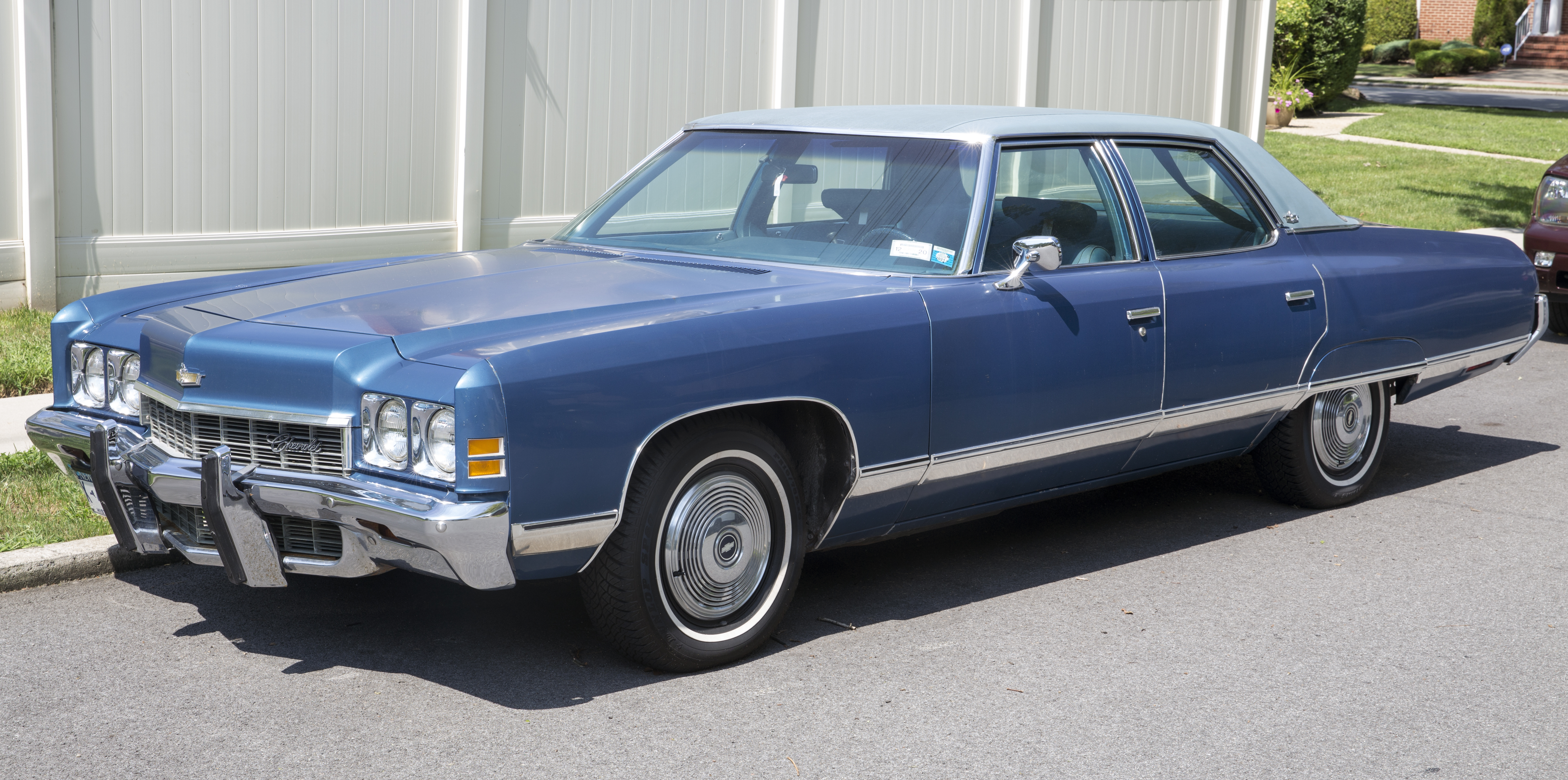
1972 Chevrolet Caprice 4-door sedan

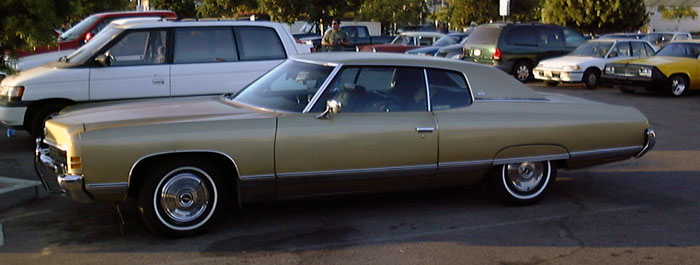
1972 Chevrolet Caprice Coupe

Inside were revised interiors featuring a two-spoke cushioned steering wheel and new instrument panel with horizontal sweep speedometer and instrument placement similar to previous full-sized Chevrolets. Caprices continued with higher grade interiors than their Impala counterparts with luxurious cloth-and-vinyl upholstery, wood grain trim on the dash, steering wheel, and door panels as well as carpeting on lower door panels on both sedans and coupes. A center front seat armrest was also featured on sedans.

Station wagons now used a unique 125-inch (3,200 mm) wheelbase and were larger than ever before. Station wagons continued to use unique model names. The Kingswood Estate wagon was considered to be equivalent to the Chevrolet Caprice being the top-level wagon. Unlike previous years, station wagons had unique rear suspension using a solid axle with leaf springs as opposed to coil springs and trailing arms on sedans and coupes.

Wagons featured a "clamshell" design marketed as the Glide-away tailgate, also called a "disappearing" tailgate because when open, the tailgate was completely out of view. On the clamshell design, the rear power-operated glass slid up into the roof and the lower tailgate (with either manual or optional power operation), lowered completely below the load floor. The manual lower tailgate was counterbalanced by a torque rod similar to the torque rods used in holding a trunk lid open, requiring a 35 lb push to fully lower the gate. Raising the manual gate required a 5 lb pull via a handhold integral to the top edge of the retractable gate. The power operation of both upper glass and lower tailgate became standard equipment in later model years. Wagons with the design featured an optional third row of forward-facing seats accessed by the rear side doors and a folding second-row seat — and could accommodate a 4 ft × 8 ft (1.2 m × 2.4 m) sheet of building material with rear seats folded. The clamshell design required no increased footprint or operational area to open, allowing a user to stand at the cargo opening without the impediment of a door — for example, in a closed garage.

The Kingswood Estate had the 400 cu in (6.6 L) two-barrel engine as standard with the same engine options as the coupes and sedans. Station wagon models came only with single exhaust systems which meant lesser power ratings than coupes and sedans.

Power front disc brakes were standard equipment, along with a larger 255 hp (190 kW) gross (170 hp (127 kW) net) 400 cubic-inch Turbo Fire V8. This engine, along with all optional power plants, was designed to run on regular leaded, low-lead or unleaded gasoline of 91 research octane or higher. To achieve this, all engines had the compression ratios lowered to 8.5:1. General Motors was the first of the big three to have all engines run on regular fuel and these changes were made to help meet the increasingly stringent emission regulations that were to come into place in years to come.

Optional engines included 300 horsepower (206 net) 402 cubic-inch Turbo Jet V8 (marketed as "Turbo Jet 400 on full-size cars, and as "Turbo Jet 396 on intermediate cars) and 365 hp (272 kW) gross (285 hp (213 kW) net) 454 Turbo Jet V8 which came standard with dual exhaust. When equipped with dual exhaust, the 400 Turbo Jet was rated at 260 hp (194 kW). At year's beginning, a three-speed manual transmission was standard when the model was introduced in the fall of 1970, although at mid-year, the Turbo Hydramatic transmission and variable-ratio power steering became standard equipment on all Caprice models and lower-line models fitted with a V8 engine.

Chevrolet specifications included both "gross" and "net" horsepower figures in 1971, which was a year before the industry-wide transition to SAE net horsepower figures. SAE net horsepower standardized horsepower ratings in accord with SAE standard J1349 figures to get a more accurate horsepower figure. "Net" horsepower was measured "as installed" in a vehicle with power using accessories and emission equipment installed, exhaust systems, and air cleaners, leading to lower power ratings. For 1971, the 400 Turbo-Jet engine was rated at 300 gross horsepower with and without dual exhaust, while the more accurate net figures show it rated at 206 hp (154 kW) with a single exhaust and 260 with dual exhaust. Beginning in 1972, automakers would follow SAE standard J1349 and the "net" horsepower ratings were the only advertised ratings.

In its May 1971 issue, Motor Trend magazine published a comparison road test that included a Caprice Coupe and a Cadillac Sedan de Ville. The tested Caprice was powered by the 454 V8 and loaded with virtually all available options. Though testers noted that the Cadillac had a higher level of quality than the Chevrolet along with a far more luxurious interior (the DeVille was upholstered in leather while the Caprice had the standard cloth trim), the magazine ultimately considered the Chevy as the better value at $5,550 compared to the Cadillac's $9,081 price mainly due to the fact the $3,500 price difference bought only a modest-quality addition and a few more luxury features.

The 1972 Caprice received a facelift with a revised grille that was lower in height than the 1971 model flanked by a new bumper with increased protection one year ahead of the Federal mandate. This was done by a bumper within the bumper design. Heavy gauge beams reinforced the bumper and attached to the frame. The rear bumper also featured this design and now had the triple taillights now mounted in the bumper. Engine offerings were carried over from 1971 with the switch to "net" horsepower ratings including 170 hp (127 kW) for the standard two-barrel 400 cu in (6.6 L) Turbo Fire V8, 210 hp (157 kW) (240 hp (179 kW) with optional dual exhaust) for the four-barrel Turbo Jet 400 big-block V8 and 270 hp (201 kW) for the four-barrel dual exhaust 454 cu in (7.4 L) Turbo Jet V8 (rated at 230 hp (172 kW) in wagons with single exhaust). Turbo Hydramatic transmission, variable-ratio power steering and power front disc brakes continued as standard equipment. New to the Caprice lineup was a pillared four-door sedan. All models also featured a revised "Astro Ventilation" system utilizing vents in the doorjambs that replaced the troublesome 1971 version that used vents in the trunk lid and turned out to be a major source of complaints to Chevy (and other GM divisions) dealers from customers. 6-way power seats, 8-track tape players, and air conditioning were optional.

=== 1973–1974 ===
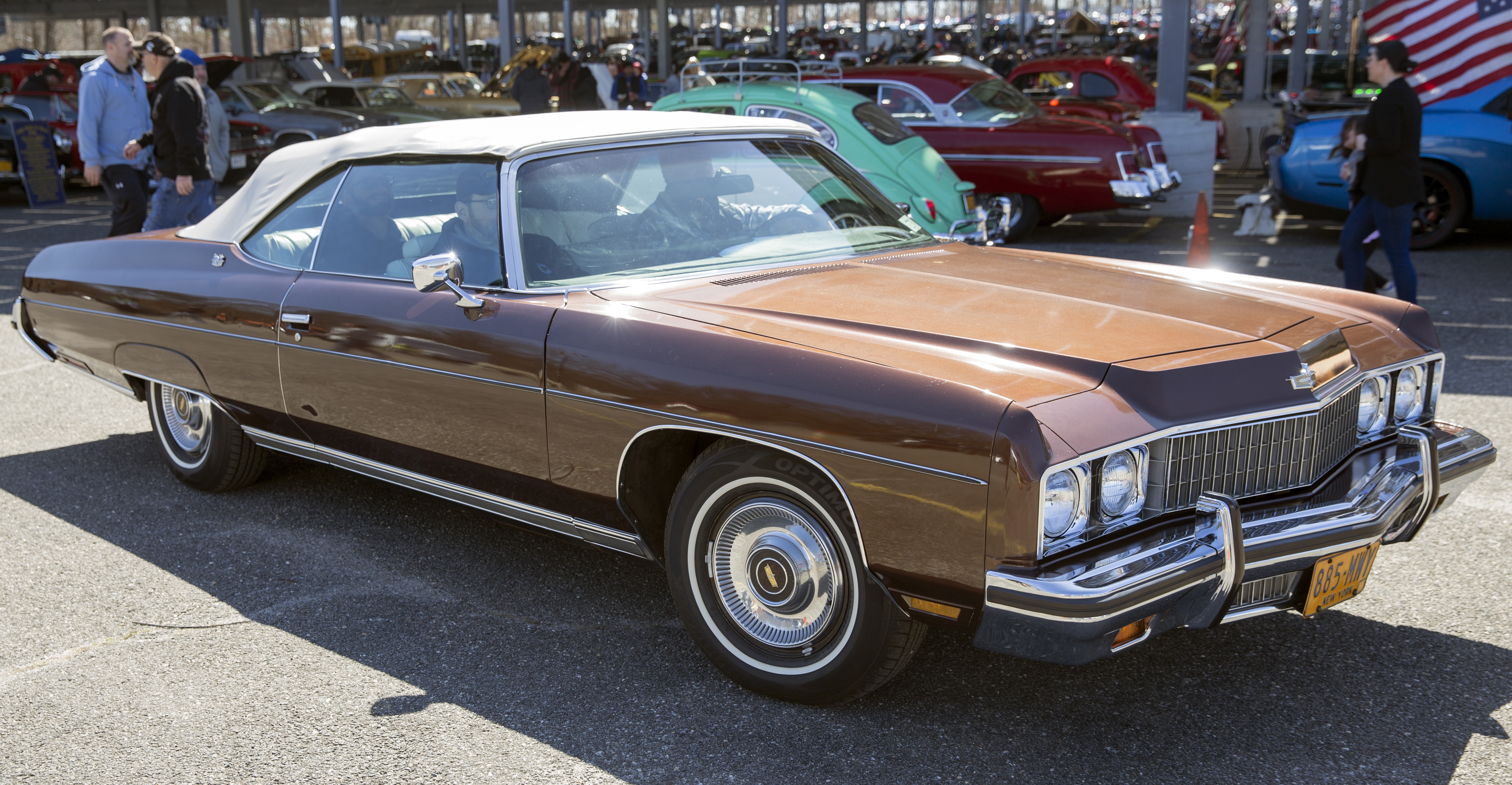
1973 Chevrolet Caprice Classic Convertible

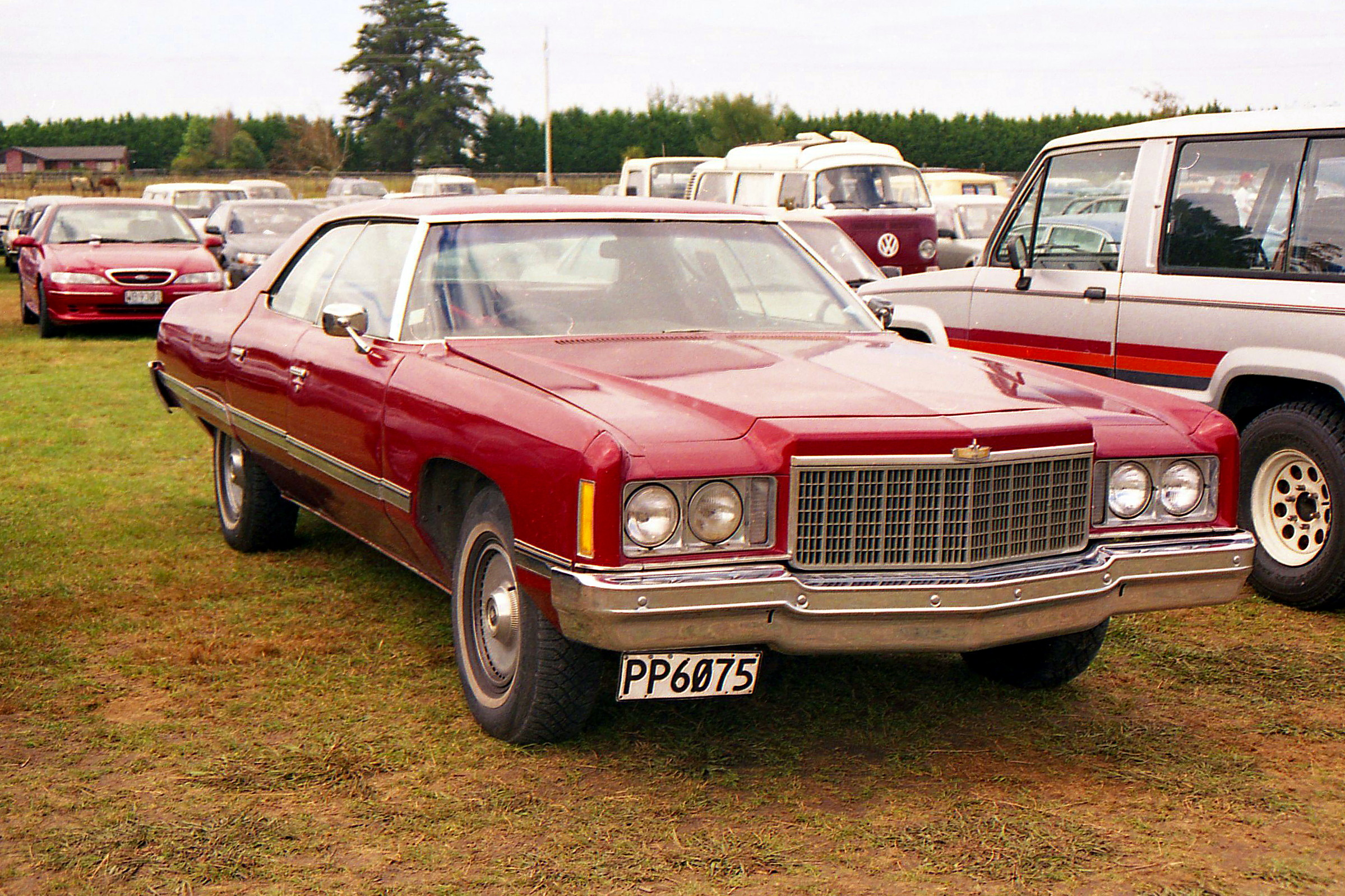
1974 Chevrolet Caprice Classic Sports Sedan

The Caprice models were renamed to Caprice Classic for the 1973 model year. The Kingswood Estate model with simulated wood-grain body side trim was now named the Caprice Estate. The convertible was moved from the Impala to the Caprice lineup for the first time in 1973.

The 1973 facelift included a new cross-hatch grille, 5 mph (8 km/h) energy-absorbing front bumper and revised square taillights, again mounted in the bumper. New emission standards added EGR (exhaust gas recirculation) valves to engines (with a new roller camshaft), and horsepower ratings were reduced. The standard Turbo-Fire 400 cu in (6.6 L) two-barrel was now rated at 150 hp (112 kW) while the only optional engine was the Turbo-Jet 454 cu in (7.4 L) V8 produced 245 hp (183 kW) with dual exhaust 215 hp (160 kW) with single exhaust used in station wagons. A new option on sedans and coupes was a 50/50 bench seat with recliner on the passenger side. The instrument panel and steering wheel were now offered in a variety of colors to harmonize the interior, and the wheel featured a new "soft-grip" rim. Front seats were also re-positioned to give more legroom for taller drivers, but shorter people found the driving position awkward.

The 1974 models featured a new formal, upright grille while turn signals moved from the bumper and were now inset of the dual headlights. The taillights were moved above the new 5 mph (8 km/h) rear bumper. New thick "B" pillars and fixed rear quarter opera windows were new on two-door coupes, which essentially eliminated pillar-less hardtop design much like the GM intermediates did the previous year. Other body styles including the four-door pillared and hardtop sedans, convertible and Estate Wagon were carried over with only minor changes from 1973. New to the engine roster was a four-barrel version of the small block 400 cubic-inch Turbo Fire V8 rated at 180 hp (134 kW) (which was the standard engine on wagons and all cars sold in California, optional on other models in 49 states). All other engines were carried over from 1973 although the 454 Turbo Jet lost 10 horsepower (7.5 kW), now rated at 235 hp (175 kW) Also new for 1974 were integrated lap and shoulder seat belts and an "interlock" system required the driver and front seat passengers to fasten seat belts to be able to start the engine. The interlock feature proved so unpopular that Congress rescinded it shortly after the introduction of the 1975 models. A new option this year was a remote control for the passenger-side outside rear-view mirror.

=== 1975–1976 ===
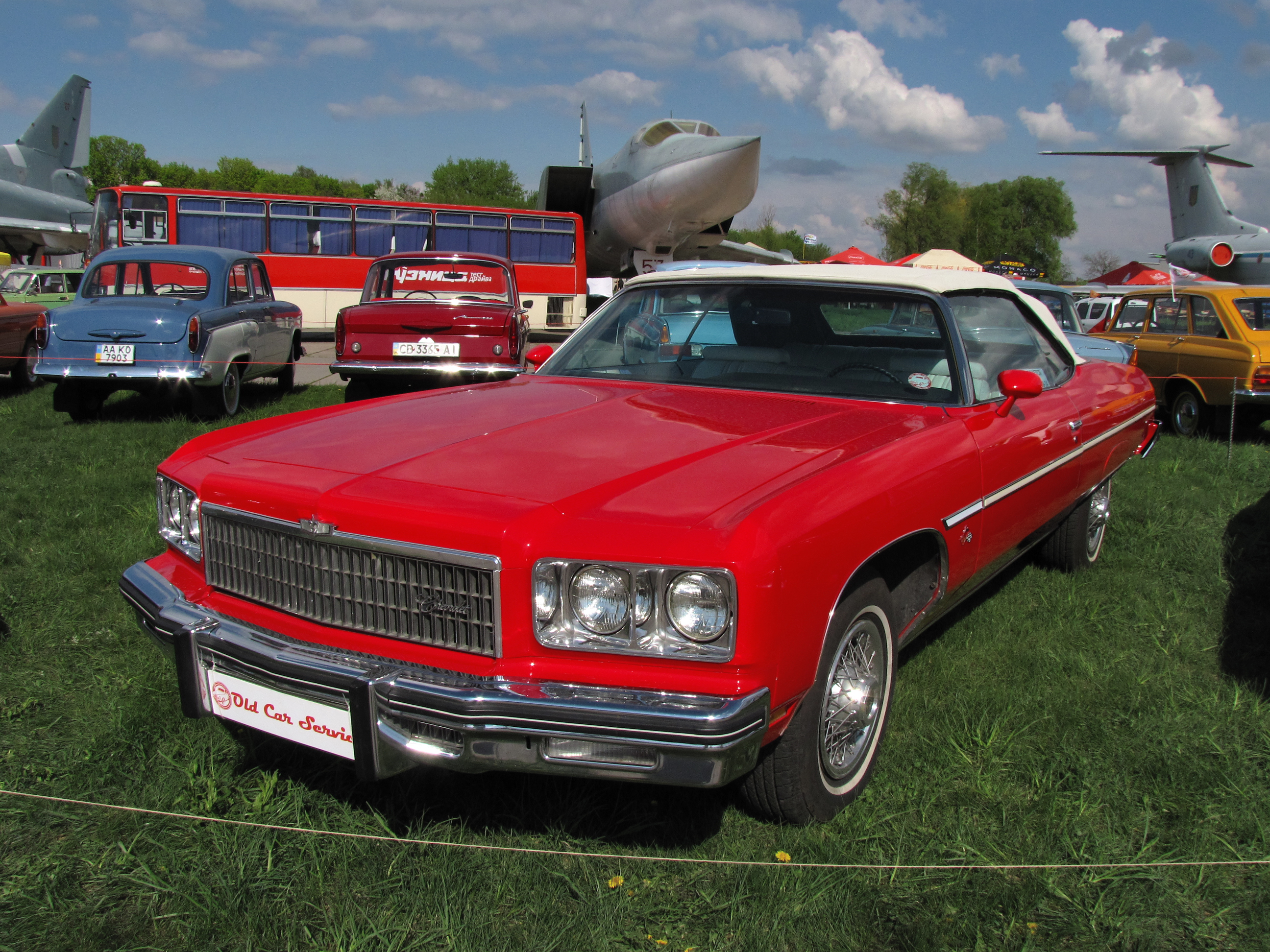
1975 Chevrolet Caprice Classic convertible

The 1975 models received a new front end with swept-back headlights, revised grille, and turn signals returned to the bumper which also angles backward at both ends. New taillights now wrap around rear fenders. Caprice Classic Sport sedans now feature opera windows in the C-pillars. The dashboard, radio and climate control graphics were revised; the speedometer read up to 100 mph (160 km/h), and had smaller numbers for kilometers per hour. The Caprice convertible would be discontinued after the 1975 model year along with its full-size B-body counterparts including the Oldsmobile Delta 88, Buick Centurion, and Pontiac Grand Ville. About 8,350 Caprice Classic convertibles found buyers in 1975.

As fuel economy became a bigger priority among Americans following the Arab Oil Embargo of late 1973 and early 1974, Chevy made the smaller 145 hp (108 kW) 350 cu in (5.7 L) small block V8 with two-barrel carburetor standard on all Caprice models except wagons for 1975. In California, the four-barrel 155 hp (116 kW) 350 V8 was the base engine and this engine was unavailable elsewhere. Optional engines included the 175 hp (130 kW) 400 cu in (6.6 L) small block V8 (standard on wagons) and 215 hp (160 kW) 454 cu in (7.4 L) big block, the last was not available in California. All engines except for the 454 were single exhaust systems with the introduction of the catalytic converter. Station wagons that used the 454 now featured dual exhaust as well. Also introduced this year were GM's "High Energy" electronic ignition and radial tires that were advertised as part of "Chevrolet's New Efficiency System." The theme of economy continued through to the new options this year: A new "Econominder" gauge package included a temperature gauge and a "fuel econominder", the second being a gauge alerting drivers as to when their driving habits caused the engine to use more or less fuel. Also new on the options list: intermittent windshield wipers, and 50/50 seating options on the Impala coupe/sedan and Caprice Classic convertible models.

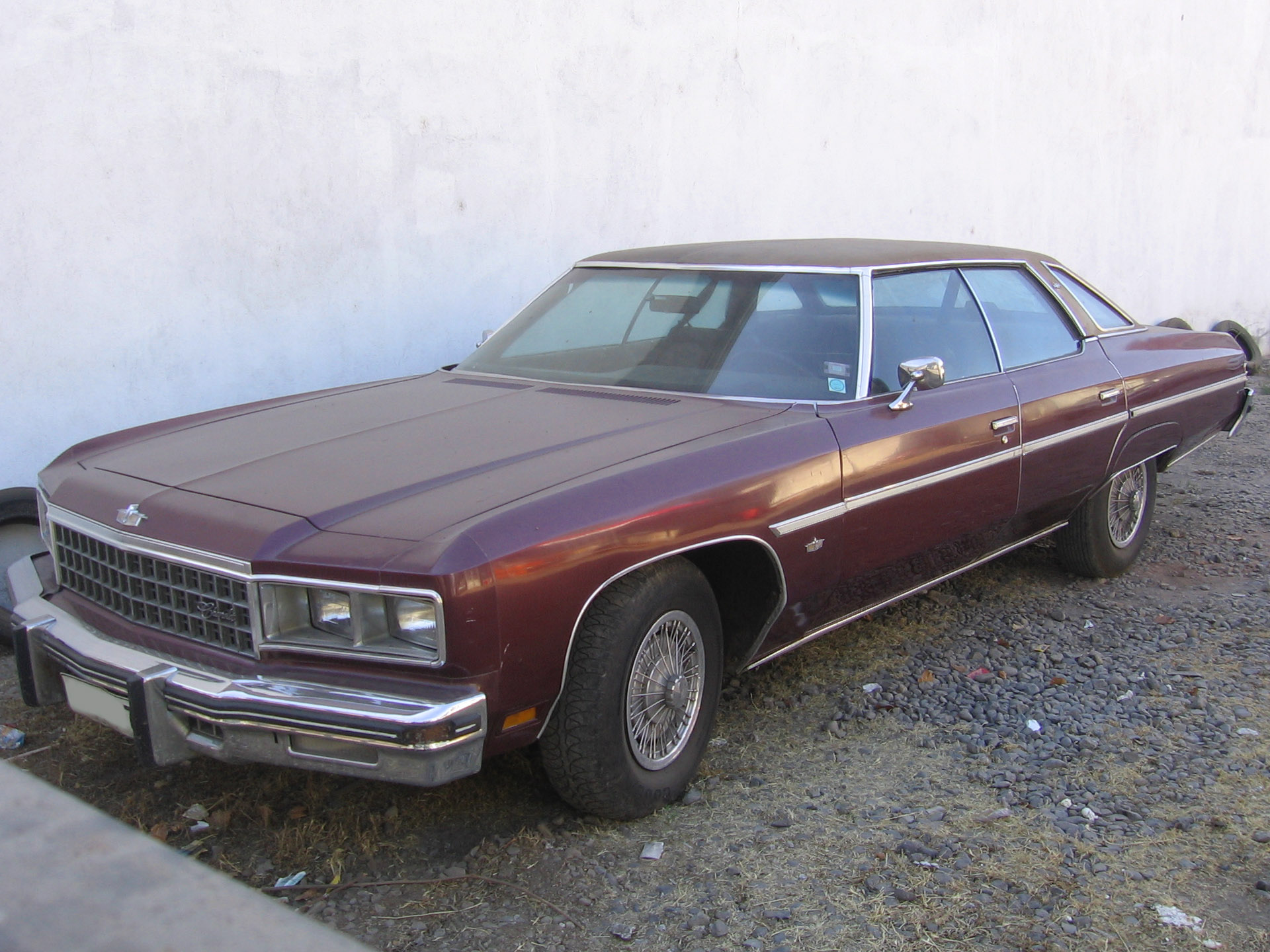
1976 Chevrolet Caprice Classic Sport Sedan

"Landau" model was also introduced in 1975, and was primarily an appearance package. Carried over unchanged into 1976, the Landau featured a choice of special paint colors, sports-styled dual remote outside rear-view mirrors, color-keyed wheel covers, a landau vinyl roof (with chrome band across the roof), a vinyl bodyside molding insert, and pinstriping. Inside there were color-keyed seat belts and floor mats. Fender and dashboard emblems rounded out the package. With minor changes, the Landau model would be carried over into the 1977 generation coupe models.

The 1976 Caprice Classic marked the sixth and final year of a body style introduced for the 1971 model year. 1976 models weighed approximately 4,314 pounds (1,957 kg) and was 222.9 inches (5,660 mm) long, growing considerably from the 1971s 4,040 pounds (1,830 kg) and 216.8-inch (5,510 mm) length. Only minor changes were made for 1976, including an eggcrate grille similar to that of the 1976 Cadillac Calais/DeVille/Fleetwood flanked by new rectangular headlights, along with revised exterior and interior trimmings. Engine options remained virtually unchanged with the 350 two-barrel remained standard in everywhere but California where the 350 four-barrel was standard. The only change was the 350 four-barrel was available in sedans and coupes nationwide and rated at 165 hp (123 kW). The dual exhaust equipped 454 increased 10 hp (7.5 kW), rated at 225 hp (168 kW) and was still unavailable in California. Also available was the 180 hp (134 kW) four-barrel 400 V8 standard on wagons and optional on all other models. This was the final year for the big block 454 V8 to be offered, along with hardtop body styles and the clam shell-tailgate design for the station wagon. The 1976 4-door hardtop Sport Sedan was the last pillarless model offered by Chevrolet; it was offered in both the Caprice Classic and Impala series. All subsequent Caprice passenger cars were pillared sedans and coupes.

== Third generation (1977–1990) ==
Third generation
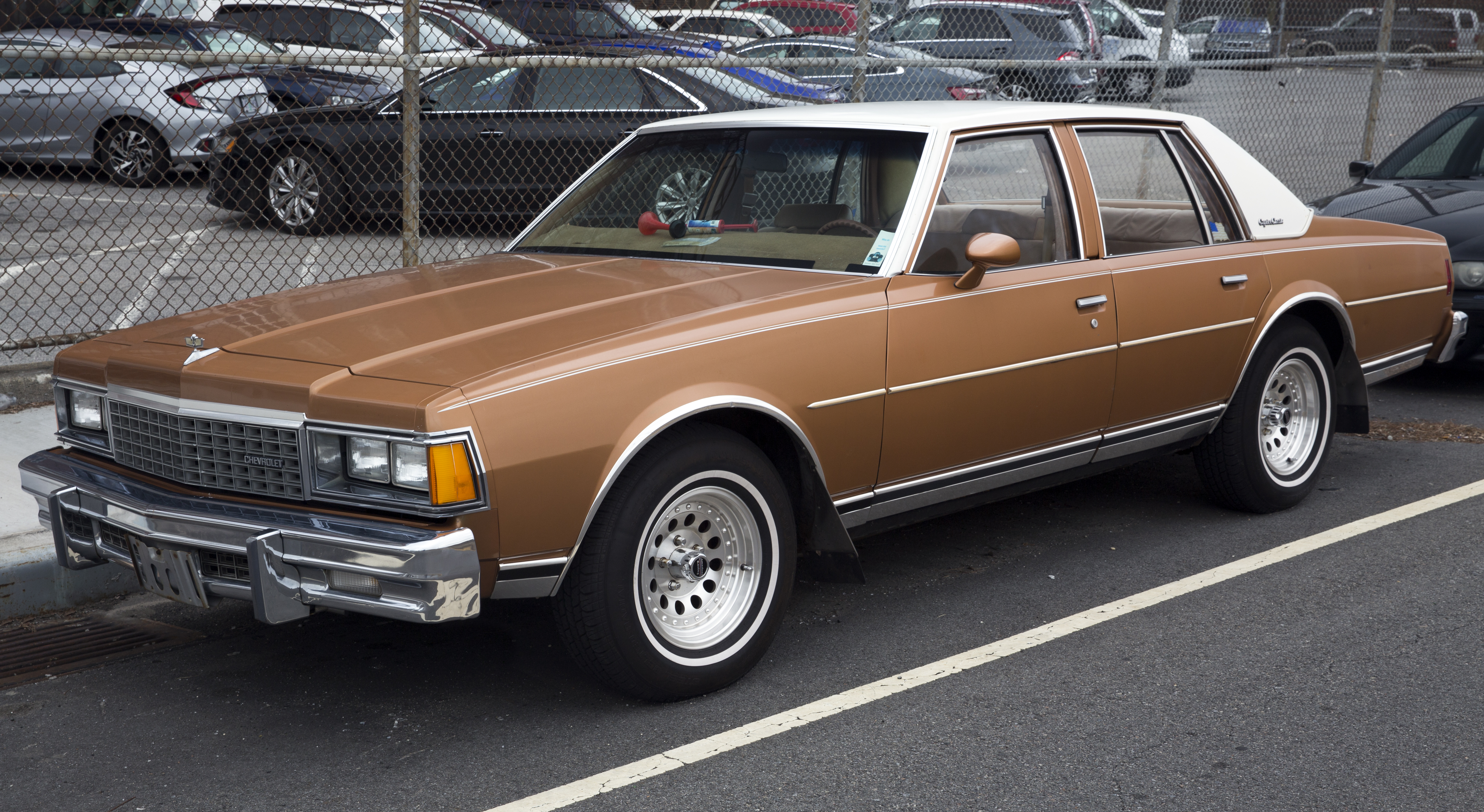
- 1978 Chevrolet Caprice Classic

Overview
- Production: September 1976 – August 1990
- Model years: 1977–1990
- Assembly: Arlington Assembly, Arlington, Texas, United States (1988–1990); Detroit, Michigan, United States – Clark Street (1986–1987); Fairfax Assembly, Kansas City, Kansas, U.S. (1982–1987); Flint, Michigan, United States - Buick City (1984–1985); Janesville Assembly, Janesville, Wisconsin, United States (1977–1982); Lakewood Assembly, Lakewood Heights, Atlanta, Georgia, United States (1987–1990); South Gate Assembly, South Gate, California, United States (1977–1980); St. Louis Truck Assembly, St. Louis, Missouri (1977–1980); Wilmington Assembly, Wilmington, Delaware, United States (1985–1986); Oshawa Car Assembly, Oshawa, Ontario, Canada (1977–1985); Valencia, Venezuela
- Designer: Bill Mitchell

Body and chassis
- Body style: 4-door sedan; 4-door station wagon; 2-door coupe
- Related: (sedan); Buick LeSabre; Chevrolet Impala; Oldsmobile 88; Pontiac Bonneville; Pontiac Parisienne; Pontiac Catalina; Pontiac Laurentian; (station wagon); Buick Estate; Oldsmobile Custom Cruiser; Pontiac Safari

Powertrain
- Engine: 250 cu in (4.1 L) Turbo-Thrift I6; 229 cu in (3.8 L) Chevrolet 90° V6; 262 cu in (4.3 L) Chevrolet 90° V6; 267 cu in (4.4 L) Small-block V8; 305 cu in (5.0 L) Small-block V8; 307 cu in (5.0 L) Oldsmobile V8; 350 cu in (5.7 L) Small-block V8; 350 cu in (5.7 L) Oldsmobile Diesel V8
- Transmission: 3-speed automatic; 4-speed automatic

Dimensions
- Wheelbase: 116 in (2,946 mm)
- Length: 215.7 in (5,479 mm) (wagon); 212.2 in (5,390 mm) (sedan); 212.1 in (5,387 mm) (1981–82); 212.8 in (5,405 mm) (1985–89)
- Width: 79.3 in (2,014 mm) (wagon); 75.4 in (1,915 mm) (sedan)
- Height: 58.2 in (1,478 mm) (wagon); 56.4 in (1,433 mm) (sedan)

=== 1977–1979 ===
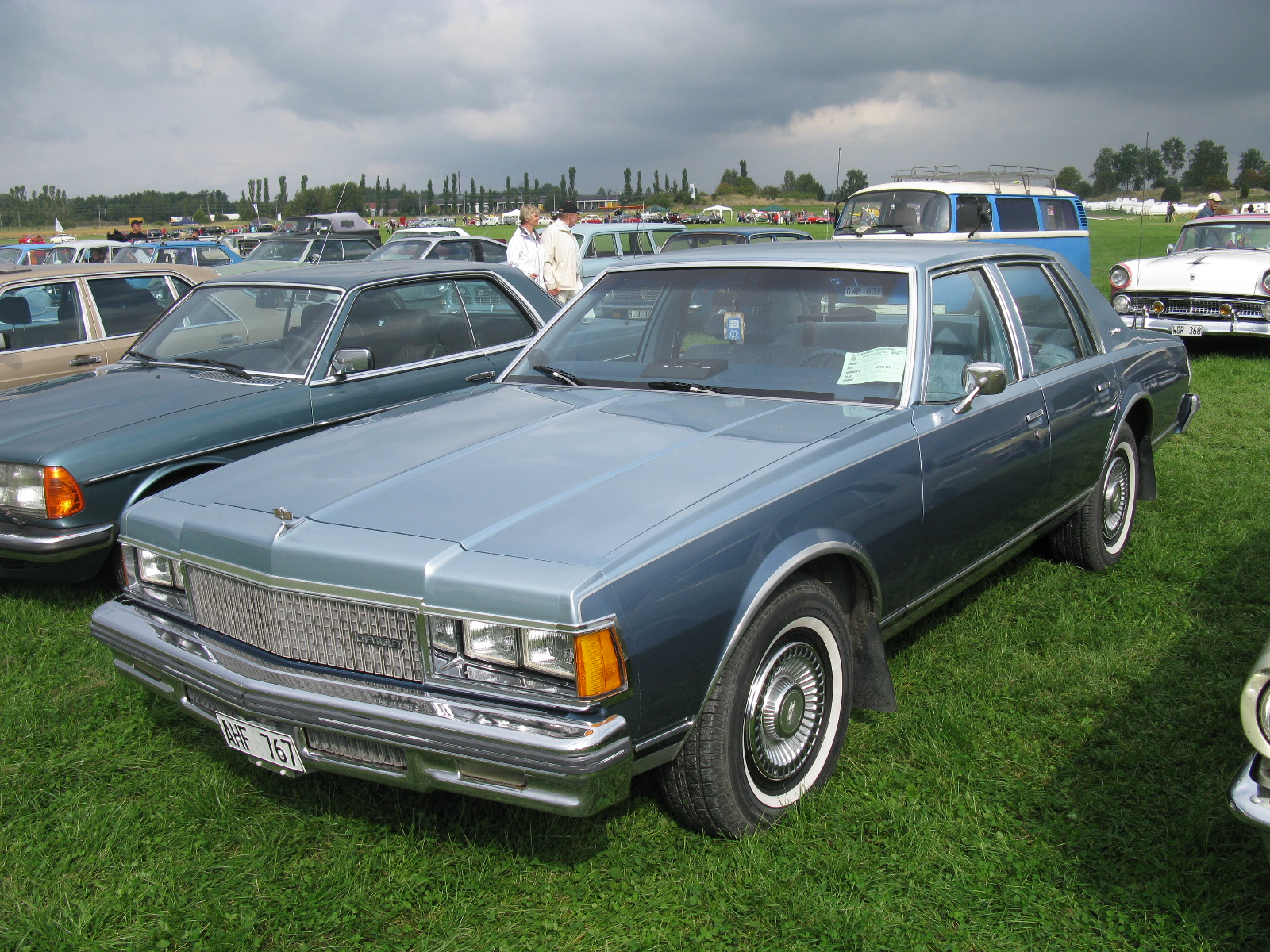
1977 Chevrolet Caprice Classic Sedan

Launched in late September 1976, the 1977 Caprice Classic was drastically downsized, which reduced its weight and exterior dimensions, while increasing headroom, rear-seat legroom and trunk space compared to 1976 models. GM called its downsizing program Project 77 and invested $600 million to develop the most changed full-size Chevrolet to date. The weight reductions from the 1976 models were 611 lb (277 kg) for coupes, 637 lb (289 kg) for sedans and 871 lb (395 kg) for wagons. The 1977 Caprice coupe and sedan were over 10 inches (250 mm) shorter while the wagon was 14 inches (360 mm) shorter. Wheelbases were reduced to 116 inches (2,900 mm) from 121.5 inches (3,090 mm) for coupes and sedans and 125 inches (3,200 mm) for wagons. Width was reduced by 4 inches (100 mm) for sedans and coupes; the wagon's width remained virtually unchanged. Heights were increased by 2.5 inches (64 mm) and trunk capacities were increased to 20.9 cubic feet (0.59 m^{3}) for sedans and 19.8 cubic feet (0.56 m^{3}) for coupes.

Although by modern standards the downsized Chevrolet cars are large, the new Chevrolet had exterior dimensions closer to the intermediates of its day. The 1977 Caprice shared the same 116-inch (2,900 mm) wheelbase as the intermediate Chevrolet Chevelle; 1977 also marked the first model year in history that a midsized car, the Monte Carlo, was larger than a full-sized car. The introduction of a downsized full-size car was considered a risk for General Motors. To help ensure the car was a success, preview clinics were held by Chevrolet that returned positive results.

Ford would respond with advertising the Ford LTD's traditional full-size attributes and downsized the line two years later. Chrysler responded concurrently with Ford when it re-engineered its intermediate B-body cars and designated them as full-size R-bodies.

1977 models included a four-door sedan, two-door sedan, six-passenger two-seat station wagon, and an eight-passenger three-seat station wagon. All models had framed windows; no hardtop was offered.

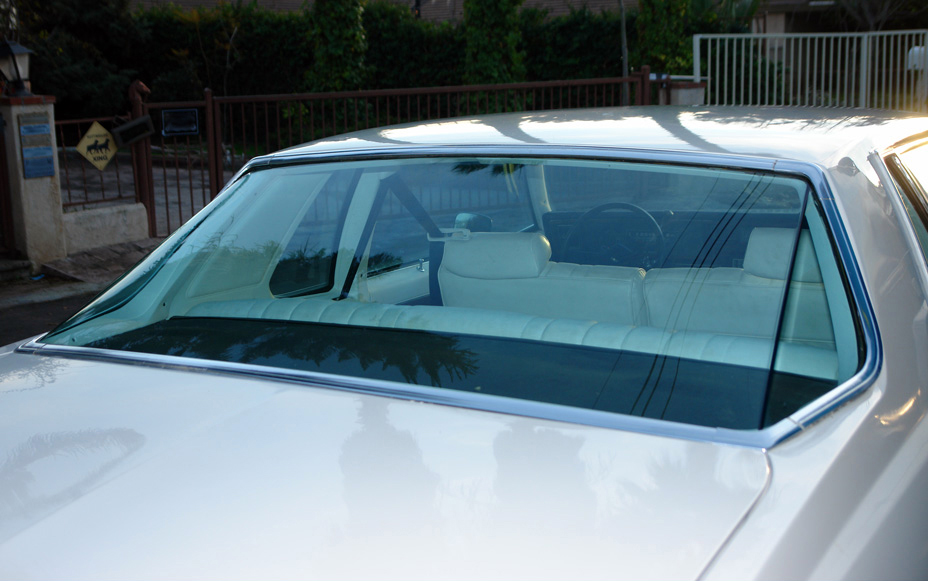
Rear Window used on 1977–79 Caprice coupe (1978 model shown)

Two-door models featured a unique rear window that created a semi-fastback appearance. This glass had sharp corners giving it three sides. This was done through a "hot-wire" bending process. The Caprice was available as either the "Sport Coupe" or as the "Landau Coupe". The Landau Coupe features a partially covered vinyl roof.

Station wagon models received a new three-way tailgate for 1977; the clamshell design was gone. The three-seat models featured a rear-facing third seat for two occupants giving these cars an eight-passenger capacity. The cargo capacity was reduced to 87 cubic feet (2,500 L), and although the station wagon could still carry a 4 ft × 8 ft (1.2 m × 2.4 m) sheet of plywood, this could now only be done with the tailgate down. The station wagons use a coil spring suspension in the rear as with sedans and coupes.

A V8 engine was no longer standard equipment - the base engine for 1977 Caprice coupes and sedans was Chevy's long-running 250 cu in (4.1 L) I6 engine rated at 110 hp (82 kW). This engine was previously available in a full-size Chevy in the 1973 lower trim Bel Air. Standard on station wagons and optional on other Caprice models was a 145 hp (108 kW) 2-barrel 305 cu in (5.0 L) version of the Chevy's small-block V8. This was the first model year the 305 cu in had been used in a full-size Chevrolet; it was first introduced in 1976 in compact and mid-sized Chevrolet lines. A 170 hp (127 kW) 350 cu in (5.7 L) V8 with four-barrel carburetor was now the top engine offering as the larger 400 cu in (6.6 L) and 454 cu in (7.4 L) V8s were discontinued. Standard for all models was the three-speed Turbo Hydra-Matic automatic transmission.

With the new lighter weight and smaller engines, Chevrolet promised increase fuel economy without great loss of performance compared to 1976 models. The EPA estimates for 1977 Chevrolet was 17 miles per US gallon (14 L/100 km; 20 mpg_{‑imp}) city and 22 miles per US gallon (11 L/100 km; 26 mpg_{‑imp}) highway for six-cylinder models. Ford's 1977 LTD was rated at 15 miles per US gallon (16 L/100 km; 18 mpg_{‑imp}) city and 19 miles per US gallon (12 L/100 km; 23 mpg_{‑imp}) highway with its smallest engine, the 302 cu in (4.9 L) V8. By the same EPA estimates, Plymouth's Gran Fury returned 13 MPG city and 18 MPG highway with the 318 V8. Performance was good when comparing the smaller 1977 Caprice to the 1976 Caprice. A 1976 350 two-bbl powered Chevrolet ran 0–60 mph in 12.9 seconds, while a 400 powered model ran 10.7 seconds. 1977 models ran 11.4 seconds to 60 mph (97 km/h) with the 305 engine and 10.8 seconds with the 350 engine. Car and Driver tested a 1977 Chevrolet Impala with the 350 engine and 3.08:1 axle running a 9.6 second 0–60 mph time and obtaining a 117 mph (188 km/h) top speed. The 350 was available with a 2.56:1 axle ratio and a 3.08 axle ratio which may explain the difference in performance times.

The 1977 models became the number one selling car in the United States. (In 1976, the previous generation full-size Chevrolet was the third best-seller). More than 660,000 full-size Chevrolets were produced for the 1977 model year, with the most popular model being the four-door Caprice Classic sedan (212,840 produced). By 1978 more than 1 million downsized Chevrolets had been produced. Auto publications agreed with the public reception, with Motor Trend awarding the 1977 Chevrolet Caprice Car of the Year.

Car and Driver declared "Even the most jaded car critics are in fact tripping over each other trying to be the first to anoint this sedan to be the best full-sized Chevrolet ever made." Car and Driver commented on the F41 suspension option which included stiffer springs, larger sway bars, wheels, and tires to say, "It will make you think your Chevy came from the Black Forest instead of Detroit."

1978 models had minor front and rear styling revisions. The engine line-up remained unchanged, but numerically lower axle ratios were used in an attempt to boost fuel economy. The 305 and 350 engines went from a standard 2.56:1 axle for 1977 (2.73:1 for wagons), to a 2.41:1 axle for 1978 (2.56:1 for wagons). An optional 3.08 axle was also available for 350 powered Caprices. The 305 V8 engine received an aluminum intake manifold which reduced engine weight by 35 pounds. A larger brake booster was also added to help reduce braking effort. New options included a steel sliding moonroof and 40-channel CB radio built into the AM/FM radio.

The 1979 models continued with only minor refinements. One major change was the relocation of the reverse lights to the bumper filler panels right below the taillights. Again the front and rear styling was refreshed slightly. The 250 six gained five horsepower, while the 305 V8 lost 15 hp (11 kW). The change to the 305 was a result of switching from the larger Rochester 2GC carburetor to the smaller Rochester Dualjet carburetor. The 350 engine was unchanged.

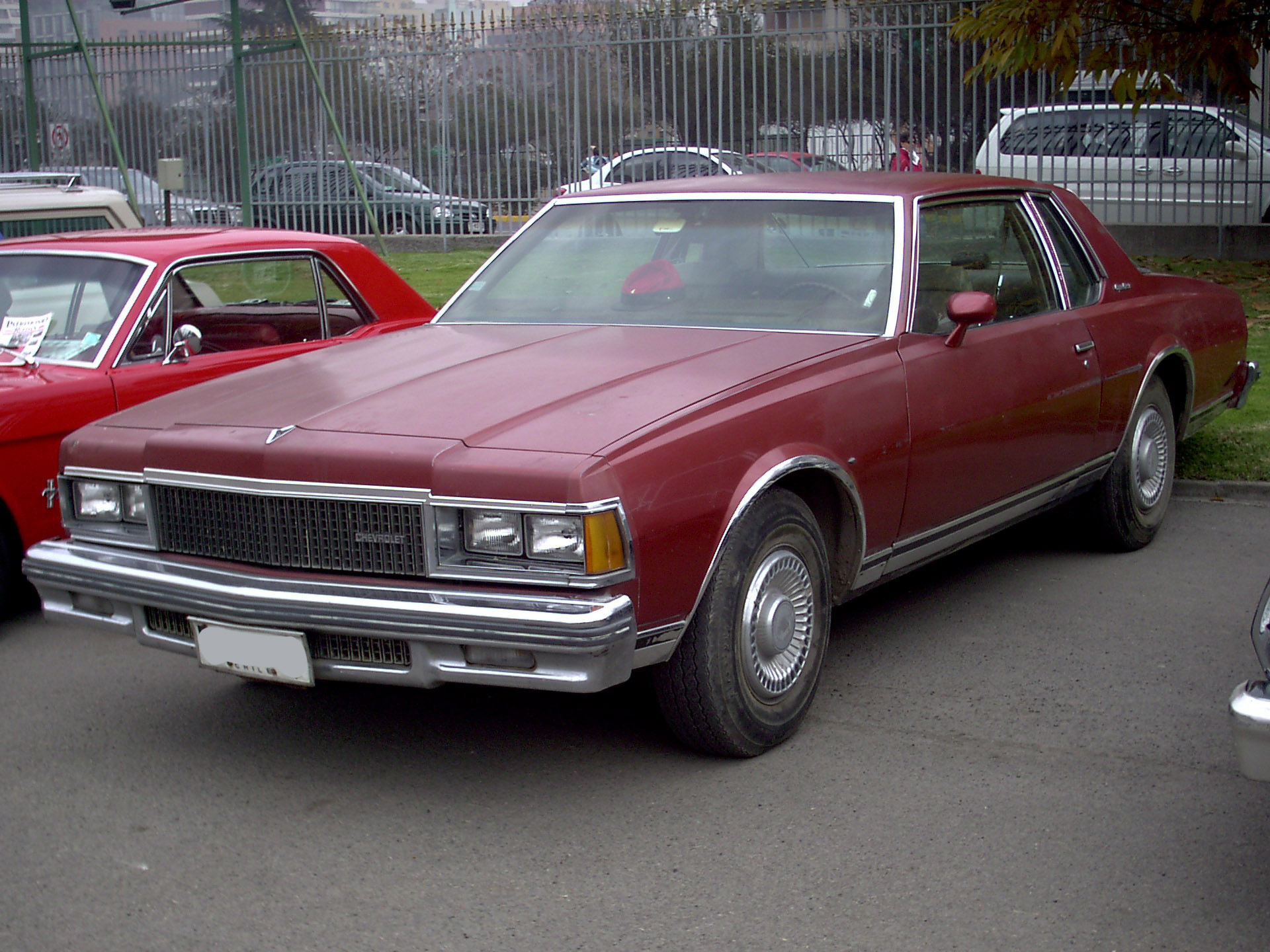
1978 Caprice coupe

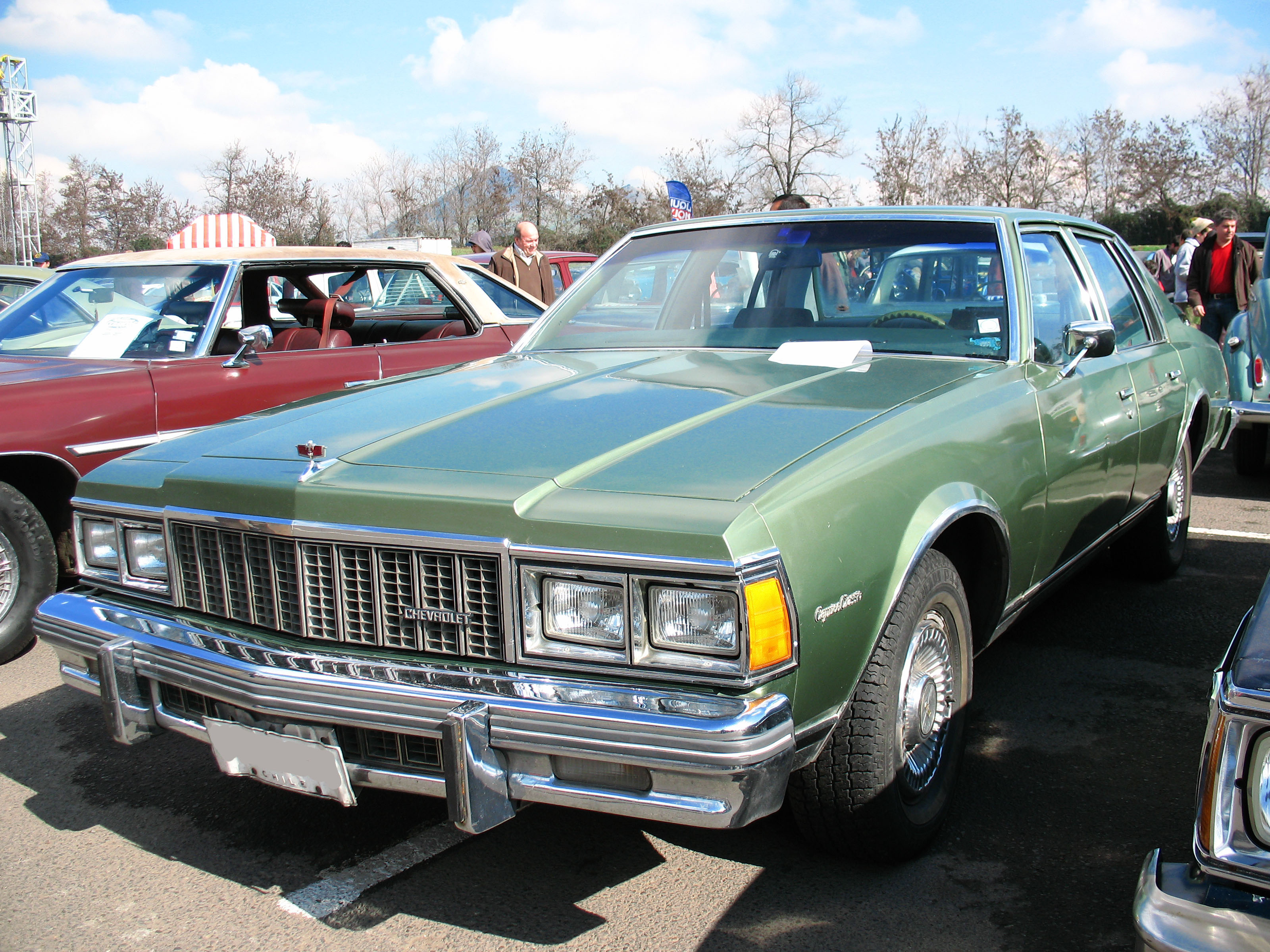
1979 Chevrolet Caprice Classic Sedan

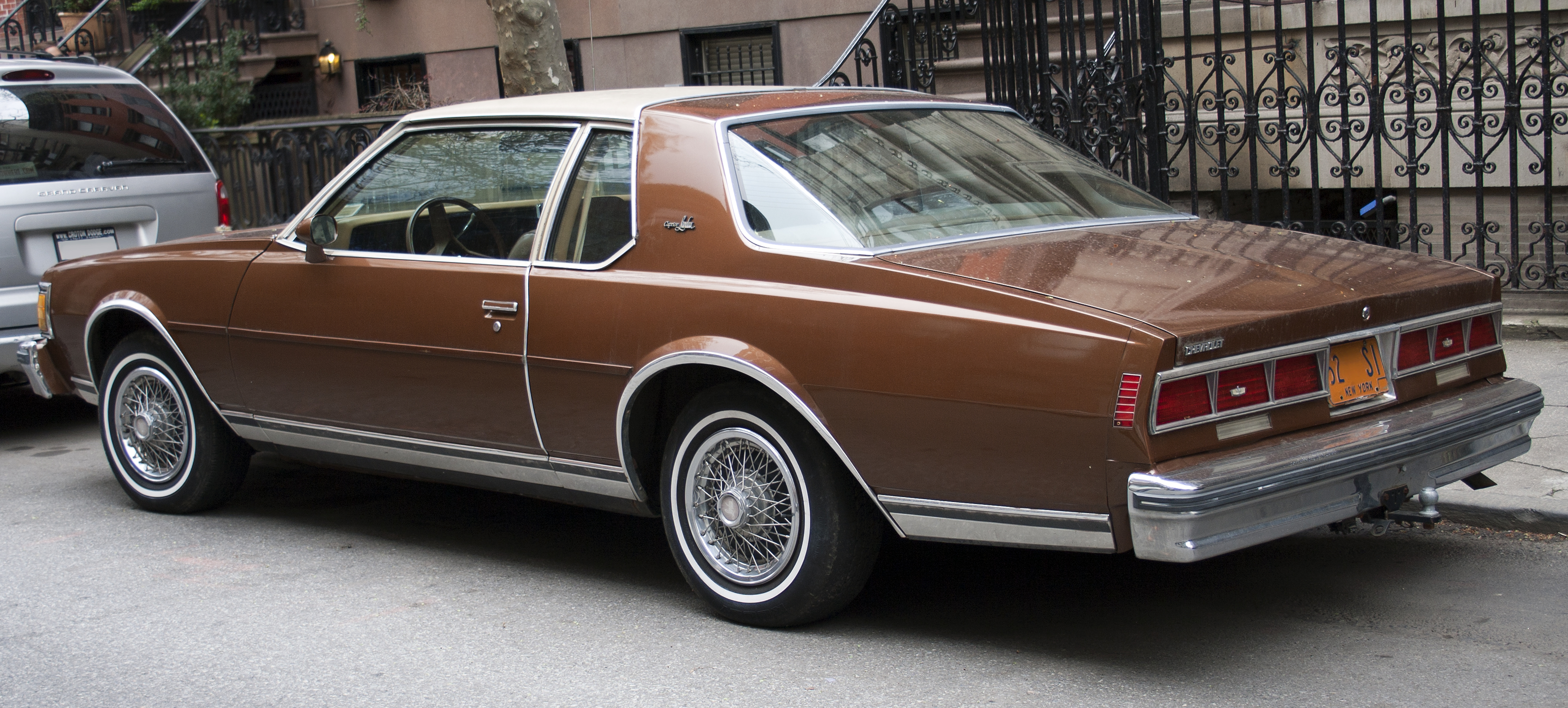
1979 Caprice Classic Landau coupe

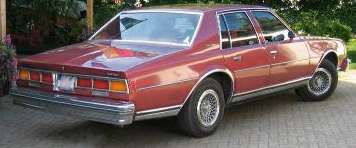
1979 Caprice Classic sedan (export model)

=== 1980–1985 ===
The 1980 Caprice Classic saw its first major revision since the 1977 downsizing. To further improve the fuel economy of the car, efforts were made to reduce weight and improve aerodynamics. The Caprice received new exterior sheet metal, without drastically changing the look of the car. To improve aerodynamics the hood was tapered lower, while the trunk area was higher. The coupe's distinctive curved rear window was replaced with a nearly flat piece of glass, giving the model a more formal profile similar to that of the sedan. The grille was now an egg crate style while the tail-light panel featured three separate square lights per side. All the doors and components within were redesigned to be lighter, including the window-crank mechanisms, which now used a tape-drive mechanism. Greater use of aluminum including in-bumper reinforcement and in-sedan/coupe radiators helped to further reduce the overall weight of the vehicle. 1980 models were approximately 100 pounds (45 kg) lighter than 1979 models.

The new styling increased the trunk capacity of both coupes and sedans to 20.9 cubic feet (592 L). This increase was also partially achieved with a now-standard compact spare tire on a 16-inch (410 mm) wheel. A new frame lift jack replaced the bumper-mounted model. A larger 25 US gallons (95 L; 21 imp gal) fuel tank was standard equipment in sedans and coupes. Easy-roll radial tires, improved anti-corrosion measures, low-friction ball joints, and larger front-suspension bushings were also new for 1980. Puncture-sealant tires and cornering lights were new options.

The 250 cu in (4.1 L) inline-six was replaced by a new 90-degree Chevrolet 3.8 L (229 cu in) V6 as the base engine for sedans and coupes. This engine shared the same bore and stroke as the 305 cu in V8. California emission cars used the Buick 3.8 L (231 cu in) V6 engine. The Chevrolet 3.8 L was rated at 115 hp (86 kW) while the Buick V6 engine had a 110 hp (82 kW) rating. Although the 3.8 L V6 had the same horsepower rating as the 250 six used in 1979, the 250 had 25 lb⋅ft (34 N⋅m) more torque than the 3.8 L (200 lb·ft vs 175 lb·ft). The 3.8 L V6 did boost Chevrolet Caprice's fuel economy to an EPA estimated 20 miles per US gallon (12 L/100 km; 24 mpg_{‑imp}) city and 29 miles per US gallon (8.1 L/100 km; 35 mpg_{‑imp}) highway, the highest a full-size Chevrolet had been rated to date.

The base-V8 engine was new for 1980. The 267 cu in (4.4 L) V8 rated at 115 hp (86 kW) and was the standard engine for station wagons. This engine had a Rochester Dualjet carburetor and was not available in California. The two-barrel carburetor on the 305 cu in (5.0 L) V8 was replaced with a four-barrel, increasing the 305's output to 155 hp (116 kW). This was now the most powerful engine option (standard on California station wagons), as the 350 cu in (5.7 L) V8 was no longer available except as part of the police-package option. The Oldsmobile-built 350 cu in Diesel V8 was added to the option list for station wagons. This engine was rated at 105 hp (78 kW) and 205 lb⋅ft (278 N⋅m). To further increase fuel economy, all transmissions were equipped with an electronically controlled lock-up torque converter clutch.

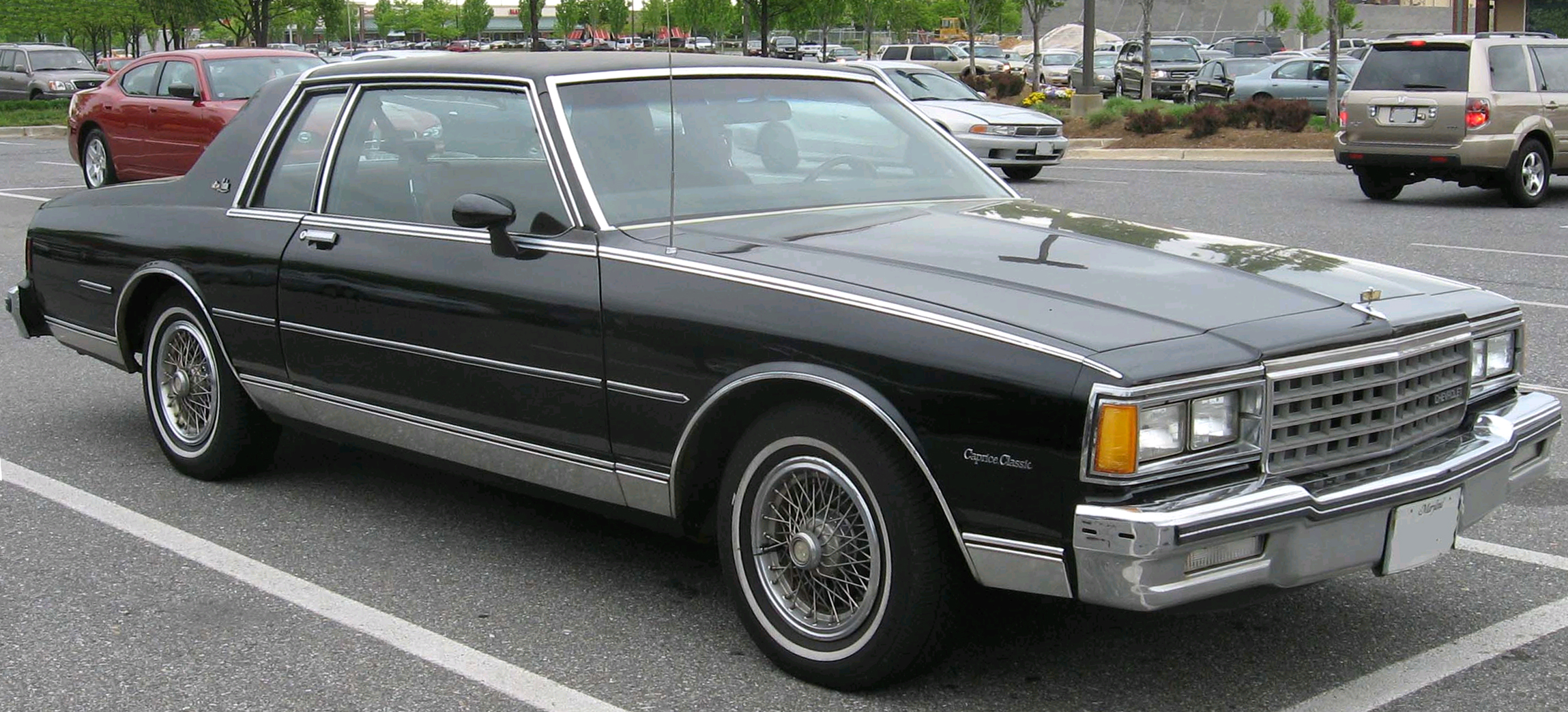
1981–1985 Caprice Classic Landau coupe

1981 models saw only minor revisions. Styling was unchanged other than the grille which remained egg crate style but now had larger sections. Refinements included redesigned front disc brakes for less drag and a translucent plastic master cylinder reservoir. The cruise control became equipped with a resume feature, while wire-wheel covers had locking bolts to secure them in place. This was the last year for the Delco GM 40-channel CB radio built into the AM/FM radio option.

The engine line-up remained unchanged, although the 229 cu in (3.8 L) V6 was now rated at 110 hp (82 kW) and the 305 cu in (5.0 L) V8 was rated at 150 hp (112 kW). All engines were updated with the Computer Command Control (CCC) system which included an electronically metered carburetor. This change occurred in 1980 for California emission cars and did not occur to Canadian emission cars until 1987. The Oldsmobile-built 350 cu in Diesel V8 was added to the option list for the coupe and sedan models during the model year.

1982 models saw only minor styling revisions. The model line-up was reduced by one, with the Caprice Landau coupe dropped. Remaining were the sedan, sport coupe, six-passenger wagon, and the eight-passenger wagon. A new four-speed automatic overdrive transmission with a lock-up torque converter joined the powertrain line-up. This transmission helped boost highway fuel economy, while improving city performance with a 3.08:1 rear axle ratio. The overdrive transmission was only available with the 305 cu in V8, and was a mandatory option for this engine.

The engine line-up and power ratings remained unchanged, excepting the 305 V8 which now claimed 145 hp (108 kW) at 4,000 rpm. The 350 cubic-inch Diesel V8 engine was now available on all models. With the 1979 energy crisis long over, sales of the full-sized Caprice were strong: with barely any marketing and no rebating, the Caprice's share of Chevrolet sales more than doubled since the year before; it was the third best-selling Chevrolet (behind the Citation and Chevette) and was outselling the new Celebrity by three-to-one.

1983 was marked with the fewest models to date. No two-door models were produced, leaving only the four-door and the eight-passenger station wagon, since the 6-passenger wagon also left the line-up. The 267 cu in (4.4 L) engine was discontinued, but all other engines remained unchanged. The 305 cu in engine and the automatic overdrive transmission was standard on station wagons. The 350 cu in diesel was available with the automatic overdrive transmission at extra cost, while the 305 cu in V8 came equipped only with the automatic overdrive transmission. The 1983 Chevrolet Caprice Classic was selected on the Car and Driver Ten Best list.

The 1984 model year saw the return of the two-door sport coupe making a three model line-up. Styling remained unchanged. 1984 models were virtually identical to the 1981 models. The windshield washer controls were moved from the dashboard to the turn signal stalk to create the multi-stalk. The optional cruise control (which continued to be mounted on the turn signal stalk) now featured acceleration/deceleration in 1 mph (1.6 km/h) increments. An optional Landau package included a vinyl roof, sport mirrors, and reveal moldings.

Powertrain availability and power ratings were unchanged for 1984. The 350 cu in diesel engine came standard with an automatic overdrive transmission when equipped in station wagons.

1983 saw the introduction of a Caprice clone from Canada, the Pontiac Parisienne. While this car bore Pontiac emblems and trim similar to the pre-1982 Bonneville, it was a Caprice in every other way. Pontiac dealers gained a full-size car again and buyers did not seem to mind that the car was virtually the same as the contemporary Caprice. It sold well enough to remain available until 1986 for the sedan and 1989 for the Safari station wagon.

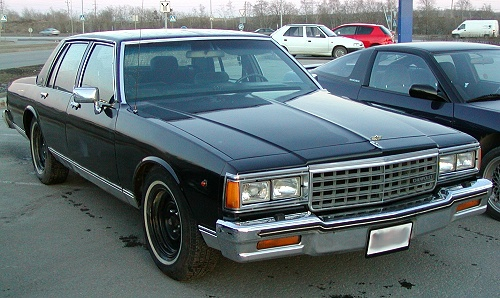
1985 Caprice Classic sedan (export model)

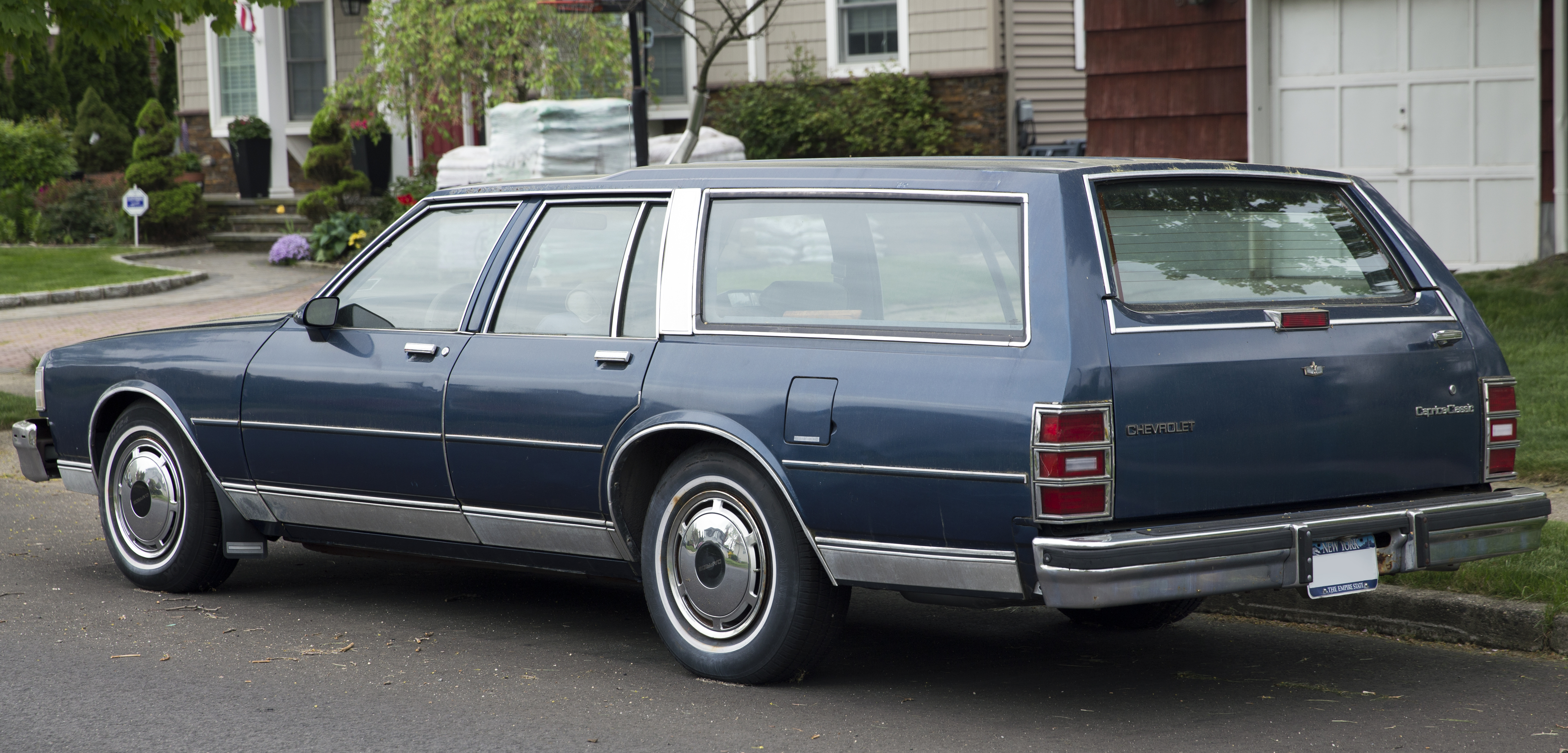
Caprice Classic Wagon (1988; rear view)

1985 models received minor updates while styling remained unchanged. The interior was updated for 1985, marking its most significant update since 1977. The simulated woodgrain appliqué used on the dash was replaced with a simulated silver metallic appliqué. The shaft-style radio was replaced with a more modern DIN-and-a-half style radio, while the pull-out headlight switch was replaced by a push-button style switch. The climate controls were updated with rotary switches for the fan and rear window defroster replacing the toggle style switches. The instruments were updated to have a more modern appearance, with a horizontal speedometer while a round speedometer was included with the optional gauge package.

The engine line-up saw major changes for 1985. The 4.3 L V6 engine (262 cu in) with throttle body fuel injection (RPO LB4) replaced both 3.8 L V6s in 1985 as the base engine for sedans and coupes. The 4.3 L engine was rated at 130 hp (97 kW) and 210 lb⋅ft (285 N⋅m), producing 20 hp (15 kW) more than the 229 cu in V6. The 4.3 L V6 shared its bore and stroke with the 350 cu in Chevrolet V8. This engine came standard with a three-speed automatic but was available with the four-speed automatic overdrive transmission. The 5.0 L 305 cu in V8 engine received an electronic spark control and compression was increased from 8.6:1 to 9.5:1. This caused the 305's output to jump to 165 hp (123 kW). The 350 cu in diesel engine remained unchanged until being dropped in January.

=== 1986–1990 ===
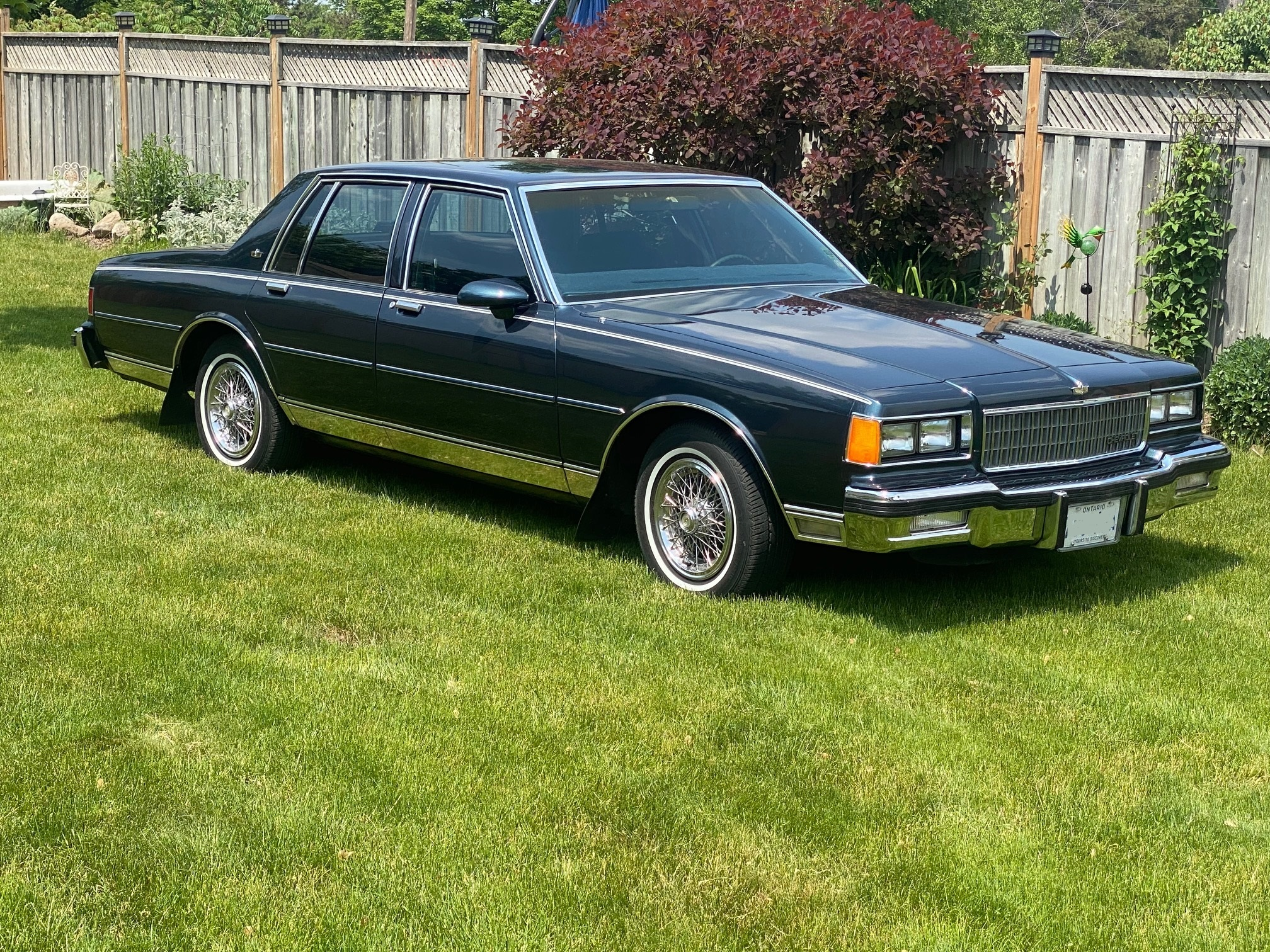
1986 Chevrolet Caprice Classic - Showing the updated look new for the '86 model year as well as the final year of sealed-beam headlamps

1986 marked the first major exterior restyle since 1980. From 1986 to 1990, the Caprice was the only sedan riding on the B platform; (except in Canada where Pontiac Parisienne remained as a sedan for 1986 and available as a safari wagon until 1989) all other sedans had been discontinued or transferred to the smaller, front-wheel-drive H platform. The front fascia was restyled to have a more aerodynamic look: the Caprice emblem was no longer a standup hood ornament, but was an emblem located on the vertical area directly above the grille in the center of the front fascia. A smaller grille with prominent vertical chrome divider bars replaced the larger previous egg-crate grille. The redesigned front end still had two side-by-side rectangular sealed beam headlamps, as had been used on the Caprice since 1976; the taillights were restyled, but continued to have three chambers—another long-running Caprice styling cue. New aerodynamic side-view mirrors were used. The car's sheetmetal remained otherwise unchanged.

The former Impala was rebranded as "Caprice" (without "Classic" appended), unifying all full-size Chevrolets under a single model name for the first time since the early 1930s. Still available was a Caprice Classic four-door sedan, coupe and eight-passenger station wagon, while a new Brougham four-door sedan joined the model line-up. Brougham models featured a 55/45 front seat with armrest, and a new "pillow design" with velour fabrics. Broughams featured woodgrain appliqué on its dash fascia, a dome map light, front-door courtesy lights and 20 oz carpeting. Power window controls for all models moved from the door panel to the armrest for improved ergonomics.

The 4.3 L V6 engine received a 10 hp (7.5 kW) boost, rated at 140 hp (104 kW). The 305 cu in engine was unchanged and remained standard on station wagons. Station wagons built after approximately November 1, 1985 came equipped with the Oldsmobile-built 307 cu in engine and the 305 cu in was no longer available in station wagons. This engine was used in all GM B-body station wagons from this point on to simplify production. The 307 was equipped with a four-barrel carburetor and was rated at 140 hp (104 kW) and 255 lb⋅ft (346 N⋅m). The 350 cu in diesel engine was discontinued.

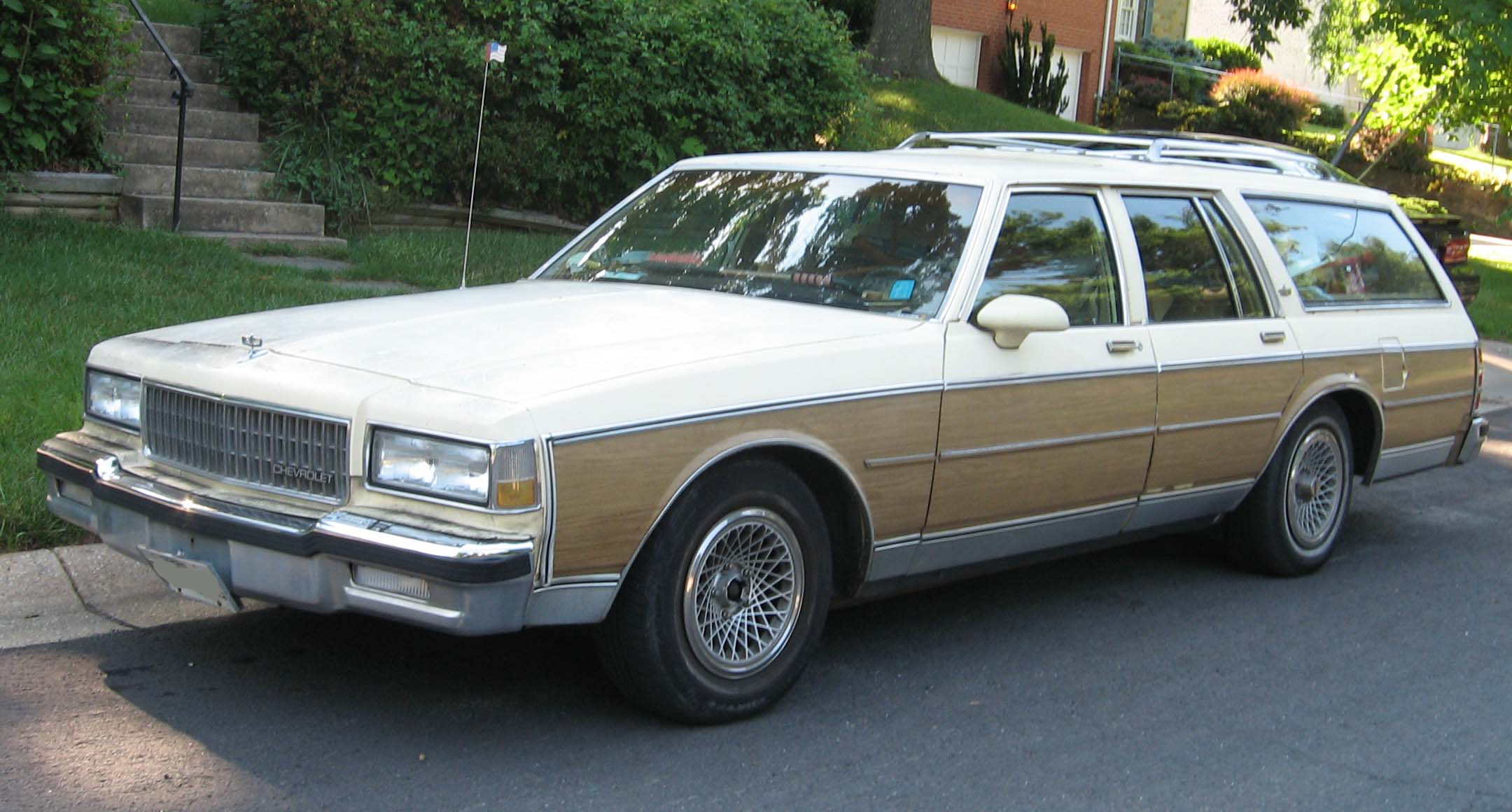
1987–1990 Caprice Estate wagon

The 1987 models received minor styling revisions: composite aerodynamic headlamps replaced the formerly sealed beam bulbs, and a standup hood ornament returned. A simulated woodgrain dashboard finish, last used on the 1984 models, returned. The model range was slightly revised, and now included a base level Caprice eight-passenger wagon and a Caprice Classic Brougham LS four-door sedan, introduced mid-1986. The Brougham LS featured all the Brougham amenities plus a fiberglass roof plug covered by a padded vinyl roof for a more formal look, opera lights, and LS monograms. Leather upholstery was a newly available option for Brougham and Brougham LS sedans, which also had a new pillow-style seating design and a folding center armrest in the back seat. Exterior colors for the Brougham LS were now limited to conservative colors compared to the 1986 model: White, Black, Burgundy, Dark Blue, and Dark Grey. The trim level names "stacked up": Caprice, Caprice Classic, Caprice Classic Brougham, and Caprice Classic Brougham LS in ascending order of price and plushness.

The engine offerings received only minor changes. The 4.3 L V6 and the 305 cu in V8 were updated with roller lifters and center bolt valve covers. The 305 cu in had a 5 hp (3.7 kW) rating increase and was now rated at 170 hp (127 kW) and 250 lb⋅ft (339 N⋅m). The 307 cu in Oldsmobile-built V8 remained unchanged and was the only available engine for the station wagons. Some Canadian-sold Chevrolet Caprice sedans used the 307 cu in Oldsmobile-built V8 in place of the Chevrolet-built 305 cu in engine during the 1987 model year.

The 1988 model range was revised, with the sport coupe dropped due to low sales. There was now just one station wagon model, an eight-passenger configuration. Engines remained unchanged, and the four-speed automatic overdrive transmission was standard equipment. Other standard equipment for all models included tinted glass, a remote-control driver's side-view mirror, automatic headlight on/off, and an AM/FM stereo. A police version of the Caprice wagon was made; it had the code 1A2 and was designed for special service use.

1989 marked the first year of a fuel-injected V8 engine. The 305 cu in V8 was updated with throttle body electronic fuel-injection (RPO LO3), first introduced in 1987 on Chevrolet/GMC pickups and vans. This engine was rated at 170 hp (127 kW) and 255 lb⋅ft (346 N⋅m), which was only a slight increase in torque over the carbureted engine. However, as a result of fuel injection, the cold weather starts, drivability, fuel economy, and emissions were all improved. The 4.3 L V6 was no longer the base engine, and was now only available in taxi and police optioned Caprices. The 307 engine remained unchanged for station wagons. Rear-seat passengers received shoulder belts for the outboard positions and air conditioning was standard on all models.

Essentially, 1990 was a carryover year and marked the last year for this body style. New for 1990 were door-mounted front seat belts, quick-connect fuel lines for the 305 cu in engine, revised interior colors, new metallic paint color choices, and Scotchgard-protected interior fabrics. The model range and engine offerings were unchanged. The 1990 Caprice was produced until August 1990 when production at Lakewood Heights ended after 62 years; it saw some overlap with early 1991 models on dealers' forecourts.

Production Figures:

Chevrolet Caprice Production Figures
	Coupe	Sedan	Wagon	Yearly Total
1977	71,973	212,840	56,569	341,382
1978	60,072	203,837	57,744	321,653
1979	58,453	203,017	56,261	317,731
1980	22,776	91,208	23,304	137,288
1981	16,356	89,573	27,532	133,461
1982	11,999	86,126	25,385	123,510
1983	-	122,613	53,028	175,641
1984	19,541	135,970	65,688	221,199
1985	16,229	139,240	55,886	211,355
1986	9,869	139,209	45,183	194,261
1987	3,110	128,784	23,387	155,281
1988	-	97,563	30,645	128,208
1989	-	173,255	23,789	197,044
1990	-	211,552	12,305	223,857
Total	290,378	2,034,787	556,706	2,881,871

=== 9C1 Police model ===
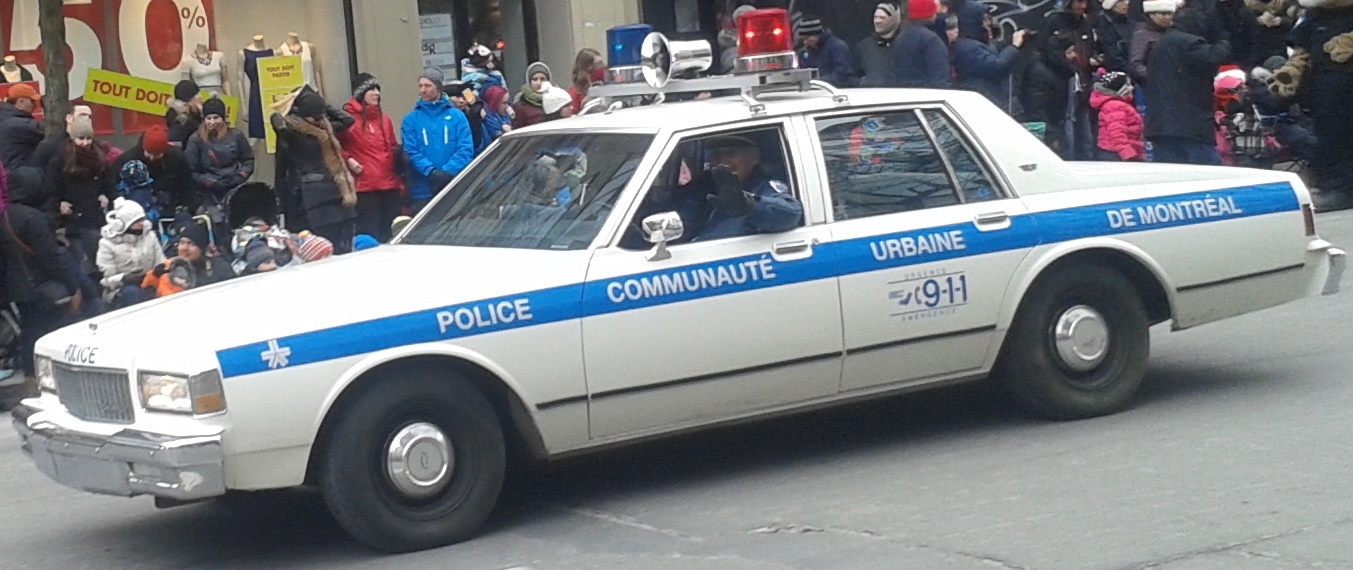
Chevrolet Caprice (9C1)

A police package, orderable under GM's Regular Production Option code 9C1, was introduced for the new base-model Caprice that replaced the Impala for 1986. In the 1986 Michigan State Police tests, the Chevrolet Caprice was competitive with the Ford LTD Crown Victoria, Dodge Diplomat and Plymouth Gran Fury. The Caprice had the fastest quarter-mile times of the three, and the best fuel economy. The Dodge and Plymouth outran the Caprice in the 0–100 mph times, but placed last in the road course times. However, there was only a 1/3 second difference between the fastest and slowest vehicles on the road course. All four cars were very close in competition for 1986, and there was little performance difference.

For 1987, the 9C1 Caprice changed little. The 350-4bbl engine received a boost in compression, roller lifters, and new center-bolt valve covers. The 180 hp (134 kW) rating of this engine helped boost the Caprice's performance above its competition. The 4.3 L LB4 V6 engine remained available, but was marketed towards urban police departments with less need for performance. Michigan State Police tests had the Chevrolet Caprice beating its competition from Ford, Dodge, and Plymouth in almost every category. The Caprice had the quickest quarter-mile times and 0–100 mph times, the highest top speed, the fastest road course time, and the best fuel economy, though the Plymouth and Dodge had shorter braking distances. The 1987 Chevrolet Caprice won the contract for the Michigan State police and would hold this contract until 1996 when the Caprice was discontinued.

For 1988, the 9C1 Caprice was again unchanged. Michigan State Police tests proved to be more competitive, with the Ford LTD Crown Victoria showing a strong improvement in performance. The Plymouth and Dodge models continued unchanged and were not competitive with the Chevrolet and Ford. 1988 tests showed the Caprice with the fastest quarter-mile and 0–100 mph times, the best fuel economy, the fastest road course time (although it tied with the Ford) and the best ergonomics. The Ford edged out the Chevrolet with a 1 mph (1.6 km/h) faster top speed and better brakes, but the Chevrolet scored second place for both those categories. Overall the Chevrolet scored the highest in the competition, followed by the Ford, Dodge, and Plymouth

For 1989, the 9C1 Caprice received some major changes to the drivetrain. All engines were now equipped with throttle-body fuel-injection (shared with the truck/van lineup and based on the LB4 4.3L TBI injection system first used with the 1985 model year passenger cars), and the 305 cu in (5.00 L) engine (RPO LO3) was now added to the options list. The available engines were now the 4.3 L (260 cu in) V6, the 305 cu in (5.00 L) and 350 cu in (5.7 L) V8s (which was only available on police package models). The V6 and 350 engines were equipped with TH700-R4 transmissions while the 305 engine used the TH200-4R transmission. The V6 and the 305 used a 3.08:1 axle ratio, while the 350-powered cars now used a 3.42:1 axle ratio. The 4.3 L remained at 140 hp (104 kW), while the 305 TBI engine was rated at 170 hp (127 kW), and the 350 TBI engine was rated at 190 hp (142 kW). Unlike the LO5 used with the GMT400 light-duty truck and van line including the R/V series, the police spec LO5 used the roller camshaft sourced from its TPI equipped F bodies and Corvette along with high flow fuel injectors. The 350 powered Caprice did well again at Michigan State Police tests for pursuit-rated cars. It had the fastest 0–100 mph, the fastest road course time, the highest top speed and the best fuel economy. The Dodge Diplomat and Ford LTD Crown Victoria outbraked the Caprice, and the Plymouth Fury and Dodge Diplomat had better ergonomics than the Caprice.

1990 was another carry-over year for the 9C1 Caprice with the only major change being door-mounted seatbelts. In Michigan State Police tests, the only competition was from the Ford LTD Crown Victoria, as the production of the Dodge Diplomat and Plymouth Gran Fury had ended during 1989. The Caprice won all six categories for 1990, having the quickest 0–100 times, the fastest road course times, the best brakes, highest top speed, the best fuel economy, and the best interior ergonomics. This was the first time any car had won all six categories in Michigan State Police tests.

== Fourth generation (1991–1996) ==
Fourth generation
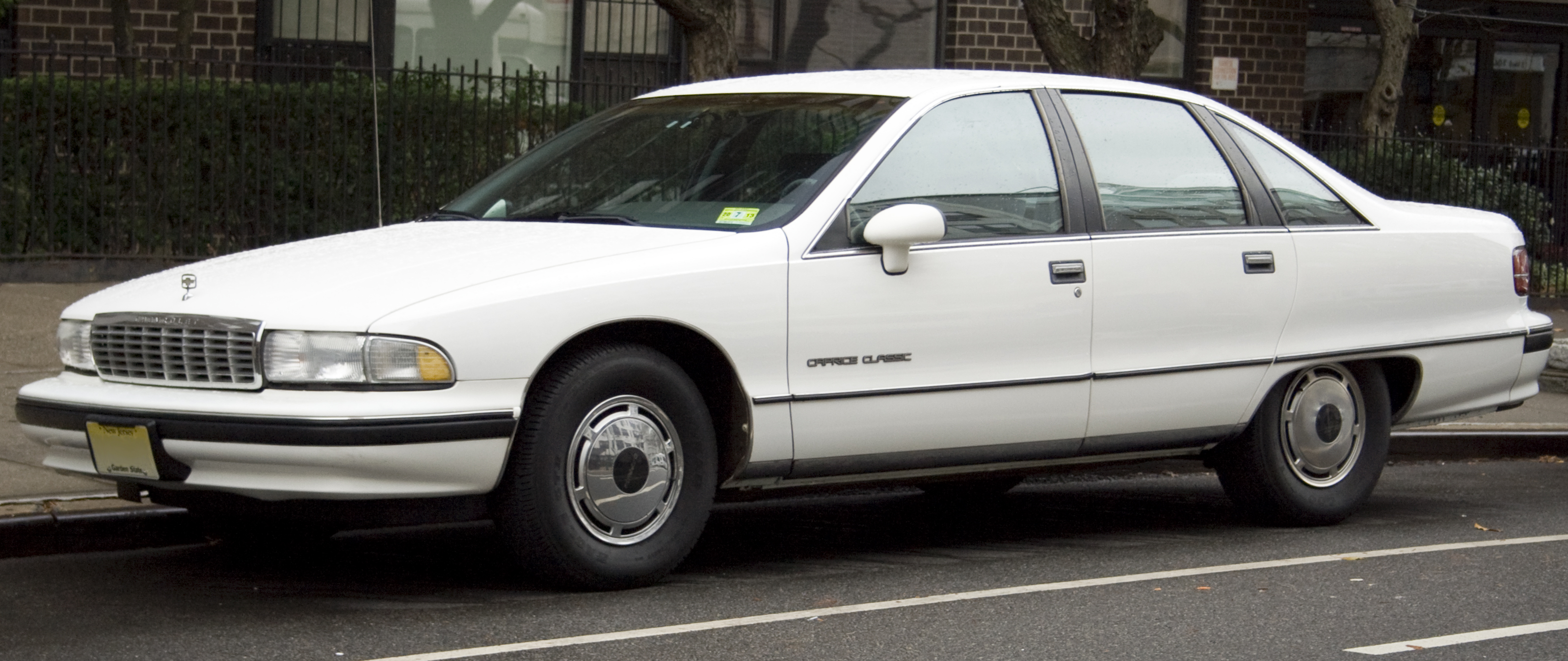
- 1991 Chevrolet Caprice sedan

Overview
- Production: April 12, 1990 – December 13, 1996
- Model years: 1991–1996
- Assembly: Willow Run Assembly, Ypsilanti, Michigan, U.S. (1990–93); Arlington Assembly, Arlington, Texas, U.S. (1990–96)
- Designer: Ben Salvador (1987)

Body and chassis
- Body style: 4-door sedan; 4-door station wagon
- Related: Buick Roadmaster; Buick Roadmaster Estate; Cadillac Fleetwood; Chevrolet Impala SS; Oldsmobile Custom Cruiser

Powertrain
- Engine: 4.3 L LB4 V6; 4.3 L L99 V8; 5.0 L L03 V8; 5.7 L L05/LT1 V8
- Transmission: 4-speed 4L60 automatic (1991–93); 4-speed 4L60-E automatic (1994–96)

Dimensions
- Wheelbase: 115.9 in (2,944 mm)
- Length: 214.1 in (5,438 mm) (sedan); 217.3 in (5,519 mm) (wagon)
- Width: 77 in (1,956 mm) (1991–93 sedan); 77.5 in (1,968 mm) (1994–96 sedan); 79.6 in (2,022 mm) (wagon)
- Height: 55.7 in (1,415 mm) (sedan); 60.8 in (1,544 mm) (1991–93 wagon); 60.9 in (1,547 mm) (1994–96 wagon)
- Curb weight: 4,473 lb (2,029 kg)

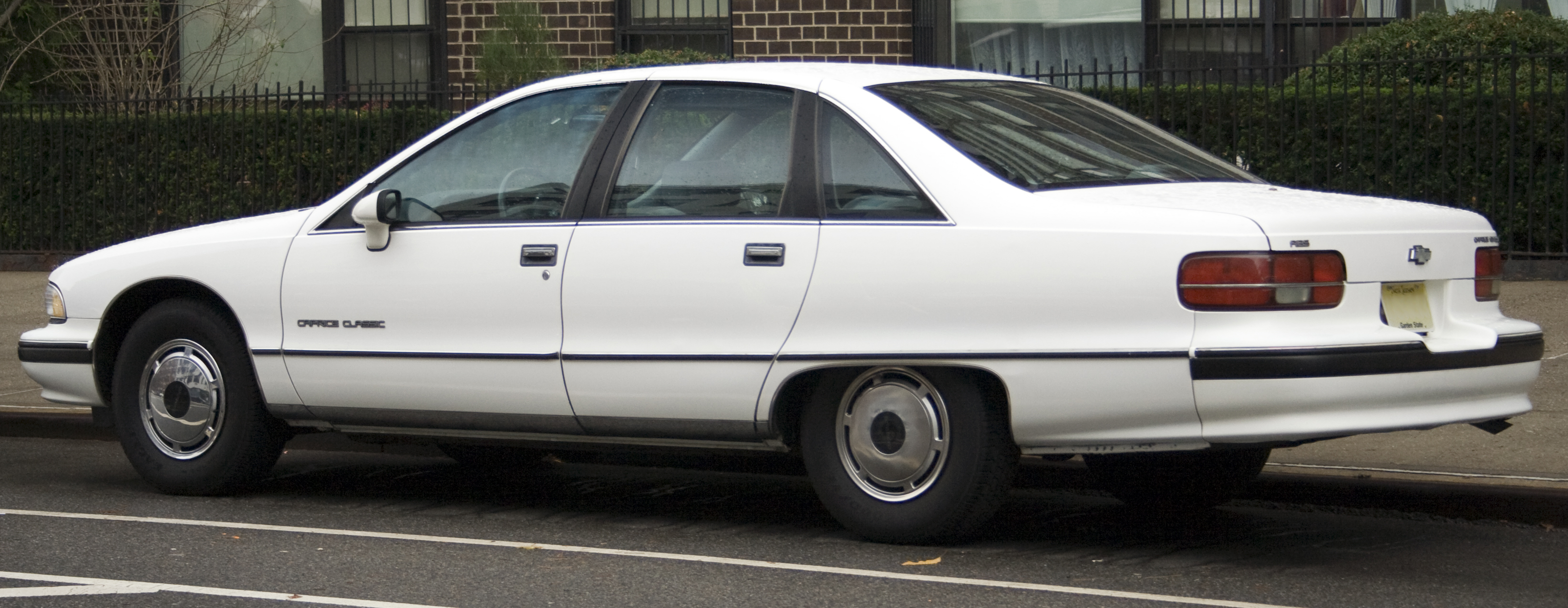
Pre-facelift 1991 Caprice sedan

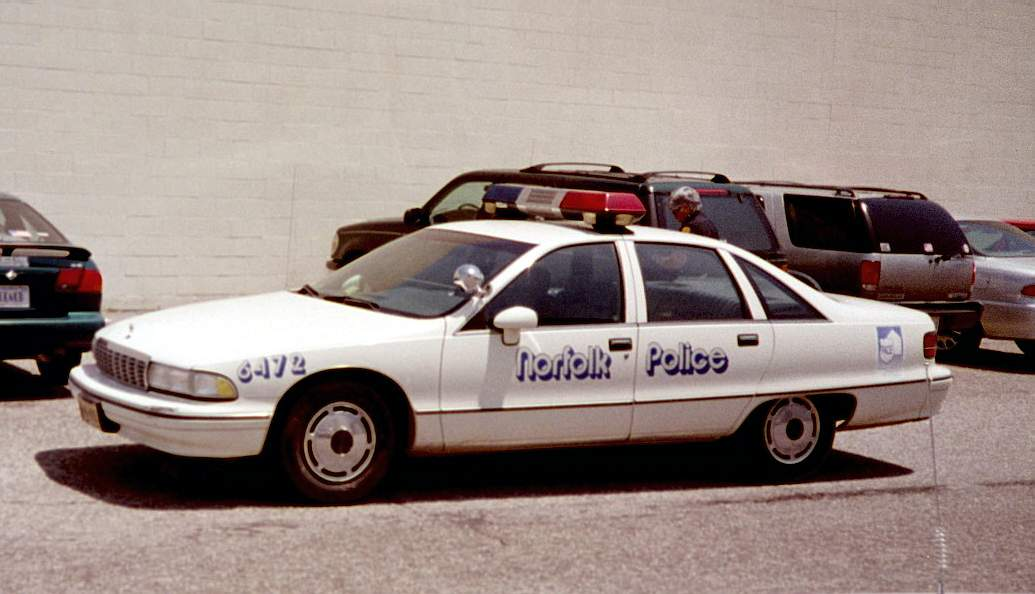
1992 Chevrolet Caprice (9C1) police package

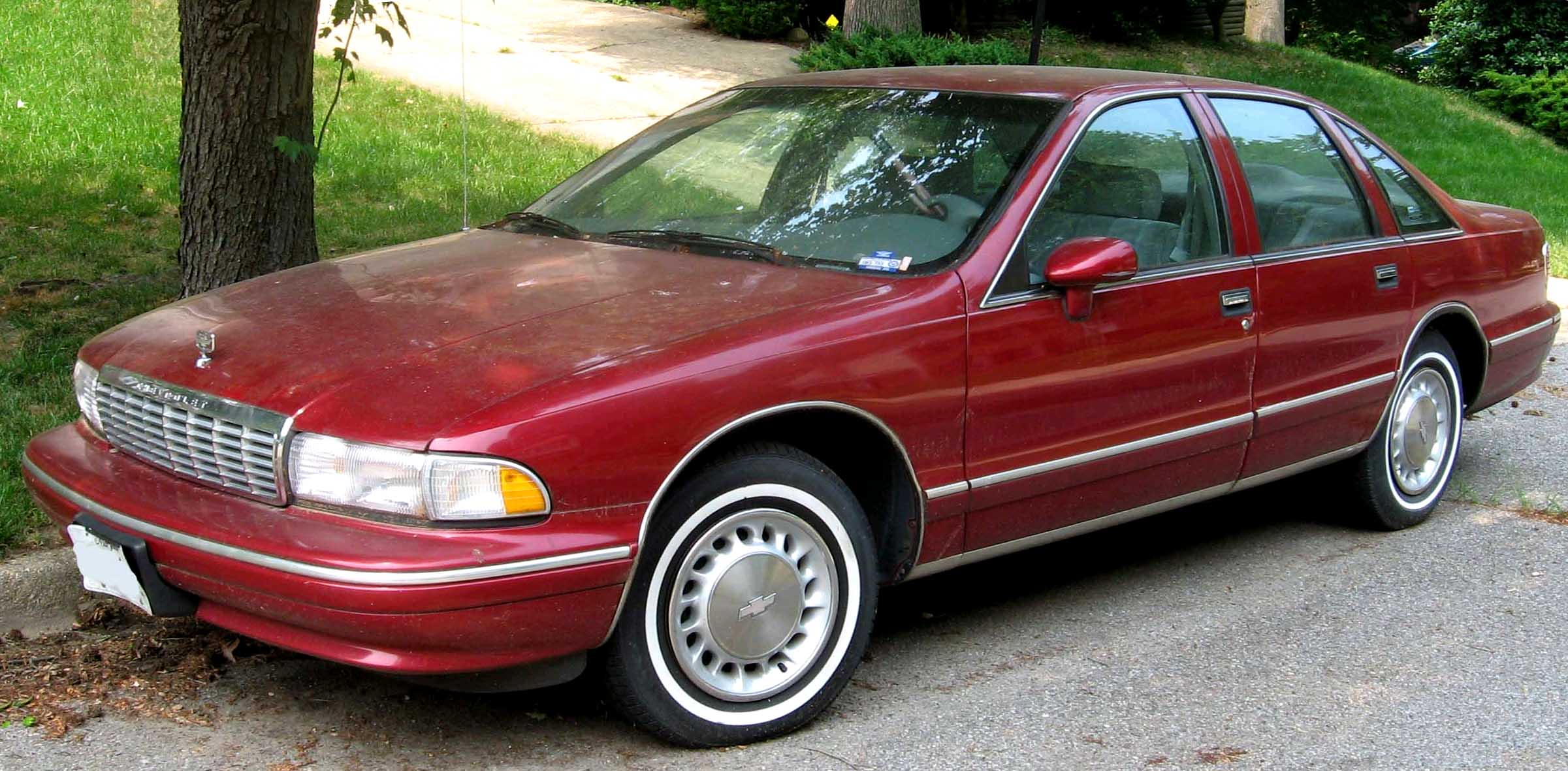
1993 facelift Caprice sedan

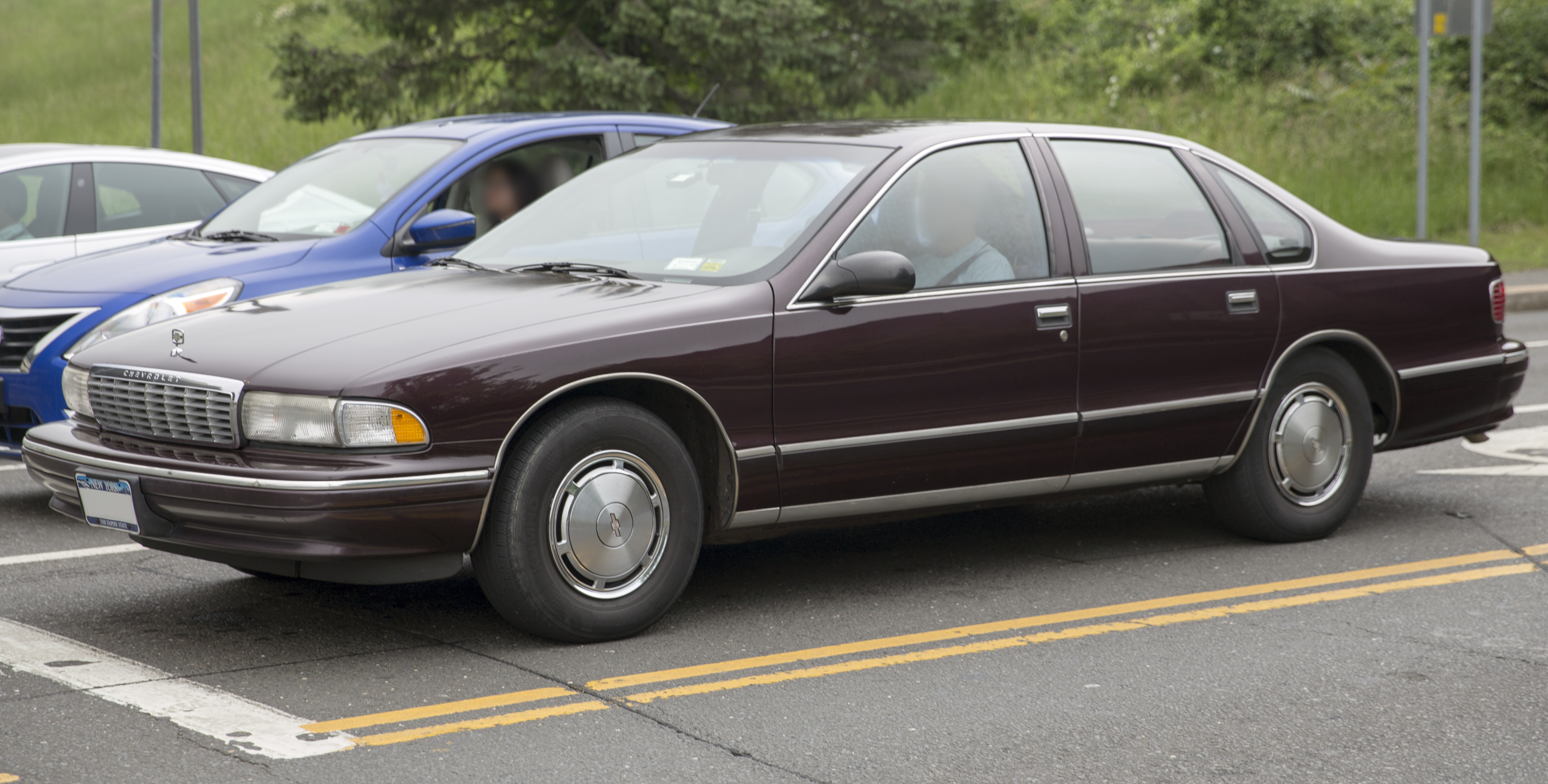
1995 facelift Caprice sedan

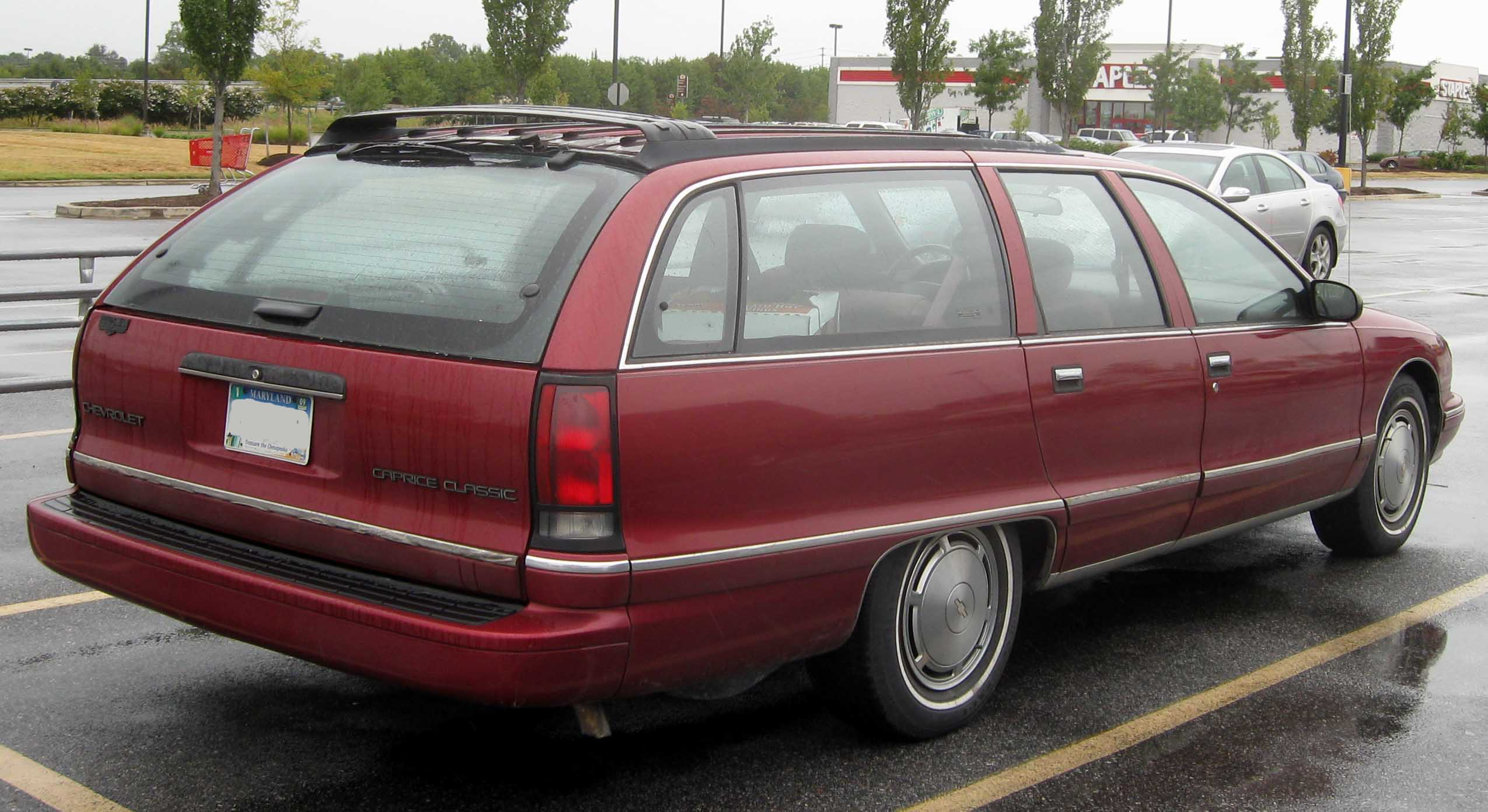
1995–96 Caprice station wagon

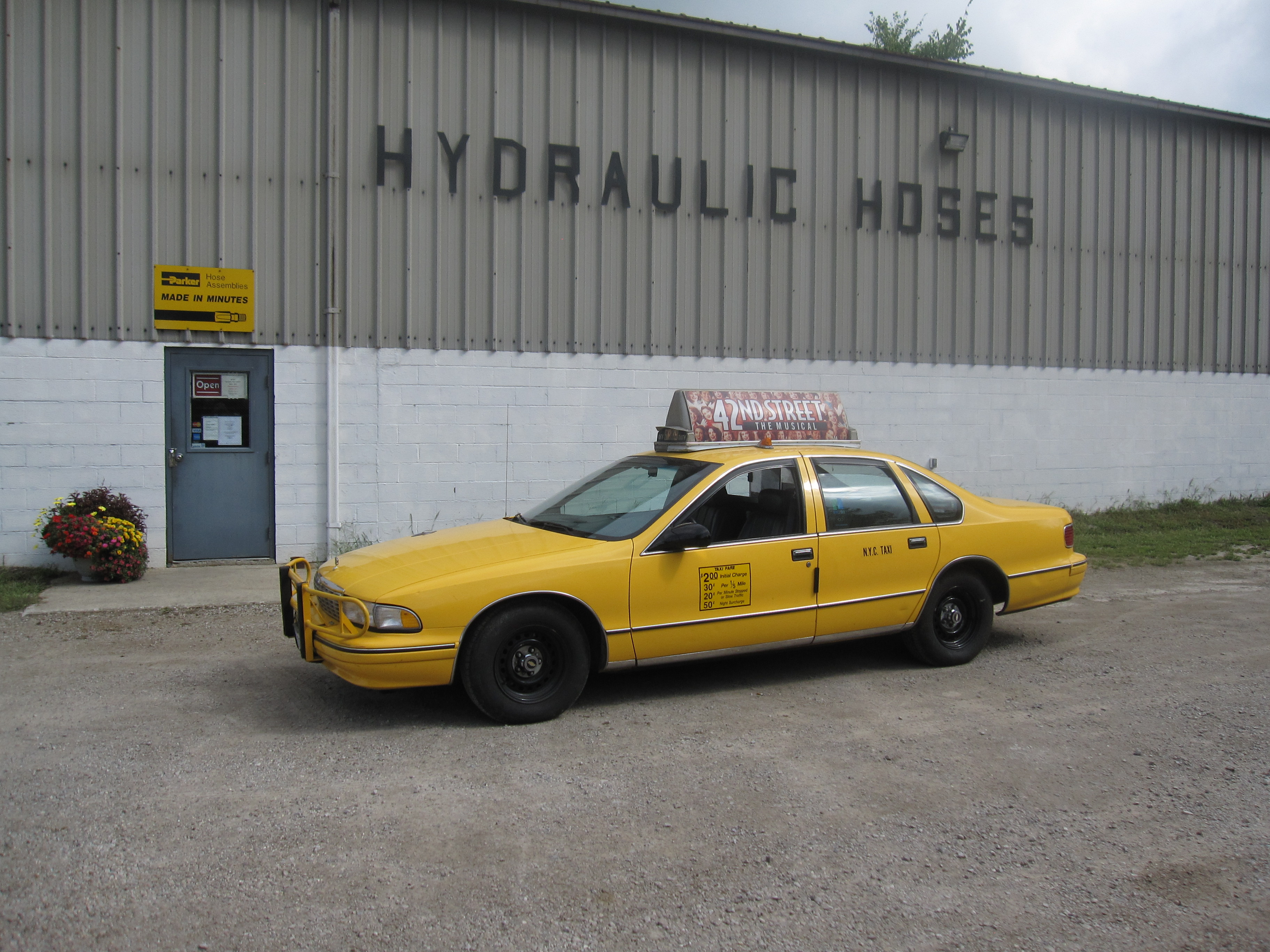
1996 Chevrolet Caprice (9C6) taxi cab from New York City

Introduced in April 1990 for the 1991 model year in America, the Caprice was restyled, replacing the previously rectilinear styling with rounded, more aerodynamic sheetmetal. The Caprice Classic received Motor Trend's 1991 Domestic Car of the Year.

General Motors initially decided in 1980 to eliminate the production of the former generation model by 1989 for the 1990 model year, but a business decision in 1985 to plan an exterior redesign gave a further continuation and this generation's fiberglass prototype model was first shown in April 1987.

While the body and interior were new, the chassis, powertrain, and transmission were largely carried over from the former generation 1977 and 1990 models respectively; the steel fuel tank was replaced by an HDPE tank (with capacity on sedans decreasing from 25 US gallons (95 L) to 23 US gallons (87 L)), and anti-lock brakes were added as standard equipment on all models. Several major components (including the floor pan) are entirely interchangeable between 1977 and 1996, merely having a reskinned body on an already dated body-on-frame platform introduced in 1977.

Much of the engine availability was carried over from the previous generation, which included for all models the 5.0 L L03 V8. The 5.7-liter L05 V8 was also carried over; it was originally only available on 1991 and 1992 9C1 Police package models (which featured a digital speedometer), but finally made available to the general public on the 1993 Caprice LTZ, and the LB4 4.3 L V6 was carried over to the 1992–93 Caprice 9C6 taxi package for increased fuel economy at significantly reduced power output.

Two trim levels were initially offered, Caprice and Caprice Classic, replacing the previous Classic and Brougham models.

The final B-body Caprice was not well received by critics and did not hold on to high annual sales numbers, with roughly half from fleet sales. The car's styling was criticized as a "beached whale" and "an upside-down bathtub", then later as the "bubble Caprice" in response to the former generation's nickname "box Caprice".

1993 revisions removed the rear fender skirts in favor of more open wheel wells on the sedan model; station wagons retained the skirted wheel wells. With 1991–93 Caprices essentially having the same three engine options and 4L60 transmission from the former generation, in the fall of 1993 for the 1994 model year, the Caprice received two new V8 engine replacements that shared the exact same external dimensions yet differ internally, and a new transmission. The standard engine in all sedans, including many 9C1 police sedans, was the 200 hp (149 kW), L99 263 cu. in. (4.3 L) V8 for better fuel economy in response to rising fuel prices after the Persian Gulf War that was rated at 240 lb·ft (325 N·m) of torque on 87 octane. Caprice sedans were the only cars to receive the L99 4.3 L V8 engine. The Caprice was one of the first cars to introduce OBD 1.5 as standard prior to OBD II being mandatory on all sedans for the 1996 model year.

For the 1994 model year, Chevrolet offered an optional detuned (by 40 hp) version of the fourth generation Corvette's LT1 350 cu. in. (5.7 L) performance V8 engine rated at 260 hp (194 kW) and 330 lb⋅ft (447 N⋅m) of torque. The LT1 was optional in the 9C1 police packages, oriented to highway and rural use, and standard on all wagons, with General Motors offering roughly 846 optional 1A2 Caprice special service police package wagons between 1991 and 1995, which were generally available for other administrative duties such as; supervisors, detectives, unmarked units, and fire departments. The LT1 350 cu. in. was standard in civilian sedans with the addition of the V92 towing package. The V92 towing package also gave a heavy-duty suspension with similar spring rates to the 9C1 police car suspension, 2.93 gears, V08 heavy-duty cooling with a mechanical fan, heavy-duty rear drum brakes, and limited-slip differential. The 4L60-E transmission replaced the 4L60. Transmission failures shortly after 100,000 miles (160,000 km), especially when paired with the stronger LT1 V8, were commonplace due to transmission build and software specs that sacrificed long-term durability for slightly improved fuel economy scores. The 1994 Caprice's interior had a redesign which featured a Camaro steering wheel, digital speedometer and odometer, and a new instrument panel, which included a front passengers-side airbag.

For the 1995 model year, the rear side window between the back door and C pillar, featured a so-called Hofmeister kink and both the sedan and wagon had their now foldable exterior mirrors repositioned. In 1995 and 1996 the Impala SS was exported to Middle Eastern markets badged as the Caprice SS, with the car being identical to its American counterpart except for the side fonts on the rear quarter panel and the badge on the dashboard saying Caprice SS.

The Caprice 9C1 with the LT1 engine became one of the quickest and most popular modern-day police vehicles. This vehicle established such strong devotion by many police departments that a cottage industry thrived in refurbishing Caprices for continued police service after GM discontinued production of the car, with many police departments keeping them in service longer than other police cars from that era. The 1994-96 Caprice 9C1 5.7 L V8 and Impala SS are mechanically the same, as both shared four wheel disc brakes and rigid heavy duty suspension components. In 2006, Chrysler introduced the Dodge Charger Pursuit, serving as an indirect successor to the Caprice's muscle sedan heritage after a decade long absence.

The car's production was stopped in December 1996 due to sales pressure from the mid-size Chevrolet Lumina, financial troubles at General Motors, and consumer demand shifting from full-sized family sedans to the increasingly popular sport utility vehicles. The Arlington, Texas vehicle assembly plant (used for the Caprice, Impala SS, Buick Roadmaster, Oldsmobile Custom Cruiser, and Cadillac Fleetwood) was converted to produce GM's more profitable full size SUVs (the Tahoe and Suburban). In 1997, the Lumina LTZ would take the Caprice's place as Chevrolet's premium passenger car. Total production of 1991–96 models was 689,257 with production ending on December 13, 1996. There were plans to reintroduce the Caprice for the 2000 model year in America, but was only revived in the Middle East as the Holden Caprice. The Chevrolet Impala nameplate was reintroduced to the American passenger car market in 2000 as the marque's premium offering, albeit in a front wheel drive configuration.

Available engines
Years	Engine	Power (at rpm)	Torque (at rpm)	Fuel	Exhaust	Notes
1991–1993	5.0 L/305 cu in L03 Small-Block V8	170 hp (127 kW)	255 lb⋅ft (346 N⋅m)	TBI	single	std, sedan
1991	5.7 L/350 cu in L05 Small-Block V8	195 hp (145 kW)	295 lb⋅ft (400 N⋅m)	TBI	single	police
1992–1993	4.3 L/262 cu in LB4 V6	145 hp (108 kW)/4000	220 lb⋅ft (298 N⋅m)/2800	TBI	single	taxi (9C6)
1992–1993	5.7 L/350 cu in L05 Small-Block V8	180 hp (134 kW)	300 lb⋅ft (407 N⋅m)	TBI	single	LTZ/wagon
1992–1993	5.7 L/350 cu in L05 Small-Block V8	205 hp (153 kW)	300 lb⋅ft (407 N⋅m)	TBI	single	police
1994–1996	4.3 L/263 cu in L99 Small-Block V8	200 hp (149 kW)/5200	240 lb⋅ft (325 N⋅m)/2400	MPFI	single	std, sedan
1994–1996	5.7 L/350 cu in LT1 Small-Block V8	260 hp (194 kW)	330 lb⋅ft (447 N⋅m)	MPFI	dual	std, wagon, police

Production Figures:

Chevrolet Caprice Production Figures
	Sedan	Wagon	Yearly Total
1991	89,297	15,000	104,297
1992	103,381	13,400	116,781
1993	90,041	10,607	100,648
1994	90,026	7,719	97,745
1995	54,273	5,030	59,303
1996	27,155	485	27,640
Total	454,173	52,241	506,414

== Fifth generation (1999–2006) ==
Fifth generation
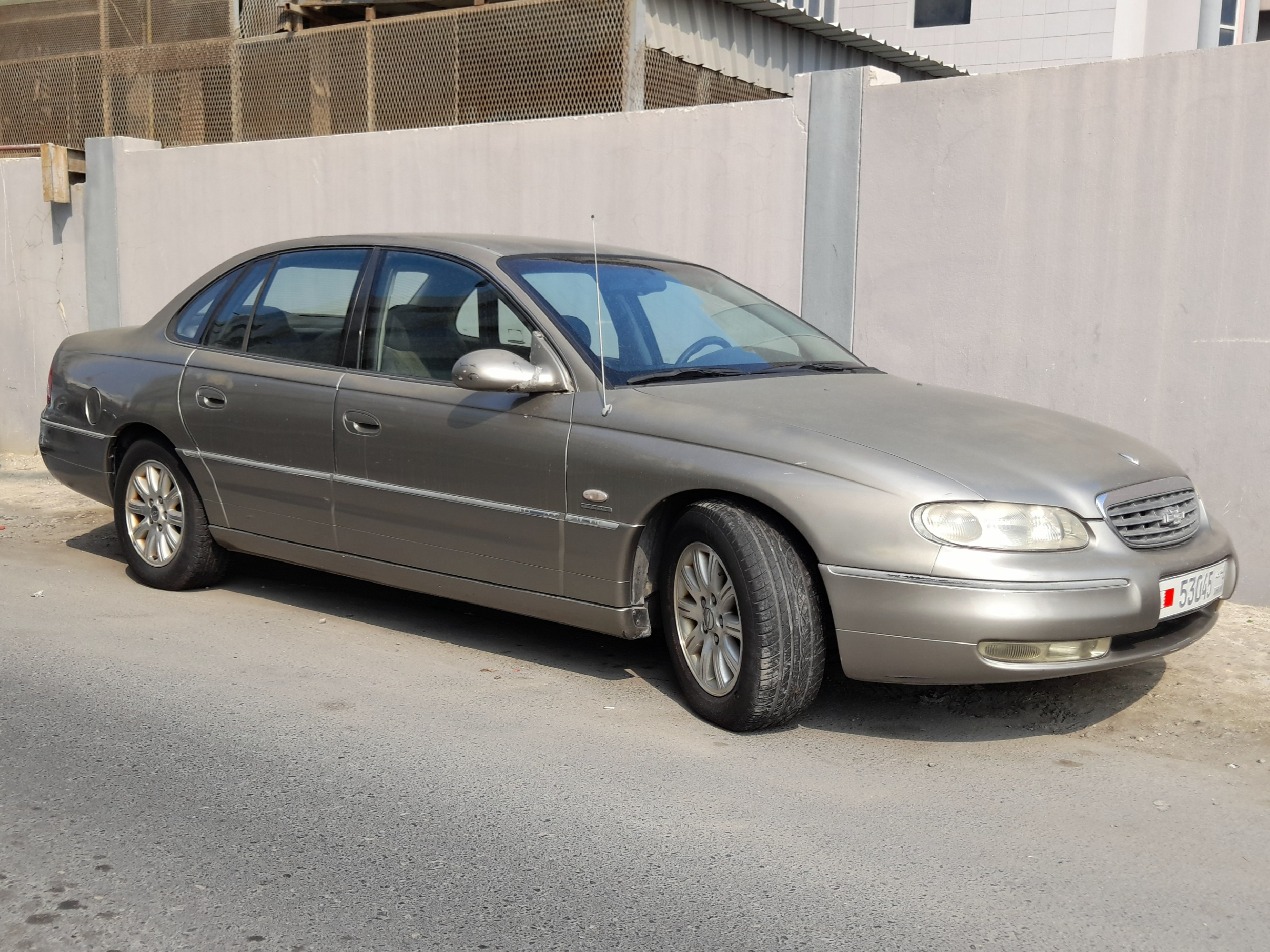
- 1999–2003 Chevrolet Caprice LTZ [WH] (Bahrain)

Overview
- Manufacturer: Holden (General Motors)
- Also called: Buick Royaum (China); Holden Caprice/Statesman; Daewoo Statesman (South Korea)
- Production: 1999–2006
- Model years: 2000–2006 (Middle East)
- Assembly: Australia: Adelaide, South Australia (Elizabeth)
- Designer: Mike Simcoe

Body and chassis
- Class: Luxury car
- Body style: 4-door sedan
- Layout: Front-engine, rear-wheel-drive
- Platform: V-body
- Related: Holden Commodore VT/VX/VY/VZ; Holden Caprice/Statesman; Opel Omega; Chevrolet Lumina

Powertrain
- Engine: 3.8 L L36 V6; 5.7 L LS1 V8
- Transmission: 4-speed 4L60-E automatic

Dimensions
- Wheelbase: 2,944 mm (115.9 in)
- Length: 5,194 mm (204.5 in)
- Width: 1,849 mm (72.8 in)
- Height: 1,460 mm (57.5 in)
- Curb weight: 1,798–1,998 kg (3,964–4,405 lb)

General Motors revived the Chevrolet Caprice nameplate in the Middle East and Latin/South American markets on imported Holden Statesman and Caprice models built by its Australian subsidiary Holden, these cars were lengthened versions of the Commodore range, which was at this time based on the Opel Omega. The WH series Statesman/Caprice was the first series to be engineered to support both left- and right-hand drive (Middle Eastern market being LHD while Australia right-hand drive) in order to allow for manufacturing of export versions. Same was true for the related short-wheelbase Holden VT Commodore, whose left-hand drive version became the Chevrolet Lumina in the Middle East.

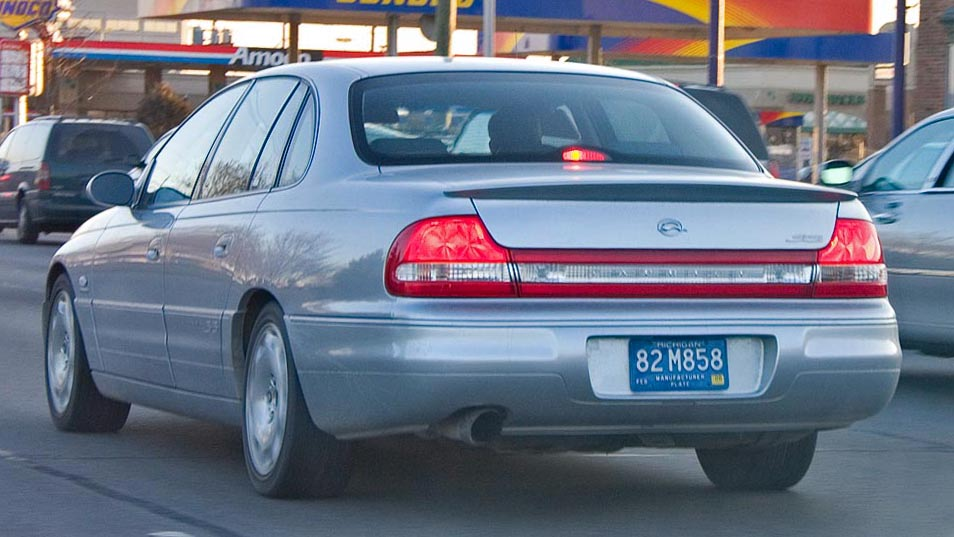
1999–2003 Chevrolet Caprice SS [WH] (rear view)

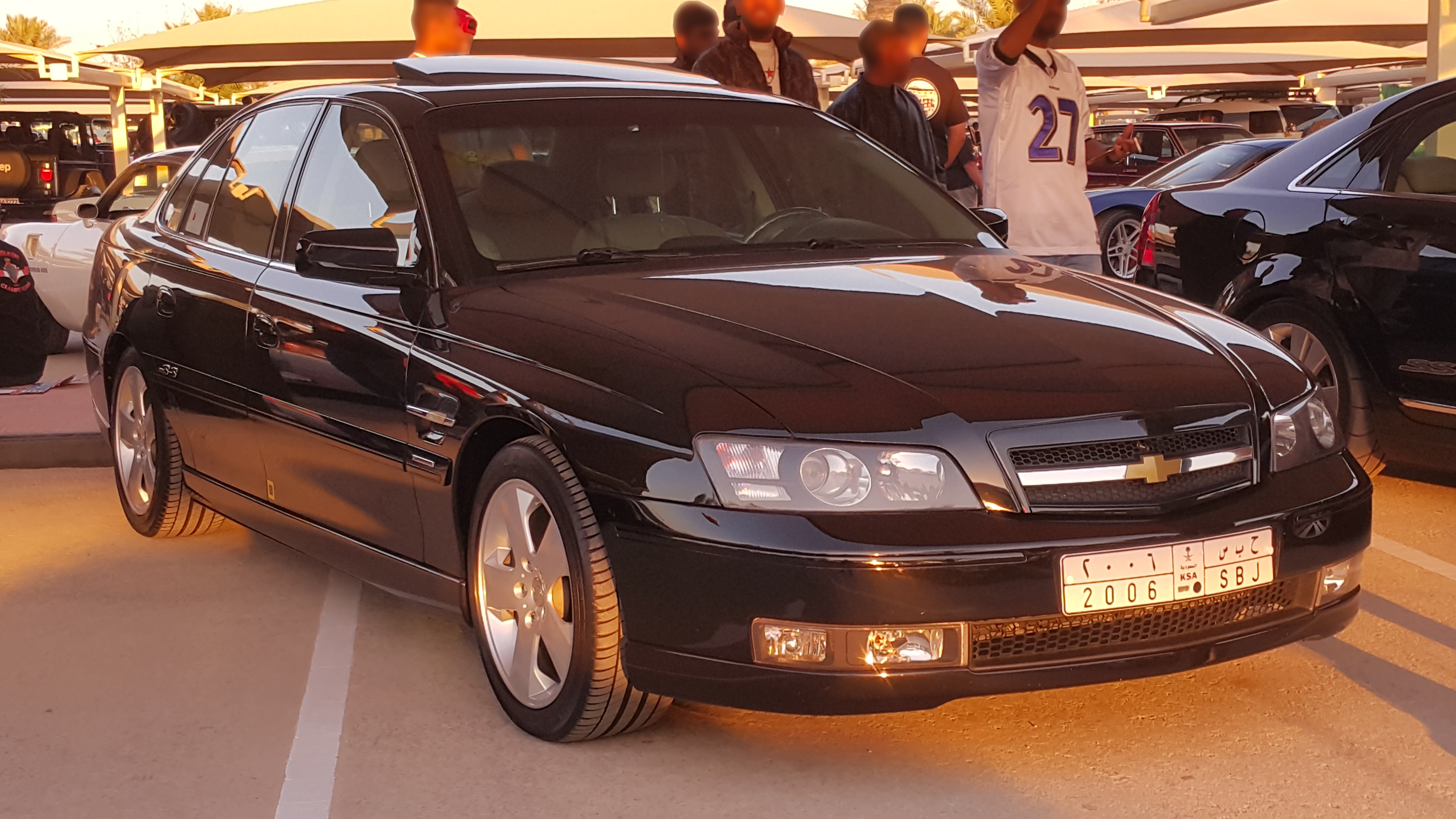
2005–2006 Chevrolet Caprice SS [WL]

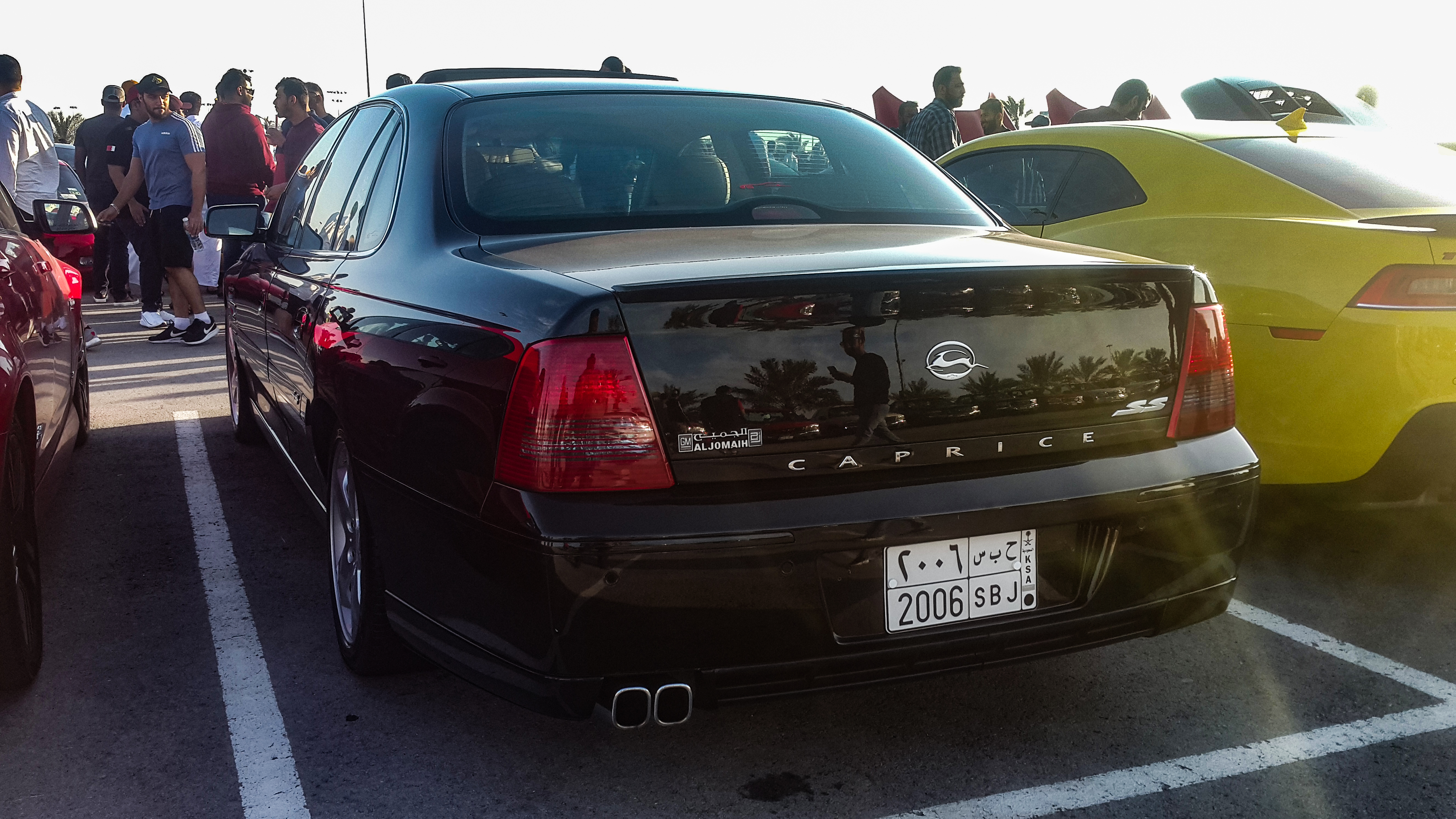
2005–2006 Chevrolet Caprice SS [WL] (rear view)

The Middle Eastern Caprice came out for 2000 in four versions, base LS, standard mid-range LTZ, a sporty SS and the range topper Royale (introduced in 2002). Differences between the models were mostly equipment and slight styling tweaks. The base LS came with a 3.8 L V6 engine; the LTZ came standard with a 220 kW (295 hp) 5.7 L Gen III V8, the SS and Royale came with a 242 kW (325 hp) version of the same engine. In 2003, Holden launched a revised and facelifted Statesman and Caprice (WK), which was reflected in their Middle Eastern versions for the 2004 model year. The new models sported new front and rear fascias and completely redesigned interior. Engines carried over unchanged.

In 1999, GM had again considered resurrecting the Caprice name in America for 2000, this time under this generation, and as a new Caprice 9C1 long before the appearance of the sixth-generation model (third-generation Holden Caprice) as the Caprice PPV, but it did return several years later as such.

Engine	Model Years	Transmission	Power (hp / kW)	Torque (Nm / lbft)	0–100 km/h (0–62 mph)	Top speed	Engine code	Notes
Ecotec V6 3.8L (L36 Series II)	2000–2003	4-speed automatic	210hp / 157kW	310N.m / 229lb.ft	9.5 s	210 km/h (130 mph)	L36	Pre-facelift version of the 3.8L Ecotec V6, throttle cable, older ignition system.
Ecotec V6 3.8L (L36 Series III)	2004–2006	4-speed automatic	230hp / 171kW	320N.m / 236lb.ft	9.3 s	220 km/h (137 mph)	L36	Facelift version, electronic throttle, updated coils; minor power increase.
5.7L Gen III LS1 V8	2000–2003	4-speed automatic	330hp / 246kW	475N.m / 350lb.ft	7.3 s	240 km/h (149 mph)	LS1	Early LS1 version used in pre-2003 Caprice.
5.7L Gen III LS1 V8 (updated)	2004–2006	4-speed automatic	340hp / 251kW	480N.m / 354lb.ft	7.1 s	240 km/h (149 mph)	LS1	Updated LS1 with higher output and improved PCM tuning.

== Sixth generation (2006–2017) ==
Sixth generation
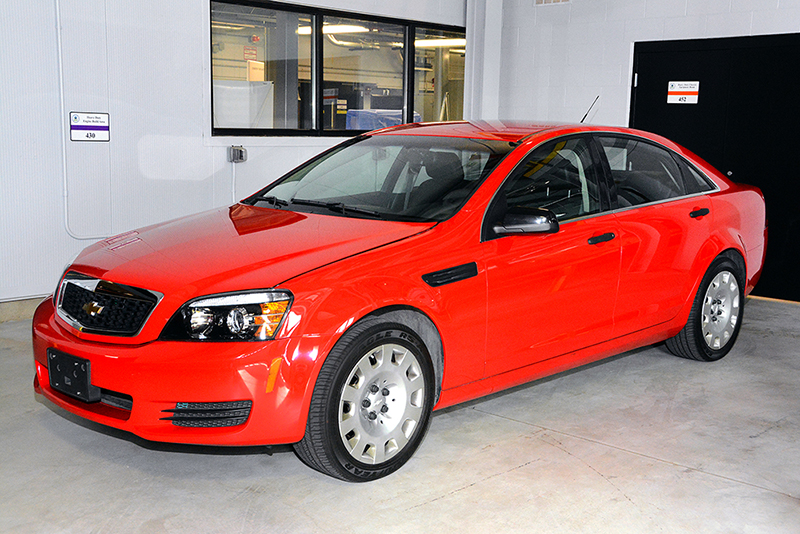

Overview
- Manufacturer: Holden (General Motors)
- Also called: Buick Park Avenue (China); Holden WM/WN Caprice; GM Daewoo Veritas (South Korea)
- Production: 2006–2017
- Model years: 2007–2016 (Middle East); 2011–2017 (North America)
- Assembly: Australia: Adelaide, South Australia (Elizabeth)
- Designer: Mike Simcoe

Body and chassis
- Class: Large car
- Body style: 4-door sedan
- Layout: Front-engine, rear-wheel-drive
- Platform: GM Zeta platform
- Related: Chevrolet Camaro; Chevrolet Lumina; Chevrolet SS; Holden Commodore (VE); Holden Commodore (VF); Holden Ute; Pontiac G8; Vauxhall VXR8

Powertrain
- Engine: 3.6 L LY7 V6 (179 kW (240 hp)); 3.6 L LFX V6 (224 kW (301 hp)); 6.0 L L77 V8 (265 kW (355 hp)); 6.0 L L98 V8 (268 kW (360 hp))
- Transmission: 4-speed 4L60-E automatic; 6-speed 6L80 automatic

Dimensions
- Wheelbase: 3,010 mm (118.5 in)
- Length: 5,187 mm (204.2 in)
- Width: 1,900 mm (74.8 in)
- Height: 1,491 mm (58.7 in)
- Curb weight: 1,802–1,890 kg (3,973–4,167 lb)

Chronology
- Predecessor: Pontiac G8

=== Middle East ===
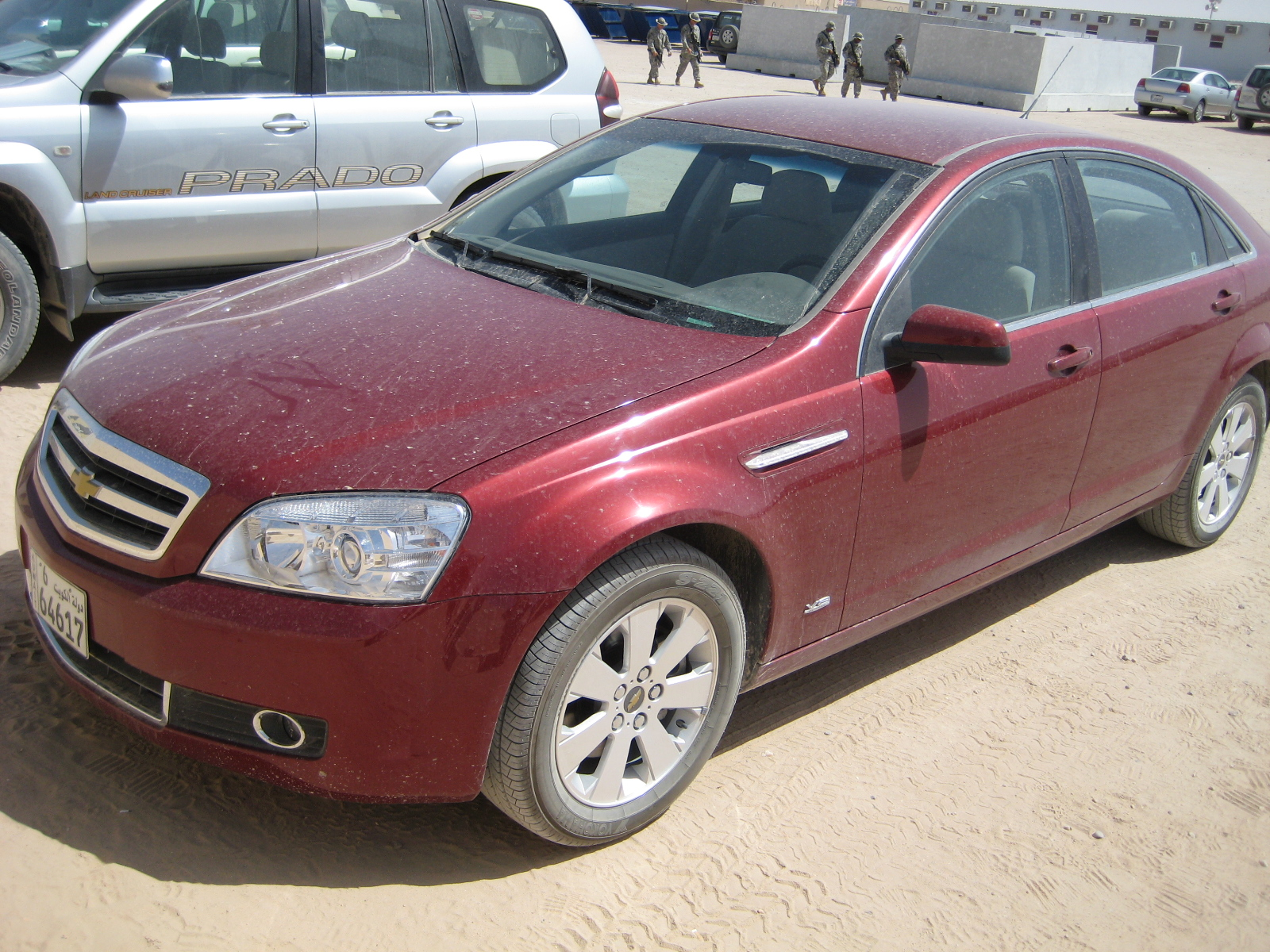
2008 Chevrolet Caprice LTZ (Middle East)

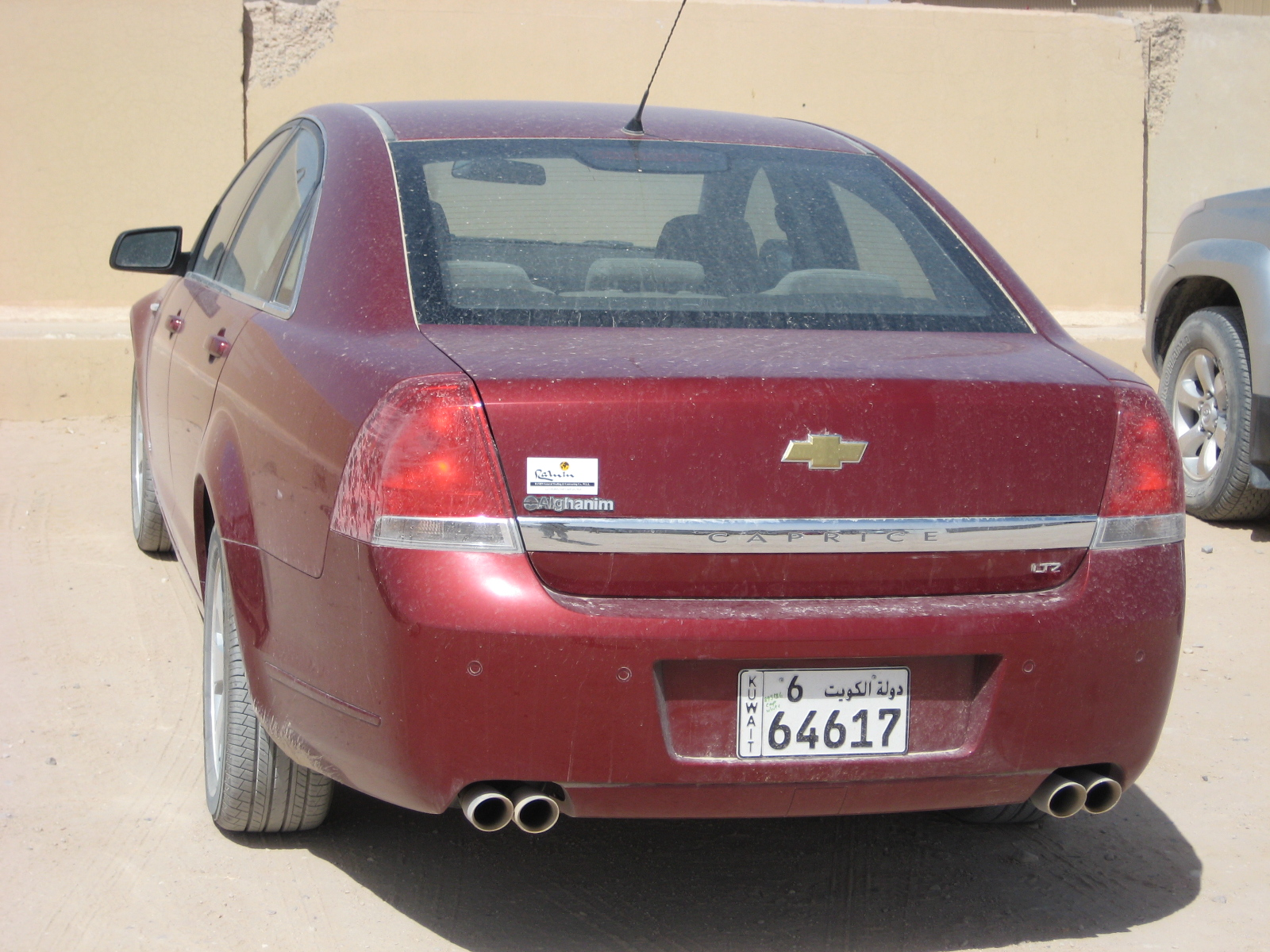
(rear view)

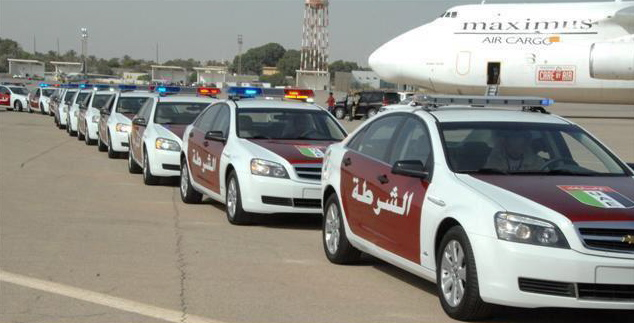
Chevrolet Caprice arriving at the Tripoli airport

In 2006, a Holden WM Caprice-based Chevrolet Caprice was launched, the Caprice was offered in four different trims: the LS, LTZ (Statesman), SS and Royale (Caprice), the LS and SS trims have no Australian equivalent.

The 3.6 L LY7 V6 was optional for the LS and LTZ trims. With the 6.0 L L98 V8 was available for the whole range. In 2011 the V6 engine was dropped.

The LS, LTZ, and Royale all share the front bumper as the Statesman while the LS lacks the Statesman foglights which are seen on the LTZ and Royale; the SS gains the WM Caprice's front bumper and foglamps minus the parking sensors. The LS also gains the VE Commodore Omega's interior and trims, while the LTZ gains the trims from the VE Commodore V based on the Commodore Omega, and the Statesman's interior minus the headrests with the LCD screens and DVD player, while the Royale gains the Statesman's trims, and the Statesman's interior with the LCD screens in the headrests and DVD player from the Holden versions, the grille from the Daewoo Veritas, hood ornament similar to the one that the appears on the 4th and 5th generation models, and the SS gains the same trims as the WM Caprice, interior from the WM Caprice minus the headrests with the LCD screens and DVD player, color-coded version of the grille's trim, and the optional lip spoiler from the WM Caprice.

The Chevrolet Caprice was updated for 2011 to include the features from the Holden WM II Caprice. The Caprice lettering engraved on the chrome trim was dropped and replaced by a Caprice nameplate badge which is below the chrome trim on the left end of the rear fascia on the trunk. The V6 engines were dropped in the LS & LTZ leaving the V8 as the standard engine while the LS got the trims that were previously on the LTZ, while the LTZ & Royale get the trims seen on the VE Commodore Calais V Series II, the SS now gains the trims that the WM Caprice V Series II has. The LS, LTZ, & Royale still retain the Statesman front bumper, while the SS still retains the Caprice/Caprice V front bumper. The Royale also gains a rear vision camera in the chrome trim on the trunk which is absent on the LS, LTZ, & SS like the Holden Caprice & Caprice V. The standard engine was a 3.6 L LY7 V6 for the LS and LTZ trims, while the 6.0 L L98 V8 was available across all trims. For the 2013 model year for the SS the Impala badge on the trunk was dropped in favor of the traditional Chevrolet bowtie.

The Caprice was updated again based on the Holden WN Caprice. The Caprice LS & LTZ still retain the front bumper as the WM Statesman while the Royale has the same front bumper as seen on the WM/WN Caprice and the SS and the trims that were previously on the 2011–2013 SS, and the VF Calais's interior. The SS now gains the rear vision camera which was previously only available on the Caprice Royale, the same interior updates the WN Caprice and Caprice Royale, and also delivered the same trims as on the WN Caprice V & while the LS, LTZ, and SS gain new trims.

=== North America ===
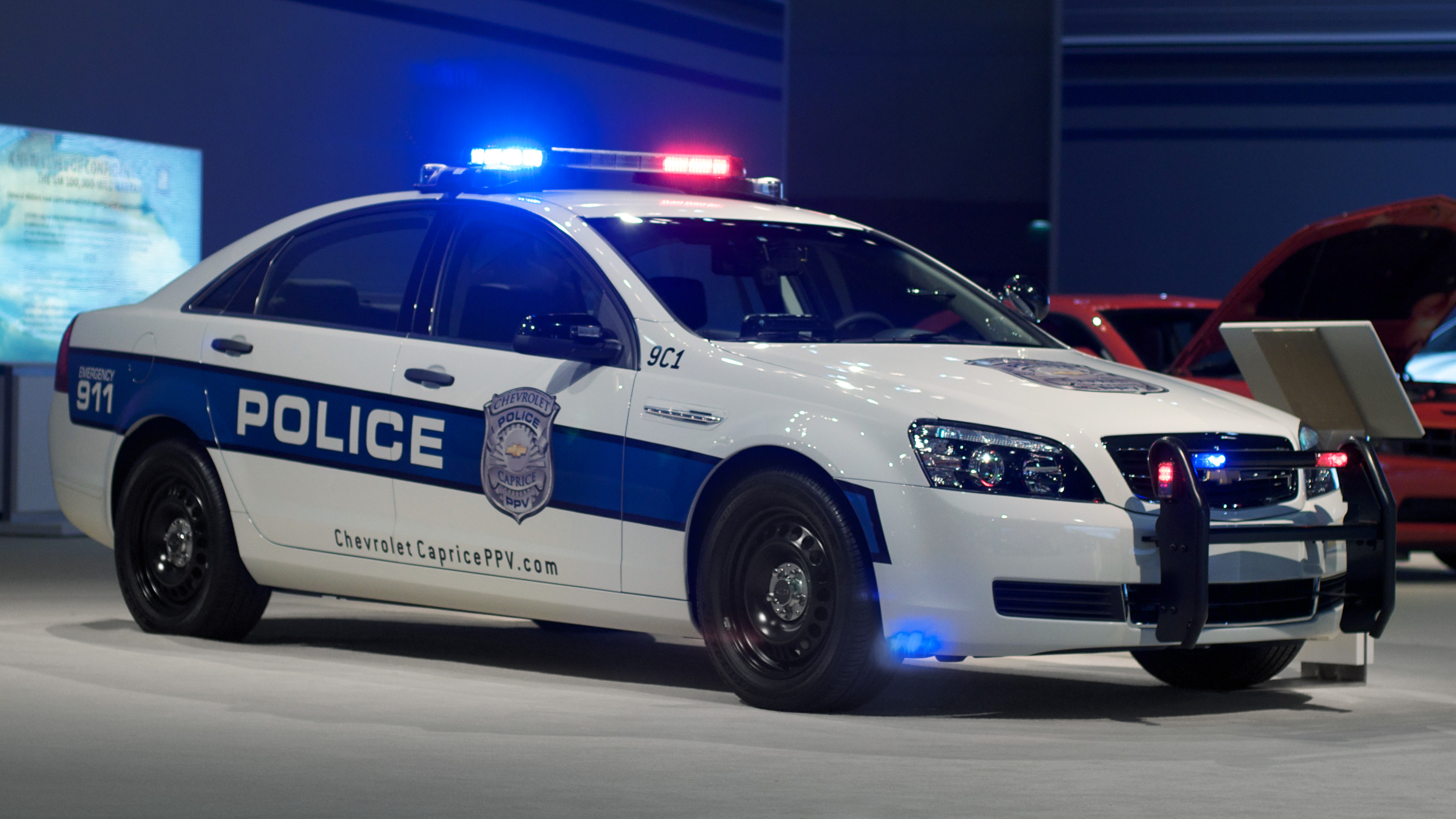
Chevrolet Caprice PPV (Concept)

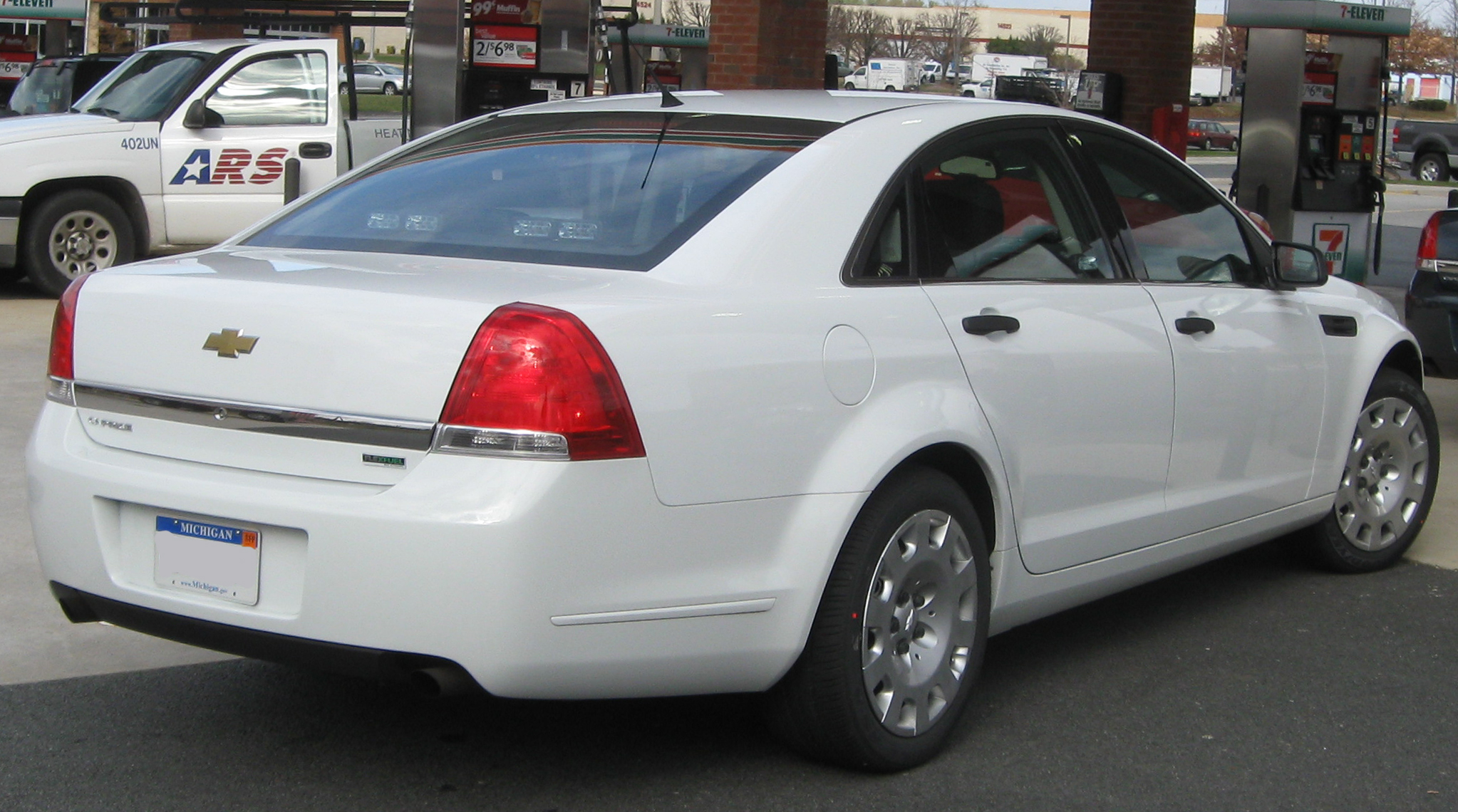
Chevrolet Caprice PPV (US)

On October 5, 2009, General Motors announced the Chevrolet Caprice Police Patrol Vehicle (PPV).

The Caprice PPV was based on a previous Australian-built export to the Middle East, the Chevrolet Caprice LS (which was based on the Holden Caprice WM series I, sold only in the Australasian market). The front end and grille were the same as the 2007–2010 Caprice LS.

While the 2009 onward Chevrolet Caprice was officially sold only to law enforcement agencies in the US, some vehicles evidently have been purchased by private individuals via dealers. These included demonstrator vehicles, excess unsold dealer inventory, and purchases for demonstration use by upfitters and related businesses.

The Caprice PPV was imported from Australia as a captive import of the Holden Caprice (WM series), rather than the short-wheelbase Holden Commodore (VE), which was sold in a police pack in Australia. (However, these cars were both designed on GM's Zeta platform.

Australian-built Chevrolet Caprices featured either the 6.0 L L77 AFM V8, which was standard in 2011 and optional from 2012; or the standard 3.6 L LLT SIDI V6 engine, that became available nine months later. Both engines were E85 ethanol-capable.

The Caprice police car had a generally positive reception, placing perfect scores in an assessment by The Los Angeles County Sheriff's Department, with the only criticism being directed at its over-cautious electronic stability control.

The Caprice logo was engraved into the chrome trim on the trunk, there was a PPV logo on the right side of the rear fascia and a FlexFuel nameplate, which was on GM vehicles in North America from 2007 through 2009. The PPV had dual exhausts, a floor shifter in the console, a prisoner partition with rifle and shotgun mounts, lights and siren controls in the console, 18-inch steel wheels and center caps from the Impala 9C1, and a touch screen in place of the radio and HVAC controls. A prototype similar to the concept car in LAPD was shown publicly in Australia by Holden. Another prototype tested by the LAPD had the same front end, grille, steel wheels, and center caps as the production models, while the car was based on the Series I WM Caprice with its rear bumper, colored turn signal indicators lamps on the side of the car, chrome trim with Caprice engraved on it, & V8 badge from the 2007–2010 Caprice.

Special features were added by Chevrolet for the Caprice Police Patrol Vehicle (PPV). The driver's seat had a special indentation made to accommodate a police officer's equipment belt. Special tuning, such as Performance Algorithm Liftfoot (PAL) calibration and a performance-tuned suspension was added for increased performance, for police needs.

Previously, the future of Holden's North American export program had been the subject of contradictory announcements, as General Motors emerged from bankruptcy. On July 11, 2009, Bob Lutz declared the Australian-built, Holden Commodore-based Pontiac G8 "too good to waste" and indicated it would return in the form of a Chevrolet Caprice. Initially, it was unclear whether the revived Caprice marque, in North America, would be based on the short-wheelbase Commodore (like the Pontiac G8) or the longer Holden/Chevrolet Caprice variants already sold in Australasia and the Middle East. Several days later, Lutz retracted his comment, citing market conditions, while GM CEO Frederick Henderson confirmed that police applications were being studied.

What also made the North America Caprice different from the preceding Caprice variants sold in Australasia and the Middle East was the lower end of the front bumper (based on the Holden Commodore Omega Series II front end), a honeycomb grille similar to the 2001–2011 Ford Crown Victoria Police Interceptor, and an interior from the Commodore Omega. (The latter was the common trim of the VE Commodore police packs sold in Australasia in 2007–2013.) An unmarked detective subvariant of the PPV used the same interior as the Middle East market variant Caprice LS, from 2007 to 2013.

Standard equipment on the Caprice PPV included keyless entry, power windows and door locks, a 6.5-inch, full-color LCD audio system called "Holden iQ" with auxiliary audio input and a single-disc CD player, a four-speaker front audio system with separate woofers and tweeters, full instrumentation with an integrated driver information center (DIC), air conditioning with dual-zone temperature controls for the driver and front passenger, dual front bucket seats with a power driver's seat adjuster, a cruise control, and front and rear cloth seating surfaces. Optional features included wiring for police lighting and sirens, an additional battery to power police-installed accessories, the disabling of the interior courtesy lamps and rear door window controls and door locks, eighteen-inch (18") plastic wheel covers, a vinyl rear bench seat, rubberized vinyl flooring and rear trunk mats, and a remote vehicle starter system.

For 2014, the Caprice PPV received a new seven-inch, Chevrolet MyLink touchscreen infotainment system as standard equipment, which now included Bluetooth for hands-free calling and wireless stereo audio streaming via A2DP, Pandora Internet Radio capabilities, and an integrated rearview backup camera display among other new features. The single-disc CD player was available for the 2014–2016 model years, but deleted for the 2017 model year. The dashboard was restyled with a new steering wheel that integrated cruise (speed), audio system, and Bluetooth voice controls, a new instrument cluster with a larger monochromatic LCD driver information center (DIC) screen, and revised controls (the new dashboard in the Caprice PPV was similar to the civilian Chevrolet SS sedan that was released for the 2014 model year). The gear selector lever for the six-speed automatic transmission was relocated from the center console to the dashboard directly next to the steering column, which freed up space in the center console for police-installed equipment, such as computers and radio equipment. In addition, the door panels were redesigned with more convenient control placement including dual-side trunk release buttons, and the front bucket seats were redesigned for greater officer comfort and support, with a new seat fabric for the cloth seats.

In 2017, General Motors closed the Holden Elizabeth Plant where the Caprice PPV was produced, ending production of both the civilian Chevrolet SS and Caprice PPV. The last PPV was produced on May 18, 2017. With the discontinuation of the 9C1 Chevrolet Impala Limited PPV after the 2017 model year, Chevrolet no longer offers a four-door sedan with a Police Package.

== Engines ==
Engines for United States models
Generation	Years	Engine	Power	Torque	Fuel	Exhaust	Notes
I	1965–1967	283 cu in Small-Block V8					
I	1965–1969	327 cu in Small-Block V8					
I	1965–1969	396 cu in Big-Block V8					
I	1966–1969	427 cu in Big-Block V8					
I	1968	307 cu in Small-Block V8					
I	1969–1970	350 cu in Small-Block V8					
I	1970	400 cu in Small-Block V8					
II	1971	400 cu in Small-Block V8	255 hp (190 kW)	390 lb⋅ft (529 N⋅m)	2-bbl	single	
II	1971	400 cu in Big-Block V8	300 hp (224 kW)	400 lb⋅ft (542 N⋅m)	4-bbl	single/dual	
II	1971	454 cu in Big-Block V8	365 hp (272 kW)	465 lb⋅ft (630 N⋅m)	4-bbl	single/dual	
II	1972	400 cu in Small-Block V8	170 hp (127 kW)	325 lb⋅ft (441 N⋅m)	2-bbl	single	
II	1972	400 cu in Big-Block V8	210 hp (157 kW)	320 lb⋅ft (434 N⋅m)	4-bbl	single	
II	1972	400 cu in Big-Block V8	240 hp (179 kW)	345 lb⋅ft (468 N⋅m)	4-bbl	dual	
II	1972	454 cu in Big-Block V8	230 hp (172 kW)	360 lb⋅ft (488 N⋅m)	4-bbl	single	
II	1972	454 cu in Big-Block V8	270 hp (201 kW)	390 lb⋅ft (529 N⋅m)	4-bbl	dual	
II	1973	400 cu in Small-Block V8	150 hp (112 kW)	295 lb⋅ft (400 N⋅m)	2-bbl	single	
II	1973	454 cu in Big-Block V8	215 hp (160 kW)	345 lb⋅ft (468 N⋅m)	4-bbl	single	
II	1973	454 cu in Big-Block V8	245 hp (183 kW)	375 lb⋅ft (508 N⋅m)	4-bbl	dual	
II	1974	400 cu in Small-Block V8	150 hp (112 kW)	295 lb⋅ft (400 N⋅m)	2-bbl	single	n/a CA
II	1974	400 cu in Small-Block V8	180 hp (134 kW)	290 lb⋅ft (393 N⋅m)	4-bbl	single	std CA, wagon
II	1974	454 cu in Big-Block V8	235 hp (175 kW)	360 lb⋅ft (488 N⋅m)	4-bbl	dual	n/a CA
II	1975	350 cu in Small-Block V8	145 hp (108 kW)	250 lb⋅ft (339 N⋅m)	2-bbl	single	n/a CA
II	1975	350 cu in Small-Block V8	155 hp (116 kW)	250 lb⋅ft (339 N⋅m)	4-bbl	single	CA only
II	1975	400 cu in Small-Block V8	175 hp (130 kW)	305 lb⋅ft (414 N⋅m)	4-bbl	single	
II	1975	454 cu in Big-Block V8	215 hp (160 kW)	350 lb⋅ft (475 N⋅m)	4-bbl	dual	n/a CA
II	1976	350 cu in Small-Block V8	145 hp (108 kW)	250 lb⋅ft (339 N⋅m)	2-bbl	single	n/a CA
II	1976	350 cu in Small-Block V8	165 hp (123 kW)	260 lb⋅ft (353 N⋅m)	4-bbl	single	
II	1976	400 cu in Small-Block V8	175 hp (130 kW)	305 lb⋅ft (414 N⋅m)	4-bbl	single	
II	1976	454 cu in Big-Block V8	225 hp (168 kW)	360 lb⋅ft (488 N⋅m)	4-bbl	dual	n/a CA
III	1977–1979	250 cu in Turbo-Thrift I6	110 hp (82 kW)	195 lb⋅ft (264 N⋅m)	1-bbl	single	
III	1977–1978	305 cu in Small-Block V8	145 hp (108 kW)	245 lb⋅ft (332 N⋅m)	2-bbl	single	
III	1977–1979	350 cu in Small-Block V8	170 hp (127 kW)	270 lb⋅ft (366 N⋅m)	4-bbl	single	
III	1979	305 cu in Small-Block V8	130 hp (97 kW)	245 lb⋅ft (332 N⋅m)	2-bbl	single	
III	1980–1984	229 cu in Chevrolet V6	110 hp (82 kW)	170 lb⋅ft (230 N⋅m)	2-bbl	single	n/a CA
III	1980–1984	231 cu in Buick V6	110 hp (82 kW)	190 lb⋅ft (258 N⋅m)	2-bbl	single	CA only
III	1980–1982	267 cu in Small-Block V8	115 hp (86 kW)	200 lb⋅ft (271 N⋅m)	2-bbl	single	n/a CA
III	1980	305 cu in LG4 Small-Block V8	155 hp (116 kW)	240 lb⋅ft (325 N⋅m)	4-bbl	single	
III	1980–1985	350 cu in LF9 Oldsmobile Diesel V8	105 hp (78 kW)	205 lb⋅ft (278 N⋅m)	FI	single	
III	1980–1988	350 cu in LM1 Small-Block V8			4-bbl	single	Police
III	1981–1984	305 cu in LG4 Small-Block V8	150 hp (112 kW)	240 lb⋅ft (325 N⋅m)	4-bbl	single	
III	1985	262 cu in Chevrolet V6	130 hp (97 kW)	210 lb⋅ft (285 N⋅m)	TBI	single	
III	1985–1986	305 cu in LG4 Small-Block V8	165 hp (123 kW)	245 lb⋅ft (332 N⋅m)	4-bbl	single	
III	1986–1988	4.3 L/262 cu in Chevrolet V6	140 hp (104 kW)	225 lb⋅ft (305 N⋅m)	TBI	single	
III	1986–1990	5.0 L/307 cu in LV2 Oldsmobile V8	140 hp (104 kW)	255 lb⋅ft (346 N⋅m)	4-bbl	single	
III	1987–88	5.0 L/305 cu in LG4 Small-Block V8	170 hp (127 kW)	250 lb⋅ft (339 N⋅m)	4-bbl	single	
III	1989–1990	4.3 L/262 cu in Chevrolet LB4 V6	140 hp (104 kW)	225 lb⋅ft (305 N⋅m)	TBI	single	police
III	1989–1990	5.0 L/305 cu in LO3 V8	170 hp (127 kW)	255 lb⋅ft (346 N⋅m)	TBI	single	
III	1989–1990	5.7 L/350 cu in LO5 Small-Block V8	190 hp (142 kW)	285 lb⋅ft (386 N⋅m)	TBI	single	police
V	1999–2003	3.8 L/229 cu in L36 V6	210 hp (157 kW)	229 lb⋅ft (310 N⋅m)			
V	2004–2006	3.8 L/229 cu in L36 V6	230 hp (172 kW)	236 lb⋅ft (320 N⋅m)			
V	1999–2003	5.7 L/346 cu in LS1 V8	330 hp (246 kW)	350 lb⋅ft (475 N⋅m)			
V	2004–2006	5.7 L/346 cu in LS1 V8	340 hp (254 kW)	354 lb⋅ft (480 N⋅m)			
VI	2007–2010	3.6 L/217 cu in LY7 V6	240 hp (179 kW)	243 lbf⋅ft (330 N⋅m)			
VI	2011–2017	3.6 L/217 cu in LFX V6	301 hp (224 kW)	265 lb⋅ft (359 N⋅m)		dual	police
VI	2011–2017	6.0 L/364 cu in L77 V8	355 hp (265 kW)	384 lb⋅ft (521 N⋅m)		dual	police
VI	2007–2010	6.0 L/364 cu in L98 V8	360 hp (268 kW)	391 lbf⋅ft (530 N⋅m)			

== South Africa (1975–1978) ==
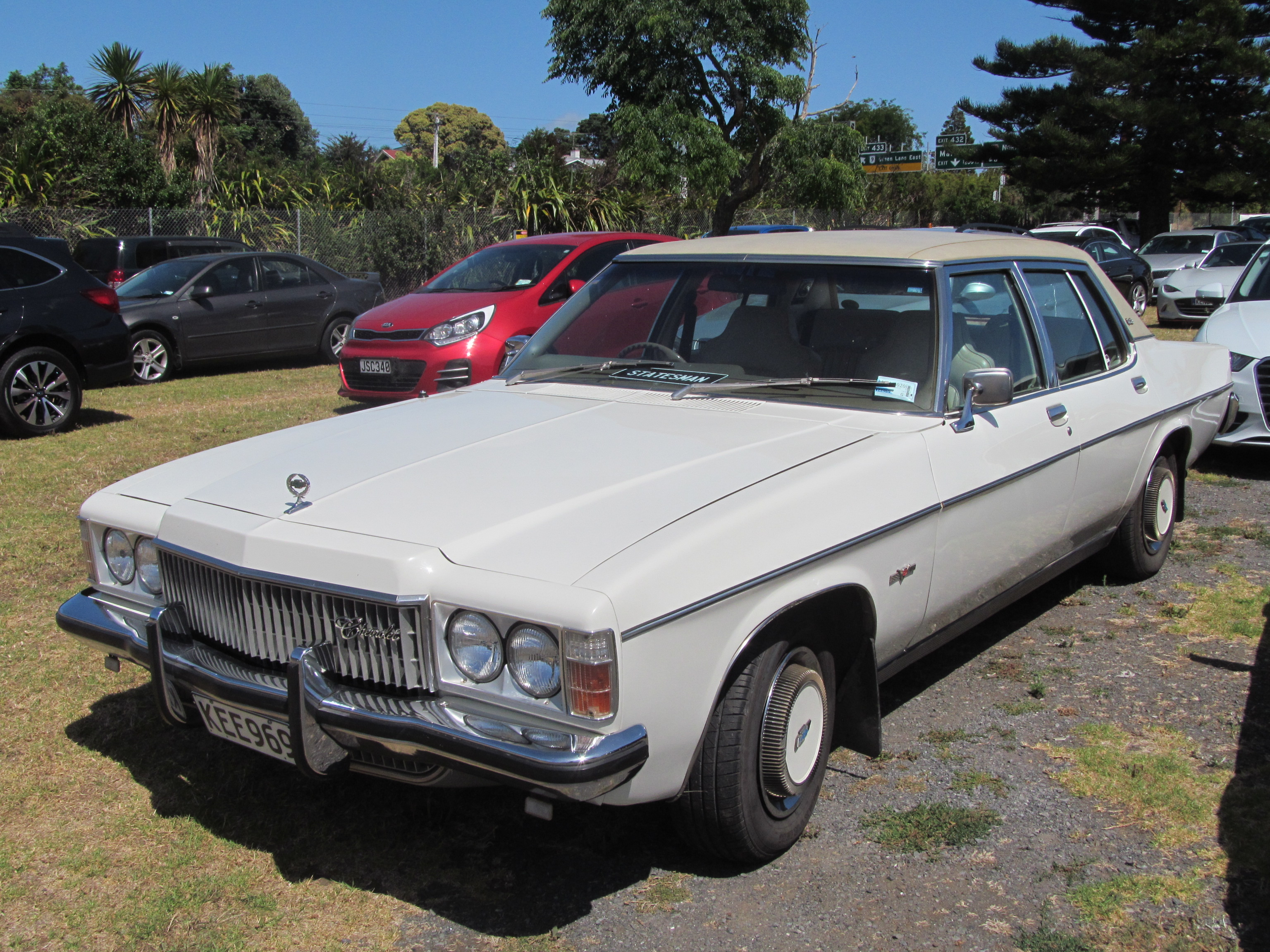
1976 Chevrolet Caprice Classic (South Africa)

From late 1975 through 1978, the Australian-developed Statesman Caprice was marketed in South Africa as the Chevrolet Caprice Classic. The V8-engined Caprice Classic received full equipment, with reading lights, air conditioning, and imported leather upholstery. It was very similar to the 5-liter Constantia, albeit fitted with a different grille, hubcaps, and a vinyl roof. After 1978, the Opel based Chevrolet Senator became GMSA's largest car on the market.

== See also ==
- Chevrolet Impala
