= Holden Caprice =

Full-size luxury car from Holden

Holden Caprice/Statesman
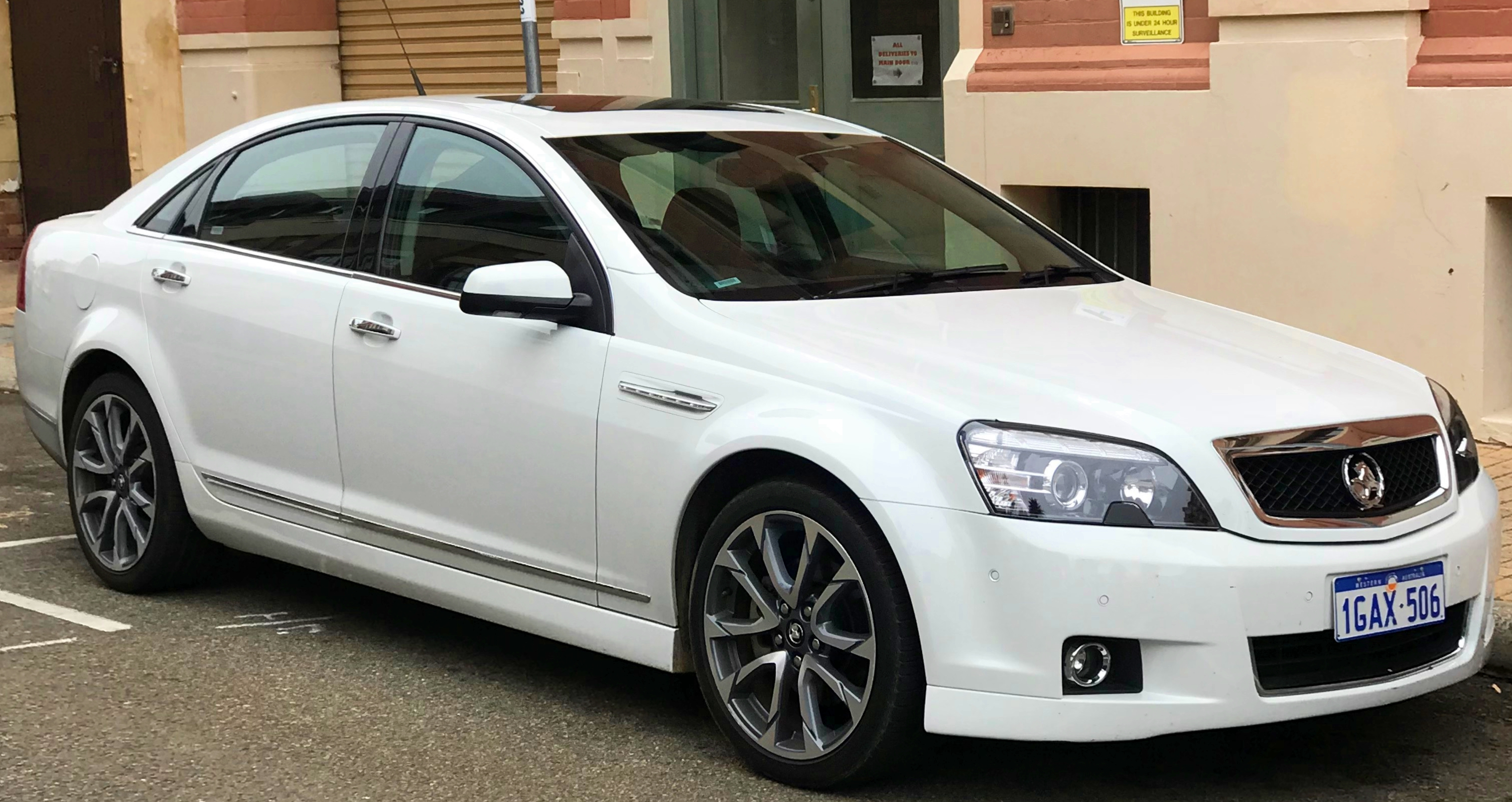
- Holden Caprice (WN II)

Overview
- Manufacturer: Holden (General Motors)
- Also called: Holden Statesman; HSV Grange; Buick Park Avenue; Buick Royaum; Chevrolet Caprice; Daewoo Veritas; Daewoo Statesman
- Production: March 1990 – October 2017
- Assembly: Australia: Adelaide, South Australia (Elizabeth)

Body and chassis
- Class: Full-size luxury car (F)
- Body style: 4-door sedan
- Layout: Front-engine, rear-wheel drive
- Platform: GM V (1990–2006); GM Zeta (2006–2017)
- Related: Holden Commodore; Bitter Vero; Buick Park Avenue; CSV La Classe

Chronology
- Predecessor: Statesman
- Successor: Holden Caprice (WM)

The Holden Caprice is a full-size luxury car which was produced by Holden in Australia from 1990 to October 2017. The similar Holden Statesman, which was also introduced in 1990 as a model below the Caprice, was discontinued in September 2010. Between 1971 and 1985, Holden marketed their long-wheelbase sedans under the Statesman marque.

Statesman and Caprice are essentially long-wheelbase variants of the Commodore range, and as of 2006, were the largest rear-wheel drive sedans offered by GM. Internationally, Statesmans and Caprices have been rebadged as the Buick Royaum, Daewoo Statesman, and Chevrolet Caprice. In addition, these cars have formed the basis of the Chinese-built Buick Park Avenue and the Bitter Vero, a rebodied version from Germany.

The main difference between the Statesman and the Caprice lies within their equipment packages. Moreover, Caprices are commonly powered by V8 engines rather than V6s and, whilst modern Caprices may be mistaken as fully specified versions of the cheaper Statesman, the two were separate Holden models in the past. In appearance, Caprices can be distinguished by their unique interior and exterior trim such as the grille insert. In addition to the large V8 engine, in latter years, the Caprice suspension was often more sport-oriented (from the 2003 WK series).

Traditionally in Australia, the Statesman and Caprice have been direct rivals to the Ford Fairlane and LTD, respectively. However, Ford's decision to discontinue these models in 2007 left Holden with the Chrysler 300C as the only direct competition at pricing point occupied, at least until the launch of the Hyundai Genesis in 2015. As announced by Holden in 2014, its entire Australian production comprising the Caprice ceased in 2017.

== Etymology ==
The word "caprice" means impulsive, unpredictable or sudden condition, or series of changes or a brief romance.

== Statesman (HQ–WB; 1971–1984) ==
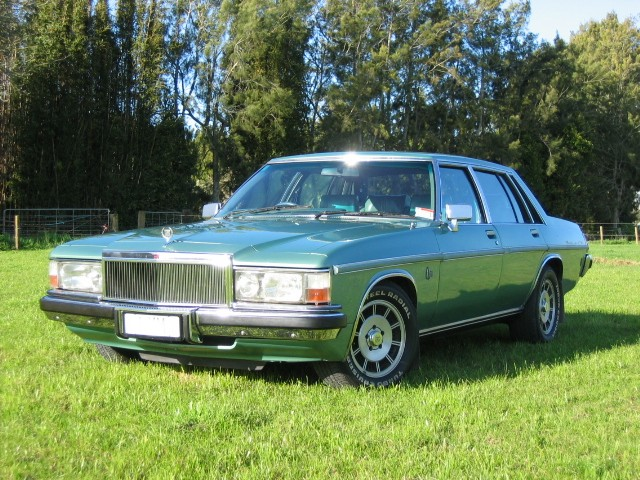
1980–1983 Statesman WB Caprice

It was the right car at the wrong time. A few years later people woke up to the fact that the WB was one of the best big Holdens of all time, and the values of used examples took off with a lion's roar.

— Tony Davis and John Wright, 1994.

Prior to the introduction of the Holden Statesman and Caprice models in 1990, Holden marketed its long-wheelbase sedan range through a separate Statesman marque, absent of all "Holden" branding. These original vehicles, were sold through the General Motors-Holden's dealership channel, and were based on the mainstream Holden range (Belmont, Kingswood, Monaro and Premier), offering more luxury, additional length than the Holden sedan and coupe models (the Statesman shared the same wheelbase as the Holden Wagon, Utility and Panel Van), and styling to differentiate it from the smaller Holden sedans. The first of such cars were introduced in 1971 as the HQ series Statesman, replacing the short-lived Holden Brougham. Although designed specifically for the Australian market, front end styling of the Statesman Caprice bears a strong resemblance to the 1971 North American Chevrolet Caprice. Subsequent HJ, HX and HZ models were updates to the original HQ bodywork, as was the final WB series which introduced a new six-window glasshouse. WB represented the most significant update yet, with only the front doors and bonnet common with the HZ sheetmetal. Notwithstanding these alterations, the WB fell short of great market success, that is, until 1984 when production cessation was announced, generating a rapid sales ascent. For Holden, the decision had been made—the line's discontinuance was irreversible.

== First generation (1990–1999) ==
=== VQ ===
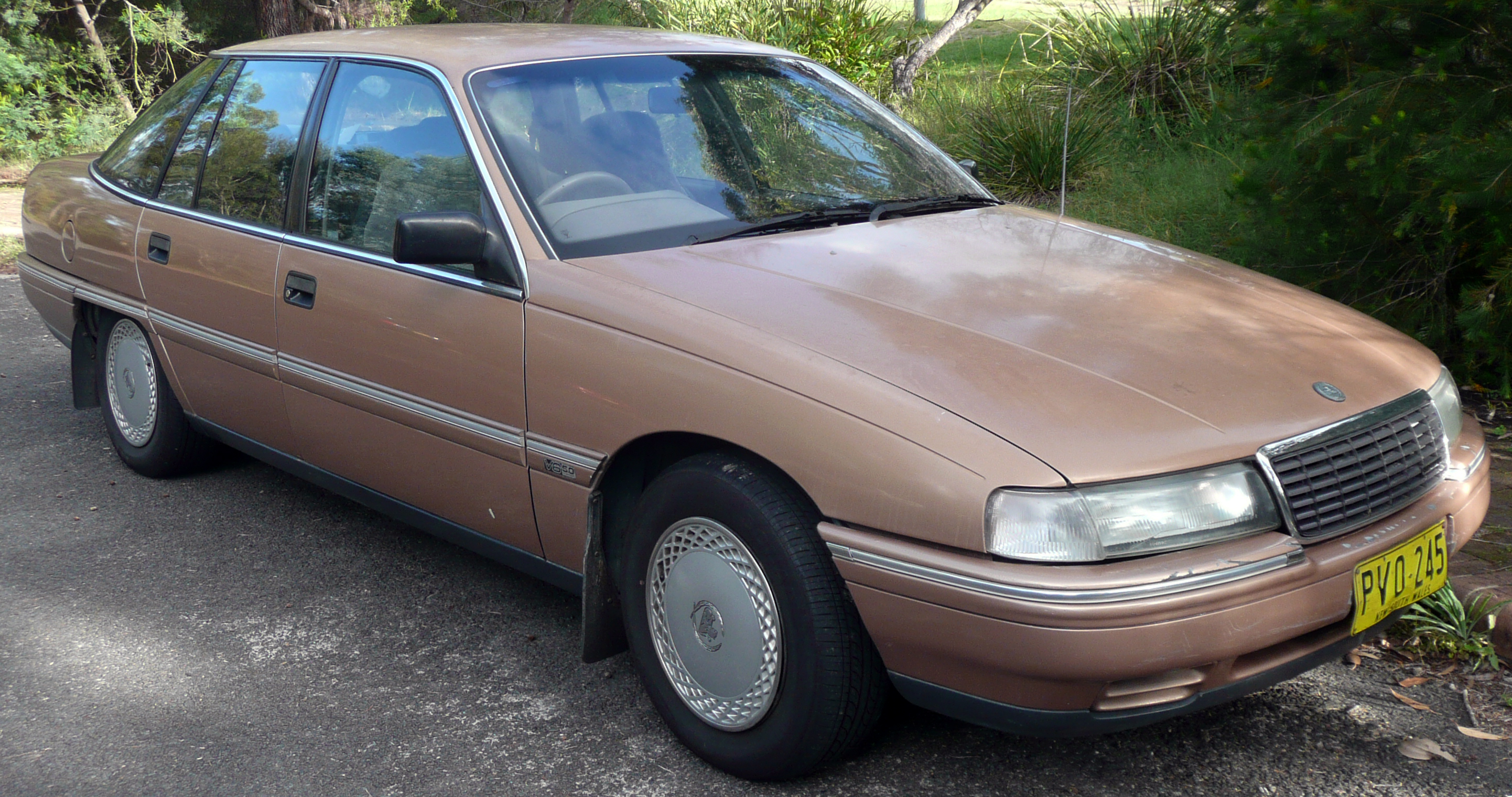

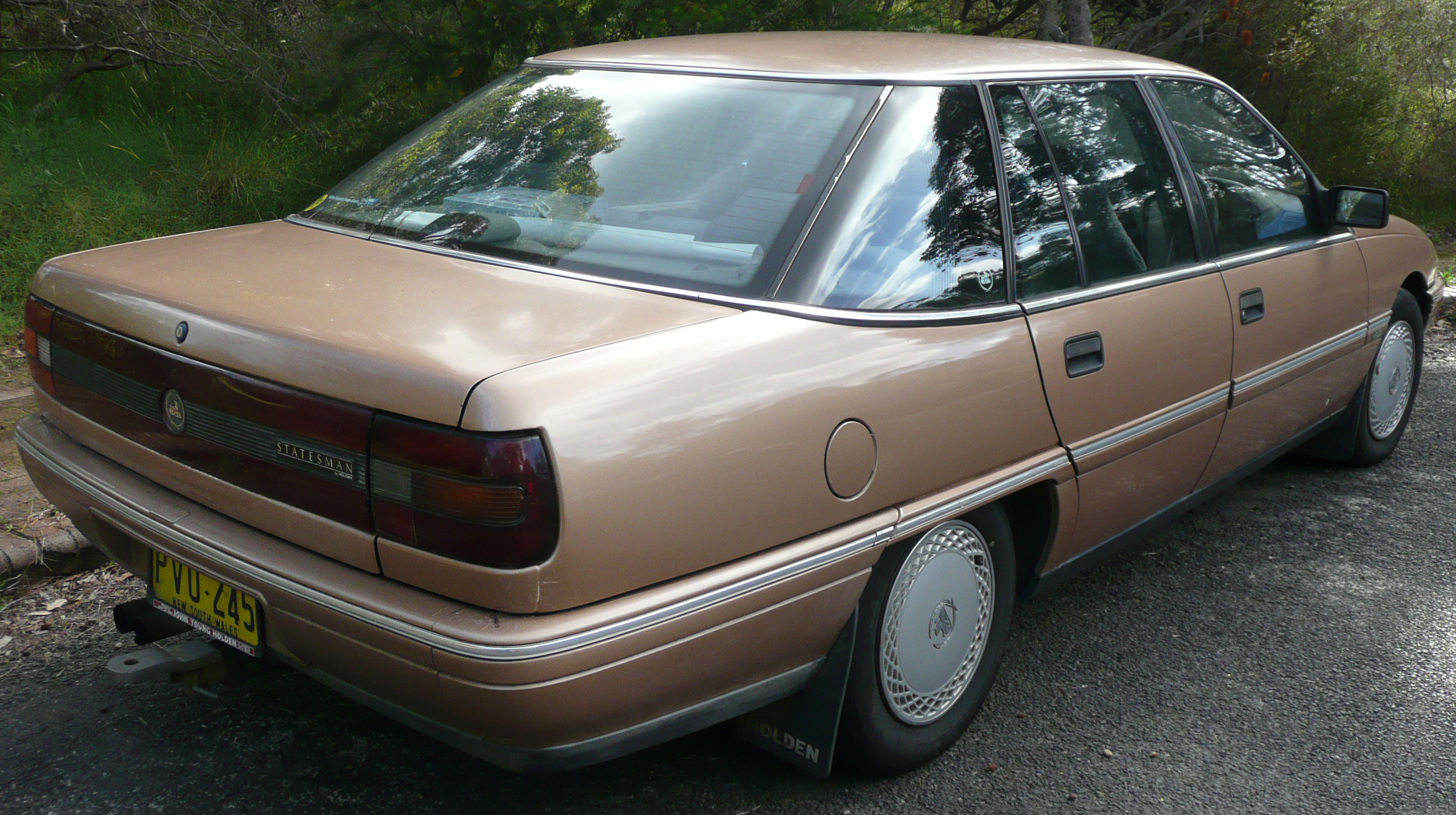
1990–1991 Holden Statesman (VQ)

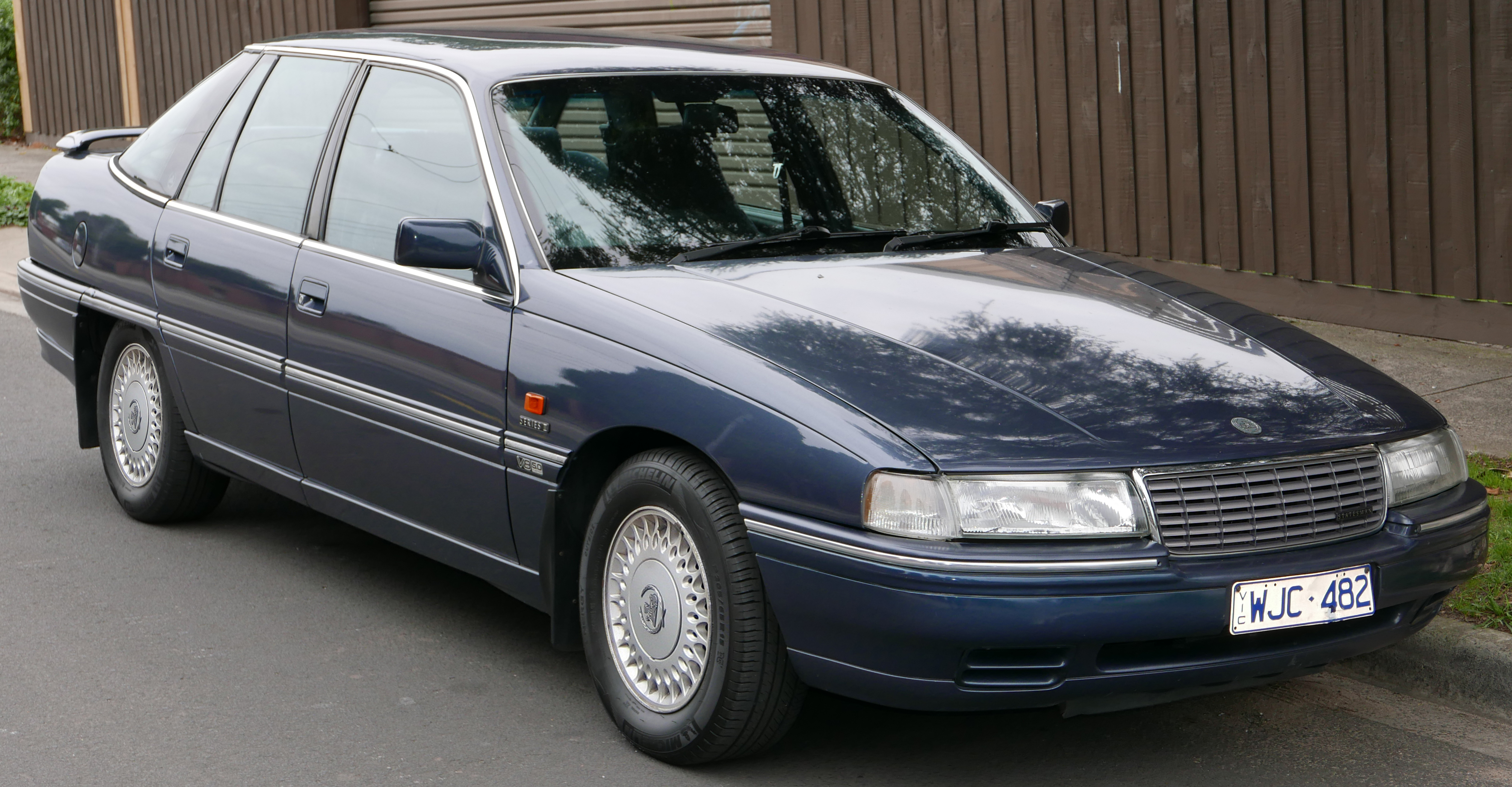
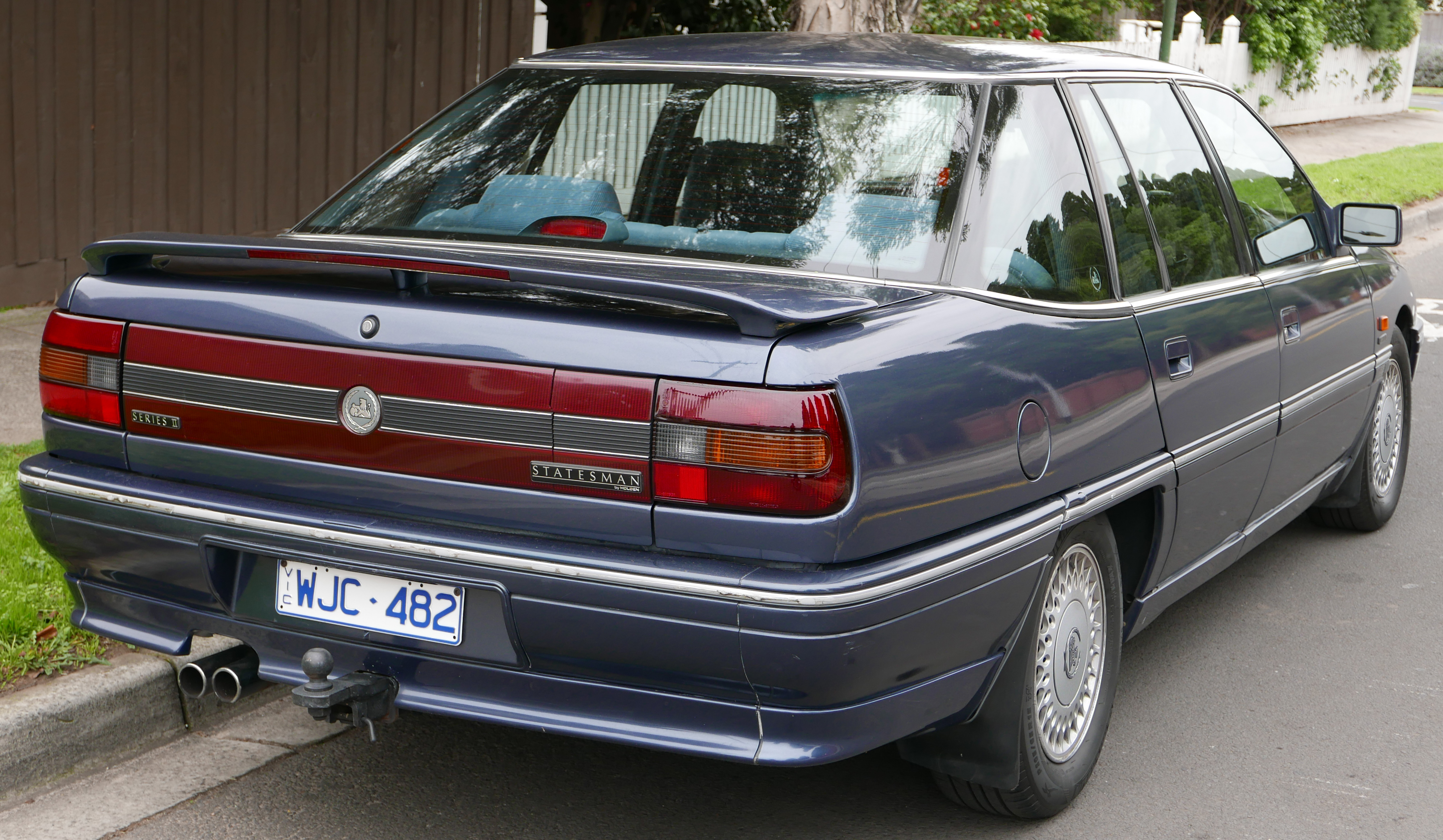

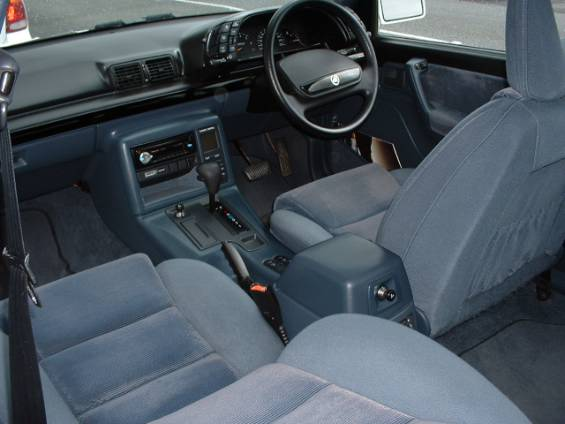
1991–1993 Holden Statesman (VQ II)

In March 1990, after a six-year hiatus since the WB Statesman's dismissal, demand for a long-wheelbase luxury sedan in Australia saw Holden resurrect the Statesman and Caprice names. Given the model designation VQ, these new luxury models utilised the long-wheelbase chassis taken from the VN Commodore station wagon, as opposed to the VN sedan's short-wheelbase. These VN models were in turn heavily revised and enlarged versions of the Opel Omega A. In comparison to the regular Commodore sedan, VQs added an additional 110 mm (4.3 in) of length, and were still 64 mm (2.5 in) longer than the VN wagon.

Holden made many efforts to distinguish the Statesman from the Commodore, on which it is based. These features include a formal grille and a very different glasshouse reminiscent of contemporary GM products such as the Oldsmobile Cutlass Supreme (see image), and the rear license plate repositioned to the bumper, while incorporating the doors and headlights from the Commodore station wagon. Both Statesman and Caprice models were offered and equipped with independent rear suspension—a feature introduced one year later on high-end VP Commodores. Also in 1991, Holden introduced the VQ Series II models. The Series II Caprice ushered anti-lock brakes as standard, however it was optional on the Statesman. The Commodore's 127 kW (170 hp) 3.8-litre 3800 V6 engine was now optional on the Statesman only, with the old 5.0-litre V8 remaining standard across the range. Both powerplants were mated with a four-speed THM700R4 automatic transmission.

Holden Special Vehicles offered several different versions of the VQ Statesman and Caprice, with enhanced performance and appearance. These vehicles were designated as HSV Statesman 5000i, SV90 and SV93.

=== VR ===
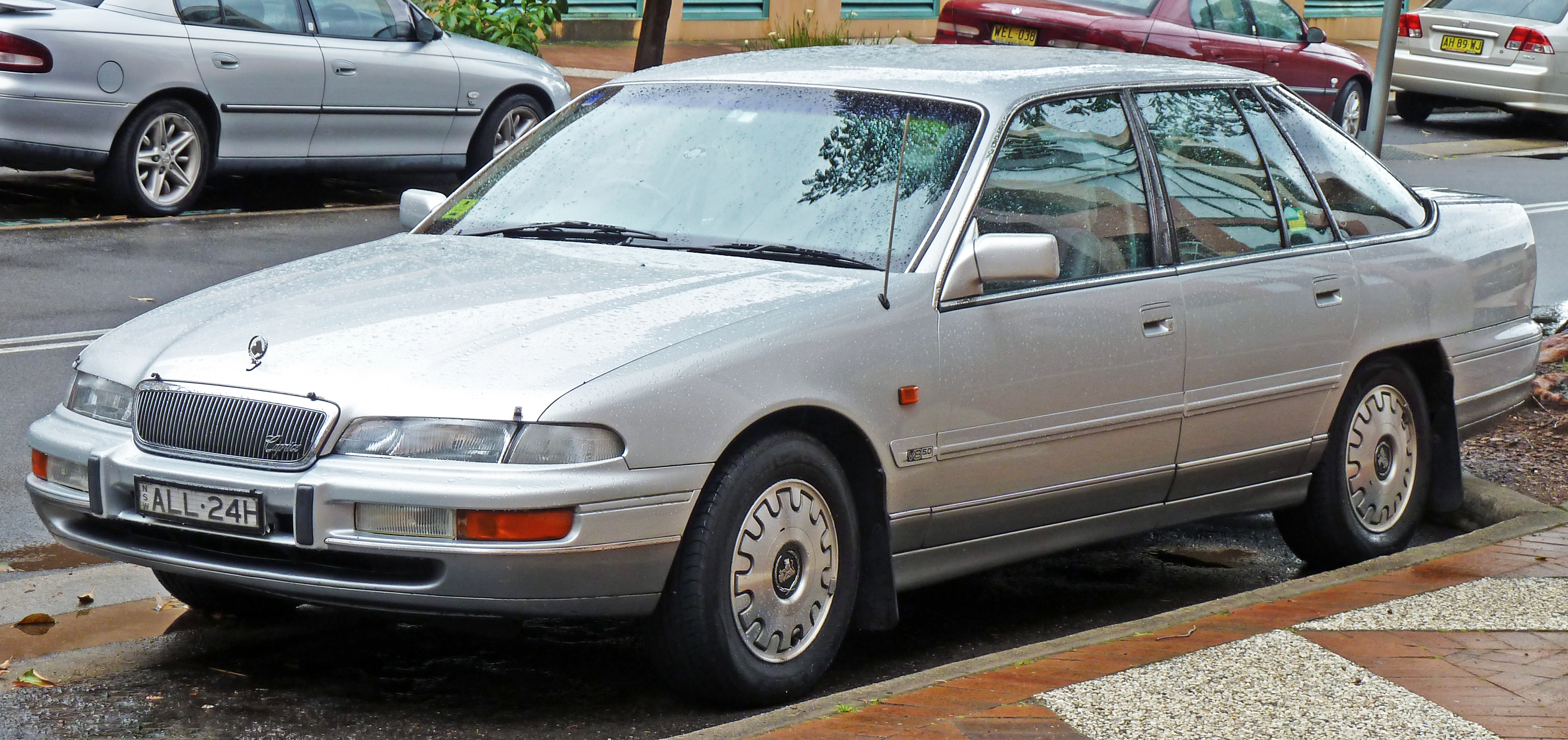

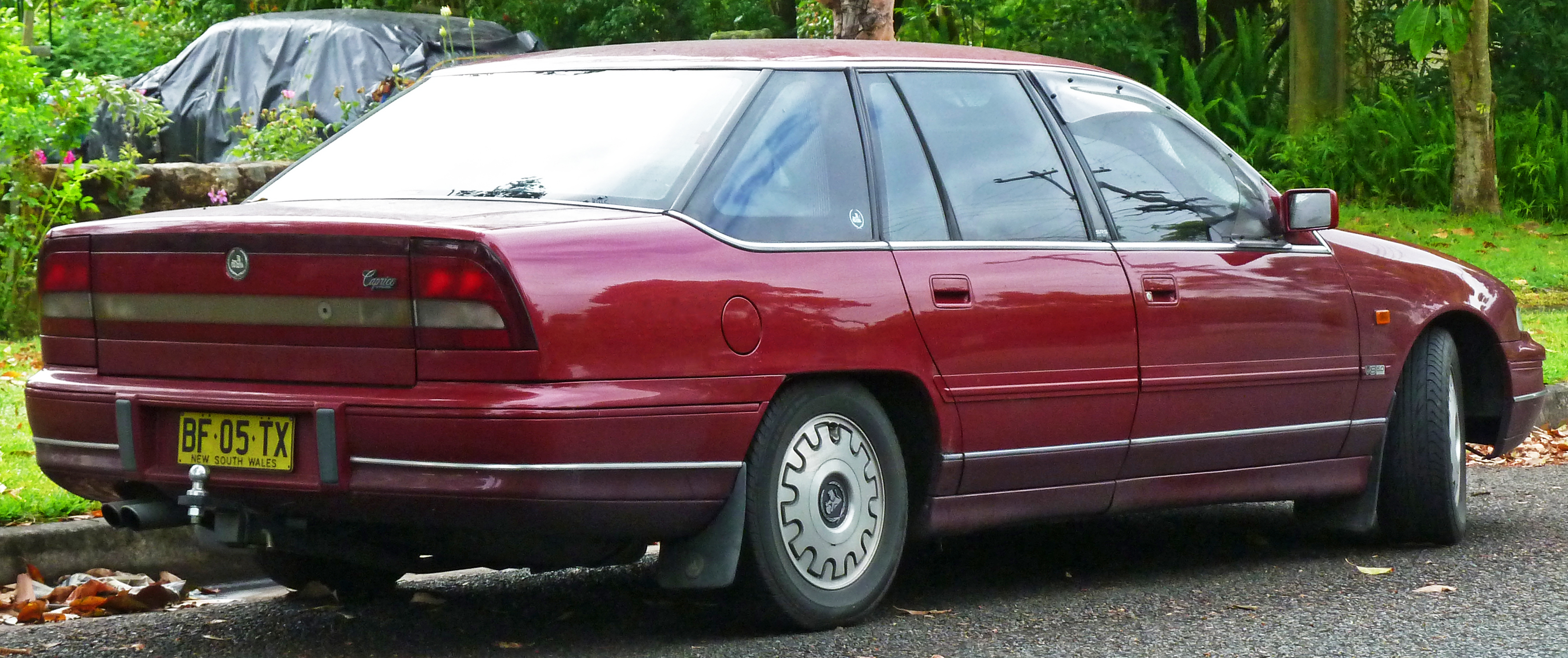
1994–1995 Holden Caprice (VR)

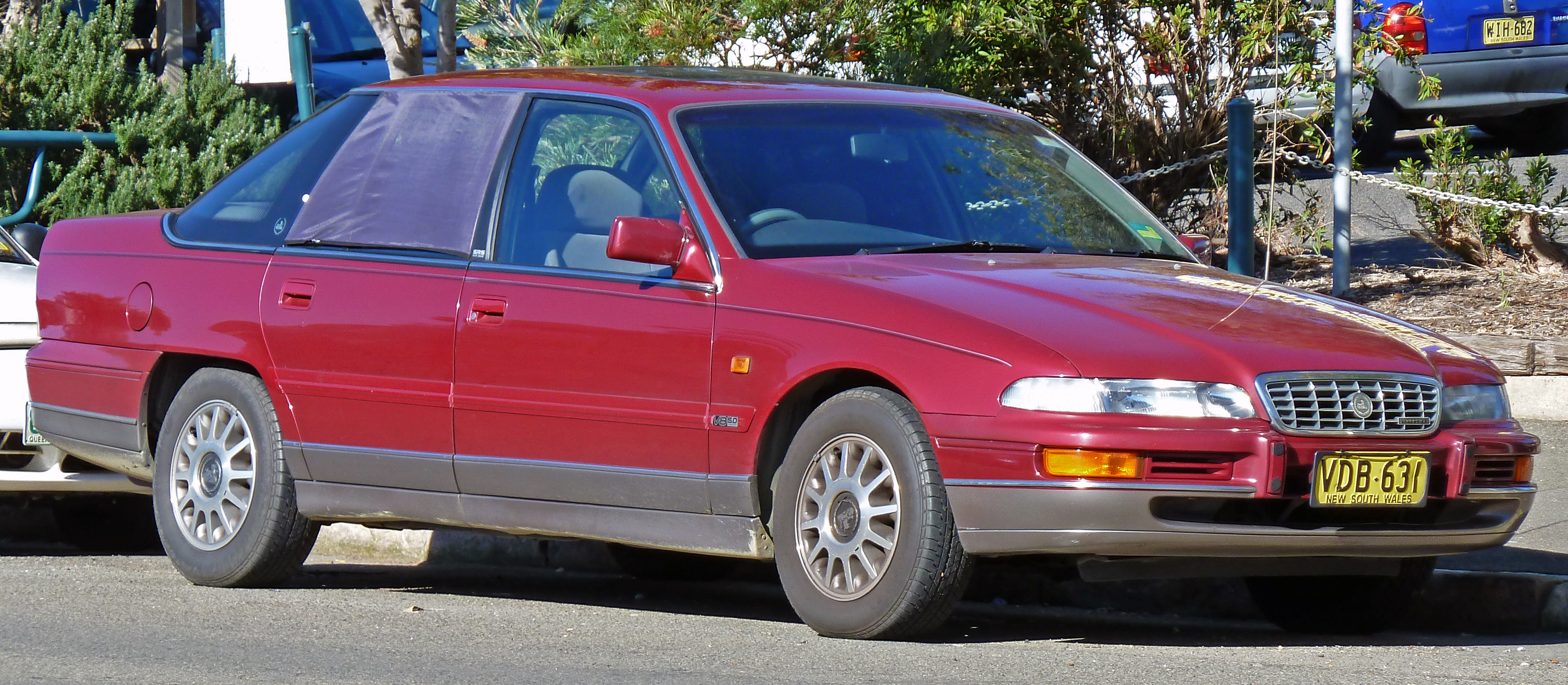

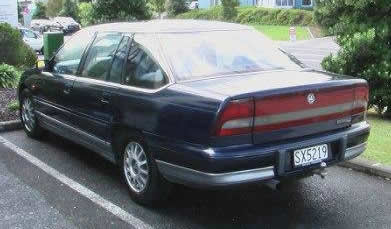
1994–1995 Holden Statesman (VR)

The VR followed in March 1994, mirroring the model change of the standard VR Commodore, incorporating engineering improvements as well as sheet metal changes. The updated running gear included a new electronically controlled version of the GM 4L60-E automatic transmission, and the latest revision of the Buick 3.8-litre V6 engine. The engine now featured rolling-element bearings in the valve rocker arms, increasing compression ratios from the VQ II series engine. The revised V6 was now standard on the Statesman and available for the very first time as an option on the Caprice. These changes combined to deliver an increase in power to 130 kW (174 hp) and further improvement in noise, vibration, and harshness levels. In terms of equipment, a driver's airbag became standard on both the Statesman and Caprice.

For the VR series, Holden no longer used separate model designations for its Statesman and Caprice. Instead, they adopted the same two-letter title as the Commodore. This same principle applied for the VS models, but not for those succeeding it.

=== VS ===
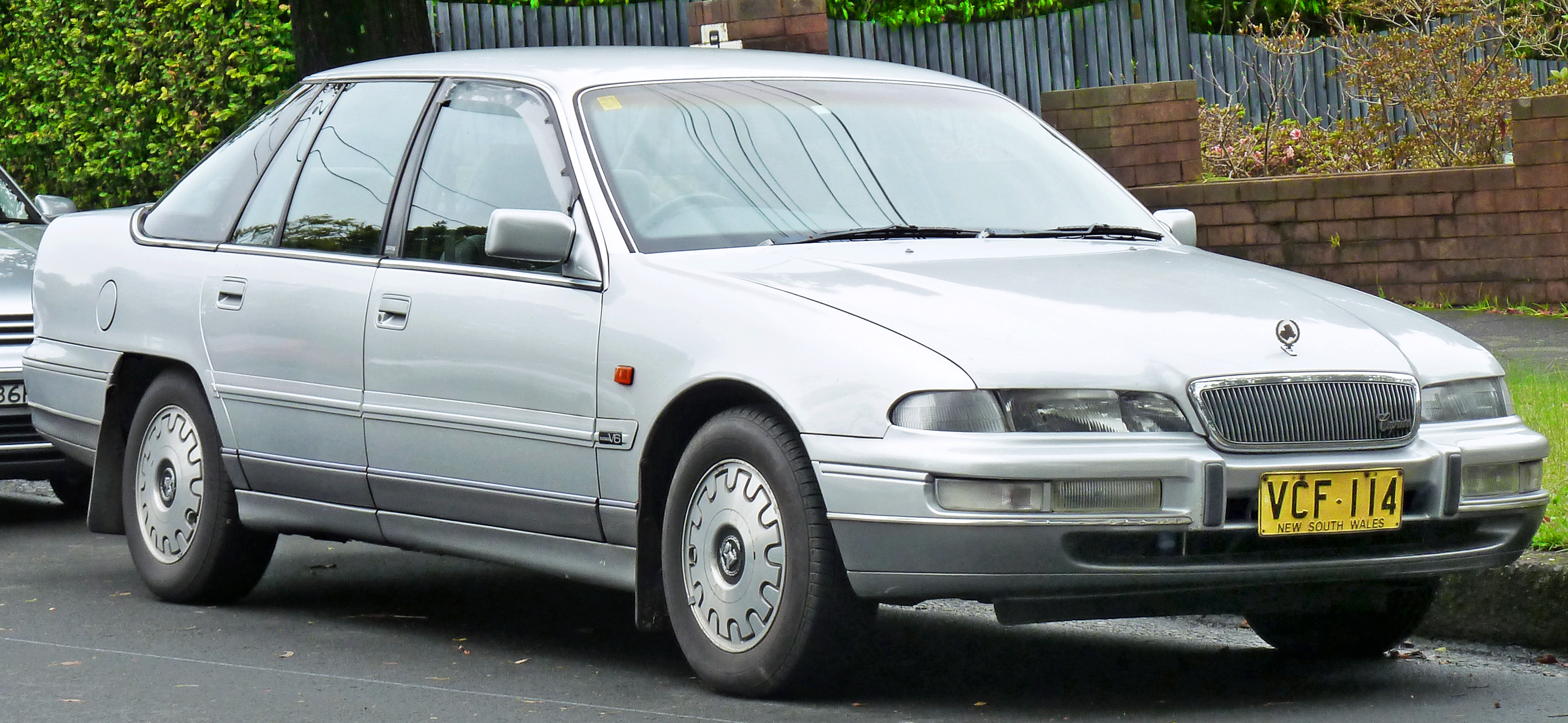

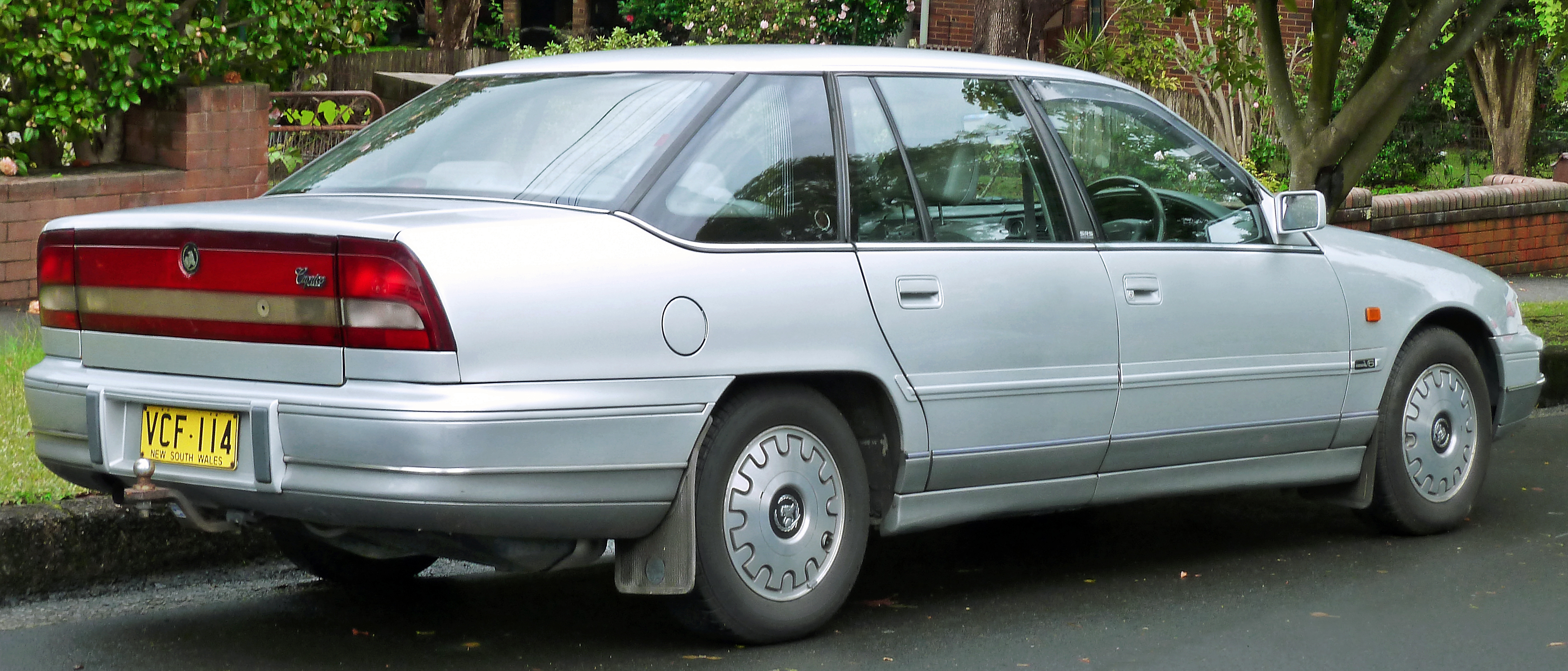
1995–1996 Holden Caprice (VS)

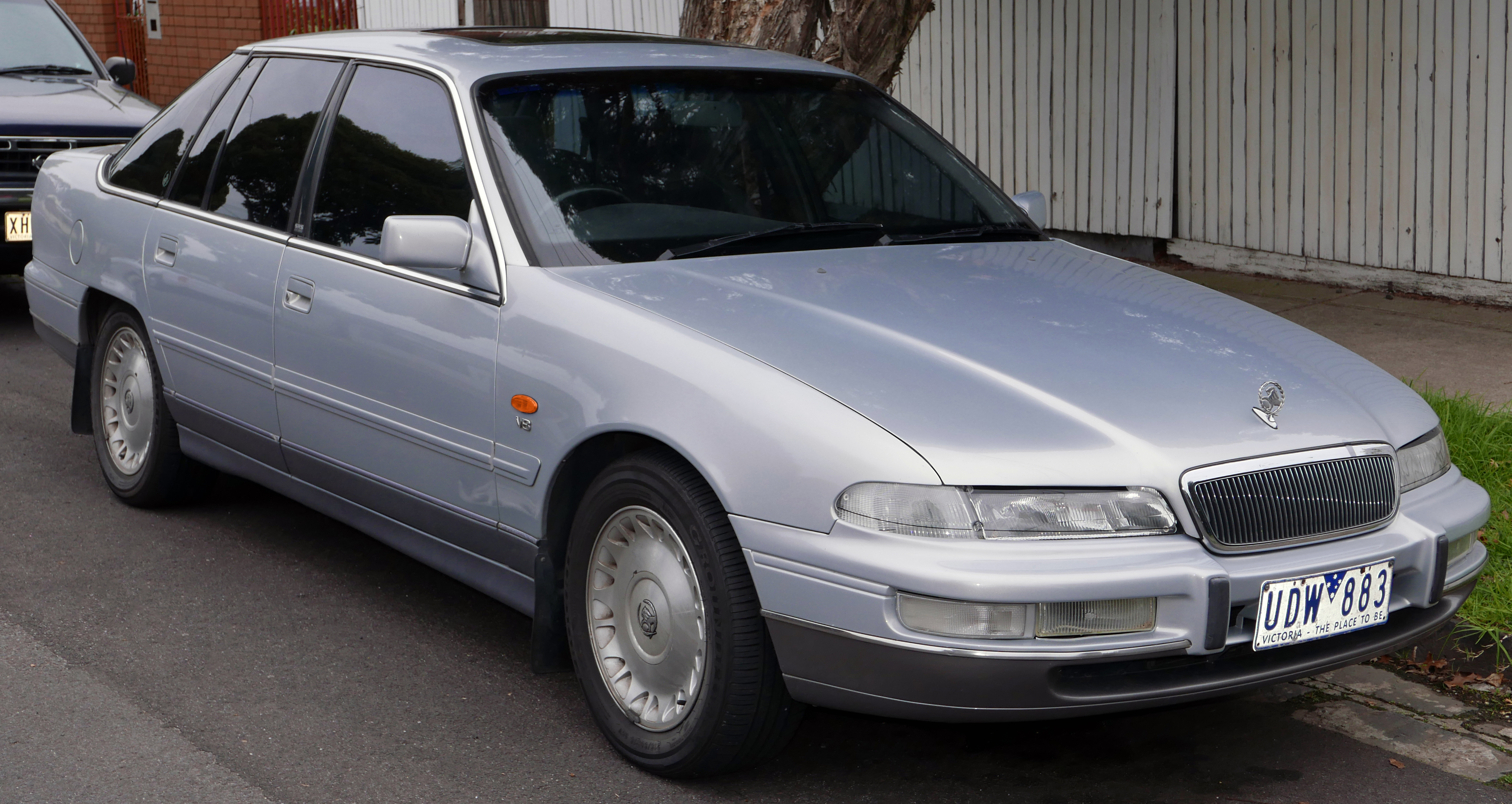

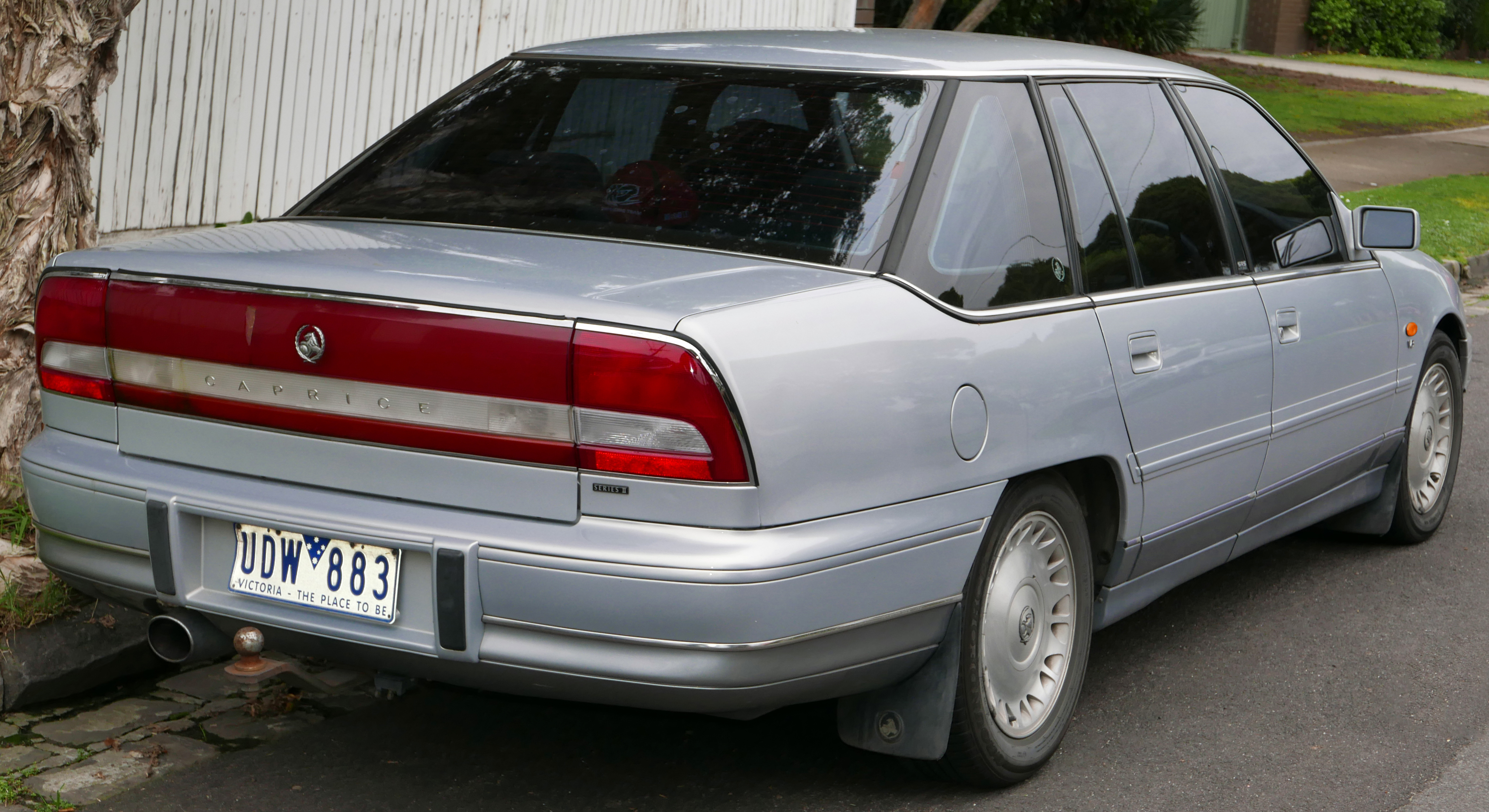
1996–1998 Holden Caprice (VS II)

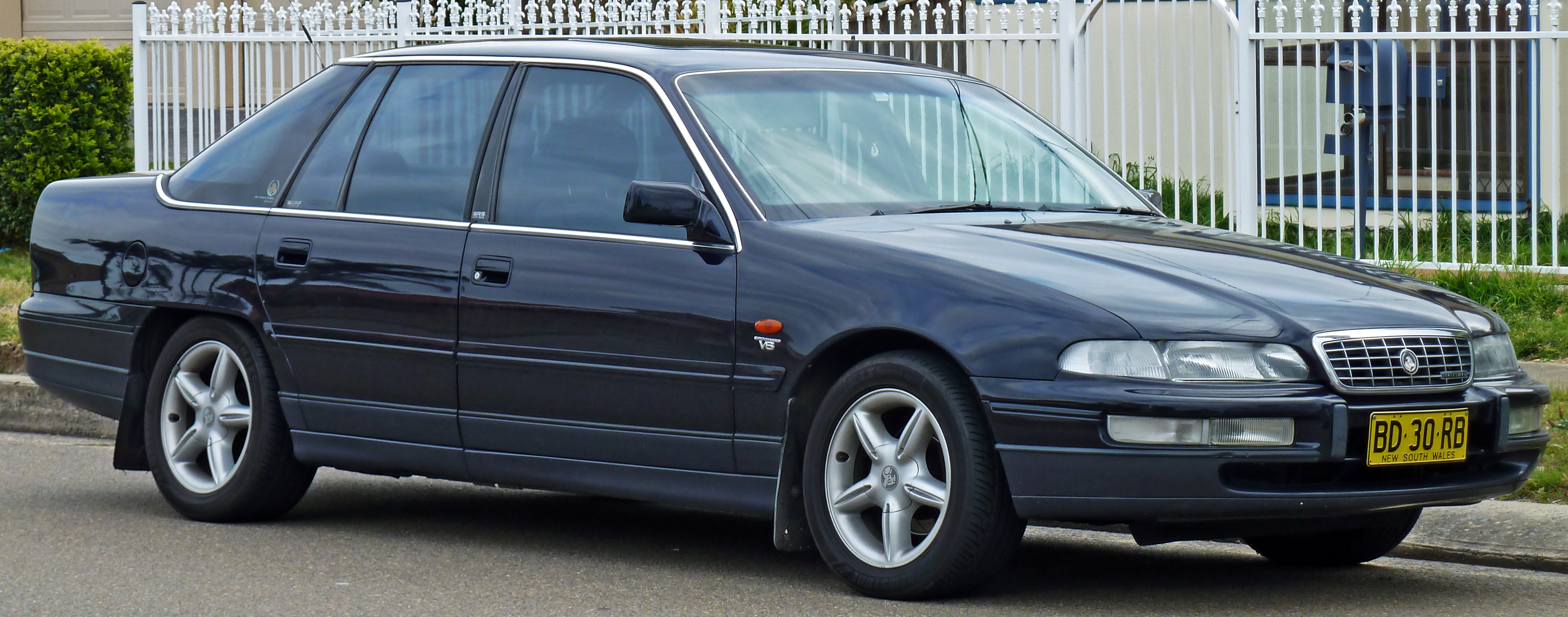

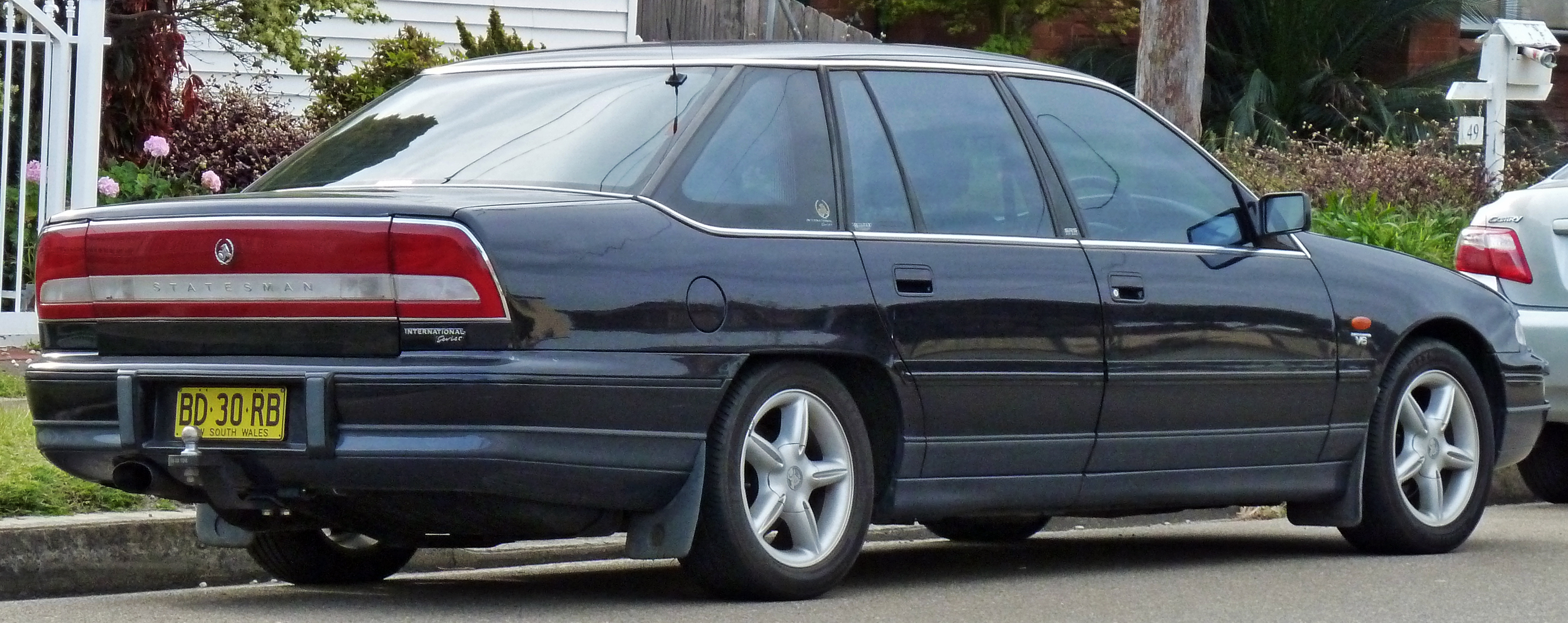
1996–1998 Holden Statesman (VS II)

The VS, launched in April 1995, saw the introduction of the updated Ecotec (Emissions and Consumption Optimisation through TEChnology) version of the Buick V6 engine which coincided with the changes to the engine in the United States. The Ecotec engine packed 13 percent more power, an increase of 17 kilowatts (23 hp) over the VR. Holden mated the new engine with a modified version of the GM 4L60-E automatic transmission, bringing improved throttle response and smoother changes between gears. Series II and III revisions came in September 1996 and June 1998, mainly consisting of a more rounded rear treatment and new alloy wheel designs. The Series II also heralded the introduction of the L67 Supercharged V6. This engine slotted in between the existing V6 and V8 engines and was officially rated at 165 kW (221 hp), just 3 kW (4.0 hp) below the V8, though a 185 kW (248 hp) HSV option for the 5.0-litre V8 was available. A special edition Statesman International was briefly offered in October 1995 and again as a Series II in February 1997.

For the Statesman, Holden included the ten-stack CD changer from the VR Caprice as standard. A new two-stage door remote was also made standard across the range. The remote, located on the key fob allows for just the driver's door to be unlocked. Safety-wise, a passenger airbag was introduced as standard in the VS range, following the introduction of a driver's airbag on the VR series. The Used Car Safety Ratings, undertaken by the Monash University Accident Research Centre, found that first generation Statesmans (VQ–VS) provide an "average level" of occupant safety protection in the event of an accident.

HSV released the HSV Grange model in October 1996 (as part of VS II) as a sports variant of the Caprice. Manufactured at Elizabeth, South Australia, and finished by HSV at Clayton, Victoria, the Grange was available in 185i and 215i variants, powered by 5.0- and stroked 5.7-litre V8 engines, respectively. The VS Grange was the first Grange produced by HSV, having previously produced Statesman and Caprice models under its own brand. Standard features for the VS II Grange included 17-inch alloy wheels, a ten-speaker sound system with a ten-disc CD stacker, climate control air conditioning, a power adjustable driver's seat (with memory settings), leather upholstery, cruise control, front fog lights, a leather-wrapped steering wheel, remote central locking, power windows and mirrors, telescopic steering wheel adjustment, a trip computer, power sunroof, woodgrain interior trim, an alarm and immobiliser. The 215i variants were also fitted with a Hydratrak limited slip differential.

== Second generation (1999–2006) ==
=== WH ===
The next model came in June 1999, almost two years after the launch of the all-new VT Commodore from which the new WH was initially based. The WH series saw Holden return to a standalone model designation, rather than adopting the same used by the short-wheelbase Commodore. Models followed much the same pattern as the previous car: a standard Statesman, a special edition Statesman International, and the Caprice as flagship. The doors and front windscreen were again shared with the mainstream Commodore while wheelbase was increased to 2,939 mm (116 in). WH Series I cars built between June 1999 and October 2000 had more in common with VT II Commodore, while WH Series II cars built between October 2000 and May 2003 bore more resemblance to the updated VX Commodore in parts and finish.

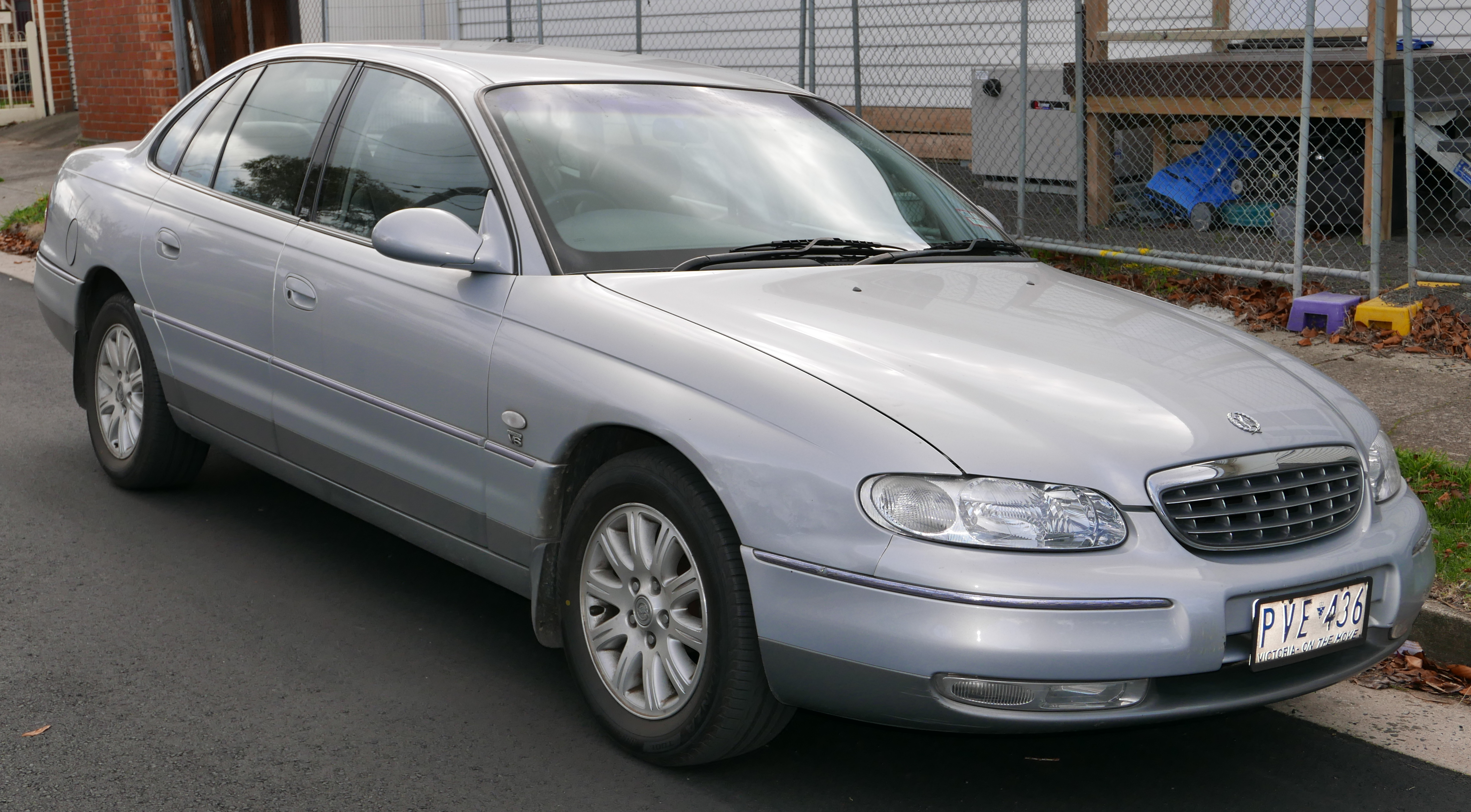

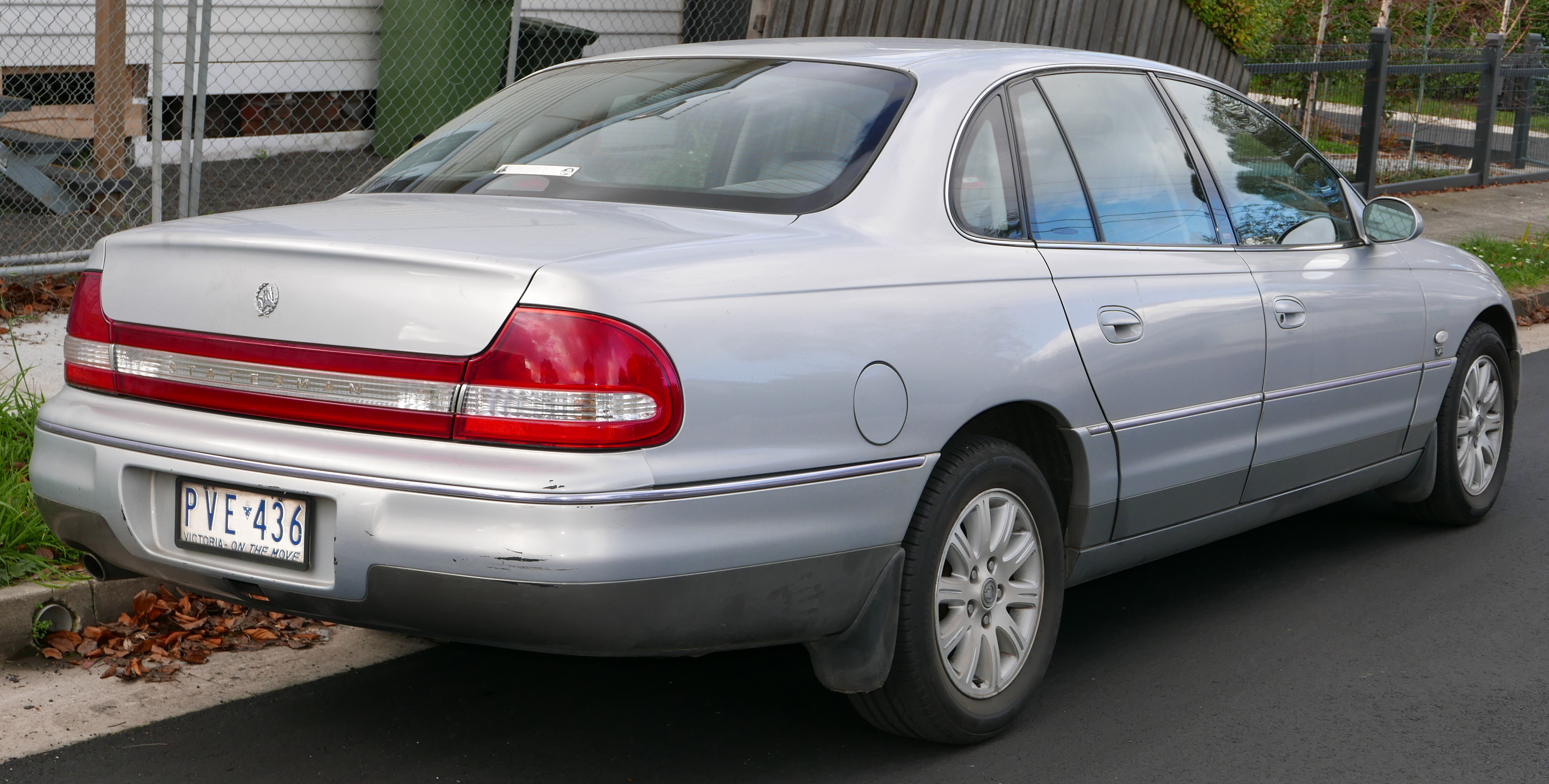
1999–2000 Holden Statesman (WH)

Engines were as per the Commodore, so a 3.8-litre V6 Ecotec unit, a supercharged version of the same, and a new 5.7-litre Generation III V8, rated at 220 kW (295 hp). A Series II revision brought a 5 kW (6.7 hp) power increase for the Ecotec V6 bringing it up to 152 kW (204 hp). Since the WH, which was engineered for both right- and left-hand drive, the Statesman has been exported to the Middle East as the Chevrolet Caprice, following the same model changes as the Holden.

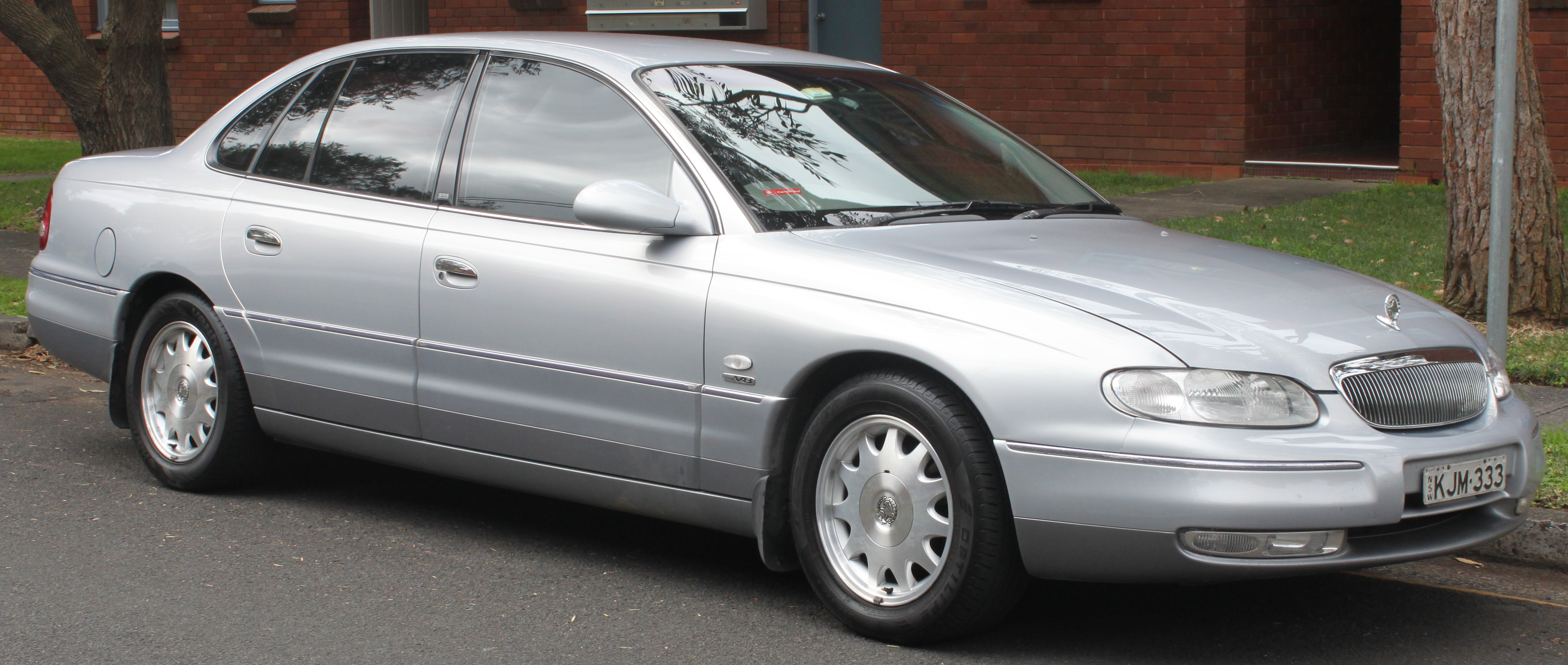
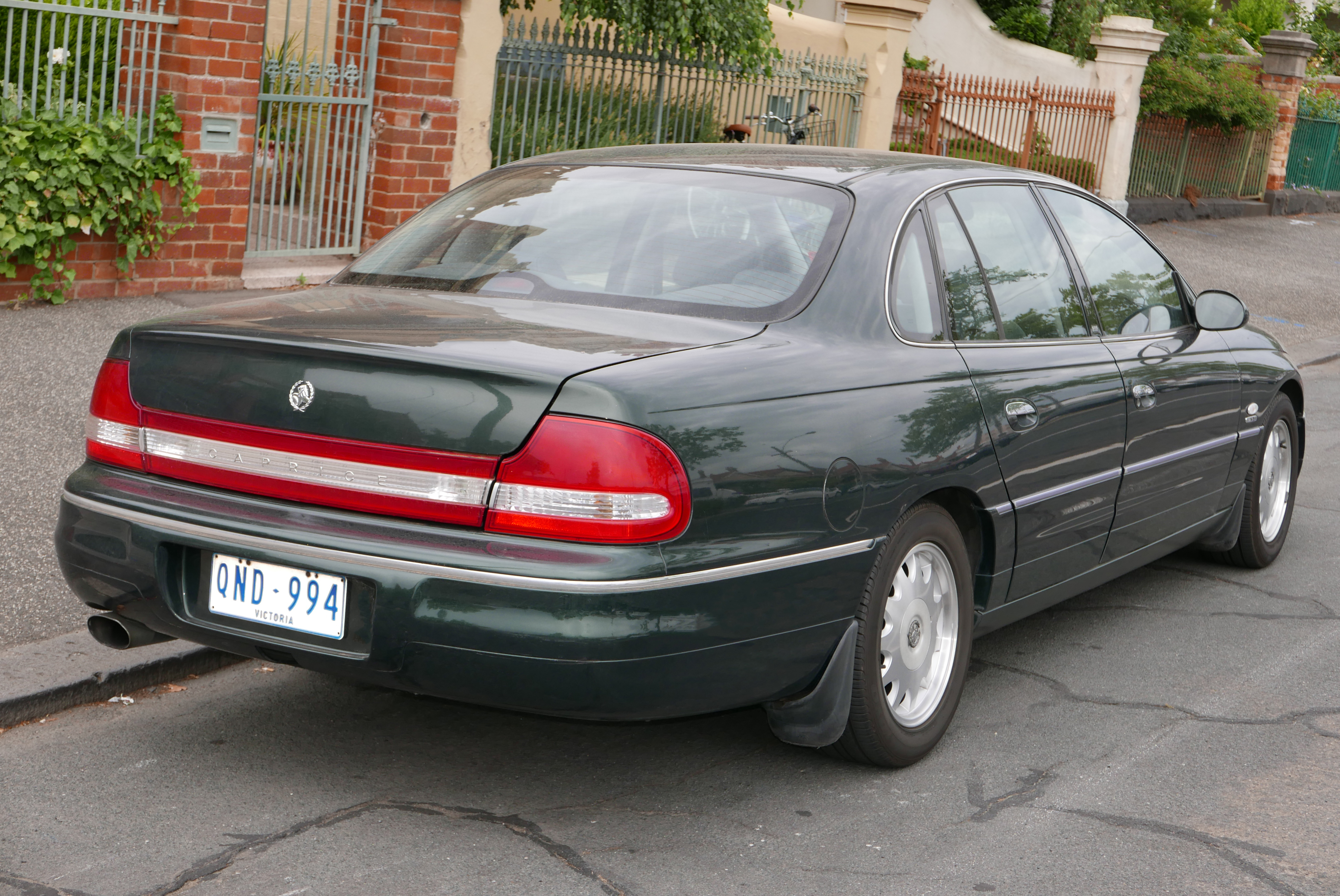

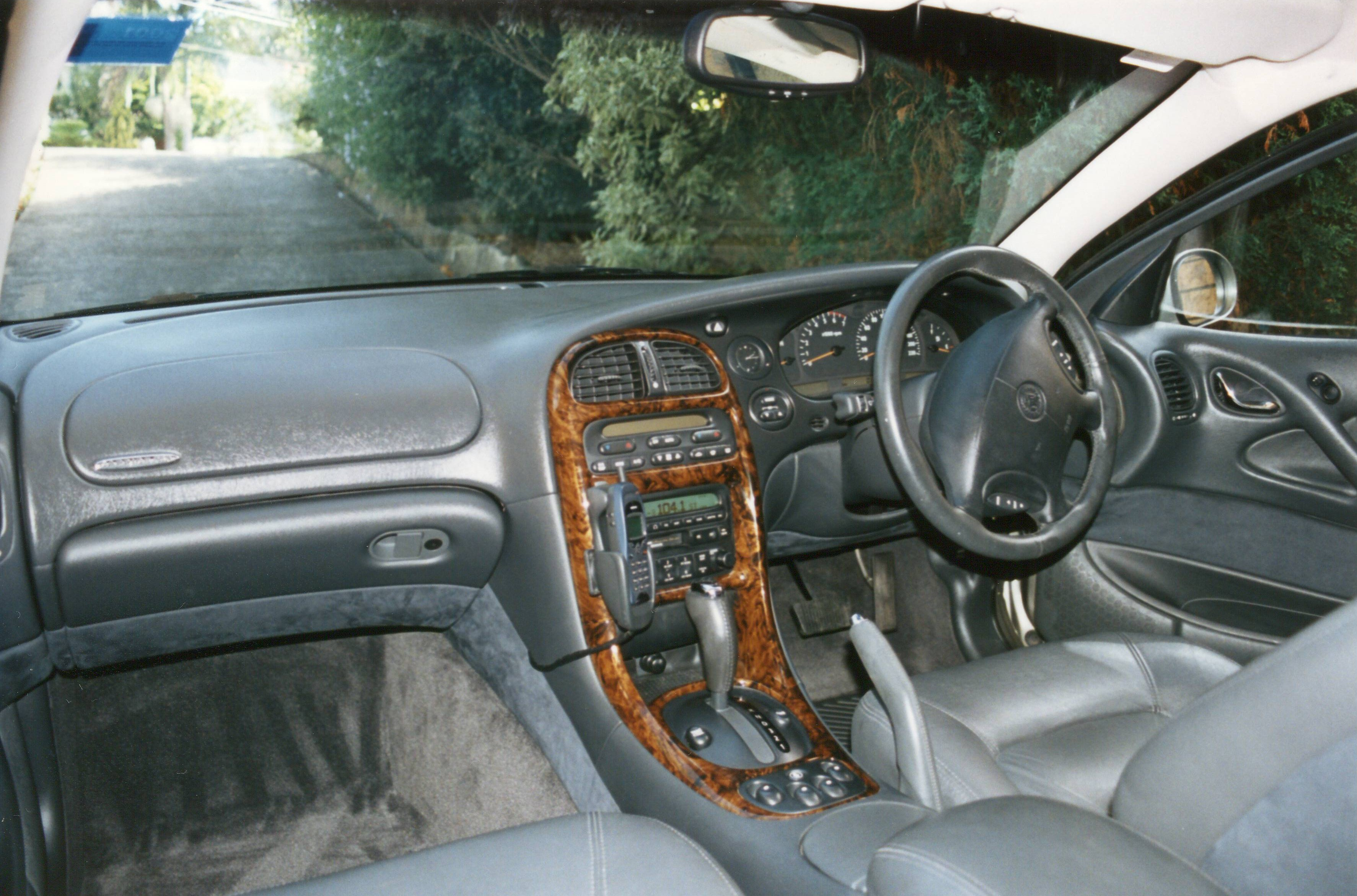
1999–2000 Holden Caprice (WH)

Compared to the previous model, stability improved through the use of wider tracks, a longer wheelbase and four-channel ABS disc brakes with traction control. Usable boot space increased to 541 litres. Cornering lights were provided integrated into the front fog light assembly- these cornering lights were illuminated whenever the indicator was operating on that side of the car, illuminating a turning path for the driver. An electrochromatic rear view mirror sensed headlight glare from vehicles travelling behind, and automatically adjusts mirror glass tint level to reduce driver glare.

Dual zone climate control was a standard feature across the WH range, as was 12-mode trip computer integrated into the instrument cluster. Caprice including rear roof mounted climate control and stereo controls for rear passengers- rear passengers were also provided with two headphone jacks in the rear parcel shelf and could listen to a different audio source to the front occupants. A rear flip down table was incorporated into the rear armrest, complete with storage pocket and cup holders. The exclusive-to-Caprice options included standard Howe leather seats, 260-watt 12-speaker DSP audio system, individual ignition key memory (not available in Statesman- stereo settings, seating position) for three drivers, upright Holden crest logo on the bonnet, chrome exterior door handles, as well as heated side view mirrors and auto dipping passenger side view mirror to avoid alloy wheel damage when reversing. Headlights could be set to automatically sense low light levels and turn on without driver input. Caprice featured a fine chrome vertical bar grille, while Statesman used a chrome matrix style front grille design, and lacked chrome exterior door handles.

HSV branded special order options included electric tilt and slide glass sunroof, VDO MS5000 satellite navigation system in place of front console ashtray, HSV alloy pedals, limited slip differential, rear deck spoiler and choice of two 17-inch alloy wheel styles. Vehicles specially ordered with any HSV optional extras received a Holden-by-Design individually numbered build plate in the engine bay.

The use of self-levelling rear air suspension available in Caprice brought advantages when hauling heavy loads and improved vehicle dynamics when towing. Safety in the WH model was also enhanced, with the addition of side impact head & torso airbags and pyrotechnic seat belt pretensioners along with drivers steering wheel and passenger dashboard airbags all as standard. If the seat belt pretensioners trigger, the doors automatically unlock, both engine and fuel pump shut down and all interior lights will switch on. Also new to the WH are the electric wing mirrors, which when reversing, the passenger mirror faces downwards to assist the driver when parking, thus preventing kerbside wheel damage.

Released in June 1999, the HSV Grange (WH) received modifications to the Statesman's specification (Statesman VINs begin with "6H8WHY", whereas the VIN of a Caprice is "6H8WHZ"; the Grange shares the "Y" digit in its VIN with Statesman). Again, the Grange was finished by HSV in Clayton, Victoria. It was available with the 3.8-litre supercharged V6 and 5.7-litre V8 engines. The WH Grange had HSV's "Prestige" suspension tune, specially developed Monroe Sensatrac shock absorbers, a front anti-roll bar, a rear anti-roll bar and a self-levelling function for the rear suspension (shared with Caprice). Standard features for the WH Grange included 18-inch ten-spoke alloy wheels, a 260-watt sound system with ten speakers and a six-disc CD changer, climate control air conditioning, eight-way power adjustable front seats, leather upholstery, cruise control, front fog lights, leather-wrapped steering wheel with audio controls, remote central locking, power windows and mirrors, a height and reach adjustable steering wheel, driver seat and mirror memory settings, an electrochromatic rear view mirror, trip computer and an immobiliser. The Grange was also fitted with a limited slip rear differential as well as a choice of two higher performance brake packages, increased diameter front and rear swaybars and an exclusive-to-Grange HSV body kit consisting of front bumper with enlarged cooling intake, unique stainless steel meshed intake grille with HSV logo in the centre, flared deep side skirts, deep skirted three-piece rear bumper, rear decklid spoiler and rear HSV badging.

=== WK ===
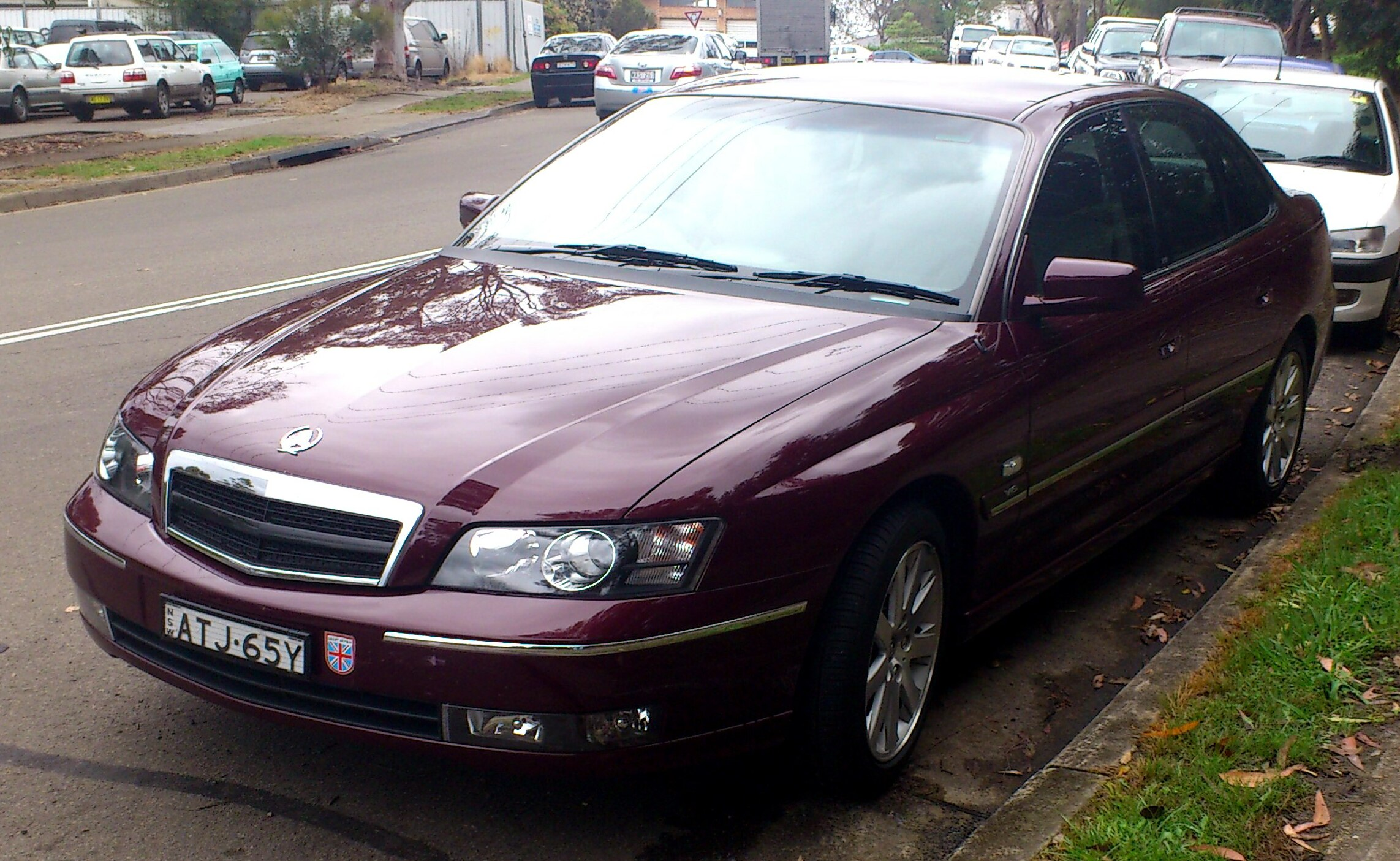
2003–2004 Holden Caprice (WK)

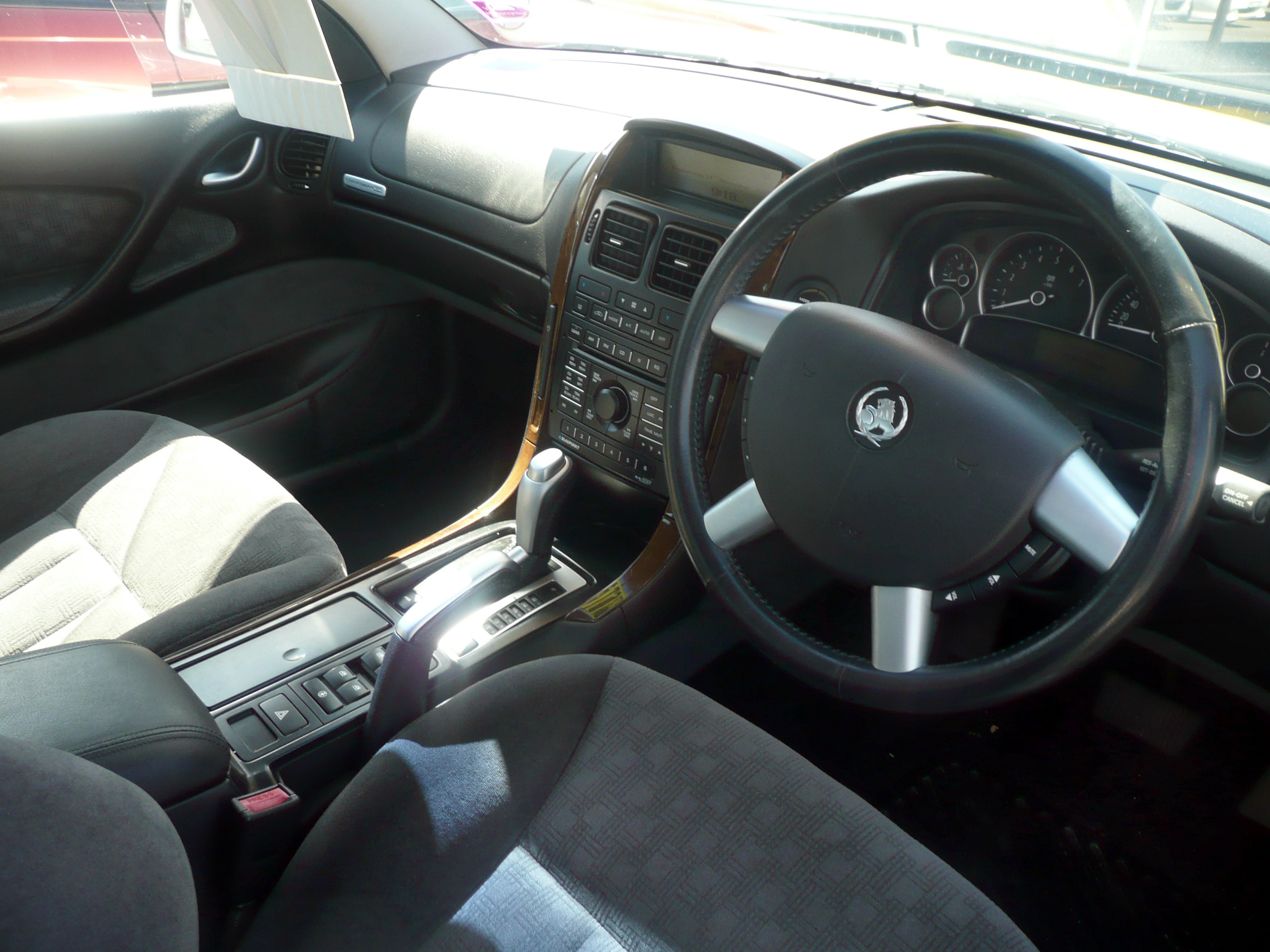
Interior (WK Statesman)

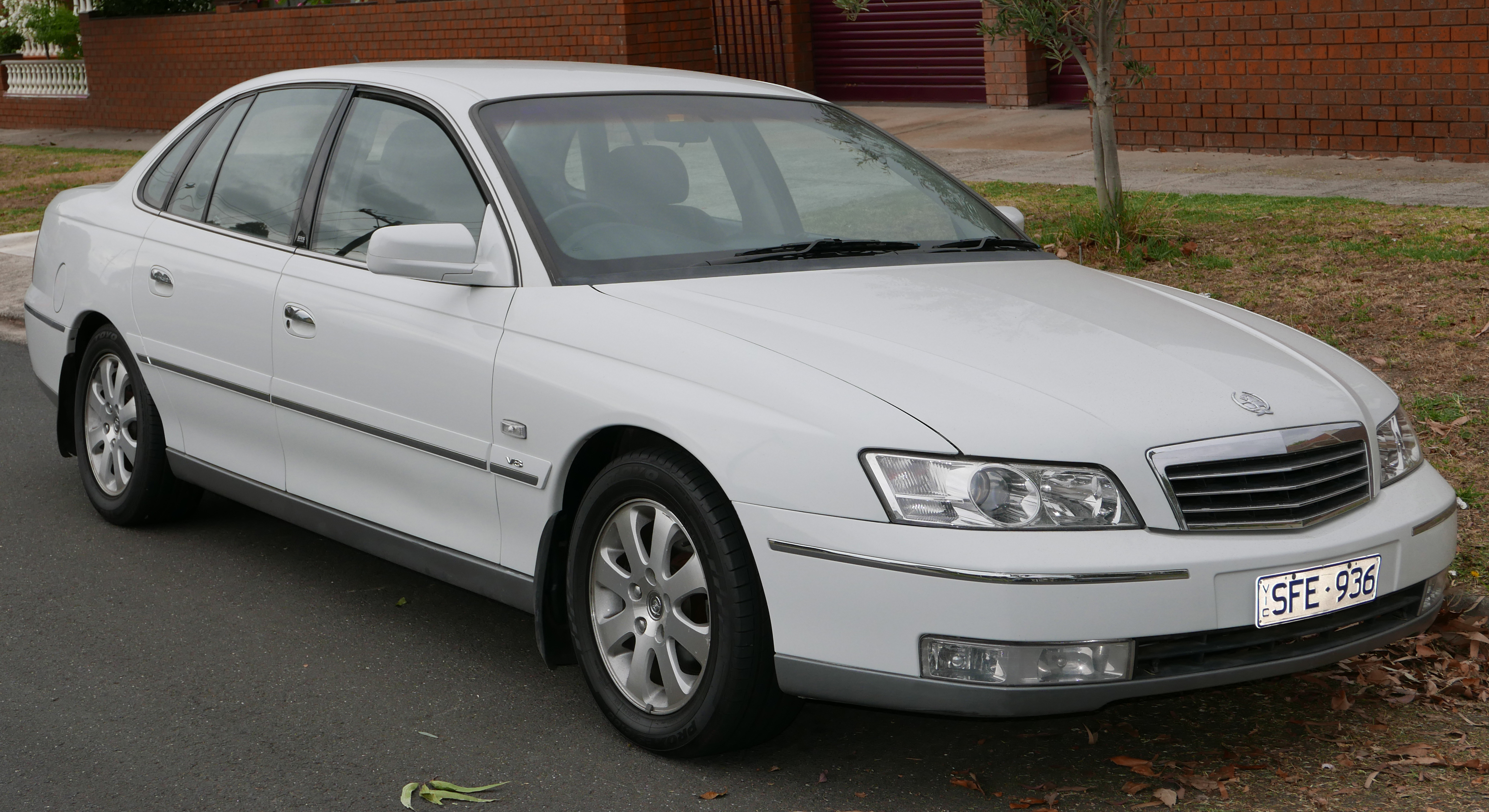

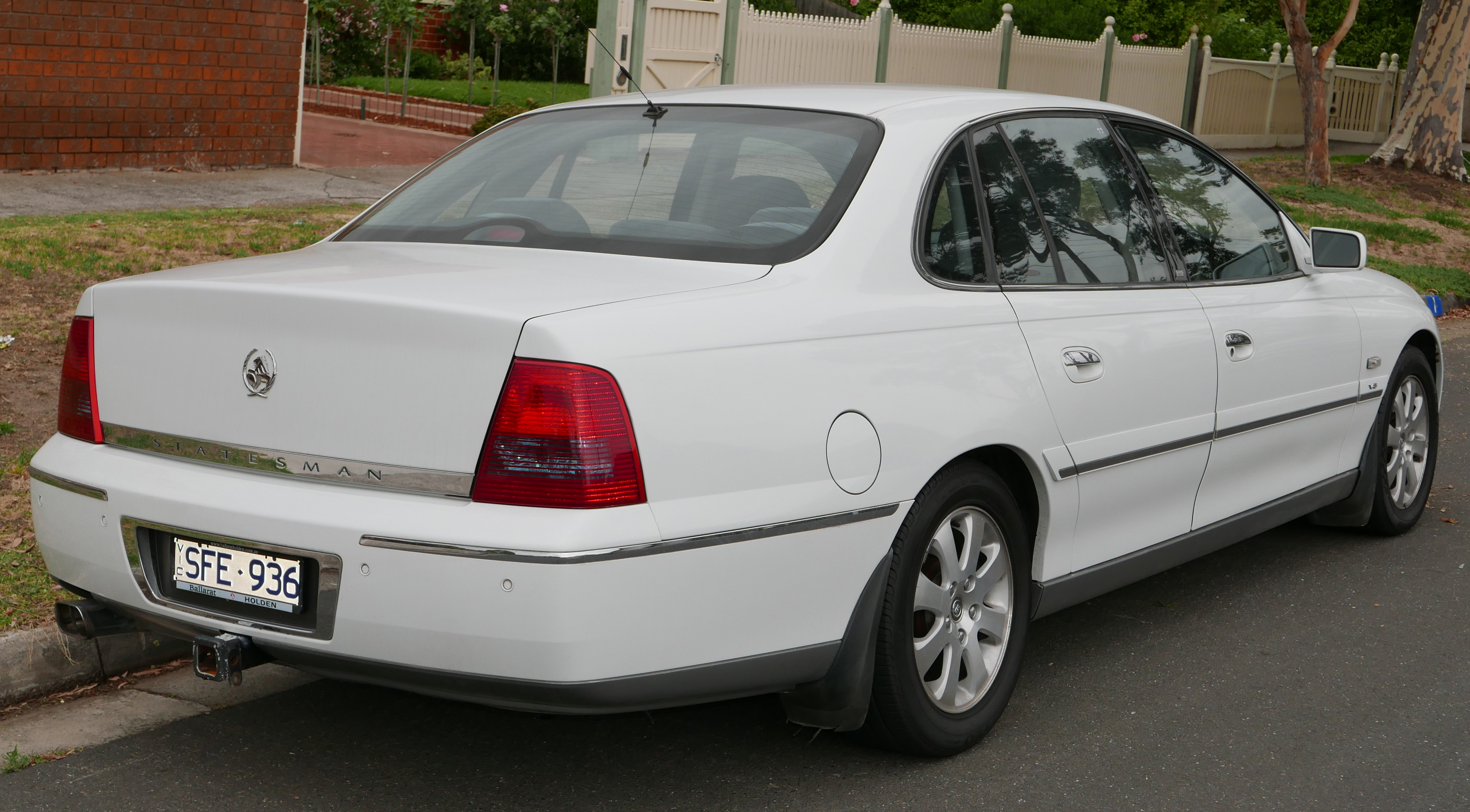
2003–2004 Holden Statesman (WK)

A revised WK series based on the VY Commodore series was launched in May 2003. The curvaceous front and rear end styling of the WH was abandoned in favour of angular lines, starting with the headlights borrowed from the VY Calais. From the rear, the redesigned taillights were now separated by sheet metal, rather than being joined with a horizontal strip of plastic. The redesign had the after effect of lowering the WK's drag coefficient to 0.30. Other changes came in the form of revised bumpers, wheel trims, with the interior dashboard and centre console receiving a major overhaul. Powertrains carried over from the previous model, but the Generation III V8 engine was now rated at 235 kW (315 hp) for the Statesman and 245 kW (329 hp) for the Caprice. Other engineering changes were made to the structural integrity of the car. The reinforced front flooring and sills gives the upshot of a 70 percent reduction in lower limb injuries in offset frontal crash tests at 60 km/h (37 mph).

Feature wise, the Statesman now offered standard rear parking sensors and optional satellite navigation, with the Caprice receiving a dual screen DVD entertainment system for the rear passengers. The Used Car Safety Ratings found that WH/WK Statesmans provide a "significantly better than average" level of occupant protection in the event of an accident.

Standard features for the HSV Grange (WK) included 18-inch alloy wheels, a twelve speaker Blaupunkt sound system with a 430-watt amplifier, subwoofer and a six-stack CD player, dual-zone climate control air conditioning, leather seats and trim, eight-way power adjustable front seats, cruise control with speed alert, driver's seat and mirror memory settings, DVD player with twin seven-inch rear seat LCD screens and remote control, rear parking sensors, a leather-wrapped multi-function steering wheel, remote central locking, power windows and mirrors, a height and reach adjustable steering wheel, an electrochromatic rear view mirror, trip computer, cargo net and an immobiliser. As standard, the Grange was also fitted with a limited slip rear differential, larger front & rear sway bars, larger performance brakes and an HSV exclusive-to-Grange body kit consisting of front bumper, side skirts, rear bumper and deck lid spoiler.

=== WL ===
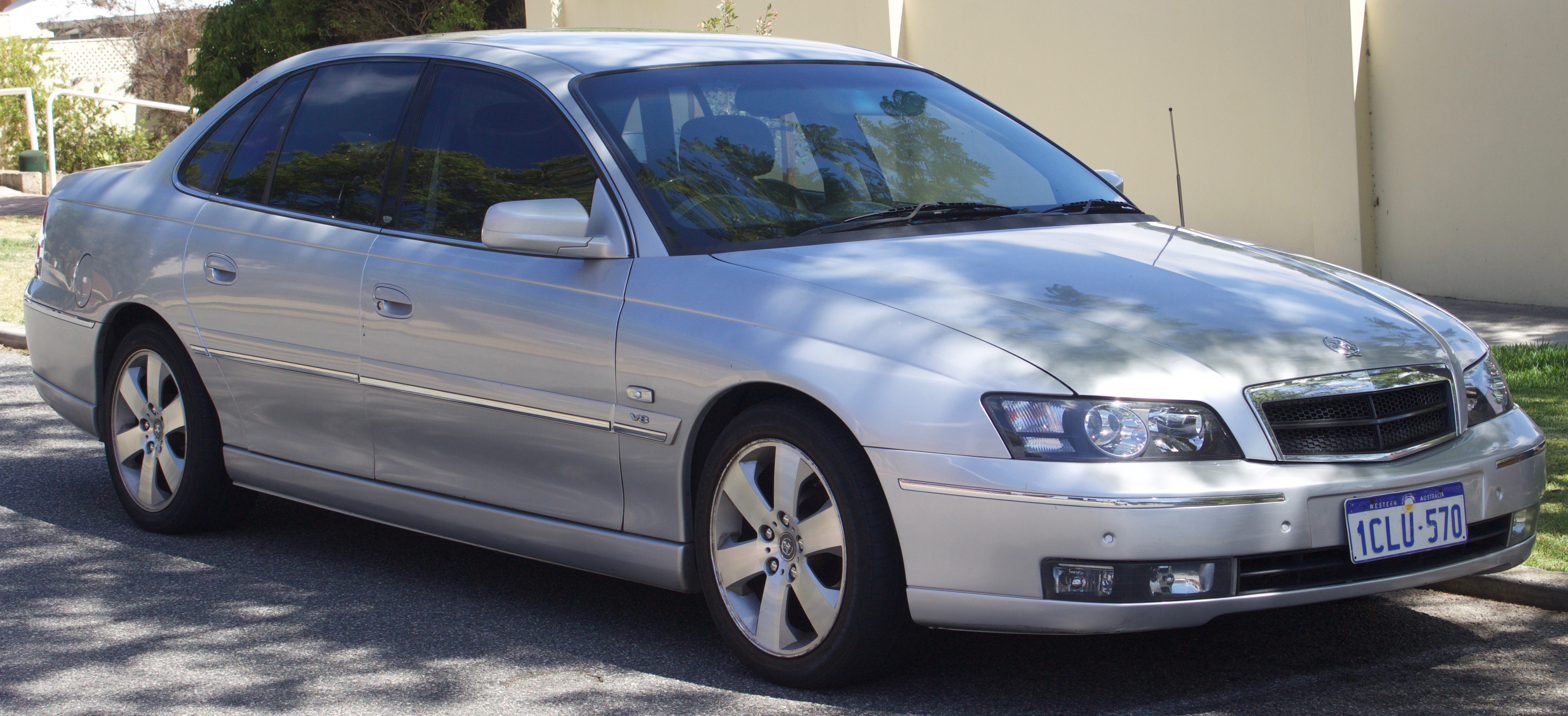

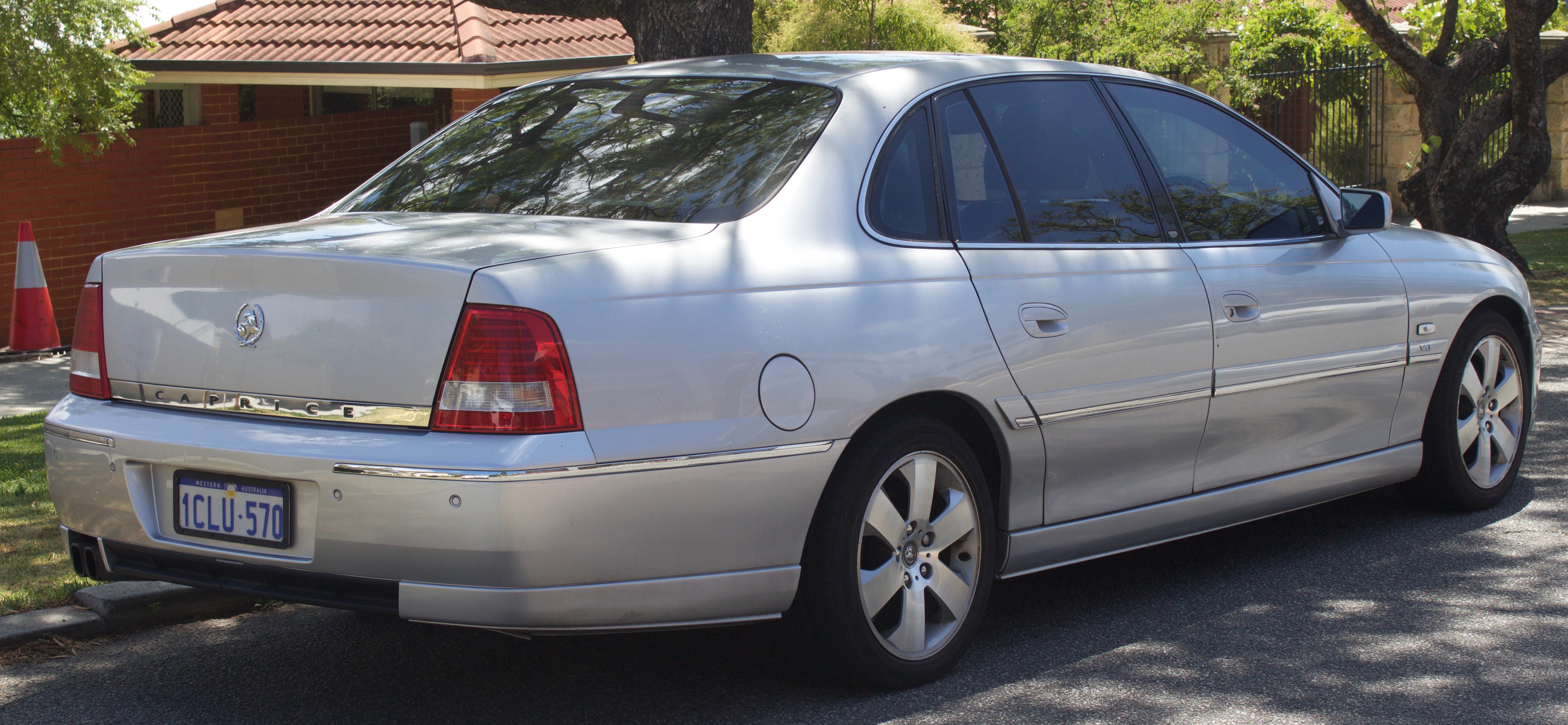
2004–2006 Holden Caprice (WL)

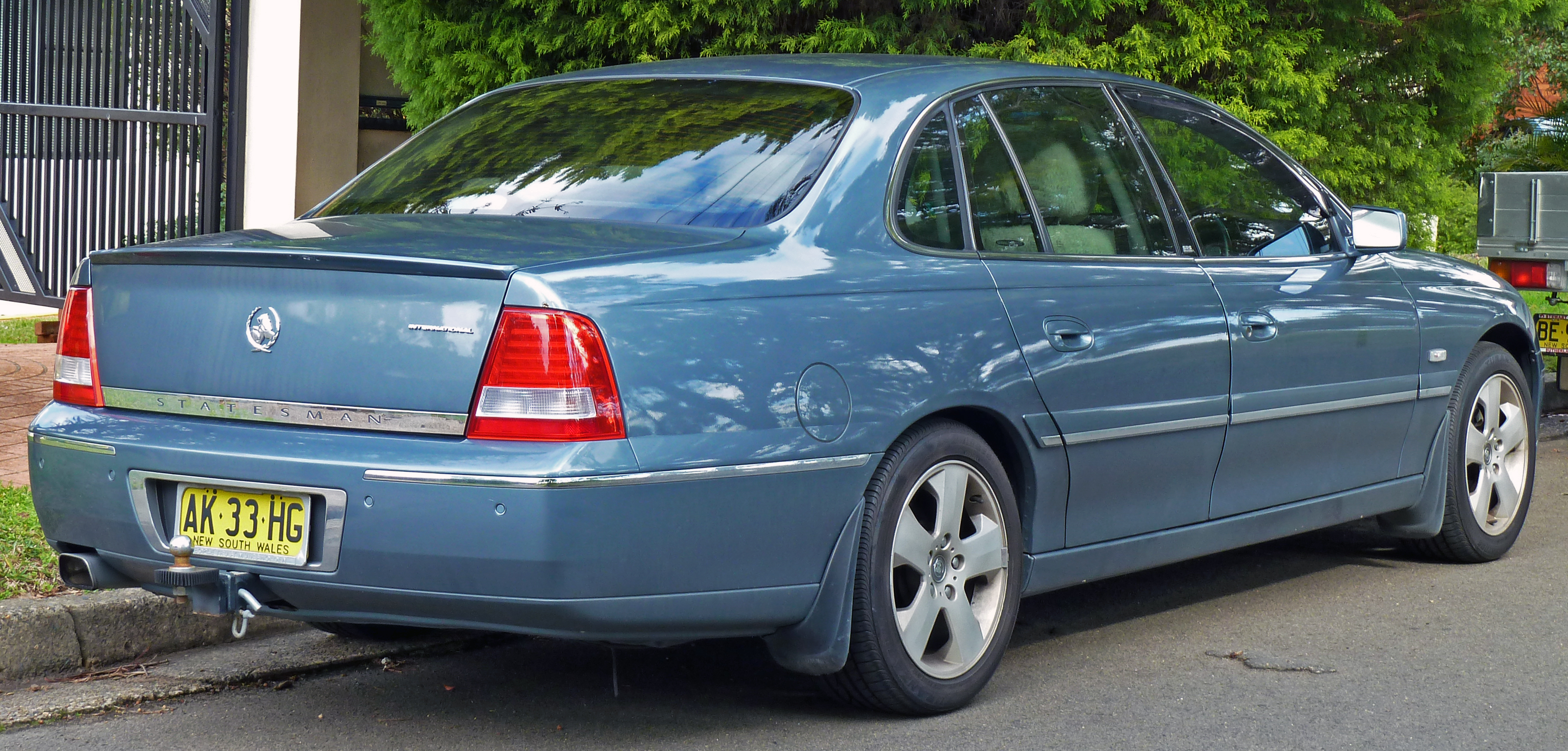
2005–2006 Holden Statesman International (WL)

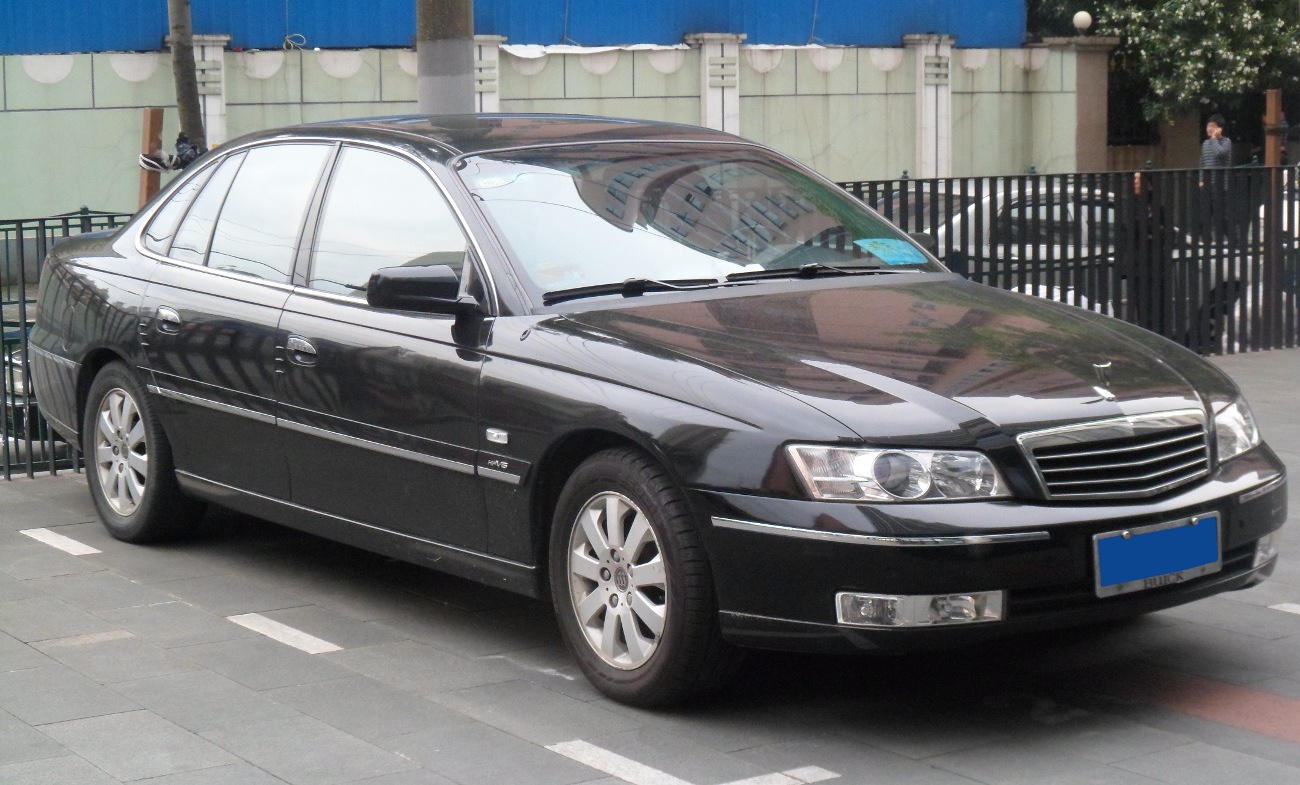
2005–2007 Buick Royaum (China)

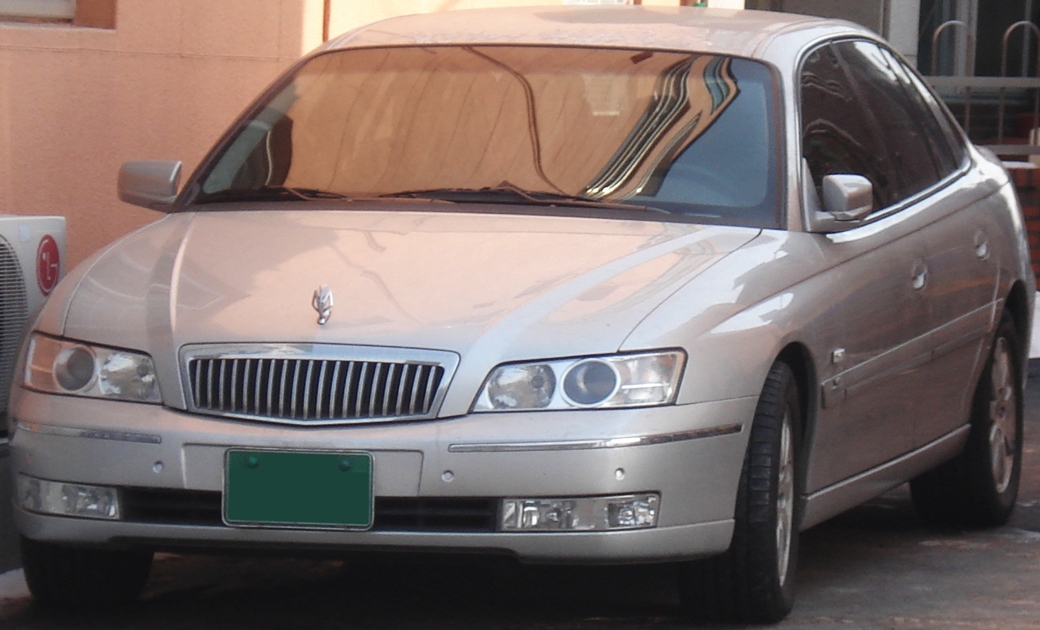
2005–2007 Daewoo Statesman (South Korea)

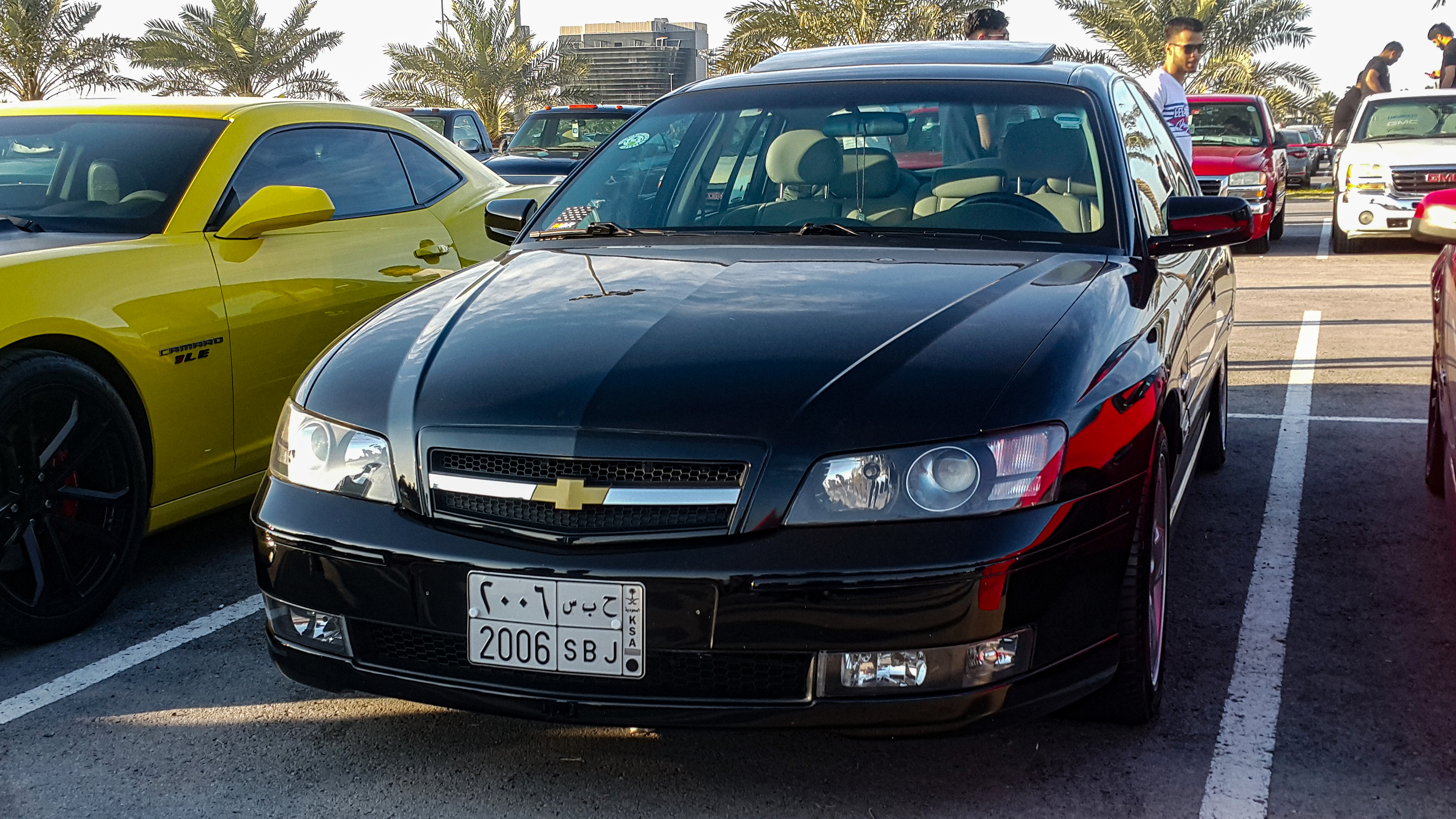
2005–2007 Chevrolet Caprice SS (Middle East)

Released in August 2004, the VZ Commodore based WL series brought with it an all-new 3.6-litre Alloytec V6 engine, succeeding the WK's Ecotec unit. Power and torque figures were rated at 190 kW (255 hp) and 340 N⋅m (251 lb⋅ft), respectively. The Statesman's optional V8 was the 245 kW (329 hp) version from the WK Caprice, with the WL Caprice's engine obtaining a further 5 kW (6.7 hp). The V8s received a stronger GM 4L65-E automatic transmission, while the Alloytec V6 versions received a new five-speed GM 5L40-E automatic. Several new safety features were added to the WL line-up. Such include brake assist, electronic brakeforce distribution, Electronic Stability Program and LED tail lamps. The new LED lamps give an additional 5 metres (16 ft) of warning to trailing motorists travelling at 110 km/h (68 mph) because they illuminate in 60 nanoseconds, compared to 1,000 for conventional incandescent light bulbs.

In 2005, General Motors began exporting the Statesman to China, where it was badged as the Buick Royaum and sold through the GM-SAIC Network. The Royaum was initially equipped with the 3.6-litre Alloytec engine fitted to the Statesman, however the 155 kW (208 hp) 2.8-litre LP1 engine followed later in the year. Both engines were paired to a 5 speed automatic gearbox. Trims levels were known as 2.8 GL Deluxe, 2.8 GL Comfort and 3.6 GS Deluxe. The 3.6 trim level was changed to 3.6 Luxury Sports for 2005 and was priced at CN¥498,000 (US$74,190). The Royaum was not a sales success, tallying 2,008 sales in 2005 and 3,631 sales in 2006-07. Production ended in early 2007 and was replaced by the new VE Holden Commodore based WM/WN Caprice Statesman-based Buick Park Avenue assembled in Shanghai by GM Shanghai.

An additional export programme to South Korea was announced on 12 April 2005 under the Daewoo Statesman name. During 2005, Holden exported almost 2,000 units of the Daewoo to South Korea. With an identical powertrain to the Buick, the South Korean export model was sold through the GM Daewoo network.

Standard features for the WL series HSV Grange included 19-inch alloy wheels, a 430-watt Blaupunkt sound system with twelve speakers and a six-stack CD player, dual-zone climate control air conditioning, Nappa leather seats, eight-way power adjustable front seats, driver's seat and mirror memory settings, cruise control with speed alert, front fog lamps, a front and rear parking sensors, DVD player with twin seven-inch rear seat LCD screens and remote control, leather-wrapped multi-function steering wheel, remote central locking, power windows and heated mirrors, automatically dipping mirrors when reversing, a height and reach adjustable steering wheel, an electrochromatic rear vision mirror, tyre pressure sensors, a trip computer and an immobiliser. As standard, the Grange was also fitted with a limited slip rear differential as well as larger diameter front and rear sway bars, performance brakes and an exclusive body kit consisting of more aggressive front bumper, side skirts, rear bumper and deck lid spoiler.

== Third generation (2006–2017) ==
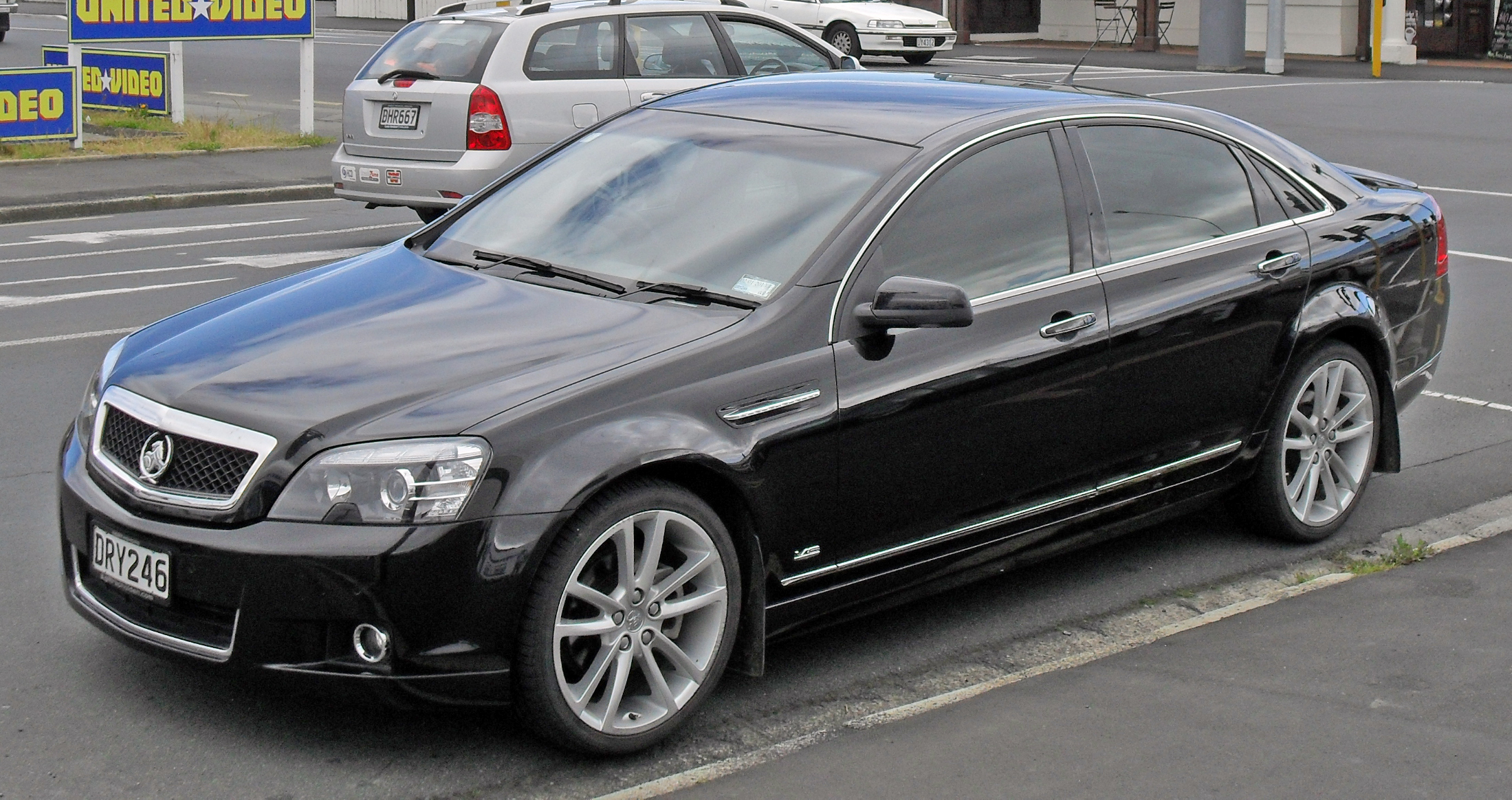

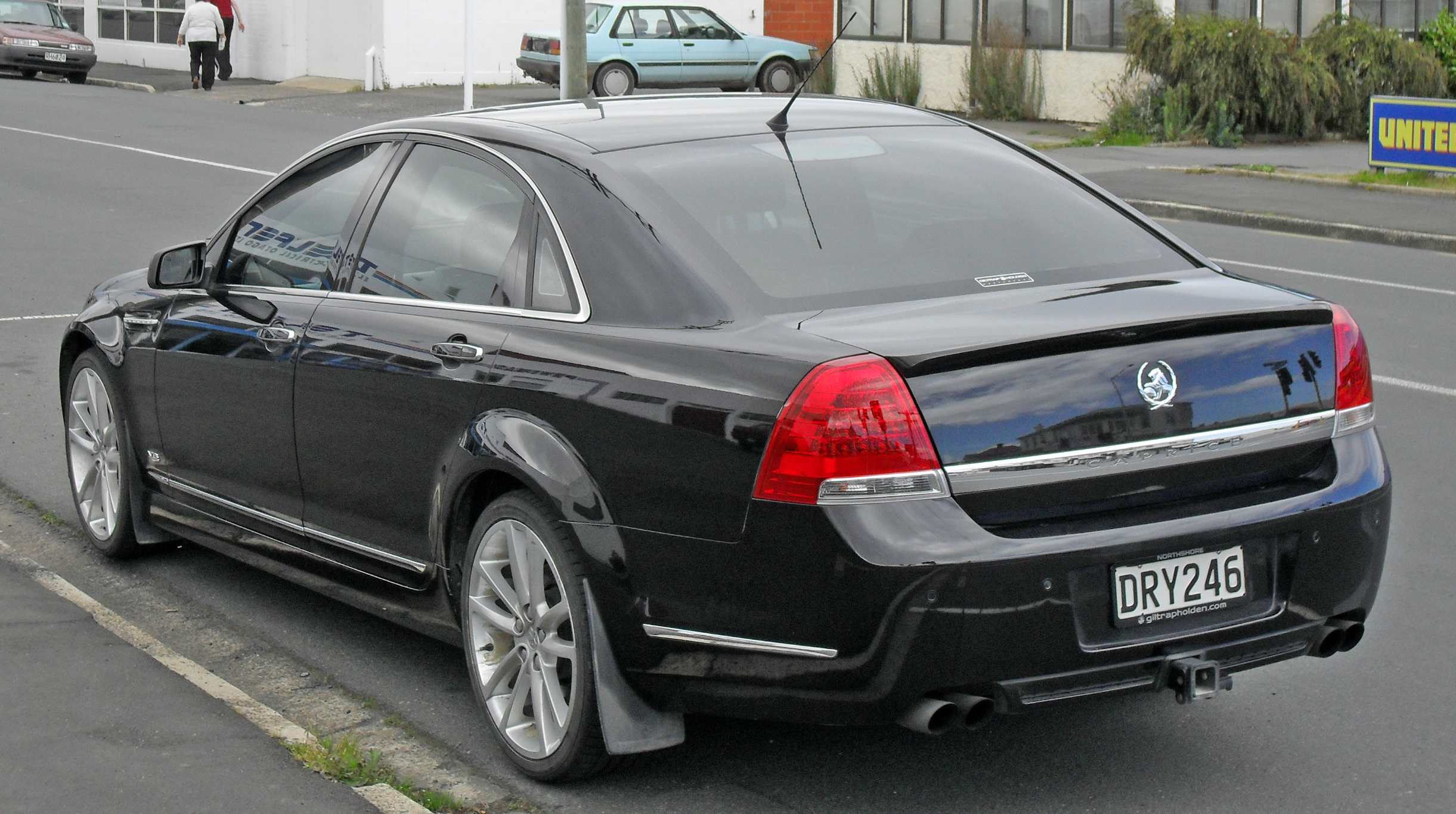
Holden Caprice (WM)

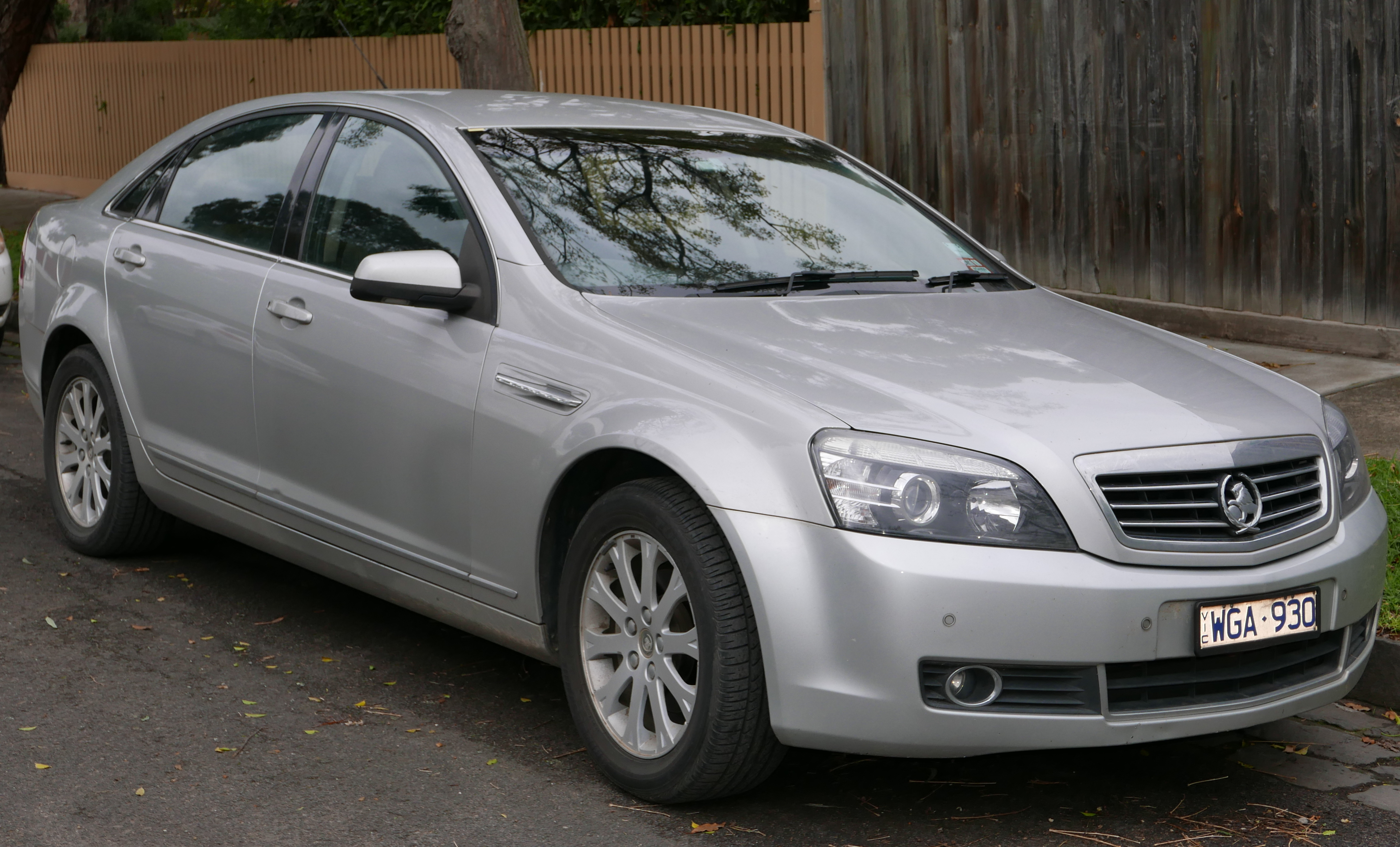

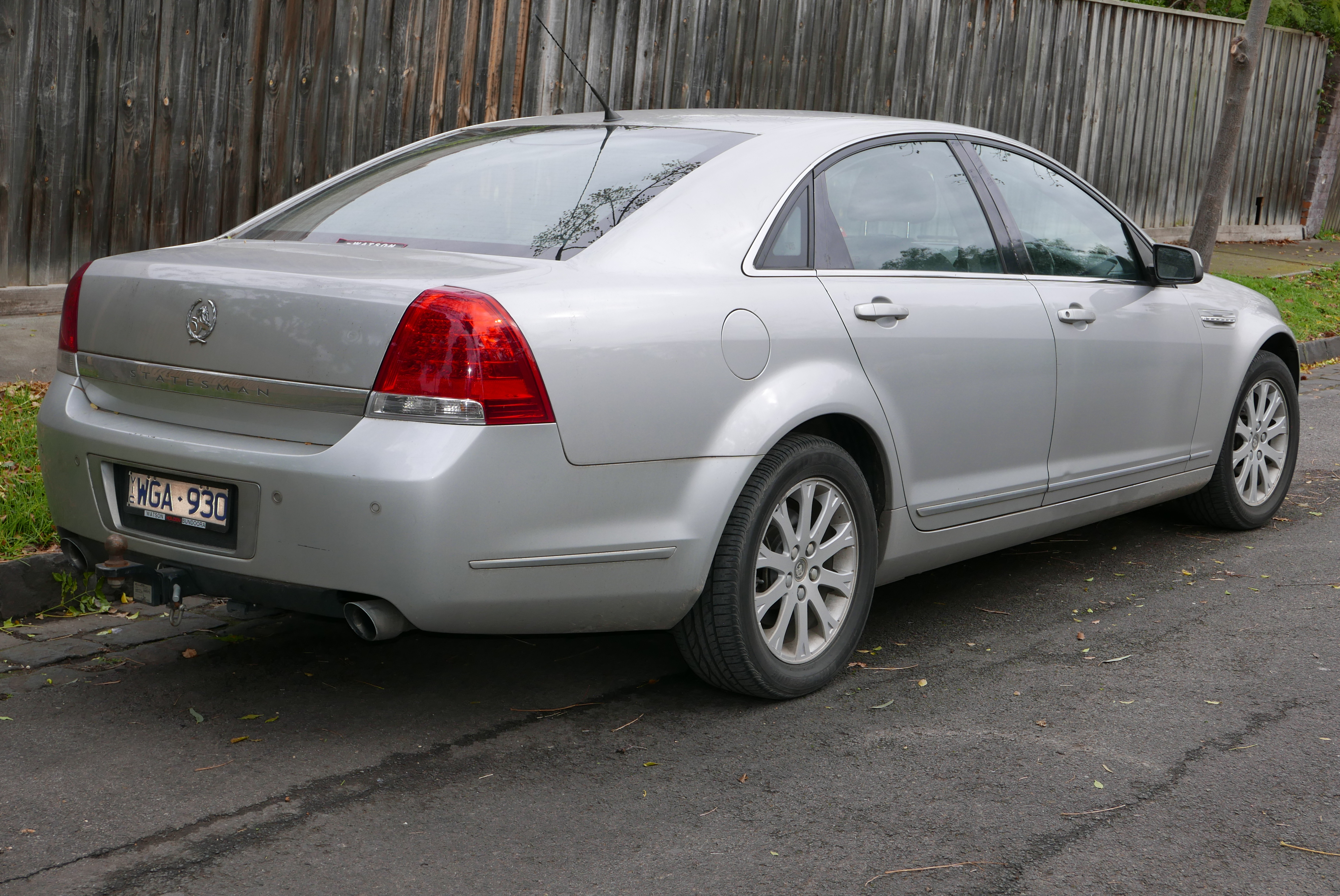
Holden Statesman (WM)

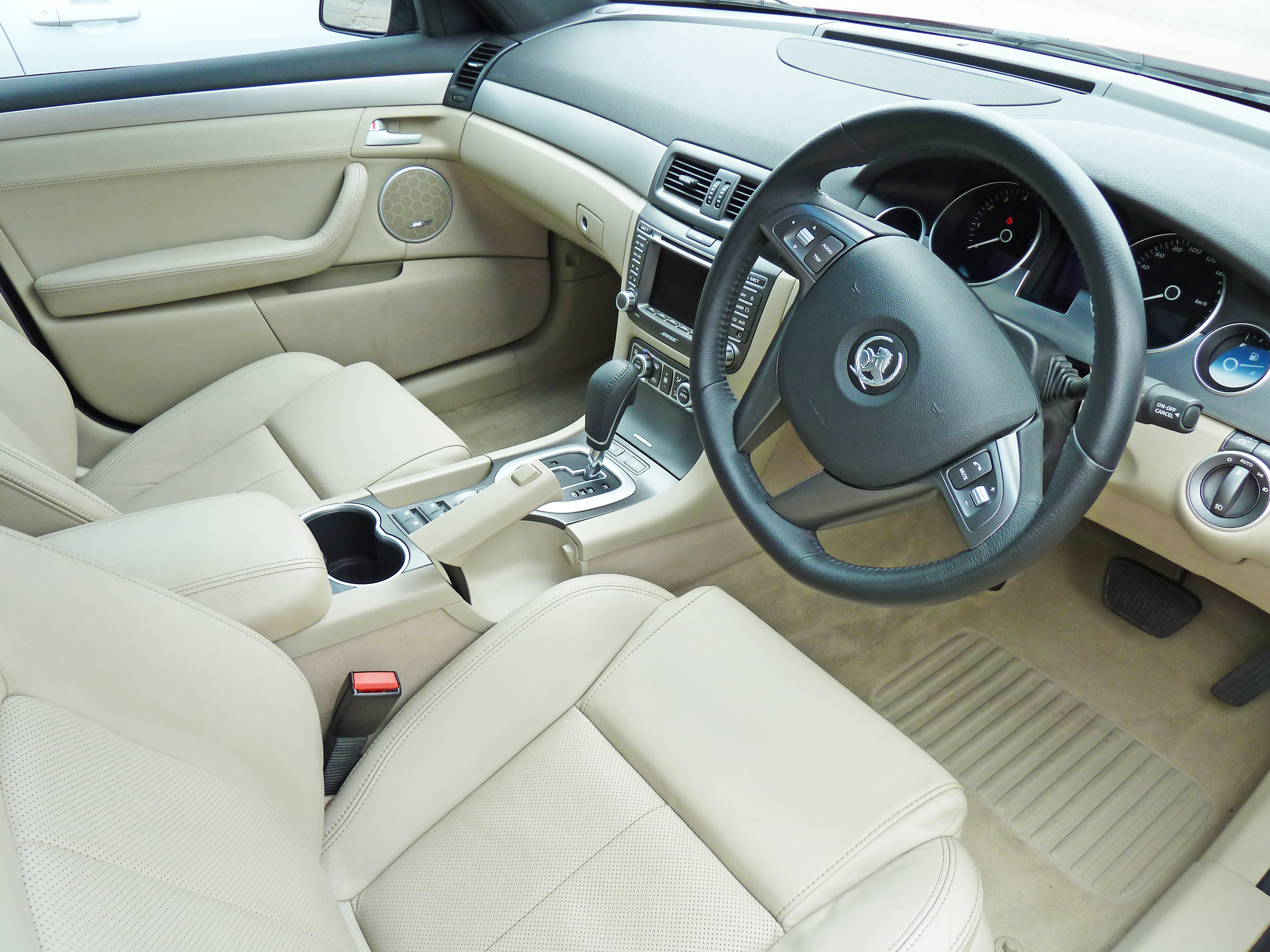

=== WM ===
The third generation WM was launched alongside the VE Commodore on 16 July 2006 at the Melbourne Convention & Exhibition Centre. With the Statesman's export plans, it was decided that its launch should be simultaneous with that of the Commodore, rather than months later, as had been the convention. The WM development programme reportedly cost General Motors A$190 million with another $1.04 billion devoted to the VE Commodore model which the Statesman is based upon. The WM series utilises the GM Zeta platform developed by Holden. Unlike previous models, the WM no longer shares its architecture with an Opel sedan, and has rear doors different from those found on the Commodore. Previously, it had to share the doors, or at least the lower parts, with the lesser Commodore. This is just one of the ways Holden has tried to create greater differentiation between the Statesman and the Commodore on which it is based.

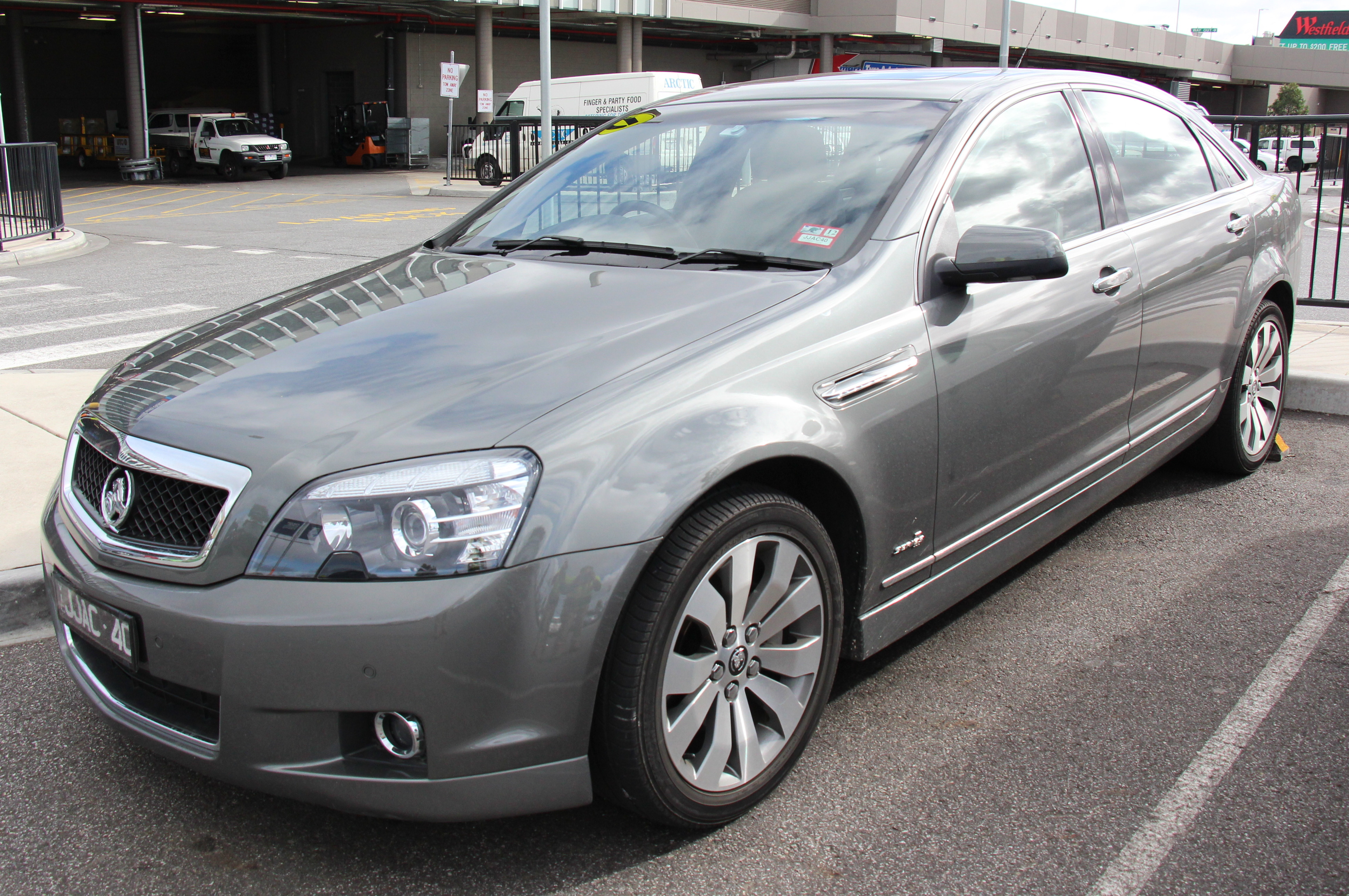

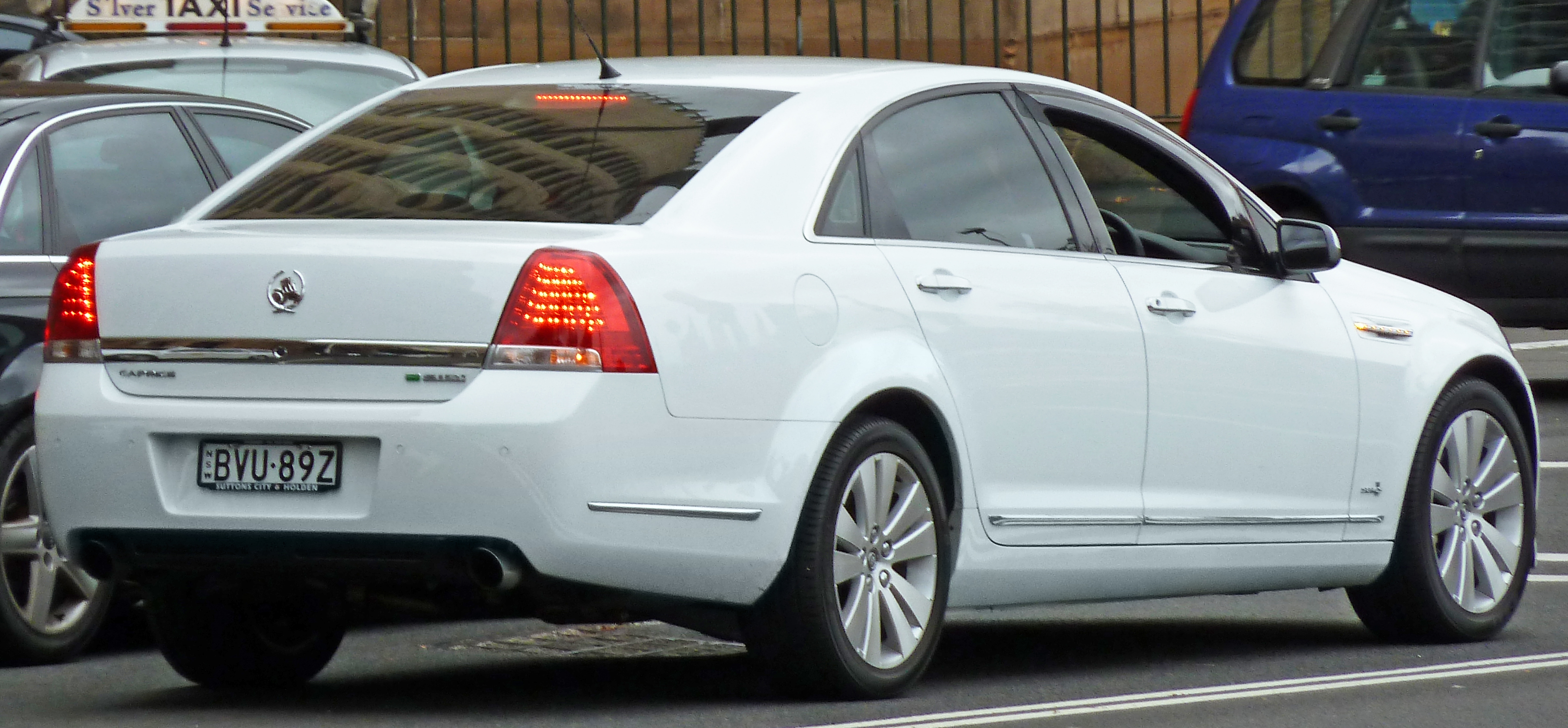
Holden Caprice (WM II)

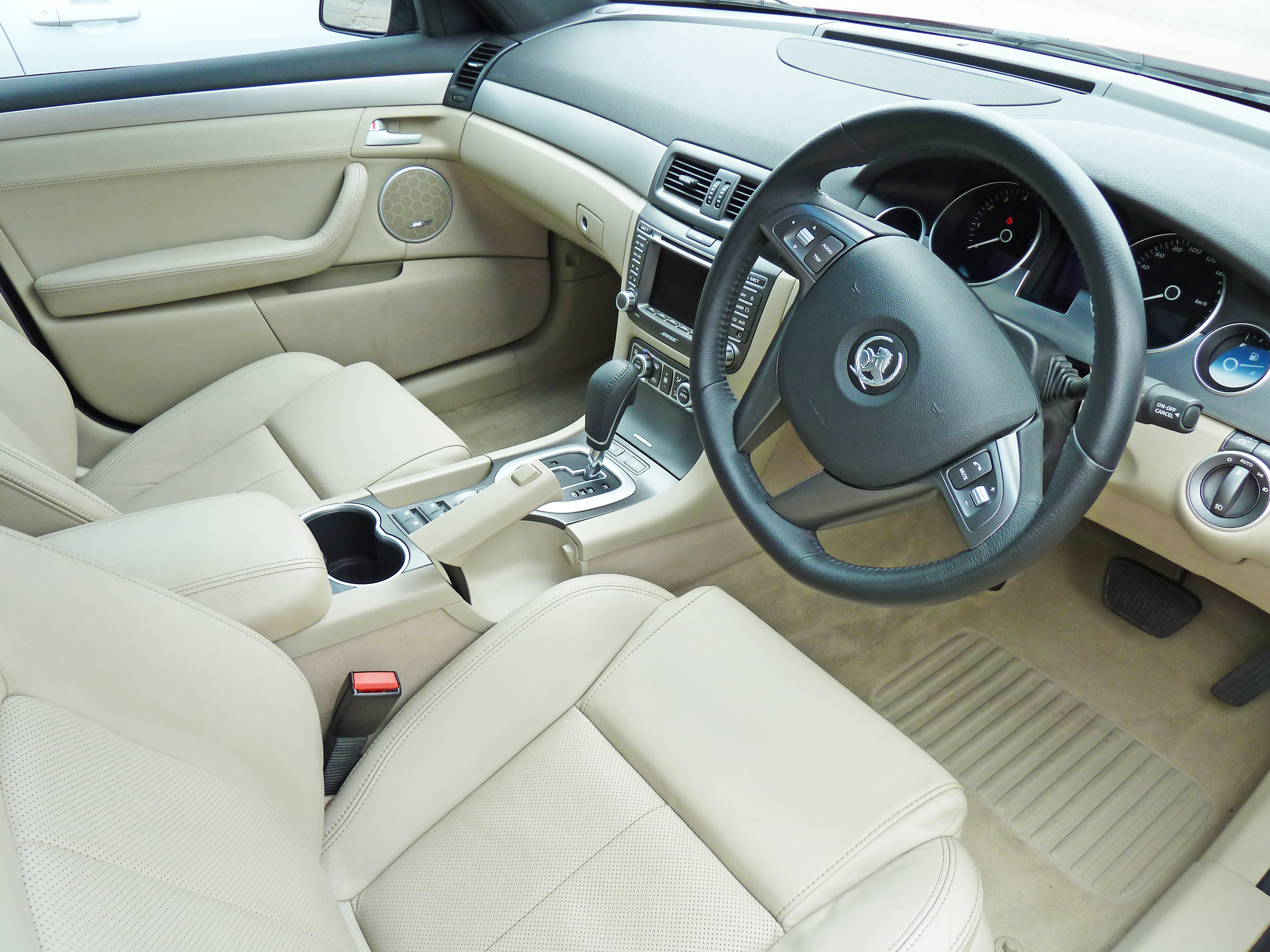
Interior (WM Caprice)

Like the second generation model, the WM is exported to the Middle East as the Chevrolet Caprice. In China, the sister model had been produced as the Buick Park Avenue from 2007, mainly using locally sourced parts and sharing some globally sourced parts. The Park Avenue was discontinued in 2012.

In 2008, Holden recommenced Caprice exports to South Korea as the Daewoo Veritas after showcasing a pre-production Daewoo L4X in 2007. Compared to the Australian-specification model, the Veritas is V6-powered only and has a modified rear floorpan to accommodate the electrically adjustable rear seats incorporating a massage function. The head restraints are also electrically adjustable, with the Caprice's dual headrest-mounted LCD screens orphaned in favour of a single, ceiling-mounted unit. GM Daewoo announced an updated Veritas on 31 March 2009 to take effect from 1 April. The update, which was yet to be seen in other markets, comprised a revised powertrain combination, featuring a new direct injection version of the 3.6-litre Alloytec engine. This new engine results in a power increase from 185 kW (248 hp) to 204 kW (274 hp) together with more torque and a reduced fuel consumption figure. These efficiency improvements have been enough to satisfy the government of South Korea's "Korea Ultra-Low Emission Vehicle" (KULEV) requirements. In place of the five-speed automatic transmission previously, these revised models ship with a six-speed GM 6L50 unit, featuring Active Select.

The update to the Veritas in South Korea was adopted in the Holden versions for the 2010 model year (MY10). This update was announced on 4 August 2009, and released in September. The now direct-injected 3.6-litre V6, labelled Spark Ignition Direct Injection (SIDI) by Holden, is rated at 210 kW (282 hp) and 350 N⋅m (258 lbf⋅ft) of torque. Gains in efficiency have been achieved via the implementation of direct fuel injection, improvements to the fuel cutout during coasting, the addition of a more efficient alternator and voltage regulator, a 50 rpm lower idle speed (to 550 rpm), and a new "turbine damper" for the automatic transmission that works to suppress vibrations at low rpm, thus enabling earlier upshifts. In 2010 the Veritas was discontinued after GM phased out the Daewoo brand in South Korea in favour of Chevrolet.

In 2010, Holden made the decision to discontinue the Statesman nameplate. To replace this gap in their lineup, Holden reduced the price of the V6 Caprice and removed equipment so it roughly mirrored the equipment levels found in the Statesman. This coincided with the release of the "Series II" versions of the Caprice (non V) which was only available in V6 form and was intended to replace the Statesman in price and equipment, and the introduction of the "Series II" Caprice V which was only available in V8 guise and roughly followed the feature set found in the "Series I" Caprice.

Between 2011 and 2017, a rebadged version of the Holden Caprice was sold in North America as a police cruiser, called the Chevrolet Caprice PPV (Police Patrol Vehicle). It uses the interior and dashboard of the lower-end Commodore Omega, and is marketed as an alternative to the Chevrolet Impala (produced in Oshawa, Ontario, Canada) for heavy-duty fleet use.

=== WN ===
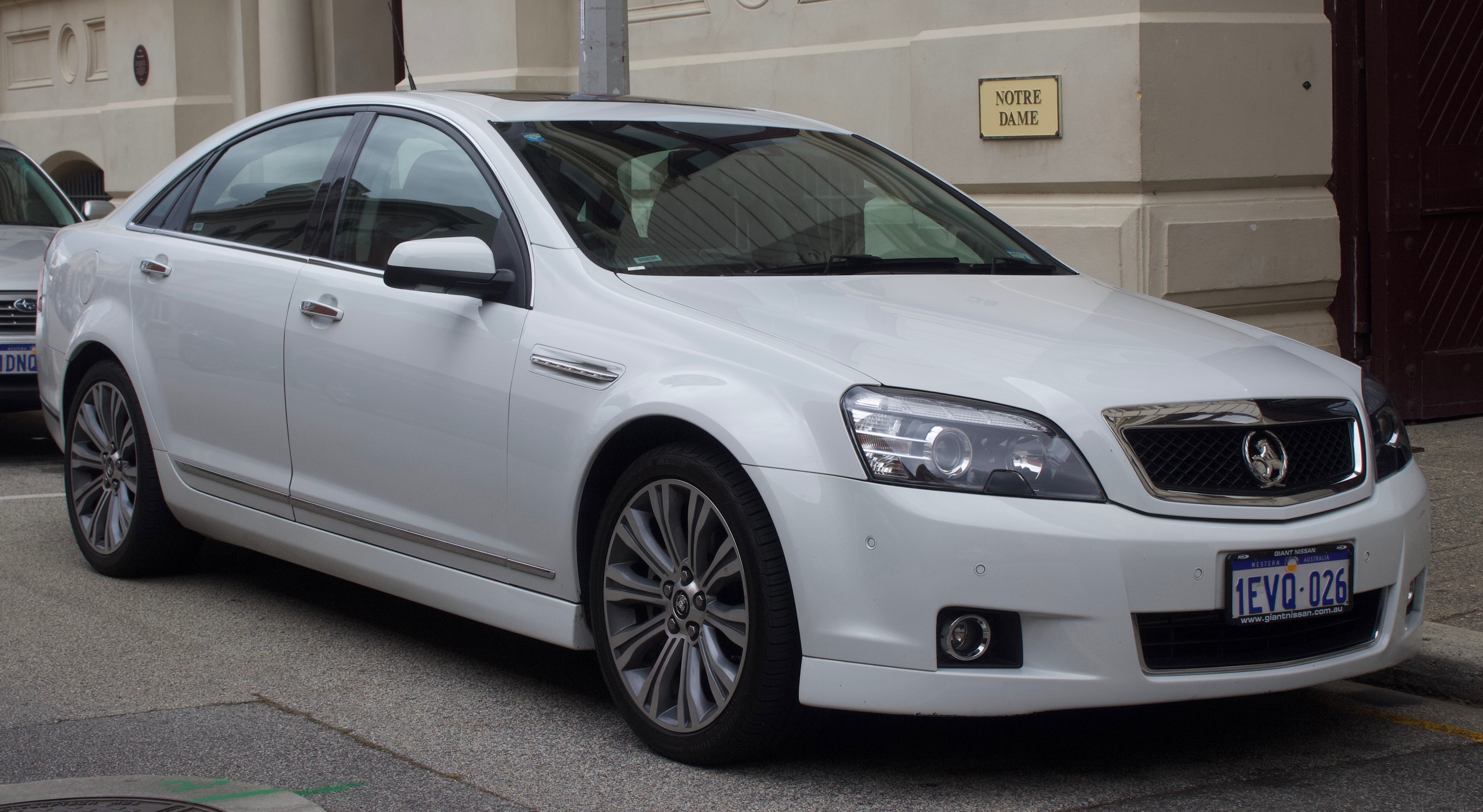
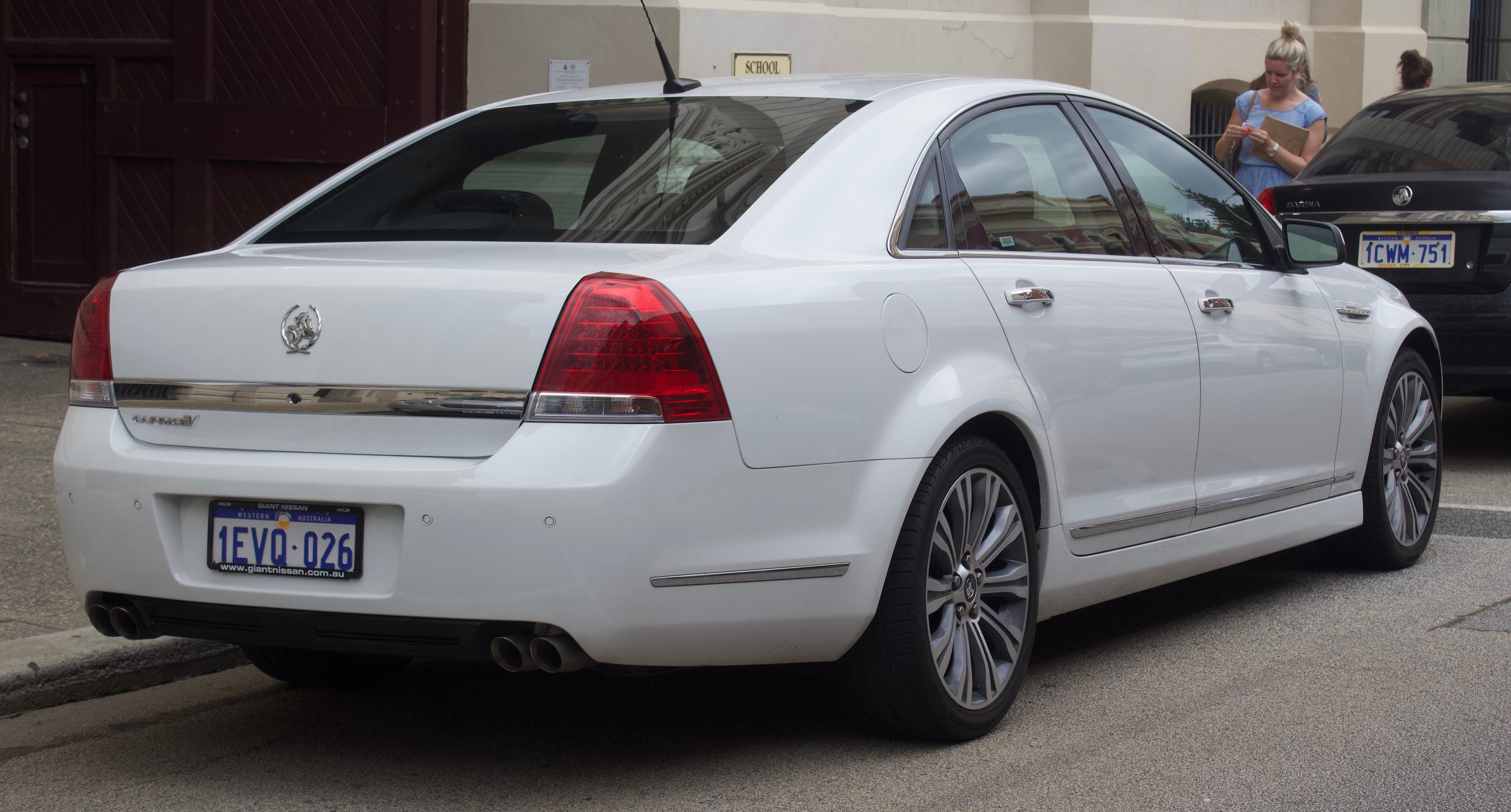
Holden Caprice (WN)
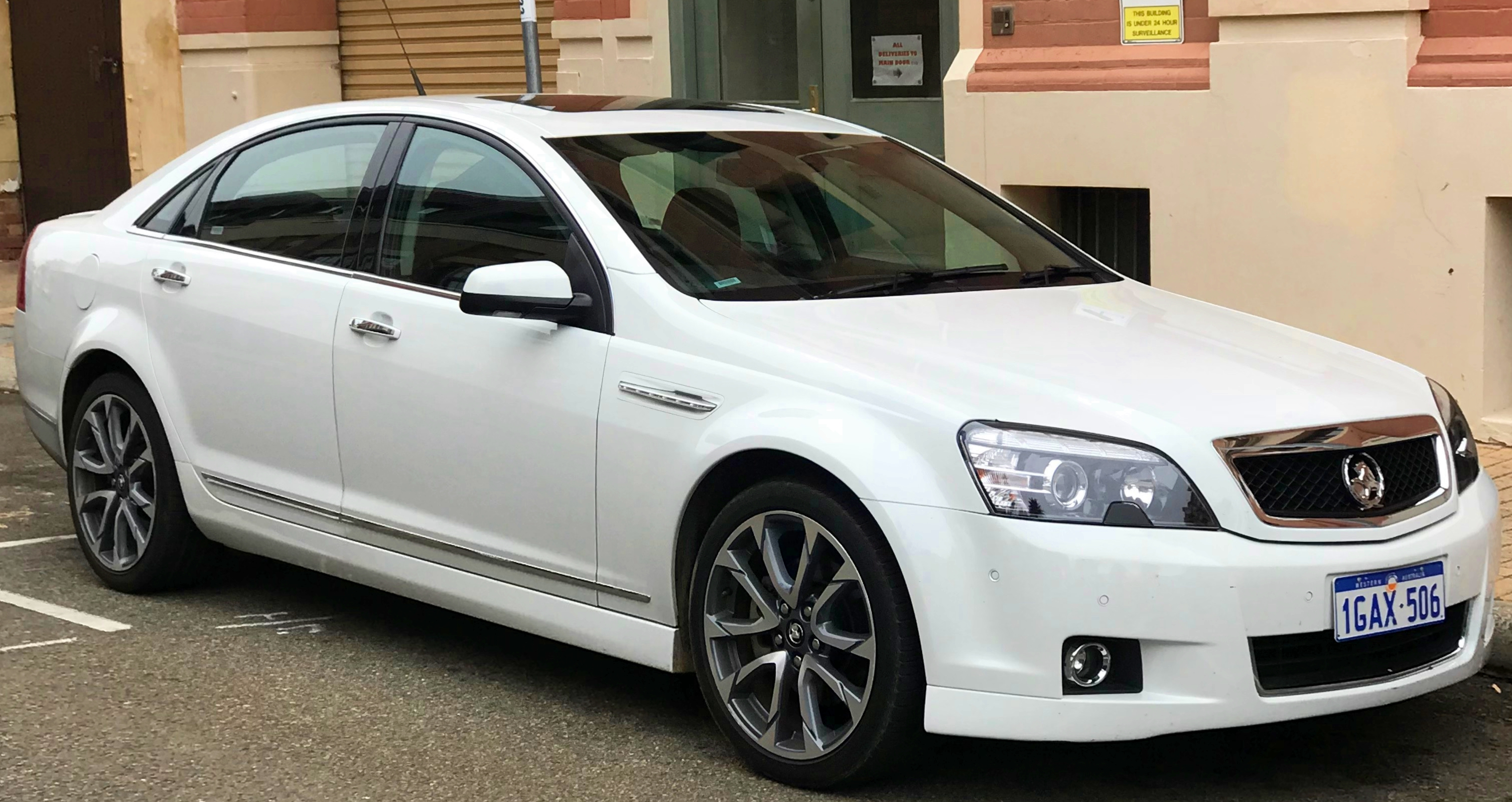
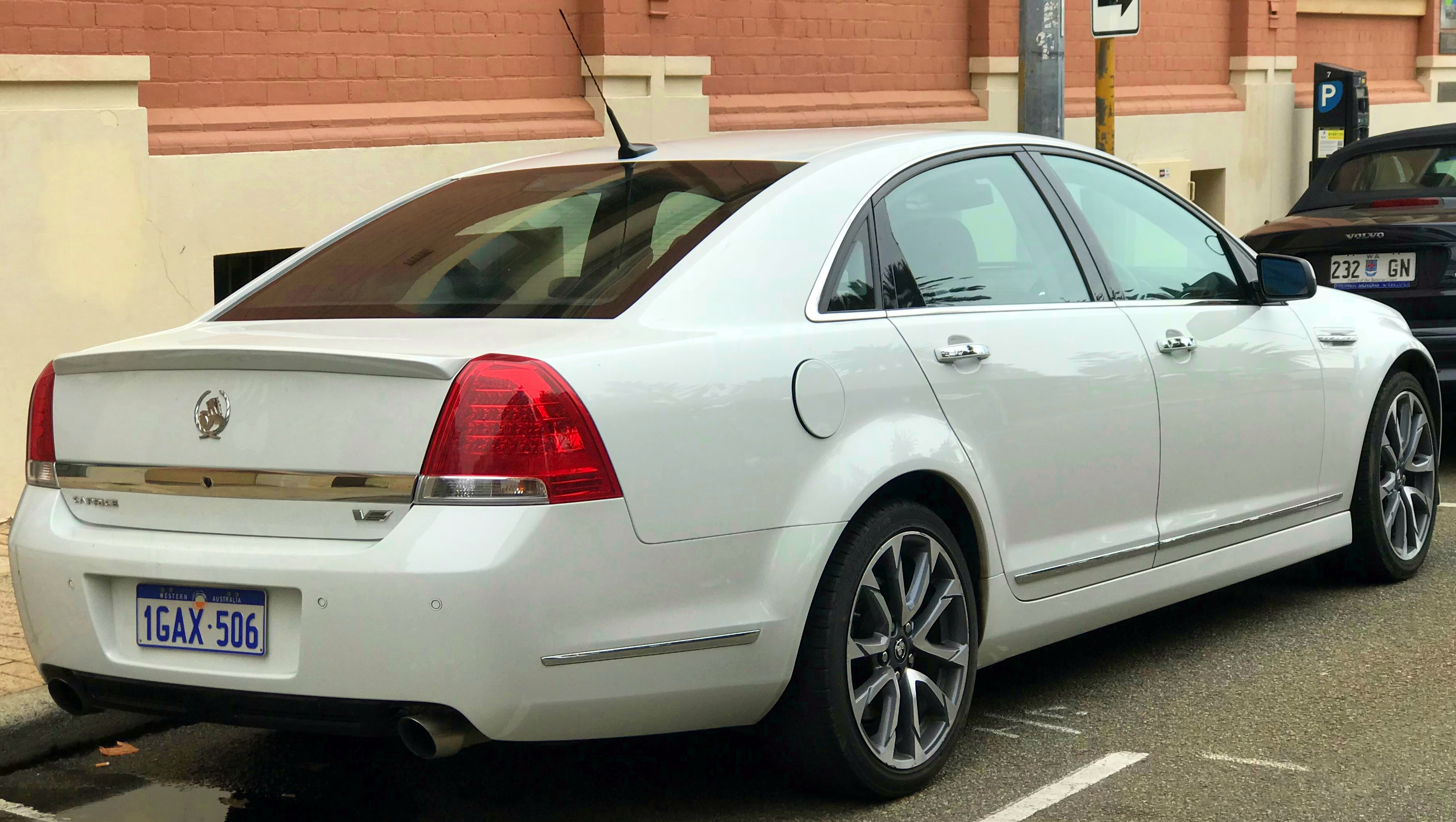
Holden Caprice (WN II)

In 2013, Holden released the WN series, based on the final Australian-made VF Commodore series. It consisted of new alloy wheels and upgraded dashboard and electronics, both inherited from short-wheelbase Calais V (VF). It was also the most advanced, safest Caprice model produced, fitted with an eight-inch touch screen in the centre console, keyless entry and auto-park assist standard. Other features include a heads-up display on the windscreen, forward and rear collision warning systems, blind spot monitors and a lane departure warning system.

There are two engine options, the V6 LPG engine or the 6.0-litre L77 V8 engine rated at 260 kW (349 hp) coupled with the six-speed 6L80E automatic transmission. Both drivetrains are inherited from their Commodore equivalents. Since the WN Series II in 2015, the Caprice received an upgrade to the 6.2-litre LS3 V8 engine producing 304 kW (408 hp), like the donor Commodore model. No BiModal exhaust option with LS3 engine.

== Export models ==
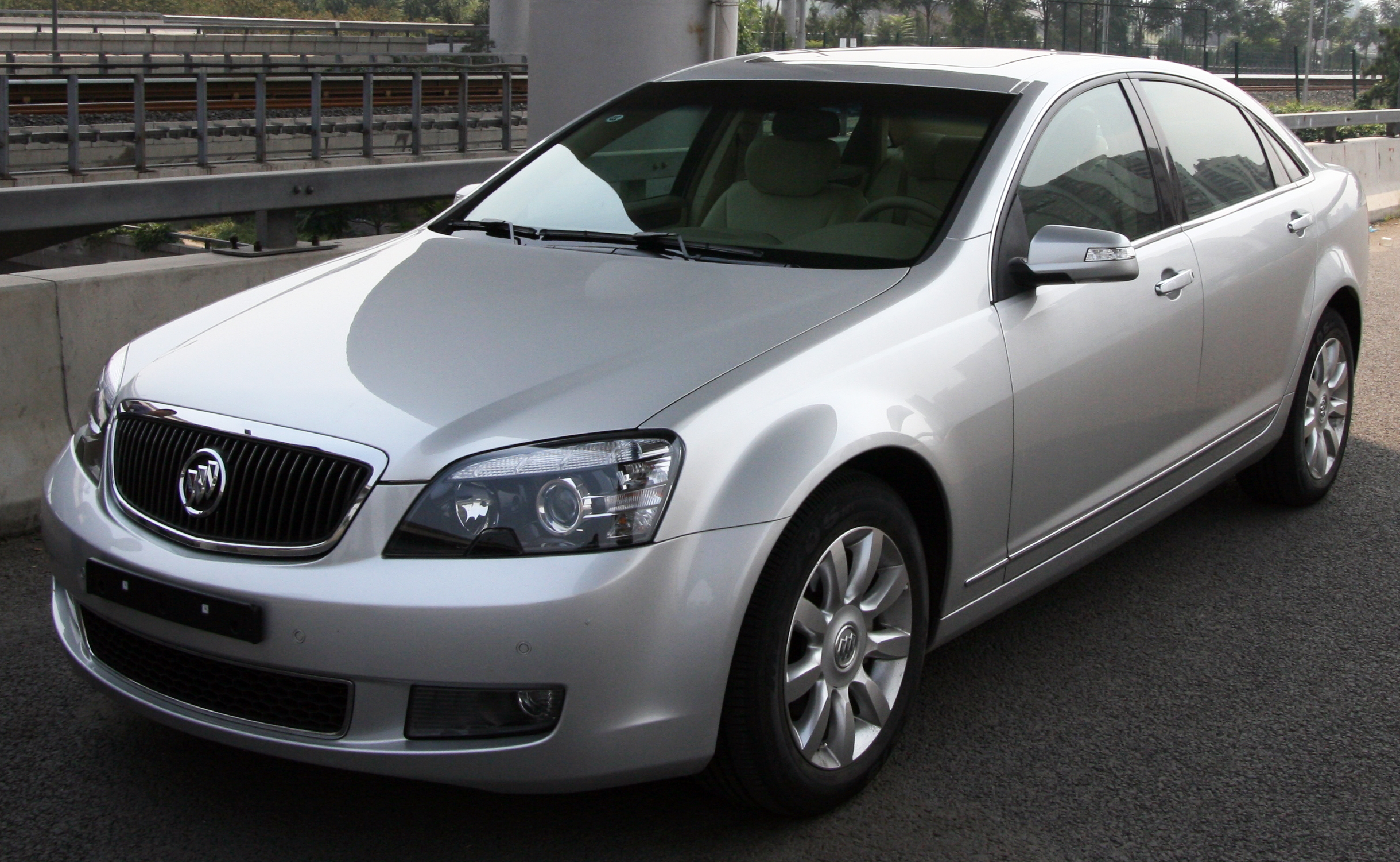
Buick Park Avenue (WM)

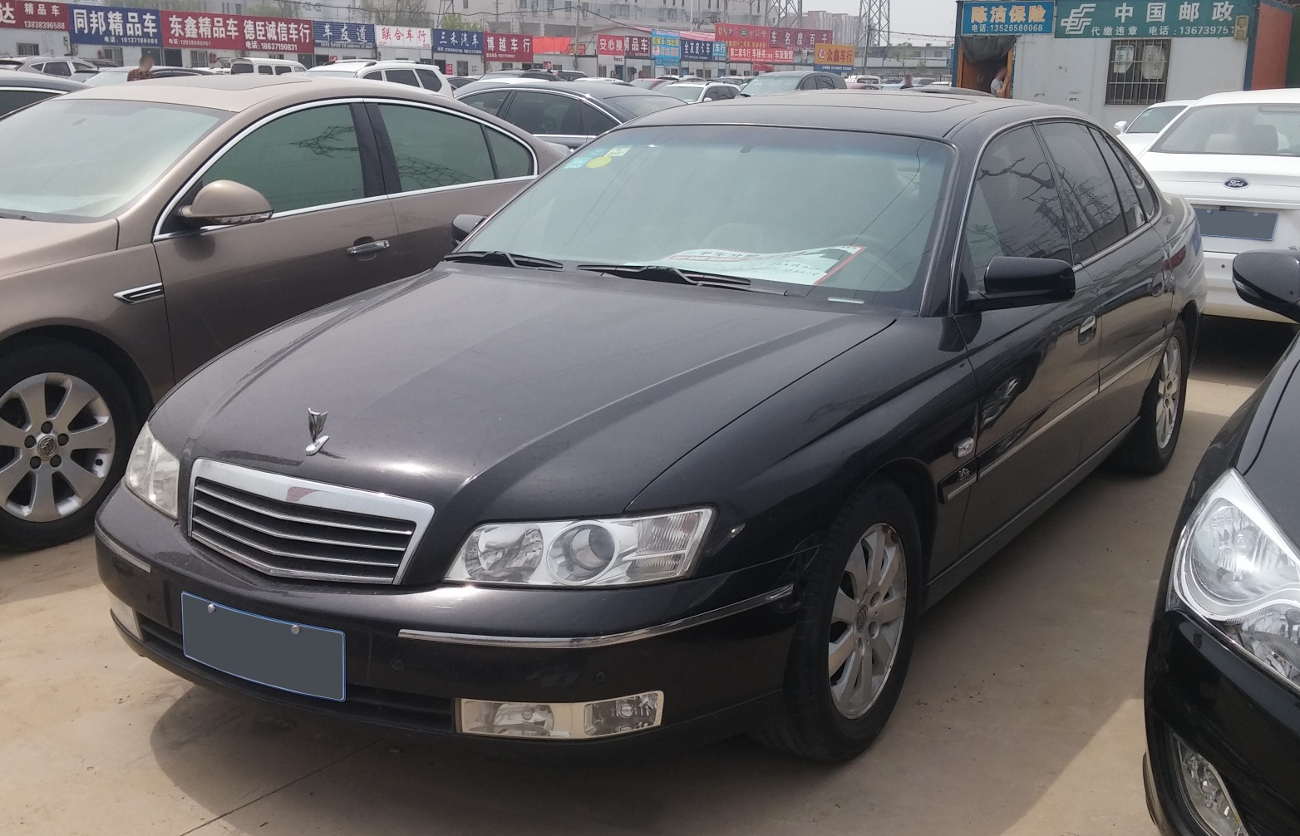
Buick Royaum (WL)

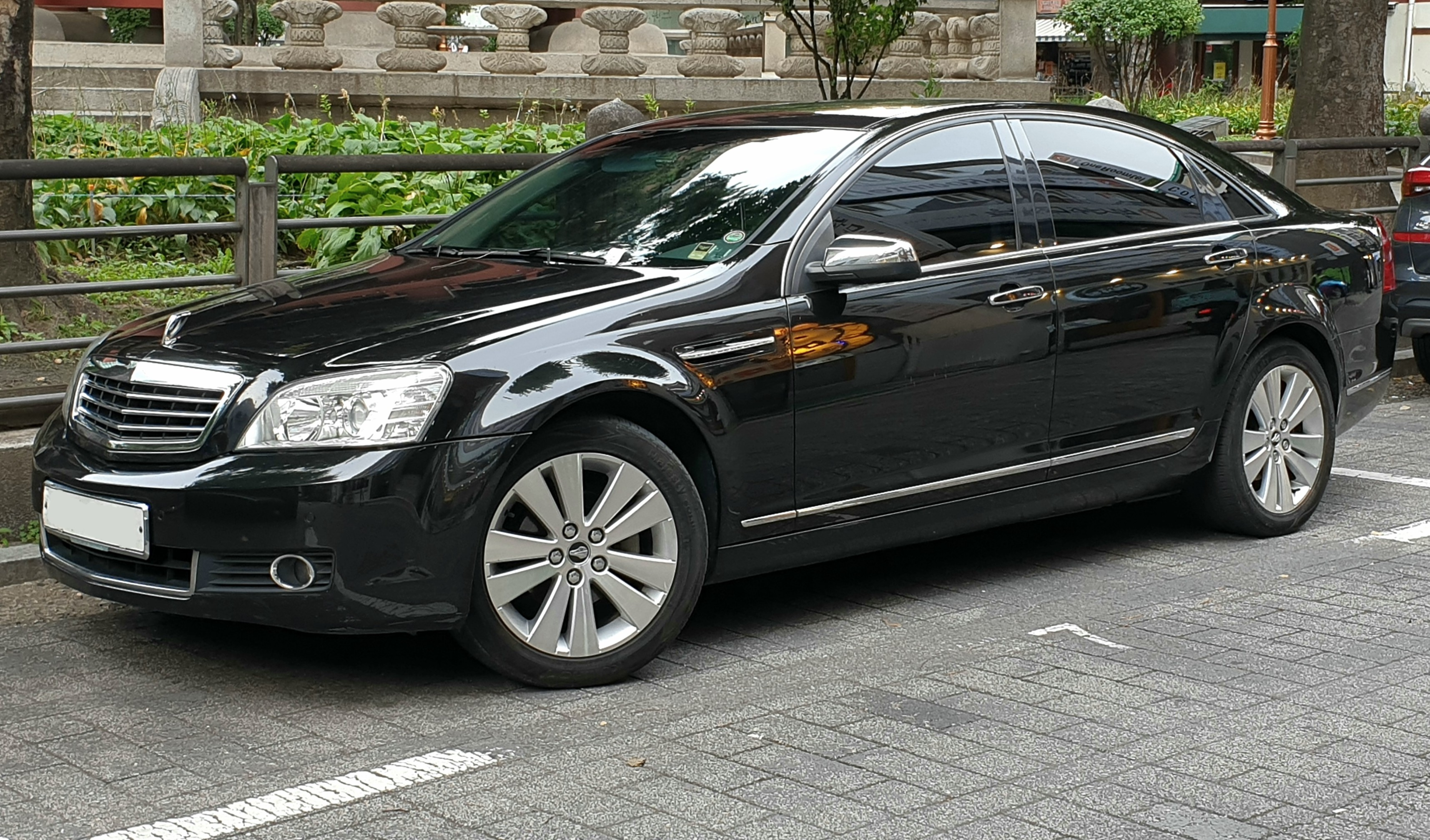
Daewoo Veritas (WM)

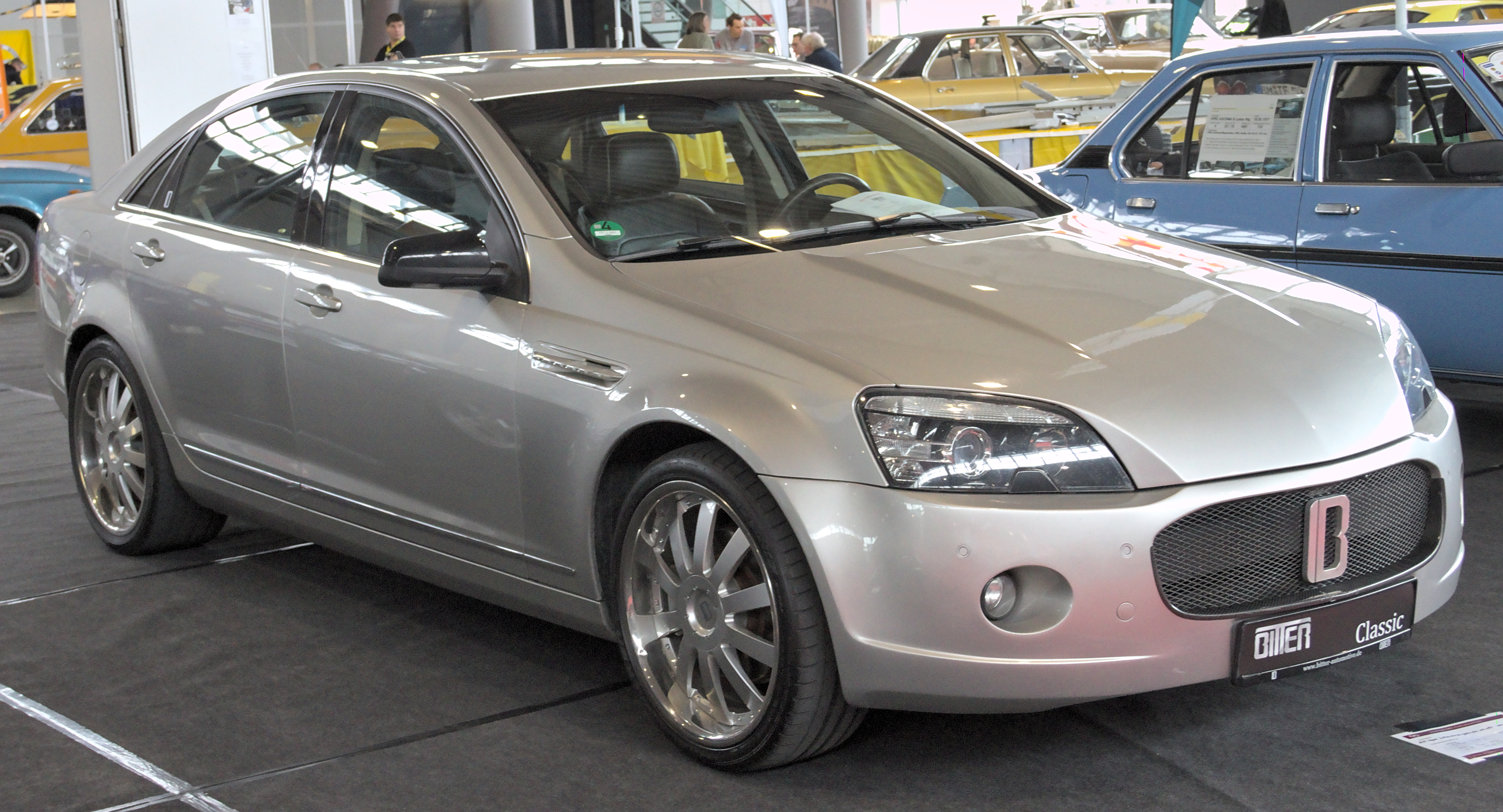
Bitter Vero (WM)

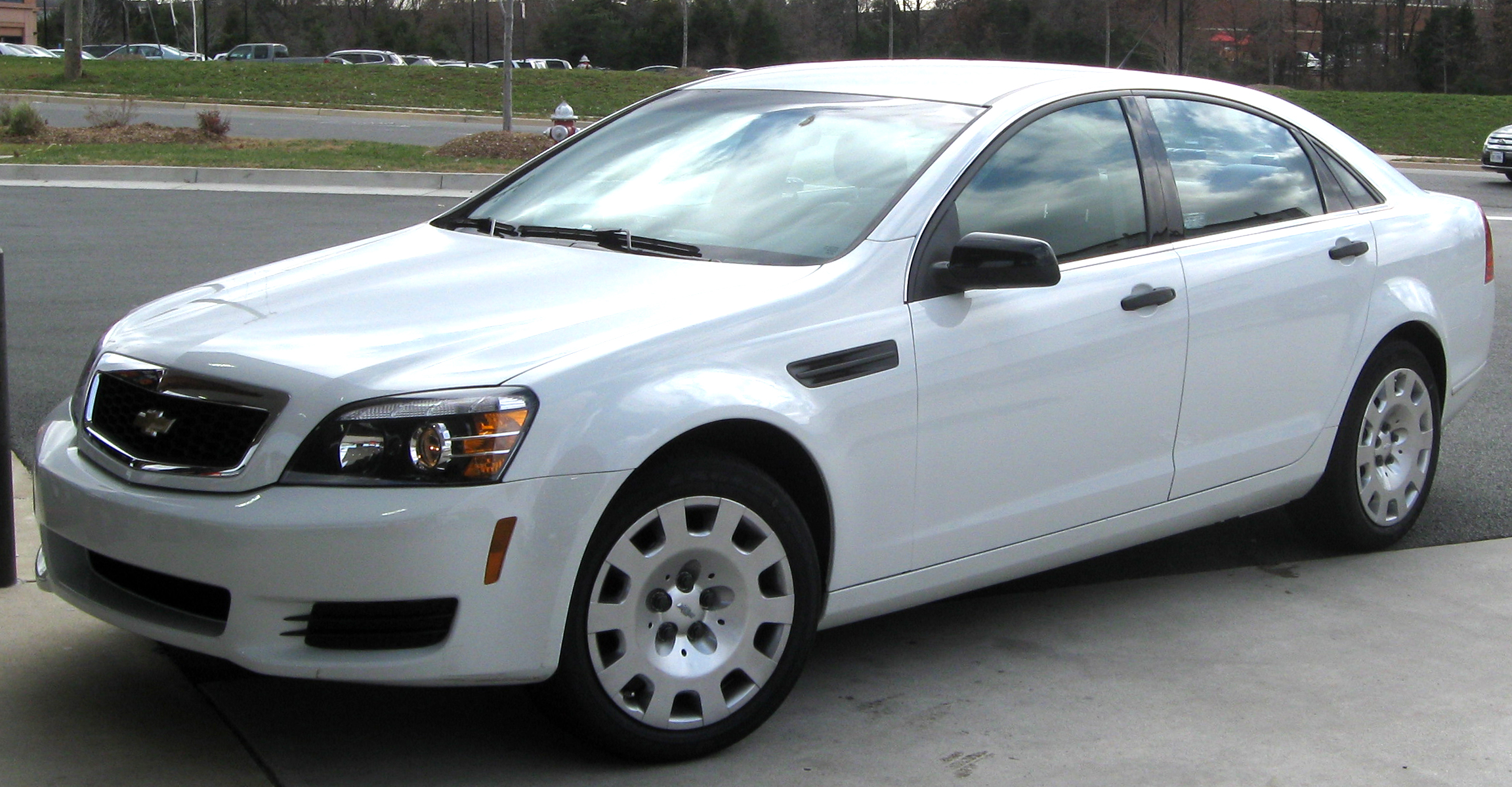
Chevrolet Caprice PPV (WM)

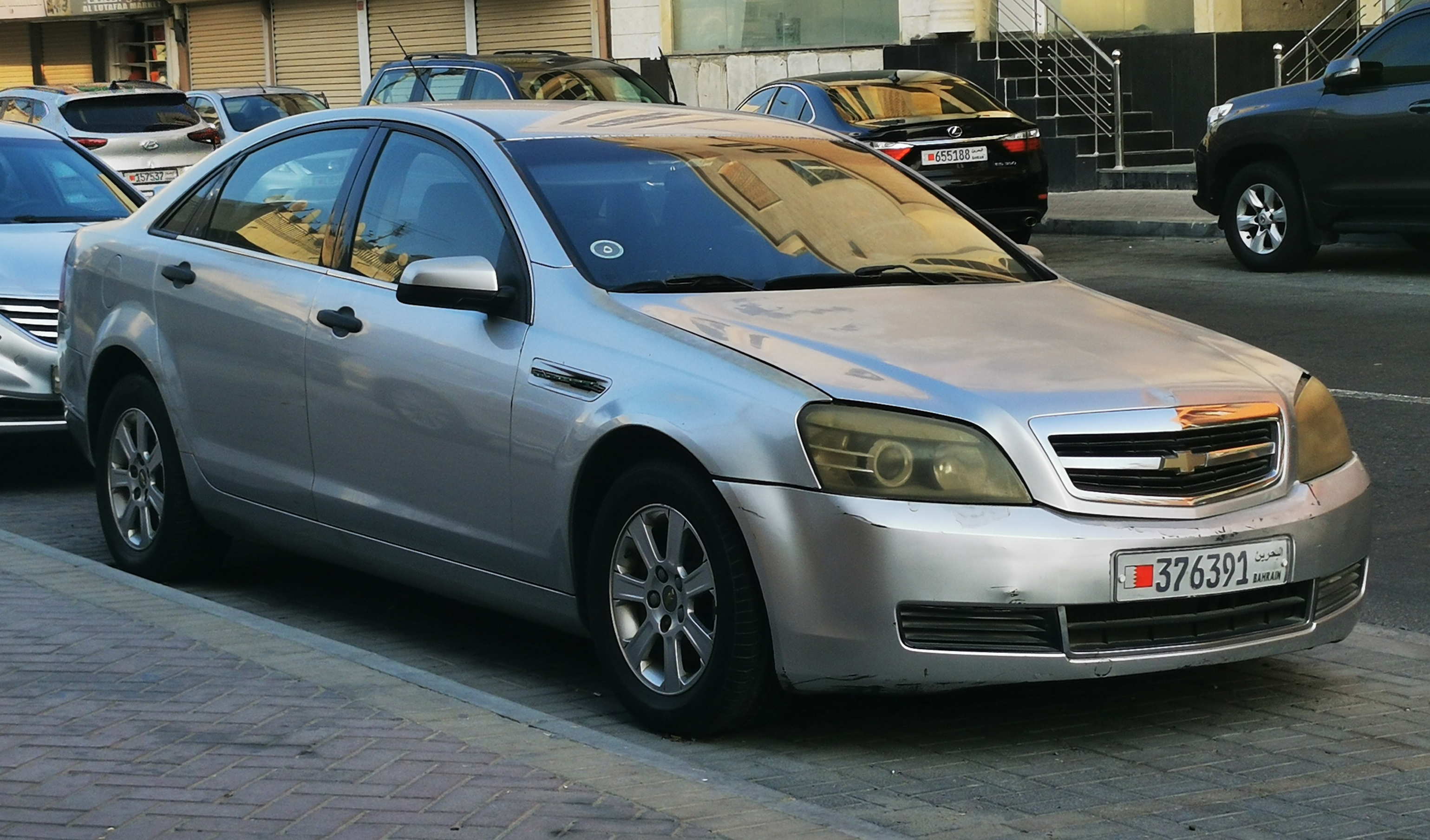
Chevrolet Caprice (WM)

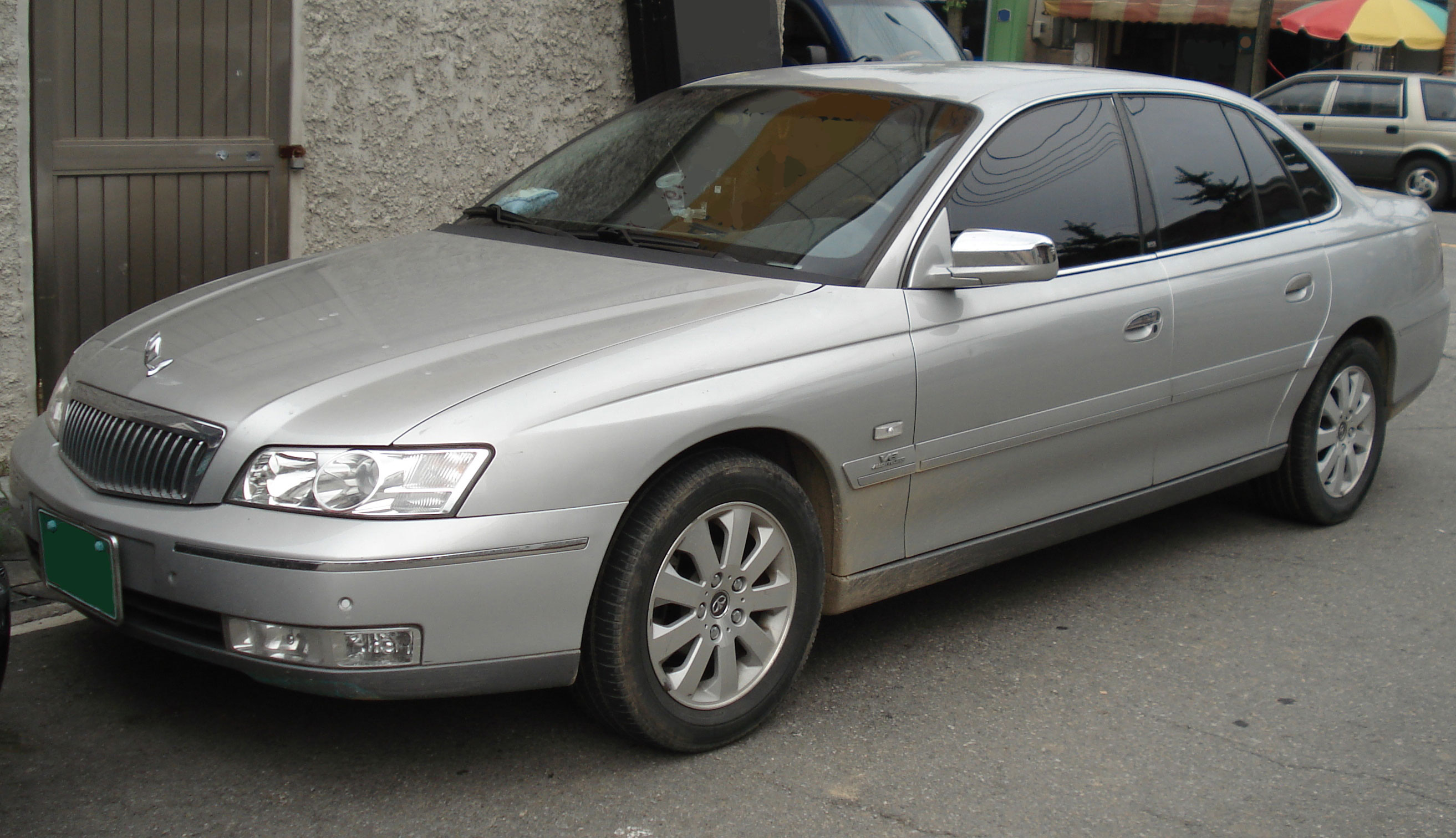
Daewoo Statesman (WL)

== HSV Grange ==
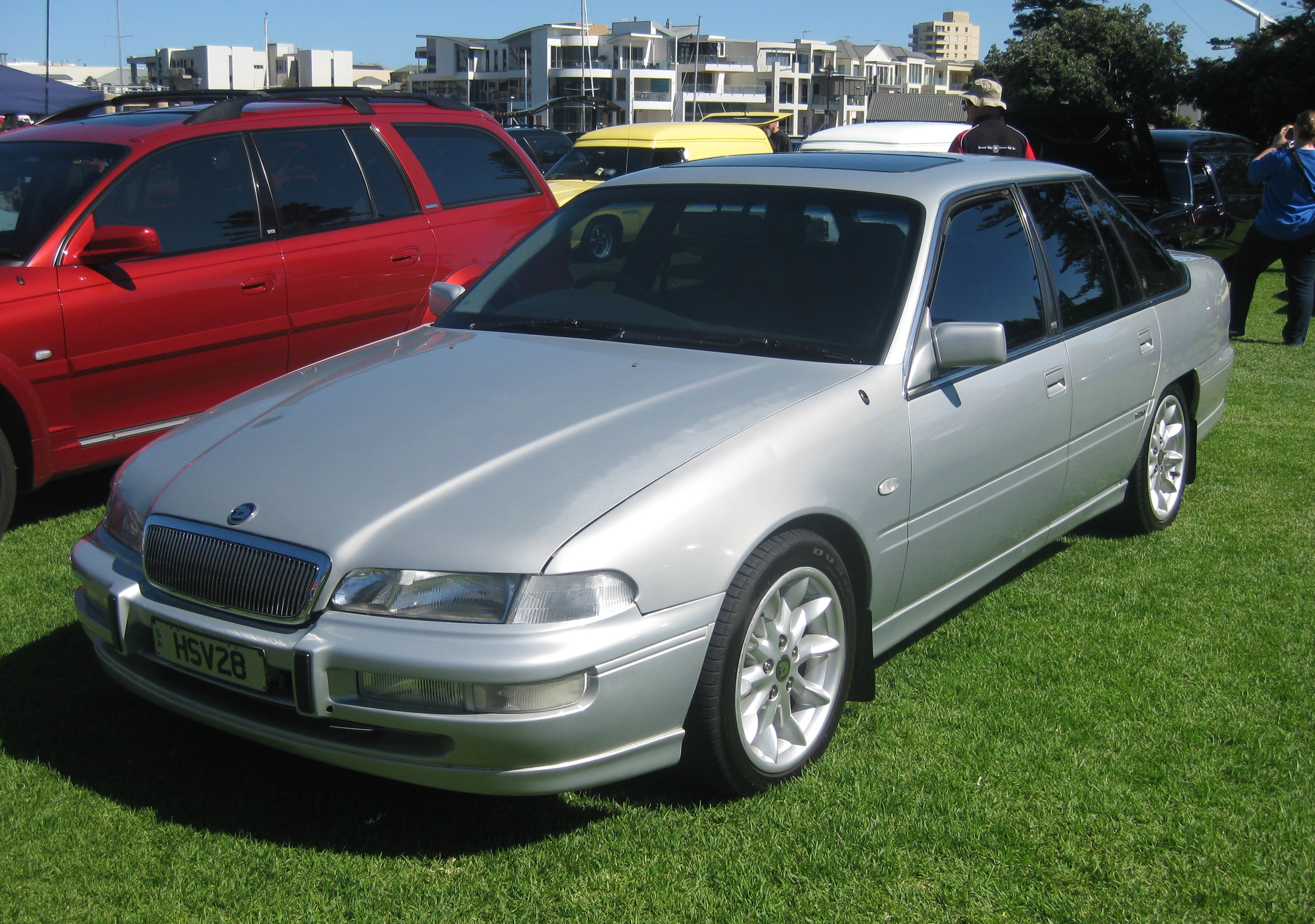
HSV Grange (VS)

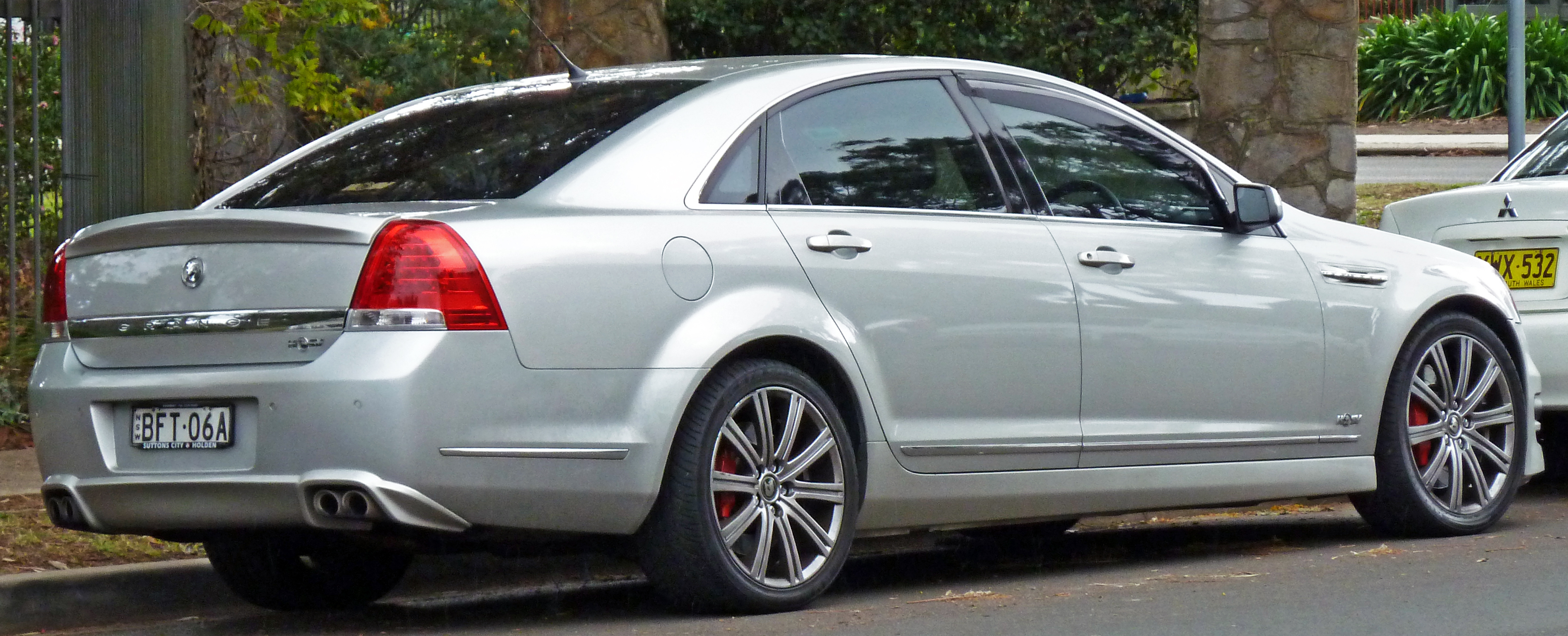
HSV Grange (E Series)

From the arrival of the VS series, Holden Special Vehicles (HSV) modified the Statesman, equipping it with higher performance V8s and sold as the HSV Grange, replacing the previous HSV Statesman 5000i, SV90 and SV93 from the VQ series. Starting from WM and WN series, the Grange has been based on the Caprice, due to the demise of the Statesman. The last series (WN) of HSV Grange was equipped with the 340 kW (456 hp) version of the 6.2-litre LS3 V8 engine.

== Sales ==
Sales in Australia
Variant	1990	1991	1992	1993	1994	1995	1996	1997	1998	1999
Statesman		1,836	2,125	1,350	3,991	4,461	4,409	3,857	3,806	4,222
Caprice		309	367	193	879	740	607	530	534	687
Variant	2000	2001	2002	2003	2004	2005	2006	2007	2008	2009
Statesman	5,566	4,971	4,347	4,363	3,640	2,832	1,986	2,143	1,804	584
Caprice	804	547	611	1,061	30,000	741	1,090	2,611	1,641	1,455
Variant	2010	2011	2012	2013	2014	2015	2016	2017		
Statesman	284	2								
Caprice	1,715	1,892	1,460	1,113	1,218	1,324	954	551		
